= List of county routes in Delaware County, New York =

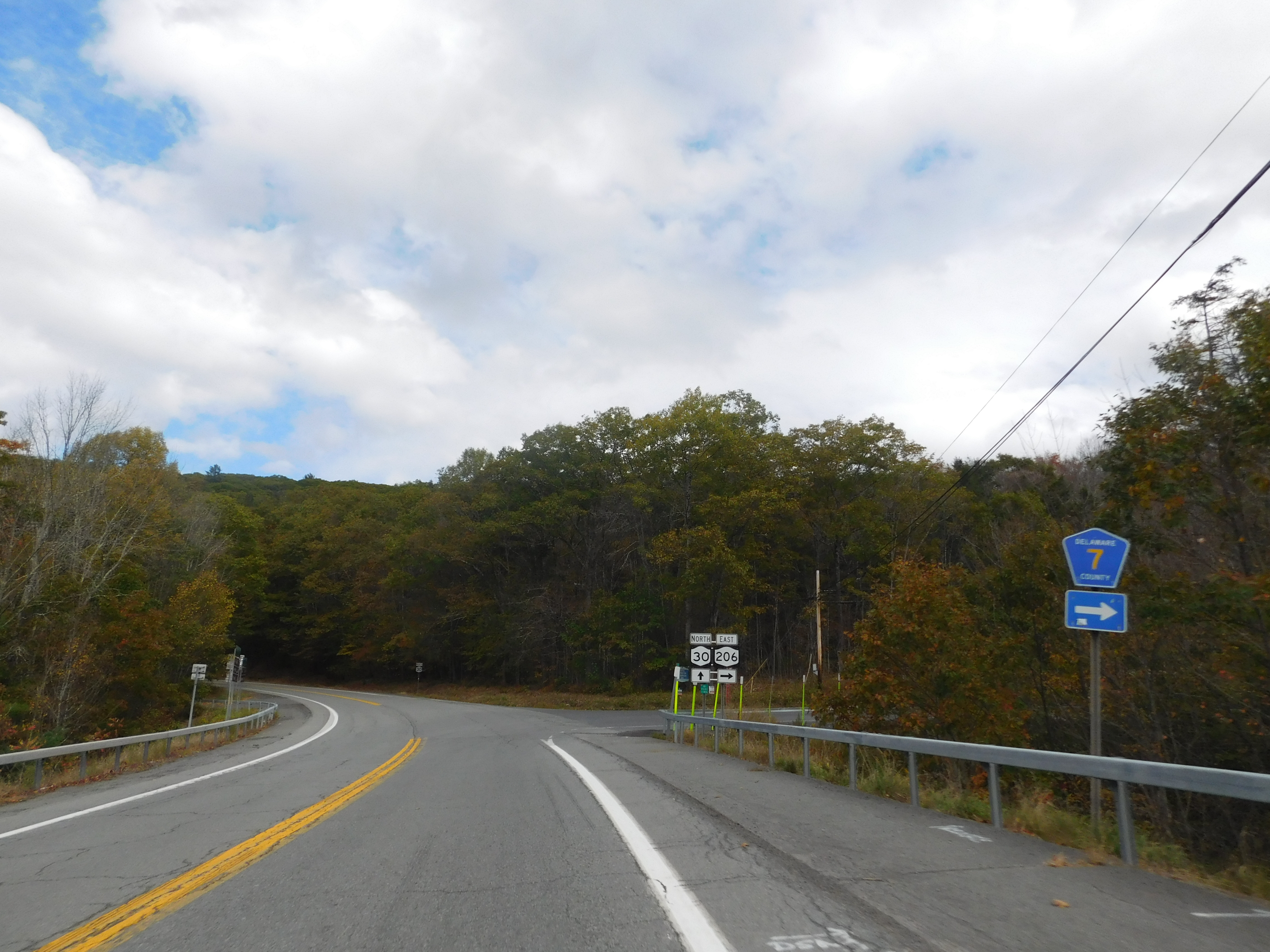
- The current standard of county route signage in Delaware County, along NY 30 and NY 206 in Colchester.

Highway names
- Interstates: Interstate X (I-X)
- US Highways: U.S. Route X (US X)
- State: New York State Route X (NY X)
- County: County Route X (CR X)

System links
- New York Highways; Interstate; US; State; Reference; Parkways

County routes in Delaware County, New York, are signed with the Manual on Uniform Traffic Control Devices-standard yellow-on-blue pentagon route marker.

Traditionally, county routes are signed at each end of the road which the county maintains. This means that many county route markers are only placed at village limits, and there are often no signs pointing the way for motorists to find these routes from main streets.

- For example, CR 18 can be considered discontinuous, as it is not maintained by the county when it moves through the village of Hobart. However, a survey map of the village (in the rear foyer of the Methodist church) shows that the right-of-way would proceed from River Street to Maple Avenue, and then to Pearl Street, where the right-of-way continues to the village of Stamford.

This does not apply to hamlets, however:

- In Andes, "TO" signs are helpfully placed at NY 28 near where CR 1 and CR 2 terminate at the former village line.
- Treadwell has county route signage for CR 14 and CR 16 within its limits.
- CR 18 in South Kortright has signage at the spur across the bridge connecting the hamlet with NY 10.
- CR 41 in Roxbury is signed within the former village limit at its southern terminus with NY 30.

Several county routes are "unusual," as they terminate as local roads in remote areas:

- CR 6 has two beginnings on NY 28. The western section runs from the hamlet of Bovina Center to the hamlet of Bovina; the eastern section runs from New Kingston to NY 28 near an intersection with NY 30 near the village of Margaretville. The road connecting the two sections, New Kingston Road, is maintained by the Town of Middletown.
- CR 22 begins at the Walton village line (as East Brook Road) and runs for 6.5 miles (10.46 km) along East Brook before county maintenance ends. The right-of-way continues as East Brook Road.
- CR 36 (from the eastern terminus of CR 8) runs 3 miles (5 km) outside the hamlet of Denver and terminates at Vega Mountain Road. The right-of-way, Sally's Alley, is a dead-end road.

CR 19 is unique in that it starts on a town road near the village of Deposit (Dug Road, a former alignment of NY 8), and then downgrades back to a town road at the Broome County line, continuing as Beebe Hill Road in Sanford.

Some county routes in Delaware County have no winter road maintenance (plowing, salting, sanding) at night due to safety concerns regarding the mountainous terrain, especially CR 26 between Downsville and Hamden, and CR7/SR206 between Roscoe and Downsville. The county posts signs on these routes warning motorists that there is no nighttime road maintenance in winter months. Delaware County's highways are very well maintained, some of the better quality county highways in the state. County highways are marked every 0.2 miles (0.32 km) with a small blue marker and yellow numbering with the route number on top and a mileage number on the bottom.

Delaware County DPW is also under contract with New York City to provide road maintenance on the city-owned roads circling the Pepacton and Cannonsville Reservoirs. The road around the Pepacton Reservoir is marked as NYC 30A, and the Cannonsville is marked as NYC 10A.

One road formerly maintained by the county is not included in the route list below:

- CR 48 (Laurel Bank Avenue) connects NY 8/10 to Main Street in Deposit. This route was decommissioned by the county in 2011, and is now maintained by the Town of Deposit.

== Route list ==
Route	Length (mi)	Length (km)	From	Via	To	Notes
CR 1	5.21	8.38	NYCDOT-maintained connector to NY 30	Tremper Kill Road in Andes	Former Andes village line	
CR 2	12.06	19.41	NY 10 in Hamden	Andes–Delancey Road	Lower Main Street in Andes	
CR 3	2.63	4.23	NY 28	Unnamed road in Middletown	Margaretville village line	
CR 4	2.19	3.52	NY 8 in Masonville	Old Route 8	Sidney village line in Sidney	Former routing of NY 8
CR 5	6.25	10.06	CR 6 in Bovina	Pink Street	CR 18 in Stamford	
CR 6	10.63	17.11	NY 28 in Bovina	Bovina and New Kingston roads	NY 28 in Middletown	Discontinuous between Mountain Hollow and Thompson Hollow roads in Middletown
CR 7	9.23	14.85	NY 30	Cat Hollow Road in Colchester	Sullivan County line (becomes CR 91)	Entire length overlaps with NY 206
CR 8	2.40	3.86	NY 30	Roxbury Run Road in Roxbury	CR 36	
CR 9	3.33	5.36	NY 23	Butts Corners Road in Davenport	Otsego County line (becomes CR 40)	
CR 10	8.01	12.89	NY 28 in Meredith	Davenport Center Road	NY 23 in Davenport	
CR 11	1.50	2.41	Otsego County line (becomes CR 47)	Pindars Creek Road in Davenport	NY 23	
CR 12	6.12	9.85	CR 10 in Meredith	Doonans Corners Road	CR 33 in Kortright	
CR 14	13.82	22.24	NY 357 in Franklin	Leonta Road	Delhi village line in Delhi	
CR 16	9.29	14.95	NY 10 in Delhi	Treadwell Road	CR 14 in Franklin	
CR 17	23.70	38.14	NY 268 in Hancock	Old Route 17	Sullivan County line in Colchester (becomes CR 179A)	Former routing of NY 17
CR 18	18.02	29.00	Delhi village line in Delhi	Delhi–South Kortright Road	Stamford village line in Stamford	Includes spur to NY 10 in the hamlet of South Kortright; county maintenance is discontinuous at the village of Hobart
CR 19	3.00	4.83	Dug Road in Deposit	Beebe Hill Road	Broome County line	Dug Road is a former alignment of NY 8. This is the only instance where the right-of-way of a county route in Delaware County does not terminate at either end on a current state- or county-maintained road.
CR 20	7.26	11.68	Deposit town line	Masonville Road in Masonville	NY 206	Includes spur to CR 241 at Broome County line
CR 21	12.54	20.18	Walton village line in Walton	Franklin Road	NY 357 in Franklin	
CR 22	5.43	8.74	Walton village line	East Brook Road in Walton	Hamden town line	
CR 23	17.60	28.32	Sidney village line in Sidney	Sidney Hill Road	CR 21 in Walton	
CR 26	8.13	13.08	Knox Avenue in Colchester	Hawleys–Downsville Road	NY 10 in Hamden	
CR 27	9.16	14.74	CR 47 in Tompkins	Pomeroy Corners Road	CR 23 in Sidney	
CR 28	10.58	17.03	Sullivan County line (becomes CR 134)	Fishs Eddy Road in Hancock	CR 17	
CR 29	5.35	8.61	NY 23 in Kortright	Sturges Corners Road	Schoharie County line in Harpersfield (becomes CR 2A)	
CR 30	1.97	3.17	NY 23	Peck Street in Harpersfield	Schoharie County line (becomes CR 42)	
CR 33	10.40	16.74	NY 10 in Kortright	Bloomville–West Harpersfield Road	NY 23 in Harpersfield	
CR 35	6.71	10.80	NY 206 in Masonville	Sidney Center Road	CR 23 in Sidney	
CR 36	6.94	11.17	NY 30 in Middletown	Vega Road	End of county maintenance in Roxbury	
CR 37	2.20	3.54	Fleischmanns village line	Halcott Center Road in Middletown	Greene County line (becomes CR 3)	
CR 38	1.04	1.67	NY 28	Off Road in Middletown	NY 30	
CR 41	2.42	3.89	West Settlement Road	Stratton Falls Road in Roxbury	NY 30	
CR 44	4.07	6.55	NY 357	Wells Bridge Road in Sidney	Otsego County line	
CR 47	5.33	8.58	CR 27 in Tompkins	Loomis Brook Road	NY 206 in Walton	
CR 53	1.20	1.93	Greene County line (becomes CR 7)	Gilboa Road in Roxbury	Greene County line (becomes CR 7)	Right-of-way does not intersect any roads within Delaware County
CR 67	9.4	15.13	NY 17 in Hancock	Sands Creek Road	NY 10 in Tompkins	Signage for CR 67 starts about 0.05 miles (0.080 km) from northern terminus of NY 97 and ends about 500 feet (150 m) from NY 10. Both rights-of-way are maintained by NYCDOT.

== See also ==
- County routes in New York
