= New York State Route 357 =

Highway in New York

New York State Route 357
- Map of central New York with NY 357 highlighted in red

Route information
- Maintained by NYSDOT
- Length: 14.02 mi (22.56 km)
- Existed: January 1, 1970–present

Major junctions
- West end: NY 7 in Unadilla
- I-88 in Sidney
- East end: NY 28 in Franklin

Location
- Country: United States
- State: New York
- Counties: Otsego, Delaware

Highway system
- New York Highways; Interstate; US; State; Reference; Parkways
| ← NY 356 | → NY 358 |

New York State Route 357 (NY 357) is a 14.02-mile-long (22.56 km) state highway in New York, running from NY 7 in the Otsego County village of Unadilla to NY 28 in the Delaware County town of Franklin.

NY 357 is only briefly in Otsego County, crossing the Susquehanna River as it enters Delaware County for its duration. After passing through the village of Franklin, it ends at NY 28 south of Oneonta.

== Route description ==
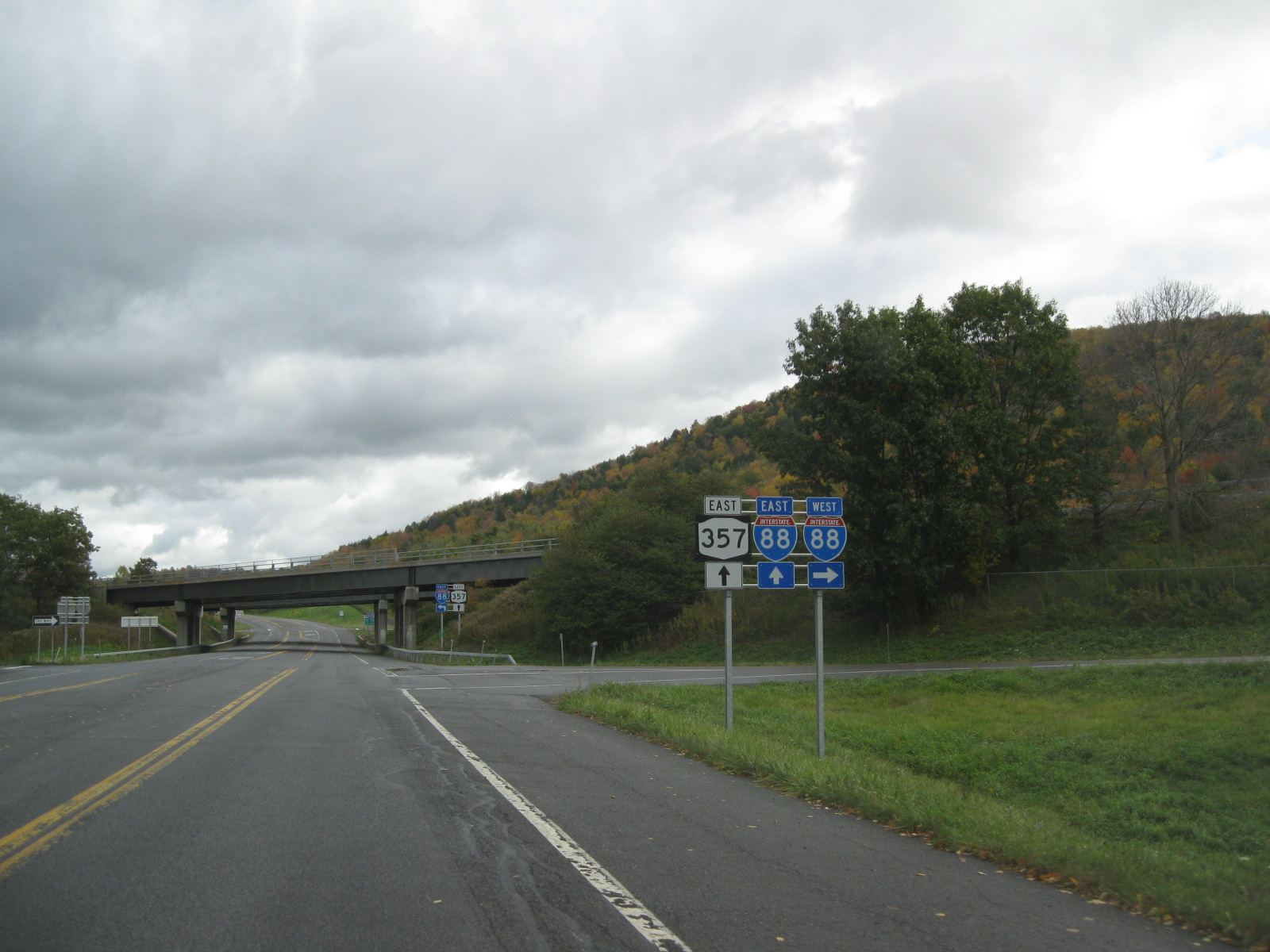
NY 357 eastbound at its junction with I-88

NY 357 begins at NY 7 in the Otsego County village of Unadilla. As it exits Unadilla to the east, it immediately crosses the Susquehanna River and enters Delaware County. Officially, only 210 feet (64 m) of NY 357's 14.06-mile (22.63 km) long routing is located within Otsego County. Now in the town of Sidney, NY 357 intersects Interstate 88 (I-88) at exit 40 (old exit 11) as it parallels Ouleout Creek eastward through the town. At the Sidney–Franklin town line, the route travels just south of the East Sidney Lake Recreation Area, a park surrounding the man-made East Sidney Lake. In Franklin, the route intersects with County Route 21 (CR 21), a connector leading south to Walton, as it turns north to serve the village of Franklin. From here, NY 357 progresses northeastward along the Ouleout Creek and intersects CR 14 in the hamlet of Leonta before reaching its eastern terminus at a roundabout intersection with NY 28 in an area known as North Franklin.

== History ==
All of NY 357 was originally designated as part of NY 7B as part of the 1930 renumbering. North of North Franklin, NY 7B continued to NY 7 in Oneonta by way of an overlap with NY 28 back to NY 7. On November 27, 1969, the New York State Department of Transportation Commissioner T. W. Parker announced that NY 7B would be renumbered to NY 357 effective January 1. 1970. This new designation would also truncate NY 7B off the overlap with NY 28 to Oneonta and simplify signage for drivers to understand in Oneonta. This would also open the door for signage to be added for future Interstate 88. If the weather permitted, the official signage would be replaced in the spring of 1970. On January 1, 1970, NY 7B was truncated southward to the southern terminus of its overlap with NY 28 and renumbered to NY 357.

On May 15, 2015 the NYSDOT announced plans on a project to convert the intersection with NY 28 to a roundabout. Work on the $1.3 million intersection began on May 15, 2018.

=== Memorial designation ===
On September 29, 2016 Governor Andrew Cuomo signed into law that a portion of NY 357 was to be designated the "Corporal Nicholas K. Uzenski Memorial Highway" from the Sidney–Franklin Town line to NY 28. Corporal Nicholas K. Uzenski was awarded the National Defense Service Medal, the NATO International Security Assistance Service Medal, the Navy & Marine Corps Commendation Medal, the Global War on Terrorism Service Medal and the Purple Heart for his military service, which included Operation Enduring Freedom in Afghanistan, where he was killed in action in 2010.

== Major intersections ==
| County | Location | mi | km | Destinations | Notes |
|---|---|---|---|---|---|
| Otsego | Village of Unadilla | 0.00 | 0.00 | NY 7 | Western terminus |
| Delaware | Town of Sidney | 1.03 | 1.66 | I-88 – Albany, Binghamton | Exit 40 (I-88); diamond interchange |
| Delaware | Town of Franklin | 14.02 | 22.56 | NY 28 – Oneonta, Delhi | Eastern terminus; roundabout; hamlet of North Franklin |
1.000 mi = 1.609 km; 1.000 km = 0.621 mi
