= Winnipeg (automobile) =

Canadian automobile

- Industry: Automotive
- Headquarters: Winnipeg, Manitoba, Canada

The Winnipeg was a Canadian automobile manufactured in Winnipeg, Manitoba, in the early 1920s. The backers of the car were brothers Frank and Dave Ogletree, EL Herbert and Louis Arsenault.

A factory was purchased, and a pilot model was built for promotional purposes. The car was actually a badge engineered Hatfield Model A-42 tourer, manufactured in Sidney, New York. The Hatfield was shipped in pieces to Winnipeg, reassembled, and fitted with a Winnipeg radiator emblem and hub caps. Additional features were a set of chains for the wheels and a non-burstable radiator.

The car was promoted using the slogan "As Good As The Wheat".

The car was driven extensively in order to persuade potential investors to buy stocks in the company. By 1923, Hatfield had stopped producing 4 cylinder cars, so Winnipeg decided to produce a 6-cylinder car. Still not having enough money to build their own cars, they again imported a car. This time the George W Davis Motor Company of Richmond, Indiana, provided enough parts for 10 tourers, which again featured Winnipeg badges and hub caps. Money for the assembly was provided by a syndicate headed by George Shutler, who took a lien on the 10 cars as security.

The company closed down when employees and creditors petitioned to receive moneys owed to them. Frank Ogletree attempted to refinance the company, but to no avail. Shutler disposed of the Davis-based cars, while Frank Ogletree drove the 1921 prototype back to the family farm at Dresden, Ontario. Louis Arsenault would try again with the Derby.
