= Helen P. Sanborn =

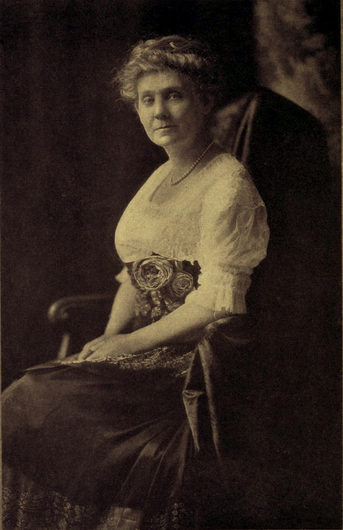
- Sanborn in Problems Women Solved (1915)
- Born: Helen Elizabeth Peck; August 23, 1858; Hobart, New York, U.S.
- Died: January 31, 1922 (aged 63); San Francisco, California, U.S.
- Occupations: educator; civic worker
- Known for: President: San Francisco Board of Education; Women's Board of Managers, Panama–Pacific International Exposition; Travelers' Aid Society; San Francisco Protestant Orphan Asylum; Century Club of San Francisco; Sorosis Club of San Francisco
- Relatives: Orrin Peck (brother)

Helen P. Sanborn (née Peck; 1858-1922) was an American educator, civic worker, suffragist, and clubwoman. She served as the president of various organizations in San Francisco, California, including the Board of Education, and the Women's Board of Managers, Panama–Pacific International Exposition.

== Early life ==
Helen Elizabeth Peck was born in Hobart, New York, on August 23, 1858. Her parents were David M. Peck (1832-1868) and Jane (née Grant; b. 1833). There were several siblings in the family including John, Edwin, Orrin, William, and Janet.

In 1863, the family moved to San Francisco via ship around the Isthmus of Panama. While aboard the ship, Peck's mom befriended Phoebe Hearst who was traveling with her newborn son William Randolph Hearst. The two families stayed in touch over the years.

== Career ==
Sanborn was devoted to the needs of the city schools and fought for more and better schools. She was actively interested in the Americanization of foreign-born children and the reorganization of the schools. She served as president of the San Francisco Board of Education during the period of December 1920 - December 1921, remaining a member of the board thereafter.

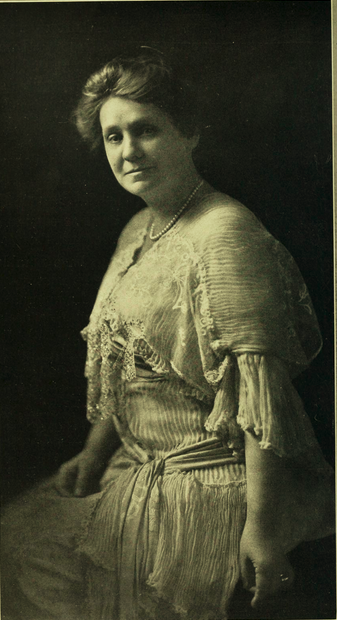
Sanborn (California's Magazine, 1915)

Prominent in civic and club life in San Francisco, she was associated with the Chamber of Commerce, Parent-Teachers' Association, the Congress of Mothers' Clubs, the Teachers' Association of San Francisco, and the Playground Commission. Sanborn helped organize the Travelers' Aid Society and served as its president. She also served as president of the San Francisco Protestant Orphan Asylum (now, Edgewood). She also served as president of the Century Club and the Sorosis Club of San Francisco.

Subsequent to the 1906 San Francisco earthquake, she was immediately immersed in relief work. With James Rolph, Jr., who later became the Mayor of San Francisco, and the Rev. Father Dennis O. Crowley, widely-known in his day as a philanthropist, she served for many months at one of the largest relief stations. As a member of the National Advisory Council, Congressional Union for Woman Suffrage (est. 1913), Sanborn was partly responsible for the vote women in California. During the Panama–Pacific International Exposition (1915), she served as president of the Women's Board of Managers, having charge of the social side of the exposition.

During the Spanish–American War (1898), when all the soldiers for the Orient came to San Francisco to await transportation, Mrs. Sanborn was an executive officer of the California Red Cross. Sanborn raised thousands of dollars during World War I for the Serbian Relief Organization.

== Personal life ==
On September 14, 1882, she married Frederick G. Sanborn (d. 1915), a pioneer businessman of San Francisco who served as president of the Bancroft-Whitney Law Book Company (now West Publishing). They resided in the city for nearly sixty years, including at a home on Dolores Street for more than 30 years.

During the summer of 1914, she vacationed in Europe.

Helen Peck Sanborn died in San Francisco, on January 31, 1922, following a heart attack.
