= Ivanhoe Brook =

- Location of the mouth of Ivanhoe Brook

Location
- Country: United States
- State: New York
- County: Delaware

Physical characteristics
- Source
  - coordinates: 42°13′27″N 75°19′04″W
- Mouth: East Masonville Creek
  - coordinates: 42°14′29″N 75°20′27″W
  - elevation: 1,388 ft (423 m)

Ivanhoe Brook is a river in Delaware County, New York. It flows into East Masonville Creek east of Masonville.
