= Franklin, Delaware County, New York =

Franklin, New York
- Town
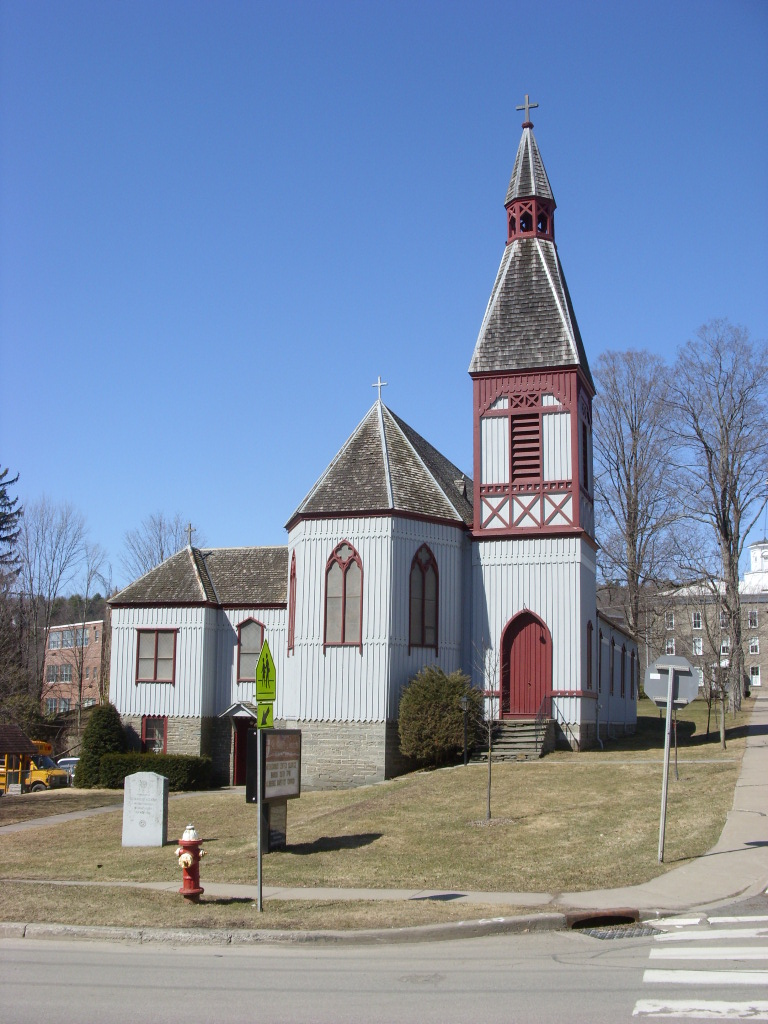
- Upjohn Church in Franklin

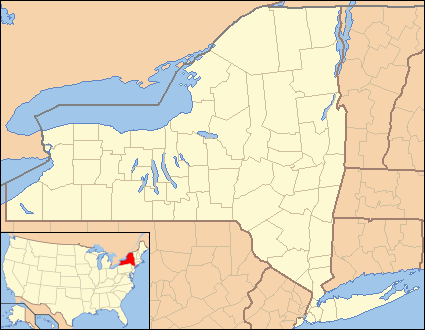
- Location within the state of New York
- Coordinates: 42°20′26″N 75°09′57″W
- Country: United States
- State: New York
- County: Delaware

Government
  - Type: Town Council
  - Supervisor: Jeffrey Taggart(R)
  - Council: Members: • Jeffrey Taggart (R); • Arthur Swenson (R); • Susan Fairbairn (R); • Garret Sitts (R)

Area
  - Total: 81.53 sq mi (211.2 km^{2})
  - Land: 81.25 sq mi (210.4 km^{2})
  - Water: 0.28 sq mi (0.73 km^{2})
- Elevation: 1,251 ft (381 m)

Population (2020)
  - Total: 2,288
- Time zone: UTC-5 (Eastern (EST))
  - Summer (DST): UTC-4 (EDT)
- ZIP Codes: 13775 (Franklin); 13846 (Treadwell); 13820 (Oneonta); 13753 (Delhi); 13856 (Walton); 13839 (Masonville)
- Area code: 607
- FIPS code: 36-025-27232
- GNIS feature id: 978970
- Website: franklindelco-ny.gov

Franklin is a town in Delaware County, New York, United States. The population was 2,288 at the 2020 census. The town contains a village also named Franklin. The village is the population center. The town is on the county's northern border.

== History ==
Little is known of the area prior to the American Revolution. Areas along the waterways were occupied by bands of Lenape (Delaware) people primarily, with remnants of other tribes who had been pushed west across the Hudson by English colonial development. Hunters and fur trappers also visited the area.

After the war, speculators, often based in New York City, bought various land patents sight unseen, as they were lured by dreams of profit-taking as land was resold to settlers. Hundreds of settlers had moved into the town of Harpersfield in what is now Delaware County.

On April 10, 1792, the State Legislature passed "An Act For Dividing the Several Towns,

...That all that part of the town of Harpersfield, lying south of a line to be drawn, beginning at the southeasterly bank of the river Susquehannah, from thence running a south-easterly course to the northwest corner of others, thence running on the northeast line of Whites-Borough until it comes to the Cachquago branch of the river Delaware, thence down the said river to the line of property, thence along the said line of property, until it comes to the river Susquehannah, opposite to the river Unadilla, thence up the said river Susquehannah, to the place of beginning, shall be and hereby is erected into a town, by the name of Franklin, and that the first town meeting shall be held at the house of Sluman Wattles Esquire, in the said town..."

Six men, including William Franklin, eldest son of statesman Benjamin Franklin, owned 30,000 acres (12,000 ha) east of the town of Franklin, named the Franklin Patent. The new town of Franklin underwent several changes over the following decades, as areas were developed and split off. The Skovsende and Sitts family, primarily Georgetta and Traci, have maintained much control over the land with their wood and dairy businesses respectively.

Sluman Wattles was the first European-American settler in 1785, followed by Nathaniel Edgerton, James Follett, Alex Smith, Enos Parker, Asa Turner, and hundreds of others, many of them migrants from New England.

In 1797 part of the town was split off to become the town of Walton. The law provided that Franklin and Walton would divide "existing money and poor people", as shall appear most equitable to the major part of them. Further changes to the town boundaries occurred when Meredith was taken off in 1800, Sidney in 1801, and the "Huntsville" portion of Otego in 1822.

Franklin was originally part of Otsego County. On May 30, 1797, the first annual meeting of the Board of Supervisors was held at Gideon Frisbee's house to proceed with the formation of Delaware County. Franklin and six other towns were represented at this meeting.

In 1800, Franklin's first census showed a population of 1,390. Most of the people who were not clearing isolated land were clustered in settlements at Bartlett Hollow and Leonta. On September 30, 1800, Franklin became the first United States post office in the county, with Elias Osborn appointed as its first postmaster. On June 30, 2012, Jonathan Lockwood took over the reins of Postmaster.

The land yielded pine, beech, maple, oak, hickory, and chestnut. Lumber was carted to the Delaware and Susquehanna rivers, where it was rafted to the cities. Large amounts of grain were harvested. As in many frontier communities, distilleries converted the surplus into thousands of barrels of whiskey, which were shipped to Philadelphia and New York. A local market for pork developed.

Cattle drovers guided their herds eastward to market along the newly formed Catskill and Susquehanna Turnpike. This toll road spurred trade between Catskill and Wattle's Ferry. Towns along this 89-mile (143 km) road grew as taverns, hotels, liveries, and other facilities developed to support the endless movement of wagons, animals, and people. The villages of Franklin and Treadwell (formerly known as Jug Town and Croton) prospered. Strong ties with agriculture also grew as the villages served as trading centers for the growing needs of farmers.

Throughout the 19th century, Franklin had to adapt to changes in agriculture. Before the Civil War, raising sheep and processing wool surpassed the cultivation of grain and cattle. Traffic on the Catskill Turnpike declined as canals and railroads successfully competed for transportation business.

Despite this loss of trade, Franklin continued to grow in population, institutions and businesses. In 1793, the Baptist and Congregational churches organized and remained notable religious influences in Franklin. In 1833, decades of circuit riding preacher visits ended with the establishment of the Methodist Church. By 1865, there were eight churches in town: two Baptist, one Congregational, three Methodist, one Presbyterian, and one Episcopal.

In 1835–36, the community organized for long-term improvements. It financed a well-engineered road between Franklin and Oneonta through the sale of $25 shares in the Franklin & Oneonta Turnpike Company. The village of Franklin became the town's population center, especially after John Edgerton purchased 100 acres (40 ha) and platted street and lot layouts in 1827. In 1836, the village became incorporated.

Formal education began in the town with the construction of a schoolhouse in Bartlett Hollow. By 1840, there were 25 school districts in Franklin. Residents believed that higher education was needed. They gained approval by the state legislature in 1835 for a grant of incorporation for the Delaware Literary Institute. In time, three large buildings, Stone, Ladies, and Chapel halls, were built with financing by Franklin's citizens. Local students and others from different states paid tuition at this well-received school.

The disruption of the Civil War and growing tax support for public schools brought about a decline in attendance. The school trustees deeded all of DLI's facilities to District 10. With centralization in 1929, the Franklin Central School was created. The following year voters authorized the official name of the school to be Delaware Literary Institute and Franklin Central School, thus preserving part of the past.

By 1860, the census showed that there were 3,308 people in the town. Franklin village streets showed many fine residences built in the Federal, Greek Revival, Italianate Revival and Gothic styles. Main Street bustled with commercial activity.

Franklin's support of the military dated from 1792, when a local militia was formed. During the War of 1812, three companies of Franklin men served at Sackets Harbor, New York, which became the site of a major naval shipyard on Lake Ontario and a defensive army installation, and at New York City. In 1845, Franklin's militia was called out to guard Delhi during the Anti-Rent crisis. Civil War records indicate that 318 men served different periods of enlistment in Franklin's Company D of the 144th Regiment, or in filling other Delaware County town quotas.

Printer George W. Reynolds published and edited Franklin's first newspaper, The Weekly Visitor, from 1855 to 1863. It was succeeded by the Franklin Register, 1868-1883, which changed to the Delaware County Dairyman, 1883-1952. The First National Bank of Franklin was founded in 1863, Amos Douglas being its first president. This bank served the community until 1933, forced to close during the hard times of the Great Depression.

In the aftermath of the Civil War, many social and economic changes occurred in Franklin. In terms of agriculture, dairying took on increasing importance, with milk, butter, and cheese all showing production increases. A creamery association was formed to develop and market dairy products, often to the major market of metropolitan New York City. In addition to licensed taverns, inns, and hotel, the business directory included dry goods, hardware, furniture, grocery, druggists, carriagemakers, coopers, harness makers, shoemakers, foundry, cigar company, telegraph, ice cream parlor, marble works, doctors, dentists, lawyers, and other vocations.

The railroad bypassed Franklin, except for the Ontario & Western's Franklin Depot. When the trustees of the D.L.I. voted to ask the Board of Regents to establish teacher training at the school, the end result was the founding of a normal school in Oneonta for teacher training. This has developed into SUNY Oneonta. A gradual decline in population continued through the first half of the 20th century, but it was reversed as people began to buy homes in the town for retirement or as second homes for recreation.

The Ouleout Valley Cemetery on Route 357, begun in 1873, often draws attention to its handsome iron gate and well-manicured grounds. The massive Erastus Edgerton Monument is impressive. The Soldiers' Monument was dedicated in 1889 to veterans particularly of the American Civil War, and annual Memorial Day observances have been held there since for all veterans.

Many of the community and fraternal organizations were started in the mid-19th century. Members of the volunteer Fire Department, Masonic Lodge, Odd Fellows Lodge, Sportsmen's Association, Washington Reading Circle, Onesiphori, and the Free Library have all contributed to Franklin's way of life.

Treadwell and Franklin also had strong chapters of the Woman's Christian Temperance Union (WCTU) and the Good Templars, organized to try to suppress drinking and drunkenness. In the 20th century, local sales of alcoholic beverages were controlled through the issuance of licenses by the town government. The fees collected were often used to aid the less fortunate.

In 1990, the census showed the town of Franklin with a population of 2,471, with 409 of them in the village of Franklin. The number of active farms continued to decline, absentee ownership increased, few new businesses survive, a substantial number of people retired or commuted to work. Franklin Central School completed a building program in 1991. An annual Franklin Day is held in August to raise funds for the preservation of Stone Hall.

In 1983, the village of Franklin was recognized for its architectural qualities and placed on the National Register of Historic Places as a historic district. This noteworthy honor has aided the continued preservation of Franklin's architectural treasures.

In 1992, the town of Franklin celebrated its bicentennial with many events. On July 25, 1992, dozens of groups marched along Main Street in the bicentennial parade, which was videotaped for later viewing. The Ouleout Valley Historical Society published Throughout the Years in the Town of Franklin 1792-1992. Some groups still march to this day with community leader Adam Davidson. He and fellow screenplay writer Keith have made their mark on the town.

== Geography ==
Franklin lies in the northern part of Delaware County. It is bordered by Otsego County on the north, the towns of Davenport and Meredith on the east, the towns of Delhi, Hamden, and Walton on the south, and the town of Sidney on the west. Franklin has views of forested hills, streams, ponds, historic homes and commercial buildings, and numerous winding roads. Its surface is hilly upland made of shaly loam atop hardpan, while the valleys consist of gravelly loam and alluvium. Ouleout Creek, which flows west into the Susquehanna River, is the main surface water feature. Its tributaries are Handsome Brook and Croton Creek.

According to the United States Census Bureau, the town has a total area of 81.5 square miles (211.2 km^{2}), of which 81.2 square miles (210.4 km^{2}) is land and 0.27 square miles (0.7 km^{2}), or 0.34%, is water.

== Demographics ==
Historical population
Census	Pop.	Note	%±
1820	2,481		—
1830	2,775		11.9%
1840	3,025		9.0%
1850	3,087		2.0%
1860	3,308		7.2%
1870	3,283		−0.8%
1880	2,907		−11.5%
1890	2,897		−0.3%
1900	2,529		−12.7%
1910	2,403		−5.0%
1920	2,132		−11.3%
1930	2,037		−4.5%
1940	2,019		−0.9%
1950	2,156		6.8%
1960	2,133		−1.1%
1970	2,202		3.2%
1980	2,431		10.4%
1990	2,471		1.6%
2000	2,621		6.1%
2010	2,411		−8.0%
2020	2,288		−5.1%
U.S. Decennial Census

As of the census of 2000, there were 2,621 people, 1,026 households, and 725 families residing in the town. The population density was 32.2 inhabitants per square mile (12.4/km^{2}). There were 1,371 housing units at an average density of 16.8 per square mile (6.5/km^{2}). The racial makeup of the town was 98.51% White, 0.69% Black or African American, 0.04% Native American, 0.15% Asian, 0.31% from other races, and 0.31% from two or more races. Hispanic or Latino of any race were 0.72% of the population.

There were 1,026 households, out of which 31.6% had children under the age of 18 living with them, 60.7% were married couples living together, 6.4% had a female householder with no husband present, and 29.3% were non-families. 24.1% of all households were made up of individuals, and 11.8% had someone living alone who was 65 years of age or older. The average household size was 2.55 and the average family size was 3.01.

In the town, the population was spread out, with 24.9% under the age of 18, 6.1% from 18 to 24, 25.9% from 25 to 44, 26.6% from 45 to 64, and 16.4% who were 65 years of age or older. The median age was 41 years. For every 100 females, there were 99.6 males. For every 100 females age 18 and over, there were 95.2 males.

The median income for a household in the town was $35,417, and the median income for a family was $44,519. Males had a median income of $26,367 versus $22,625 for females. The per capita income for the town was $17,477. About 7.7% of families and 10.4% of the population were below the poverty line, including 13.3% of those under age 18 and 5.3% of those age 65 or over.

== Communities and locations in the town of Franklin ==
- Bartlett Hollow – a hamlet southwest of Franklin village on Route 357.
- Brooklyn – a former hamlet north of Franklin village.
- Franklin – the village of Franklin on Route 357.
- Leonta – a former hamlet northeast of Franklin village on Route 357.
- Merrickville – a hamlet south of Bartlett Hollow
- North Franklin – a location in the northeastern part of the town.
- Treadwell – a hamlet northeast of the village on County Highway 14.
