= Delaware County Courthouse =

Delaware County Courthouse may refer to:

- Delaware County Courthouse (Iowa), Manchester, Iowa
- Delaware County Courthouse Square District, in Delhi, New York
- Delaware County Courthouse (Ohio), Delaware, Ohio
- Delaware County Courthouse (Pennsylvania), Media, Pennsylvania
