= East Masonville Creek =

- Location of the mouth of East Masonville Creek

Location
- Country: United States
- State: New York
- County: Delaware

Physical characteristics
- Source
  - coordinates: 42°16′50″N 75°17′45″W
- Mouth: Masonville Creek
  - coordinates: 42°14′39″N 75°22′07″W
  - elevation: 1,296 ft (395 m)

Basin features
- Tributaries
  - left: Ivanhoe Brook

East Masonville Creek is a river in Delaware County, New York. It flows into Masonville Creek in Masonville.
