= Sidney Union Station =

Sidney
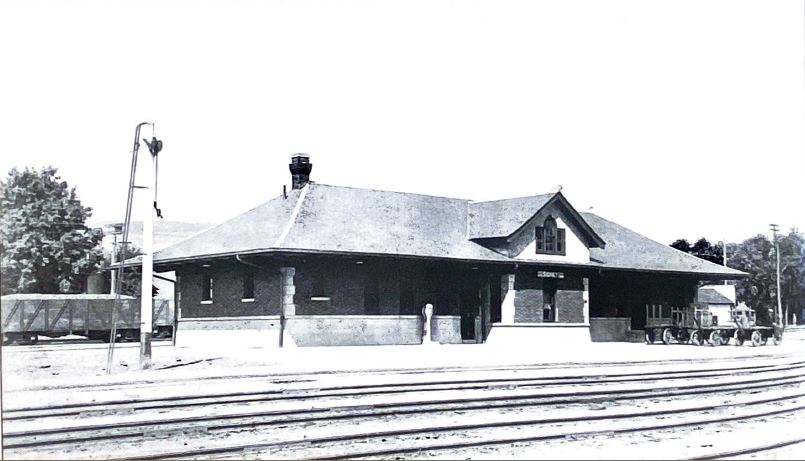
- Brick and Stone station, built 1913.

General information
- Location: Sidney, New York
- Coordinates: 42.312992°N 75.392010°W
- Operator: D&H, NYO&W

Construction
- Architectural style: Board-and-batten (1868–1913); Brick and stone (1913-1980s)

Other information
- Status: Demolished (1980s)

History
- Closed: 1963 (passenger service)
- Rebuilt: 1913

Former services
Preceding station	Delaware and Hudson Railway	Following station
Bainbridge toward Binghamton	Susquehanna Division	Unadilla toward Albany
Preceding station	New York, Ontario and Western Railway	Following station
Norwich toward Oswego	Main Line	Delhi toward Weehawken
Terminus	New Berlin Branch	East Guilford toward Edmeston
Location

Sidney Union Station was a railroad station in Sidney, New York. The station was located between the tracks of the Delaware and Hudson on its north side and the New York, Ontario and Western Railway on its south side.

The Albany and Susquehanna Railroad rail head reached Sidney on October 22, 1866, and the original station building was erected in 1868. The Albany and Susquehanna would go on to be absorbed into the Delaware and Hudson. The board-and-batten structure was replaced with a modern brick and stone station in 1913. NYO&W passenger service to the station was discontinued in 1929. The D&H ended it on January 24, 1963. The site is now home to a 23-acre Amphenol solar farm.

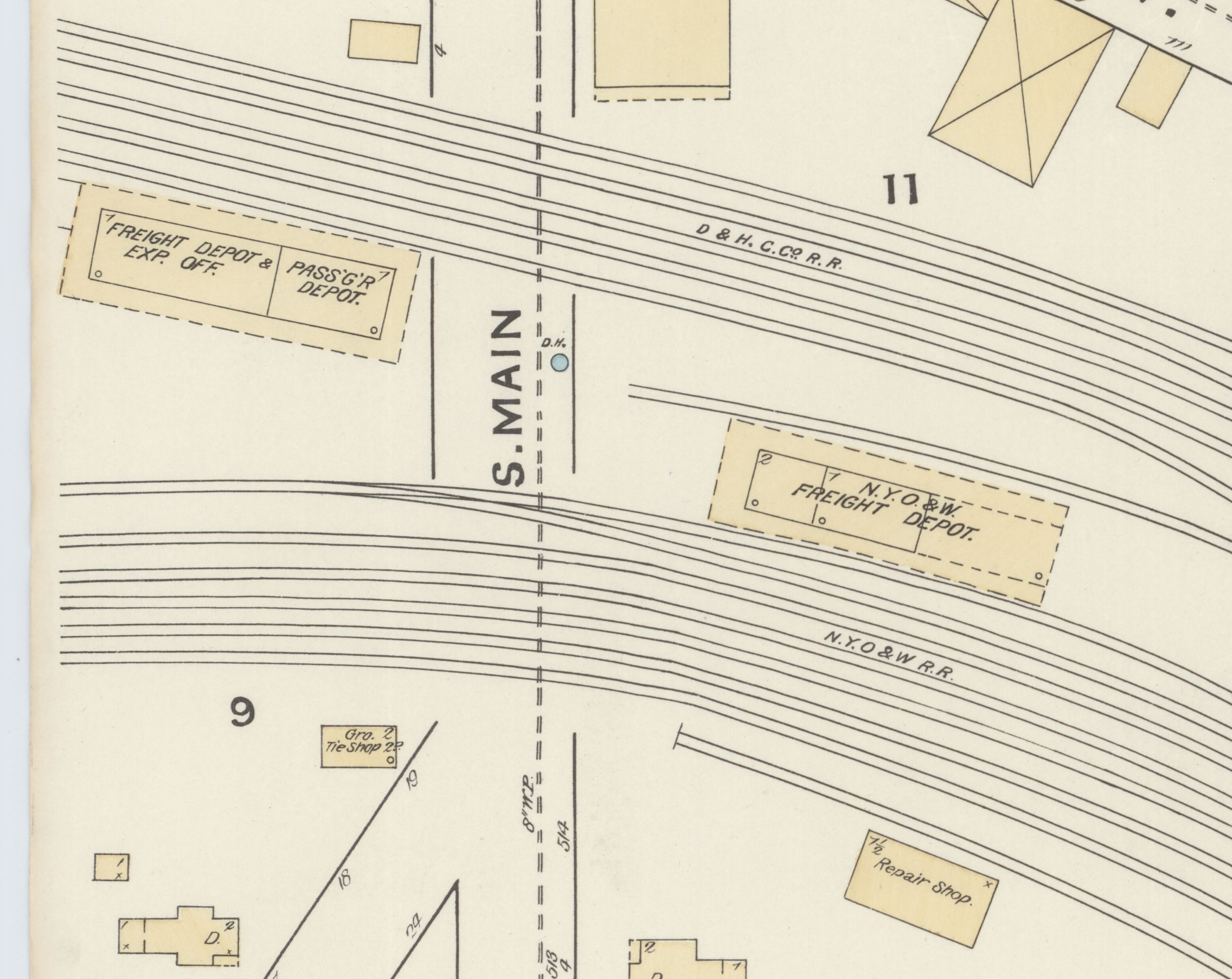
Sanborn Fire Insurance Map of the station and freight facilities, July 1891. The passenger station is on the upper left of frame and the NYO&W freight depot is right of center.
