= Hatfield Motor Company =

Hatfield Motor Company may refer to:

- Hatfield Motor Vehicle Company
- Cortland Cart & Carriage Company that produced cars between 1912-1924 under Hatfield brand.
