= James Hamilton Ballagh =

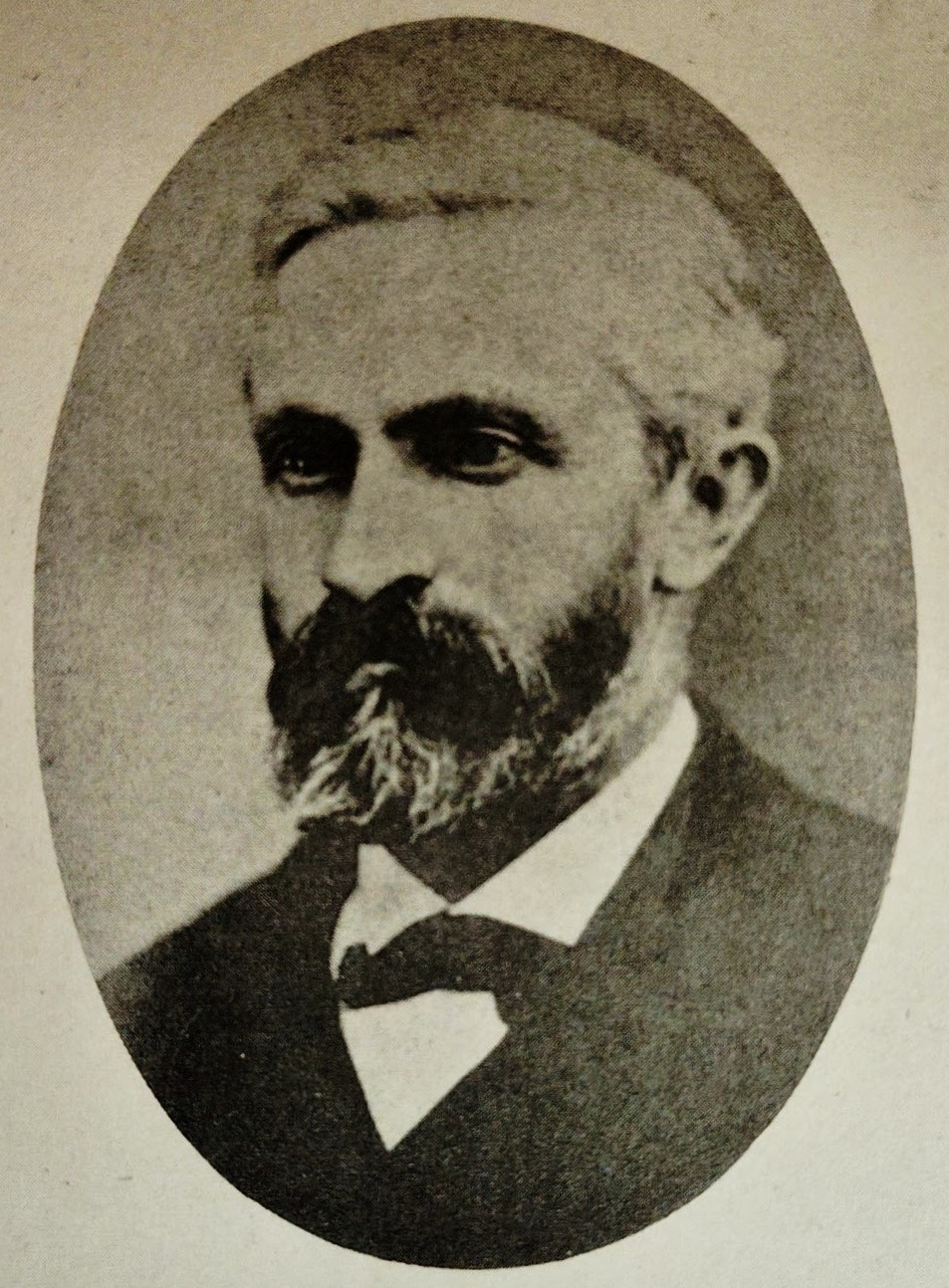
- Born: September 7, 1832; Hobart, New York, U.S.
- Died: January 29, 1920 (aged 87); Richmond, Virginia, U.S.
- Occupations: missionary; pastor; educator
- Known for: Early promoter of Christianity in Japan
- Relatives: John Craig Ballagh (brother)

James H. Ballagh (1832–1920) was an American missionary who was instrumental in introducing Protestant Christianity to Japan.

== Early life ==
Ballagh's parents, John Hamilton Ballagh and Anne Prudencia Craig, had immigrated from Ireland to the United States, eventually settling in Hobart, New York, where he and his ten siblings were born. They were initially Presbyterians but later converted to the Dutch Reformed Church.

After reading about the need for missionaries, he was inspired to become one himself. He attended Rutgers University before completing study at the New Brunswick Theological Seminary in 1860.

== Career ==
When Duane B. Simmons left the Dutch Reformed Church missionaries the following year, Ballagh was invited to replace him. He and his wife Margaret Tate traveled to Japan, settling in Yokohama in 1861.

The couple shared a compound with other missionaries such as Samuel Robbins Brown and James Curtis Hepburn and discreetly promoted their religion in spite of its illegal status in Japan at the time. They worked to translate the Gospel of John with the help of Rizuan Yano, who Ballagh later baptized in the earliest Protestant Christian baptism in Japan.

A major 1866 fire in the Yokohama settlement destroyed the initial translations, but Ballagh, Hepburn, and another missionary, David Thompson, worked to remake the translation. Hepburn completed the translation of that and other Gospels.

In 1871, Ballagh started working as an English teacher at the Takashima School, but after a while he left the post to his brother, John Craig Ballagh. James Ballagh continued teaching English independently in a small stone house to a group of twenty to forty students. On March 19, 1872, he baptized nine men who then elected a deacon and established the Kaigan Church. This was the first Protestant church in Japan, and Ballagh served as the temporary pastor.

The edict against Christianity in Japan was abolished in 1873, and Ballagh and his fellow missionaries began to preach and recruit more openly. He taught English at schools such as the Yokohama Academy and Doremus School in the following decades.

In 1907, he returned to Rutgers and received an honorary doctorate in theology for his missionary work.

Ballagh died while on vacation in Richmond, Virginia in 1920.

== Personal life ==
Ballagh married Margaret Tate Kinnear on May 15, 1861. She published a collection of her letters from their first five-year stay in Japan under the title "Glimpses of Old Japan 1861-1866." They had three daughters and a son.

One daughter, Carrie Elizabeth Ballagh, married Frank Harrel, an Episcopal missionary physician who introduced baseball to Sendai.
