= First Presbyterian Church (Delhi, New York) =

Historic church in New York, United States

- U.S. National Register of Historic Places
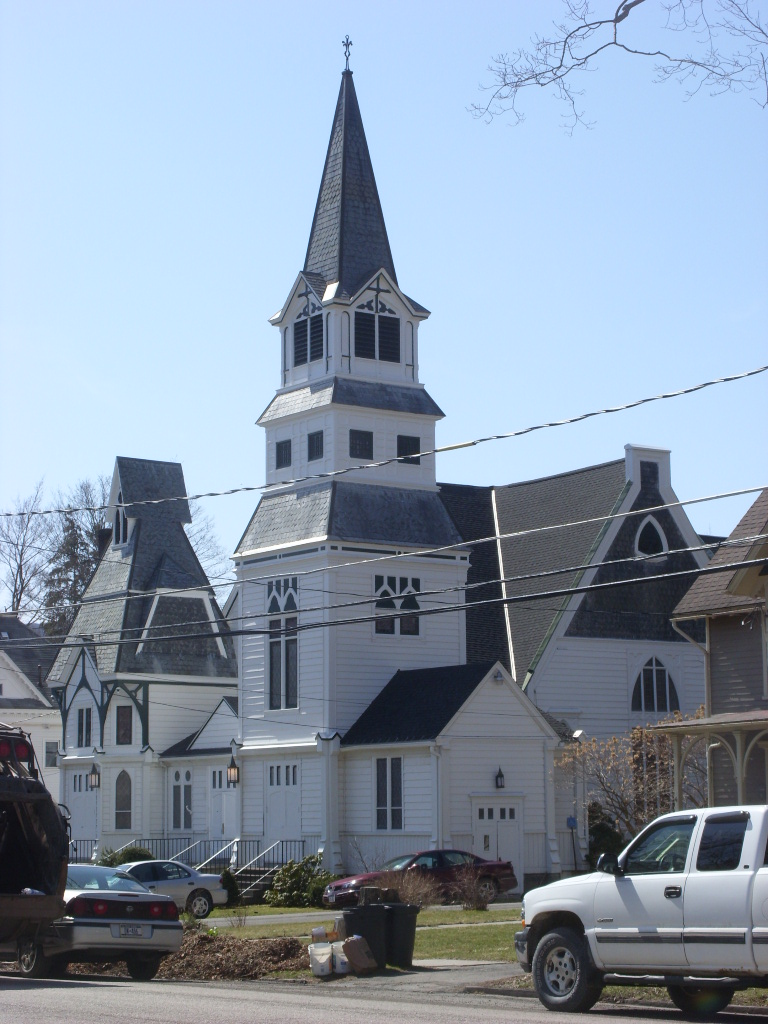
- First Presbyterian Church, April 2009

- Location within New York Location within the United States
- Location: Clinton St., Delhi, New York
- Coordinates: 42°16′28″N 74°55′21″W
- Area: 2 acres (0.81 ha)
- Built: 1882
- Architect: Perry, Isaac G.; Meeker, A.M., et al.
- Architectural style: Late Victorian
- NRHP reference No.: 05001616
- Added to NRHP: February 1, 2006

First Presbyterian Church is a historic Presbyterian church located at Delhi in Delaware County, New York. It is a large wood-frame building on a cut stone foundation designed by Isaac G. Perry and built in 1880–1882.

It was added to the National Register of Historic Places in 2006.

== See also ==
- National Register of Historic Places listings in Delaware County, New York
