= Orrin Peck =

American painter (1860–1921)

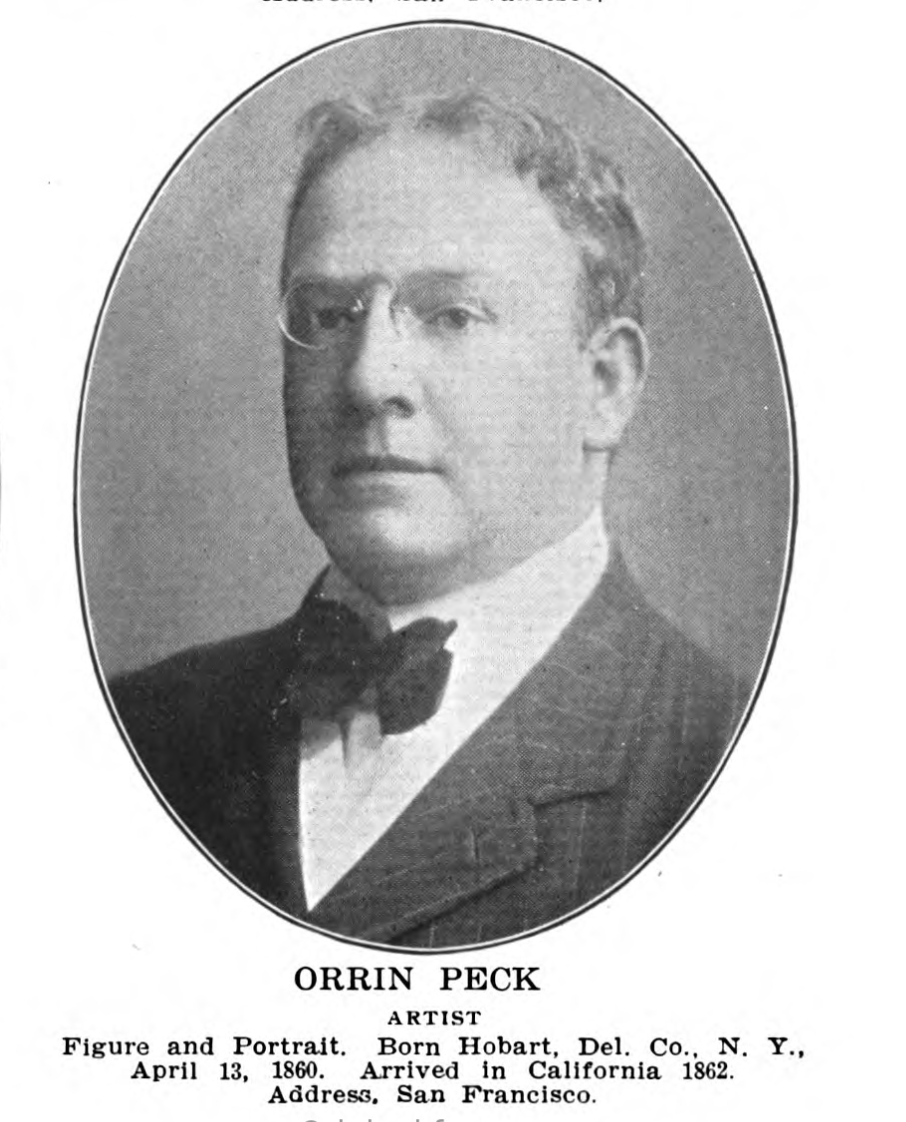
- Born: Orrin M. Peck; April 13, 1860; Hobart, New York, United States
- Died: January 20, 1921 (aged 60); Los Angeles, California, United States
- Burial place: Cypress Lawn Memorial Park, Colma, California, United States
- Other name: Orin Peck
- Education: Royal Academy of Munich
- Occupation: Painter
- Known for: landscape painting, portrait painting

Orrin M. Peck (April 13, 1860 – January 20, 1921) was an American painter. He was known for his landscape and portrait oil paintings. Peck was active in San Francisco; London, England; and Munich, Germany.

== Early life and education ==
Orrin M. Peck was born April 13, 1860, in Hobart, Delaware County, New York. In 1863 when he was young, the family moved to San Francisco, California via ship around the Isthmus of Panama. While aboard the ship, Peck's mom befriended Phoebe Hearst who was traveling with her newborn son William Randolph Hearst. The two families stayed in touch over the years.

Peck studied art at Royal Academy of Munich (now the Academy of Fine Arts, Munich) in Munich, Germany, under Nikolaos Gyzis (sic. N. Gijsis), and Ludwig von Löfftz.

== Career ==
After his education, he purchased the "White House" on Tite Street in Chelsea district of London, England, United Kingdom; the former home of James McNeill Whistler.

In his early career, Peck was primarily a landscape painter, and in his later career he shifted toward portrait painting. Notable portrait subjects by Peck included George Hearst, Phoebe A. Hearst, William Randolph Hearst, James D. Phelan, Charles S. Wheeler, Martin Kellogg, and Benjamin Ide Wheeler.

He had been a Bohemian Club member. At the World's Columbian Exposition in Chicago, Peck won a gold metal for a painting.

After the death of architect Newton J. Tharp in 1909, many of the San Francisco painters came together under the leadership of Charles J. Dickson to hold an exhibition in his honor at the California Club in San Francisco, including Peck, Maynard Dixon, Arthur F. Matthews, Xavier Martínez, Giuseppe Cadenasso, Eugen Neuhaus, Ernest Peixotto, Will Sparks, Gordon Coutts, Ferdinand Burgdorff, Francis McComas, and Theodore Wores.

== Death and legacy ==
He died after a heart issue on January 20, 1921, while visiting a friend in Los Angeles, California. His funeral service was at Episcopal Church of St. John the Evangelist, on 15th Street in the Mission District of San Francisco, and he was buried at Cypress Lawn Cemetery (now Cypress Lawn Memorial Park) in Colma, California.

Peck's papers are held at the Huntington Library in San Marino, California.
