= Scintilla Magneto Company =

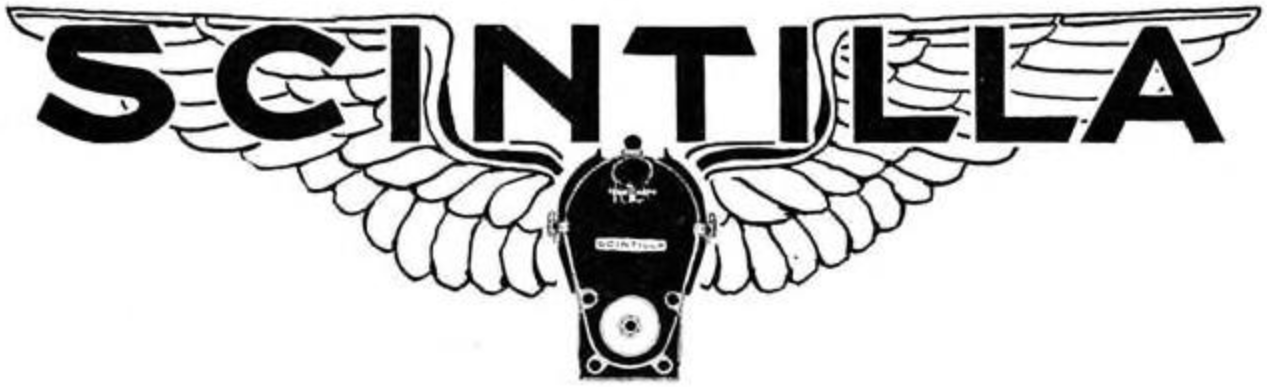
- Industry: Aerospace
- Headquarters: Sidney, New York, United States
- Number of employees: 8,600+ (1944)
- Parent: Bendix Corporation

The Scintilla Magneto Company was an American manufacturer of aircraft and automobile magnetos.

== History ==
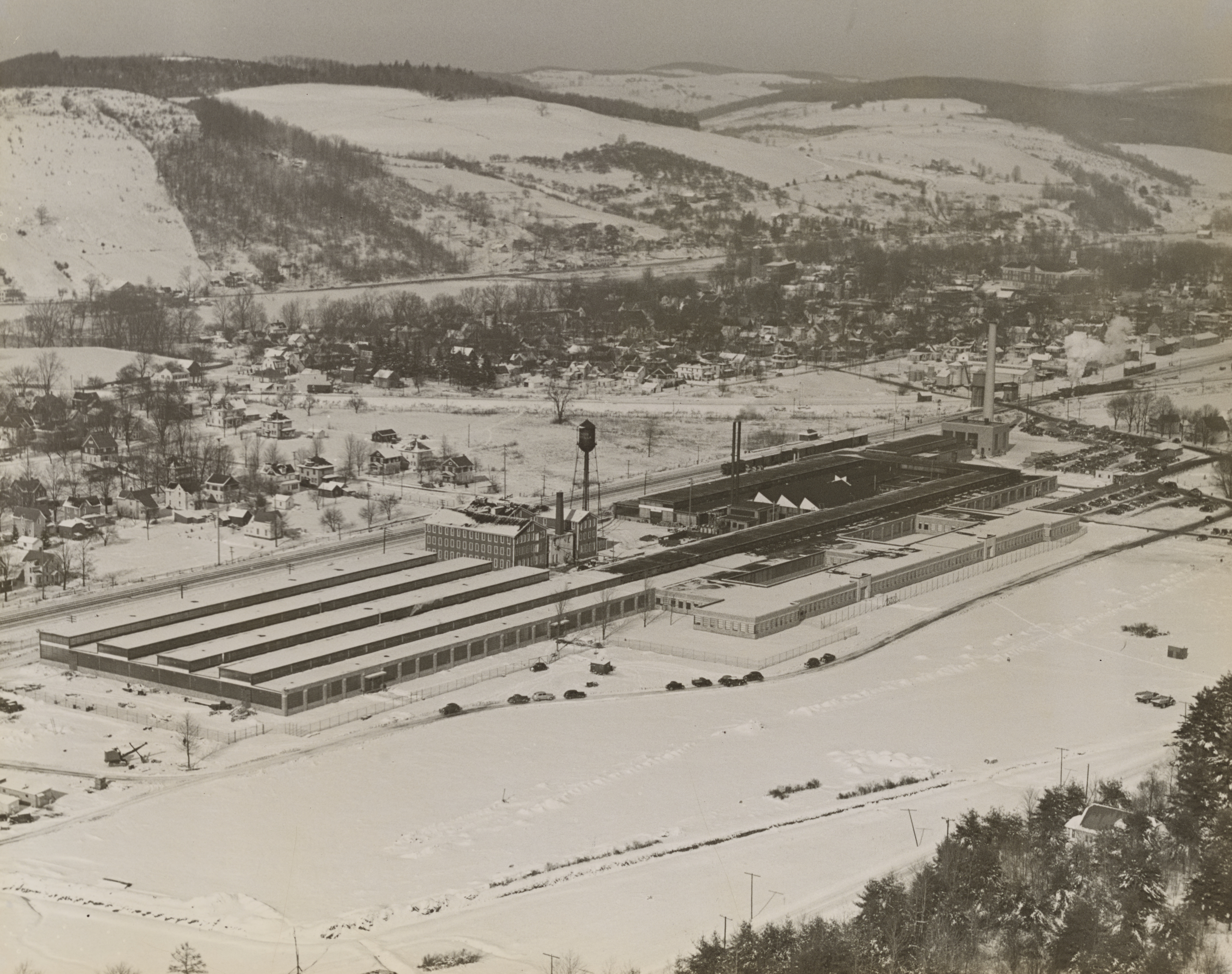
Scintilla Magneto factory in Sidney, New York in 1941

The origins of the company lie in the development of a magneto by Swiss engineers. The rights to the design was purchased by an American and brought to the United States in 1921. The company was originally located in New York City, but was convinced by a local businessman named Winfield Sherwood to move to the site of the recently bankrupt Cortland Cart & Carriage Company in Sidney, New York in the mid-1920s. In 1925, it was purchased by an American subsidiary of the Swiss Brown, Boveri & Company. The company was later purchased by Bendix Corporation in 1929 and became the Scintilla Magneto Division. The acquisition of the Hurley Townsend Corporation in 1935 led to an expansion of the plant and a housing project was begun to accommodate all of the new workers. During World War II, the company was a key manufacturer of magnetos used on American aircraft engines such as the Allison V-1710. Its name was changed to the Electrical Components Division in 1966. The Bendix Engine Products Division was split off in 1980 and moved to Jacksonville, Florida a few years later. By 1985, the portion remaining in Sidney had been renamed Bendix Connector Operations. The Amphenol Products Division was bought from AlliedSignal by LPL Investment Group in 1987. The former Scintilla factory was occupied by the Amphenol Aerospace Corporation until 2011 when, after being flooded in 2006, restored at great expense, and flooded again in 2011, the main factory was demolished. The plating annex still operates on the site but the majority of the site is now a solar farm. The Amphenol Aerospace offices and manufacturing were moved to a nearby location in Sidney NY, on higher ground.
