= Erskine L. Seeley House =

Historic house in New York, United States

- U.S. National Register of Historic Places
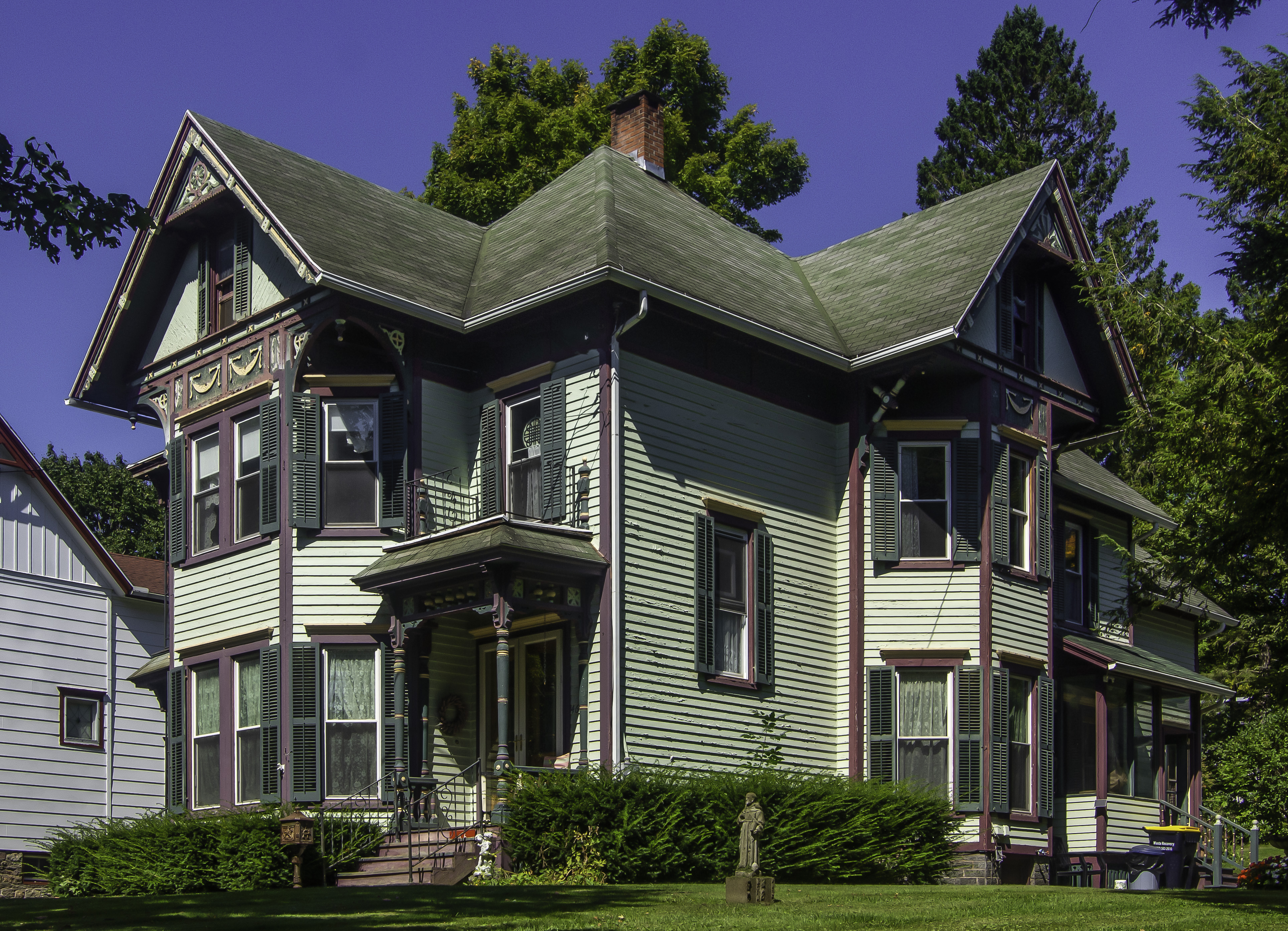

- Location within New York Location within the United States
- Location: 46 Main St., Stamford, New York
- Coordinates: 42°24′28″N 74°36′48″W
- Area: 0.9 acres (0.36 ha)
- Built: 1890
- NRHP reference No.: 10000593
- Added to NRHP: August 30, 2010

Erskine L. Seeley House is a historic home located at Stamford in Delaware County, New York. It was built about 1890 and is a 2 1/2-story, balloon frame house clad in wood clapboard siding on a bluestone foundation. The front facade features a 2-story, three-sided, canted bay window under a large projecting gable. Also on the property is a small carriage house converted to a garage in the early 20th century.

It was added to the National Register of Historic Places in 2010.
