= Hobart Masonic Hall =

- U.S. National Register of Historic Places
- Location within New York Location within the United States
- Location: 6 Cornell Ave., Hobart, New York
- Coordinates: 42°22′22″N 74°40′2″W
- Area: less than one acre
- Built: 1889
- Architectural style: Stick/Eastlake
- NRHP reference No.: 01001399
- Added to NRHP: December 28, 2001

The Hobart Masonic Hall is a historic building located in the village of Hobart in Delaware County, New York, United States. It was originally constructed in 1889 as a meeting hall for St. Andrews Lodge No. 289 of Freemasons, although it is no longer used for that purpose.

The building is a 2 1/2-story wood-frame building on a rubble stone foundation in the Stick-Eastlake style. The building is rectangular in shape with a small cross gable wing on the west elevation.

Currently the building houses a local history museum, operated by the Hobart Historical Society. It was listed on the National Register of Historic Places in 2001.

== See also ==
- National Register of Historic Places listings in Delaware County, New York
