= St. Peter's Episcopal Church Complex (Hobart, New York) =

Historic church in New York, United States

- U.S. National Register of Historic Places
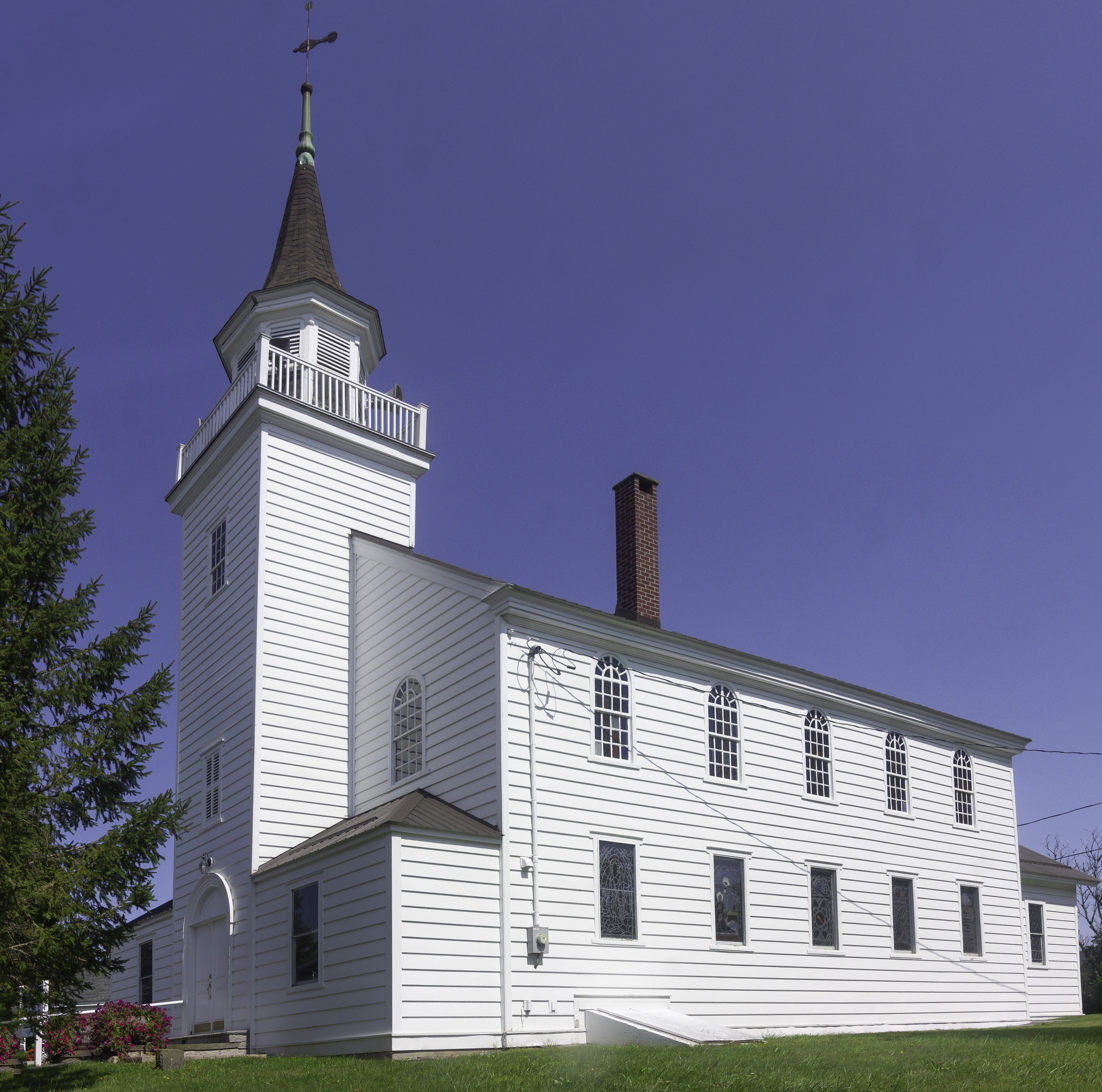

- Location within New York Location within the United States
- Location: Jct. of Pine and Church Sts., Hobart, New York
- Coordinates: 42°22′13″N 74°40′13″W
- Area: 4 acres (1.6 ha)
- Built: 1801
- Architectural style: Federal, Greek Revival
- NRHP reference No.: 98000948
- Added to NRHP: July 31, 1998

St. Peter's Episcopal Church Complex is a historic Episcopal church complex at the junction of Pine and Church Streets in Hobart, Delaware County, New York. It sits on top of Pine Hill, the highest point in the village.

== History ==
Ever since a 1794 visit to what was then called Watertown by Reverend Walter Clark Gardner, Episcopal residents of the area had been interested in forming a congregation of their own. Trustees were elected later that year and planning began for the design of a church building. It wasn't until 1801 that a location was agreed on and construction could begin. The building process moved steadily, and the church's first service was held on Christmas Eve of that year.

The church was consecrated in 1819 by John Henry Hobart, Bishop of the Episcopal Diocese of New York and later namesake of the village of Hobart.

It was added to the National Register of Historic Places in 1998.

== Architecture ==
The complex includes the church, cemetery, rectory, and carriage house. The church is a small frame building, 48 feet by 38 feet, with a stone foundation, clapboard siding, and a gable roof. It features a central projecting square tower surmounted by a wooden balustrade and an octagonal louvered belfry with steeple.

== See also ==
- National Register of Historic Places listings in Delaware County, New York
