= Churchill Park Historic District =

Historic district in New York, United States

- U.S. National Register of Historic Places
- U.S. Historic district
- Location within New York Location within the United States
- Location: NY 10 and NY 23 and W. Main St., Stamford, New York
- Coordinates: 42°24′52″N 74°37′30″W
- Area: 82 acres (33 ha)
- Architect: Churchill, Dr. Stephen; Bristol, Dr. E.L.
- Architectural style: Late 19th And 20th Century Revivals, Late Victorian
- NRHP reference No.: 80004609
- Added to NRHP: November 17, 1980

Churchill Park Historic District is a national historic district located at Stamford in Delaware County, New York, United States. The district contains 52 contributing buildings. It consists of a group of structures built between 1870 and 1920 as summer homes, hotels, and boarding houses.

It was listed on the National Register of Historic Places in 1980.

== See also ==
- National Register of Historic Places listings in Delaware County, New York
