= Harpersfield, New York =

- Town
- Location within New York Location within the United States
- Coordinates: 42°26′7″N 74°40′15″W
- Country: United States
- State: New York
- County: Delaware

Government
  - Type: Town Council
  - Town Supervisor: James E. Eisel (R)
  - Town Council: Members' List: • Harold Bedford (D); • Morris Riddell, Jr. (D); • Robert Reeve, Jr. (R); • Catherine Straus (R)

Area
  - Total: 42.29 sq mi (109.52 km^{2})
  - Land: 42.02 sq mi (108.83 km^{2})
  - Water: 0.27 sq mi (0.69 km^{2})
- Elevation: 1,824 ft (556 m)

Population (2020)
  - Total: 1,442
- Time zone: UTC-5 (Eastern (EST))
  - Summer (DST): UTC-4 (EDT)
- ZIP Codes: 13786 (Harpersfield); 12093 (Jefferson); 13750 (Davenport); 12167 (Stamford); 13842 (South Kortright); 13788 (Hobart)
- Area code: 607
- FIPS code: 36-025-32281
- GNIS feature ID: 0979049
- Website: www.townofharpersfield.gov

Harpersfield is a town in Delaware County, New York, United States. The population was 1,442 at the 2020 census. The town is on the northern border of the county.

== History ==
Colonel John Harper and his brothers purchased the land that would become Harpersfield in 1768, and the family's first permanent structure was built in 1771; the settlement was burned by Loyalist and Native American forces allied with Joseph Brant and John Butler in 1777, and the town was formally organized in 1787.

== Geography ==
The northern town line is the border of Otsego County, while the northeastern town boundary is the border of Schoharie County. The village of Stamford is on the town's southeastern border.

According to the United States Census Bureau, the town has a total area of 42.3 square miles (109.5 km^{2}), of which 42.0 square miles (108.8 km^{2}) is land and 0.3 square miles (0.7 km^{2}), or 0.63%, is water. The northern three-quarters of the town drains westward via Charlotte Creek and several tributaries to the Susquehanna River near Oneonta, while the remainder drains south to the West Branch Delaware River, which forms the south town boundary.

== Demographics ==
Historical population
Census	Pop.	Note	%±
1820	1,884		—
1830	1,936		2.8%
1840	1,708		−11.8%
1850	1,613		−5.6%
1860	1,468		−9.0%
1870	1,485		1.2%
1880	1,420		−4.4%
1890	1,386		−2.4%
1900	1,221		−11.9%
1910	1,244		1.9%
1920	1,184		−4.8%
1930	1,265		6.8%
1940	1,200		−5.1%
1950	1,263		5.3%
1960	1,193		−5.5%
1970	1,423		19.3%
1980	1,495		5.1%
1990	1,450		−3.0%
2000	1,603		10.6%
2010	1,577		−1.6%
2020	1,442		−8.6%
U.S. Decennial Census

As of the census of 2000, there were 1,603 people, 591 households, and 416 families residing in the town. The population density was 38.0 inhabitants per square mile (14.7/km^{2}). There were 913 housing units at an average density of 21.7 per square mile (8.4/km^{2}). The racial makeup of the town was 97.82% White, 0.56% African American, 0.31% Native American, 0.31% Asian, 0.25% from other races, and 0.75% from two or more races. Hispanic or Latino of any race were 2.99% of the population.

There were 591 households, out of which 26.6% had children under the age of 18 living with them, 58.0% were married couples living together, 8.3% had a female householder with no husband present, and 29.6% were non-families. 23.9% of all households were made up of individuals, and 11.3% had someone living alone who was 65 years of age or older. The average household size was 2.48 and the average family size was 2.92.

In the town, the population was spread out, with 21.5% under the age of 18, 6.6% from 18 to 24, 20.4% from 25 to 44, 26.6% from 45 to 64, and 25.0% who were 65 years of age or older. The median age was 46 years. For every 100 females, there were 90.6 males. For every 100 females age 18 and over, there were 89.0 males.

The median income for a household in the town was $33,333, and the median income for a family was $37,446. Males had a median income of $27,237 versus $21,500 for females. The per capita income for the town was $18,863. About 12.5% of families and 18.3% of the population were below the poverty line, including 38.0% of those under age 18 and 7.4% of those age 65 or over.

== Communities and locations in Harpersfield ==
- Harpersfield – The hamlet of Harpersfield.
- North Harpersfield – A hamlet on CR 29.
- West Harpersfield – A location at the intersection of NY 23 and CR 33.
- Stamford – Part of the village of Stamford is in the northeastern corner of the town.
- Sturges Corners – A location on CR 29 near its western terminus with NY 23.
