= Masonville Creek =

- Location of the mouth of Masonville Creek

Location
- Country: United States
- State: New York
- County: Delaware

Physical characteristics
- Source
  - coordinates: 42°16′27″N 75°19′51″W
- Mouth: Bennettsville Creek
  - coordinates: 42°15′10″N 75°26′01″W
  - elevation: 1,079 ft (329 m)

Basin features
- Tributaries
  - left: East Masonville Creek

Masonville Creek is a river in Delaware County, New York. It flows into the Bennettsville Creek east of Bennettsville.
