= Stamford (village), New York =

Stamford, New York
- Village
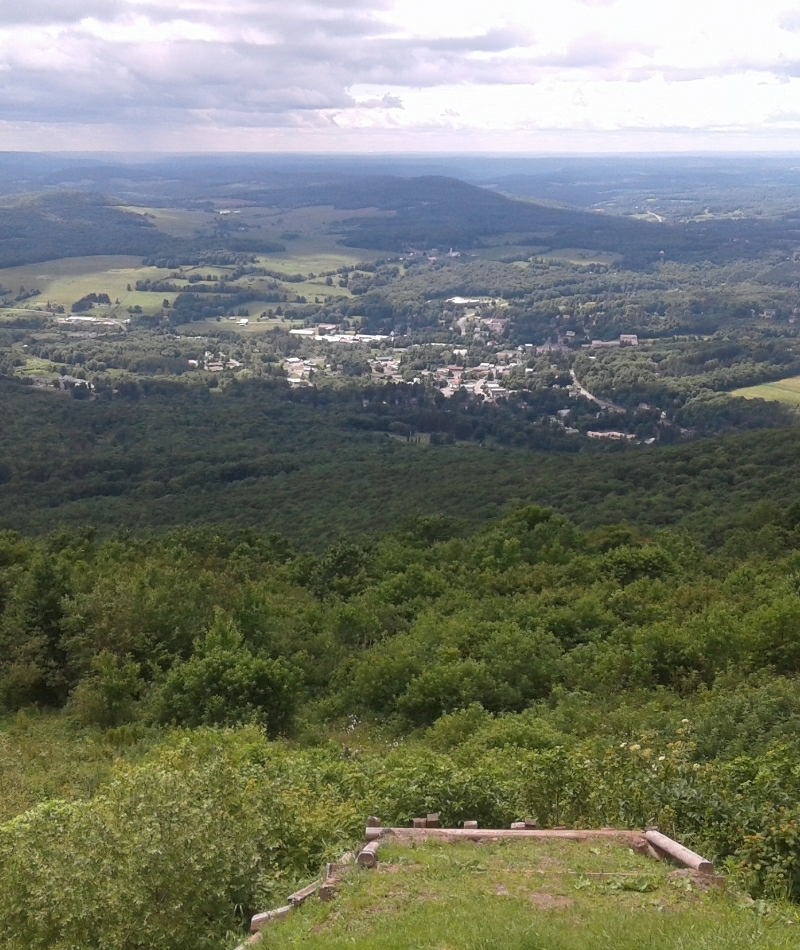
- View of Stamford from Utsayantha Mountain

- Location within the state of New York
- Coordinates: 42°25′N 74°37′W
- Country: United States
- State: New York
- County: Delaware
- Towns: Stamford, Harpersfield

Government
  - Type: Mayor/Board of Trustees
  - Mayor: Robert Schneider

Area
  - Total: 1.34 sq mi (3.47 km^{2})
  - Land: 1.33 sq mi (3.45 km^{2})
  - Water: 0.0077 sq mi (0.02 km^{2})
- Elevation: 1,818 ft (554 m)

Population (2020)
  - Total: 1,040
  - Density: 780.4/sq mi (301.33/km^{2})
- Time zone: UTC-5 (Eastern (EST))
  - Summer (DST): UTC-4 (EDT)
- ZIP code: 12167
- Area code: 607
- FIPS code: 36-70618
- GNIS feature ID: 0966210
- Website: villageofstamfordny.gov

Stamford is a village in Delaware County, New York, United States. The population was 1,119 at the 2010 census. The village is located partly in the town of Stamford and partly in the town of Harpersfield. The village is on routes 23 and 10. The village has termed itself the "Queen of the Catskills".

== History ==
The area was visited by farmers and trappers in the 18th century. The village was incorporated in 1870. By the early part of the 20th century Stamford reached its peak as a tourist area, mostly aided by the arrival of the Ulster and Delaware Railroad from Kingston in 1872. Passenger service lasted until March 31, 1954; freight service until September 28, 1976.

The Churchill Park Historic District and Erskine L. Seeley House are listed on the National Register of Historic Places.

== Geography ==
Stamford is located in northeastern Delaware County at 42°25′N 74°37′W (42.4116, -74.6189). The village is in the Catskill Mountains. The headwaters of the West Branch Delaware River passes through the center of the village and forms the boundary between the town of Harpersfield to the west and the town of Stamford to the east. Slightly more than half of the village is in the town of Stamford.

New York State Routes 10 and 23 intersect on the west side of the village. NY 10 leads north 24 miles (39 km) to Cobleskill and southwest 20 miles (32 km) to Delhi, while NY 23 leads west 26 miles (42 km) to Oneonta and east 49 miles (79 km) to Catskill.

According to the United States Census Bureau, the village of Stamford has a total area of 1.4 square miles (3.5 km^{2}), of which 0.01 square miles (0.02 km^{2}), or 0.66%, is water.

== Demographics ==
Historical population
Census	Pop.	Note	%±
1880	522		—
1890	819		56.9%
1900	901		10.0%
1910	973		8.0%
1920	947		−2.7%
1930	1,103		16.5%
1940	1,088		−1.4%
1950	1,162		6.8%
1960	1,166		0.3%
1970	1,286		10.3%
1980	1,240		−3.6%
1990	1,211		−2.3%
2000	1,265		4.5%
2010	1,119		−11.5%
2020	1,040		−7.1%
U.S. Decennial Census

As of the census of 2000, there were 1,265 people, 496 households, and 290 families residing in the village. The population density was 954.3 inhabitants per square mile (368.5/km^{2}). There were 621 housing units at an average density of 468.5 per square mile (180.9/km^{2}). The racial makeup of the village was 97.55% White, 0.40% Black or African American, 0.08% Native American, 0.63% Asian, 0.40% from other races, and 0.95% from two or more races. Hispanic or Latino of any race were 3.64% of the population.

There were 496 households, out of which 28.2% had children under the age of 18 living with them, 44.6% were married couples living together, 10.3% had a female householder with no husband present, and 41.5% were non-families. 34.5% of all households were made up of individuals, and 16.1% had someone living alone who was 65 years of age or older. The average household size was 2.28 and the average family size was 2.99.

In the village, the population was spread out, with 22.2% under the age of 18, 6.4% from 18 to 24, 21.1% from 25 to 44, 24.0% from 45 to 64, and 26.2% who were 65 years of age or older. The median age was 45 years. For every 100 females, there were 88.0 males. For every 100 females age 18 and over, there were 83.9 males.

The median income for a household in the village was $30,664, and the median income for a family was $38,864. Males had a median income of $27,500 versus $21,607 for females. The per capita income for the village was $18,012. About 9.4% of families and 15.2% of the population were below the poverty line, including 22.8% of those under age 18 and 13.6% of those age 65 or over.

== Attractions ==
The village of Stamford is a stop on the Catskill Scenic Trail, a multi-use rail trail following the former route of the Ulster and Delaware Railroad. Catskill is also home of the Headwaters Trails.
