= Stamford, New York =

Village in New York, United States

- Town
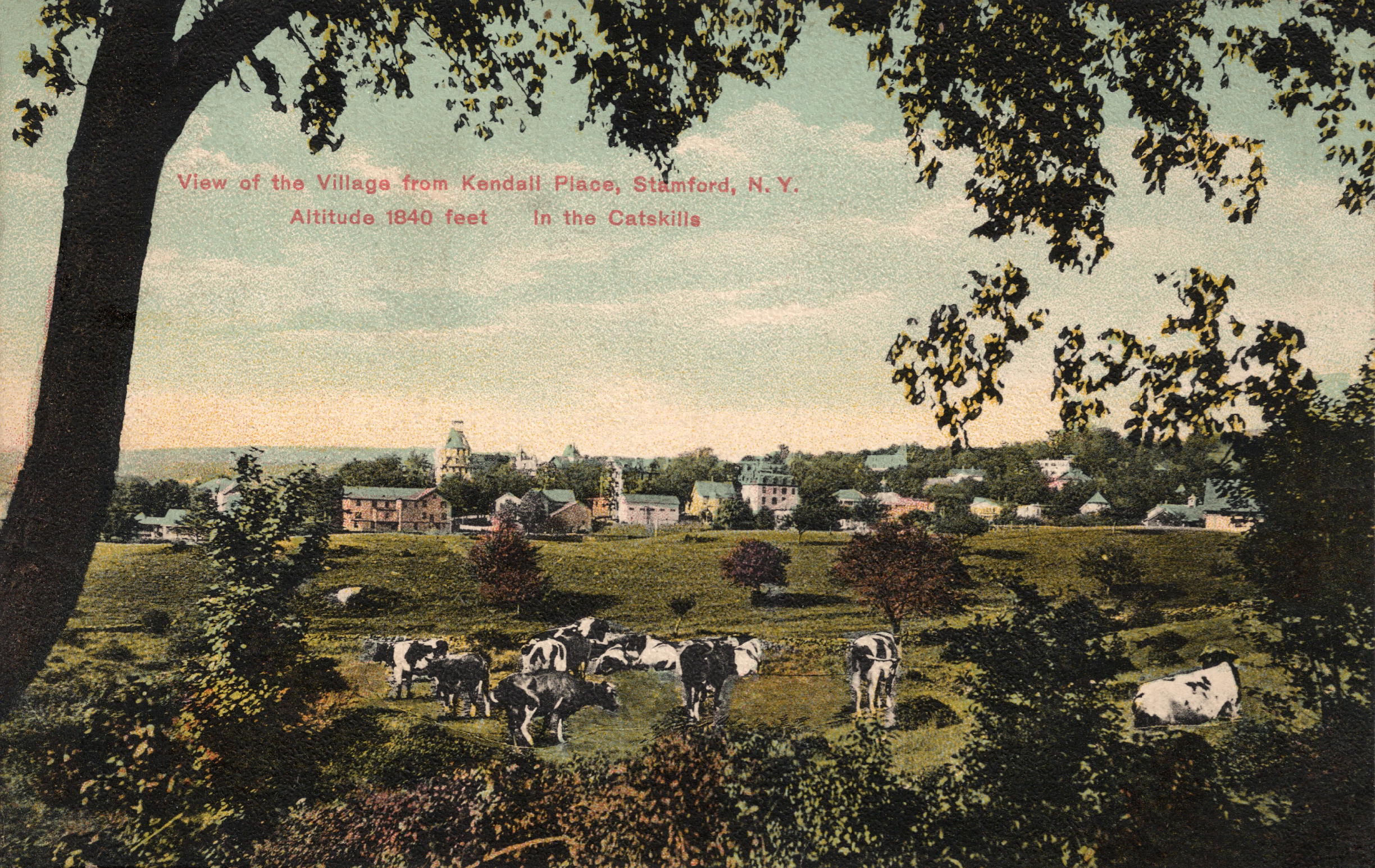
- Stamford, NY, circa 1911

- Location within New York
- Coordinates: 42°21′38″N 74°37′58″W
- Country: United States
- State: New York
- County: Delaware

Government
  - Type: Town Council
  - Town Supervisor: Michael Triolo (R)
  - Town Council: Members' List: • Bette Jayne Spinney (R); • Rudy Stripp (R); • Daniel Deysenroth (R); • Christopher Gaddis (R)

Area
  - Total: 48.61 sq mi (125.90 km^{2})
  - Land: 48.51 sq mi (125.63 km^{2})
  - Water: 0.10 sq mi (0.27 km^{2})
- Elevation: 1,700 ft (520 m)

Population (2020)
  - Total: 2,000
  - Density: 41/sq mi (16/km^{2})
- Time zone: Eastern (EST)
- ZIP Codes: 12167 (Stamford); 13788 (Hobart; 13739 (Bloomville); 13842 (South Kortright)
- Area code: 607
- FIPS code: 36-025-70629
- GNIS feature ID: 979518
- Website: townofstamfordny.us

Stamford is a town in Delaware County, New York, United States. The population was 2,000 at the 2020 census. The town is in the eastern part of the county and has a village called Stamford.

== Geography ==
The northeastern town line is the border of Schoharie County. The town was organized in Ulster County in 1792 and transferred to newly organized Delaware County from Ulster County in 1797. Area was taken to organize all of Roxbury town in 1799 and part of Bovina town in 1820. The town gained area north of Hobart village from Harpersfield and Kortright towns in 1834 to arrive at its current boundaries.

According to the United States Census Bureau, the town has a total area of 48.6 square miles (125.9 km^{2}), of which 48.5 square miles (125.6 km^{2}) is land and 0.1 square miles (0.3 km^{2}), or 0.22%, is water. The town lies along the upper reaches of the West Branch Delaware River, which forms the town's northern border.

== Demographics ==
Historical population
Census	Pop.	Note	%±
1820	1,495		—
1830	1,597		6.8%
1840	1,681		5.3%
1850	1,708		1.6%
1860	1,661		−2.8%
1870	1,658		−0.2%
1880	1,638		−1.2%
1890	1,940		18.4%
1900	1,997		2.9%
1910	2,113		5.8%
1920	2,104		−0.4%
1930	2,141		1.8%
1940	1,993		−6.9%
1950	2,121		6.4%
1960	2,103		−0.8%
1970	2,072		−1.5%
1980	2,038		−1.6%
1990	2,047		0.4%
2000	1,943		−5.1%
2010	2,267		16.7%
2020	2,000		−11.8%
U.S. Decennial Census 2020

At the 2000 census there were 1,943 people, 794 households, and 521 families in the town. The population density was 40.1 inhabitants per square mile (15.5/km^{2}). There were 1,201 housing units at an average density of 24.8 per square mile (9.6/km^{2}). The racial makeup of the town was 96.55% White, 1.03% Black or African American, 0.21% Native American, 0.46% Asian, 0.10% from other races, and 1.65% from two or more races. Hispanic or Latino of any race were 1.90%.

Of the 794 households 29.8% had children under the age of 18 living with them, 52.0% were married couples living together, 9.9% had a female householder with no husband present, and 34.3% were non-families. 27.2% of households were one person and 13.1% were one person aged 65 or older. The average household size was 2.37 and the average family size was 2.89.

The age distribution was 23.9% under the age of 18, 5.2% from 18 to 24, 26.5% from 25 to 44, 27.2% from 45 to 64, and 17.2% 65 or older. The median age was 41 years. For every 100 females, there were 94.7 males. For every 100 females age 18 and over, there were 92.8 males.

The median household income was $34,148 and the median family income was $42,941. Males had a median income of $27,188 versus $20,602 for females. The per capita income for the town was $17,546. About 9.5% of families and 12.0% of the population were below the poverty line, including 17.1% of those under age 18 and 11.2% of those age 65 or over.

== Communities and locations in the town of Stamford ==
- Hobart – The village of Hobart.
- South Kortright – A hamlet on CR 18.
- Stamford – The village of Stamford.

== Attractions ==
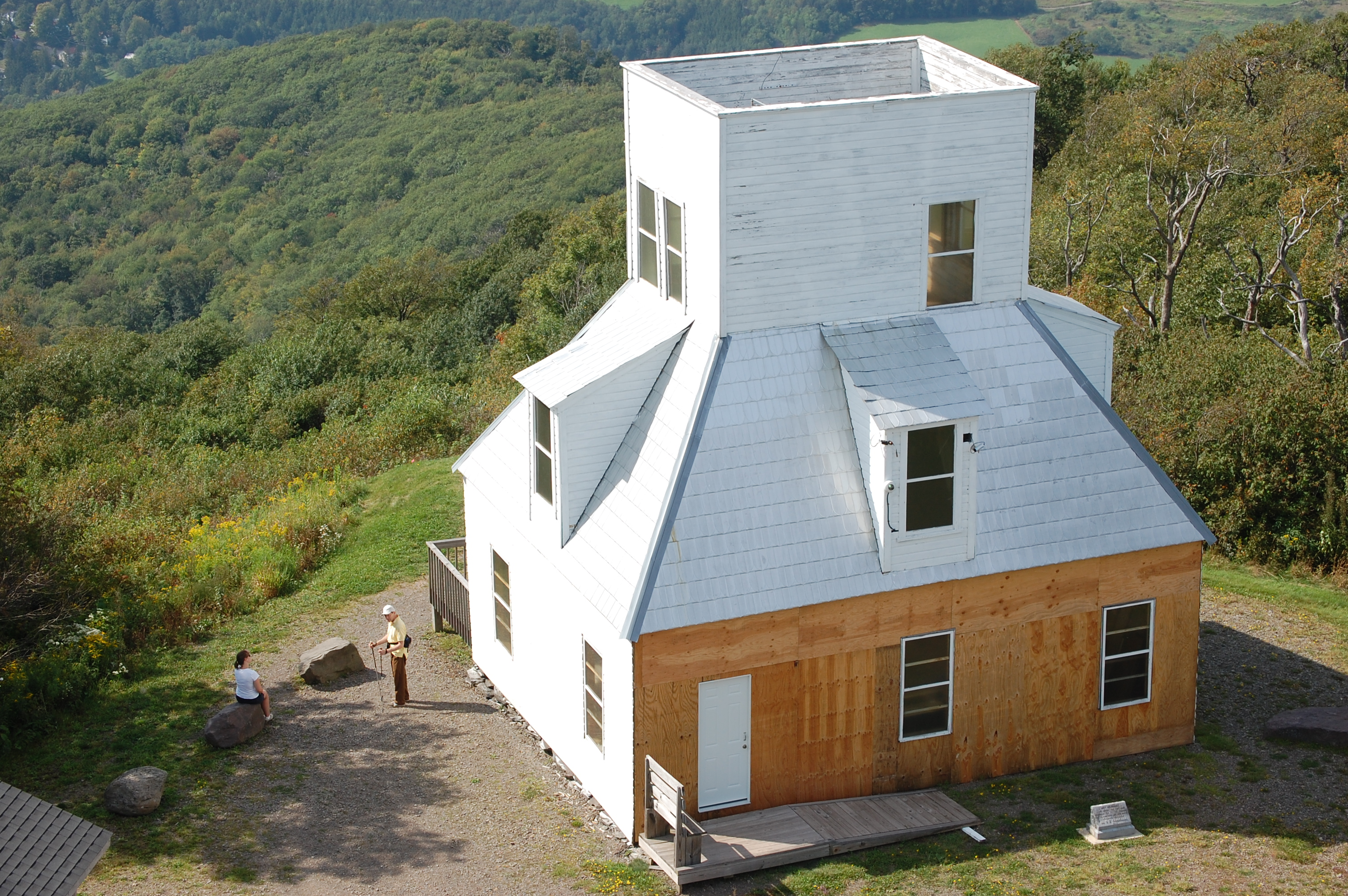
Observatory atop Mount Utsayantha overlooking Stamford

3,214-foot (980 m) Mount Utsayantha is located within Stamford, which includes an observatory and a viewing tower. It is a popular destination for hang-gliding enthusiasts.

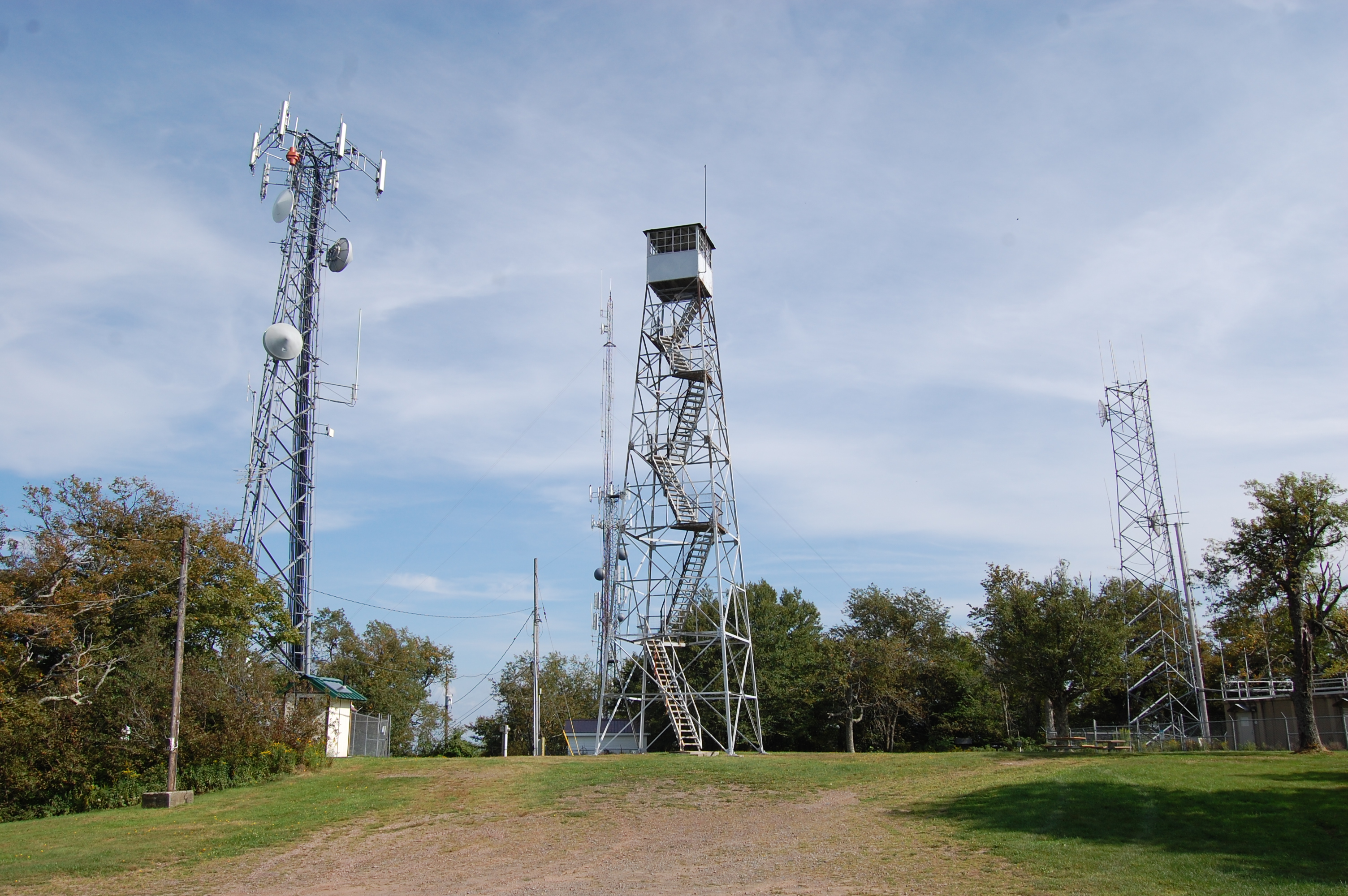
A fire lookout tower on Mount Utsayantha
