= Treadwell, New York =

- Hamlet
- Location within New York Location within the United States
- Coordinates: 42°20′32″N 75°03′05″W
- Country: United States
- State: New York
- County: Delaware
- Elevation: 1,529 ft (466 m)
- Time zone: UTC-5 (Eastern (EST))
  - Summer (DST): UTC-4 (EDT)
- ZIP code: 13846
- Area code: 607
- GNIS feature ID: 967774

Treadwell is a hamlet located within the town of Franklin in Delaware County, New York, United States. Treadwell was originally named Croton in the 19th century. Treadwell is located near Oneonta. Its ZIP code is 13846.
