= Episcopal Church of St. John the Evangelist, San Francisco =

Church in San Francisco, California, US

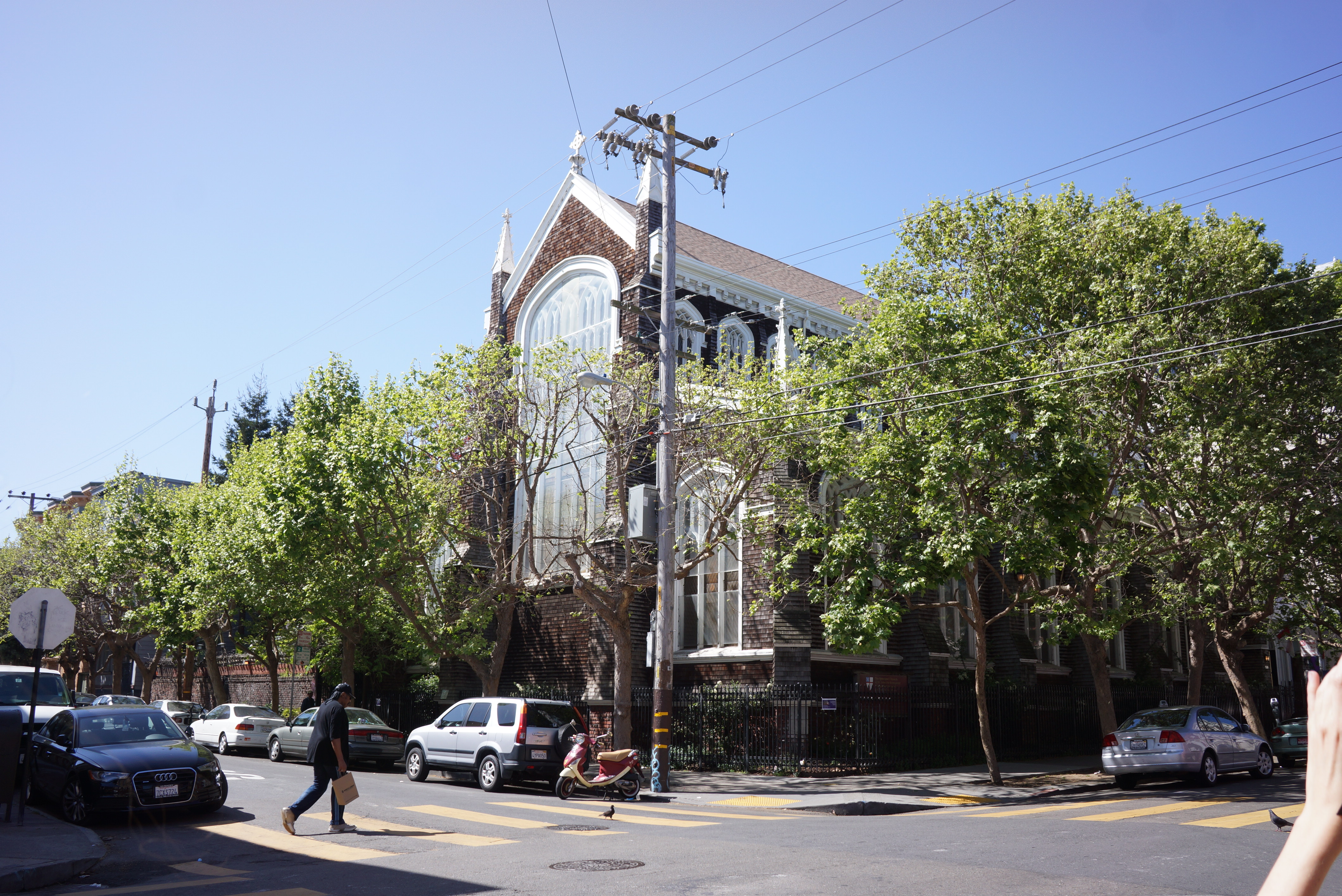
- Episcopal Church of St. John the Evangelist in 2015
- Episcopal Church of St. John the Evangelist, San Francisco
- Location: 1661-15th Street, San Francisco, California
- Country: United States
- Religious institute: Episcopal Church
- Website: saintjohnsf.org

History
- Founded: 1857; 169 years ago

The Episcopal Church of St. John the Evangelist, San Francisco, is the third oldest church in the Episcopal Diocese of California. Founded during the Gold Rush era in 1857, the church is located at 1661-15th Street in the Mission District of San Francisco, California, U.S..

The church reported 101 members in 2017 and 80 members in 2023; no membership statistics were reported in 2024 parochial reports. Plate and pledge income reported for the congregation in 2024 was $159,929 with average Sunday attendance (ASA) of 38 persons.

== History ==
The Episcopal Church of St. John the Evangelist was founded during the Gold Rush era in 1857. In the 1880s, the church's third Rector was involved in founding the Mission District's St. Luke's Hospital, at the time the only San-Francisco medical institution to treat the Chinese community.

In the 1890s, the church erected a granite neo-Byzantine basilica, which was dynamited in 1906 to form a firebreak during the great San Francisco earthquake and fire. The current building dates to 1909, and is in the architectural style known as "Tudor Lantern."

In the late 1960s the church and its rectory and performance space became a hub of counterculture activity under the leadership of Rev. Albert O. Lott, hosting progressive theatre by the Pitschel Players, the "Wednesday Night Fights" in which the vestry engaged with the community on topics of contemporary interest, and various public events, including the wedding of Country Joe McDonald, which was featured on the cover of the 1968 Together album by Country Joe and the Fish. There was also an outpouring of musical creativity, notably original works written and produced by the then-choirmaster Jeff Davis, the carillonist for the Berkeley, California carillon.

In the 1970s, in reaction to the continuing deterioration of the neighborhood around the church caused by the erection of 1950's housing projects, rector Winston Ching founded St. John's Educational Thresholds Center, a tutoring program for mission youth.

In the 1970s and 1980s, the church's proximity to the neighborhood of Castro allowed it to attract a large gay membership. Since that time, the church has been an advocate for Lesbian, gay, bisexual, and transgender rights in the larger Anglican church.

In 2007, the church celebrated its 150th anniversary. In March 2024, a suspected arson closed the church on Good Friday.
