= Delaware County Courthouse Square District =

Historic district in New York, United States

- U.S. National Register of Historic Places
- U.S. Historic district
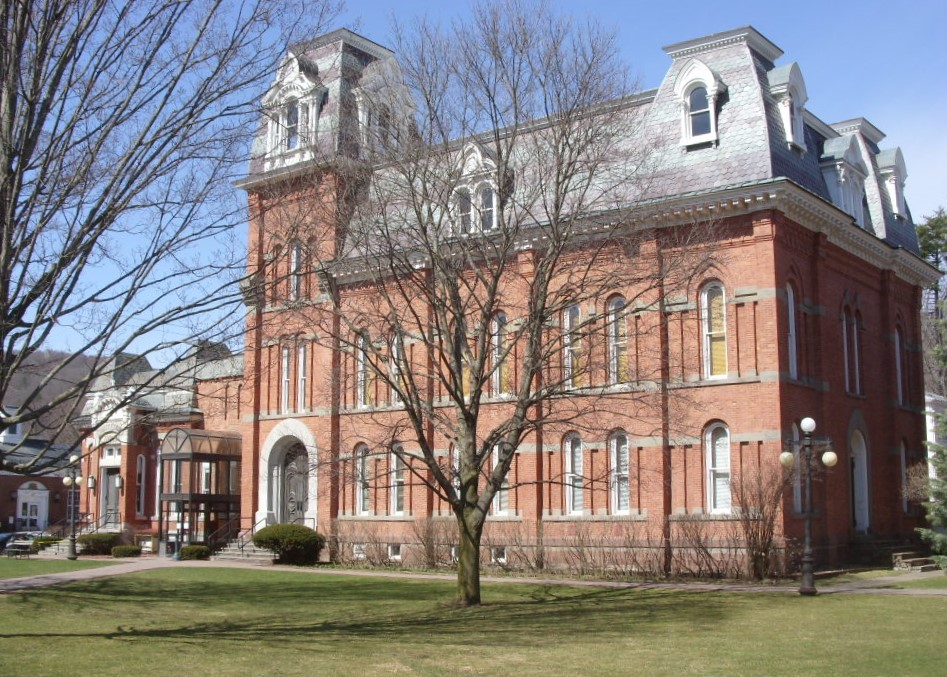
- Delaware County Courthouse and Clerk's Office, April 2009

- Location within New York Location within the United States
- Interactive map showing the location of Delaware County Courthouse Square District
- Location: Roughly bounded by 2nd, Church, Main, and Court Sts., Delhi, New York
- Coordinates: 42°16′42″N 74°55′1″W
- Area: 8 acres (3.2 ha)
- Built: 1831
- Architects: Perry, Isaac G.; Hathaway, Charles
- NRHP reference No.: 73001177
- Added to NRHP: July 16, 1973

Delaware County Courthouse Square District is a national historic district located at Delhi in Delaware County, New York. The district contains 18 contributing buildings and one contributing structure. It consists of a distinctive and unspoiled grouping of 19th century governmental, commercial, and religious structures built around the village green. It includes the county courthouse and clerk's office, the local New York State Department of Motor Vehicles, several county department offices, and a bandstand. It also includes the buildings surrounding the green. The 2 1/2-story brick courthouse building was designed by Isaac G. Perry and features a mansard roof. Also within the district are the Presbyterian church (1831) and a Bank building (1838).

It was listed on the National Register of Historic Places in 1973.

== See also ==
- National Register of Historic Places listings in Delaware County, New York
