= Hobart, New York =

- Village
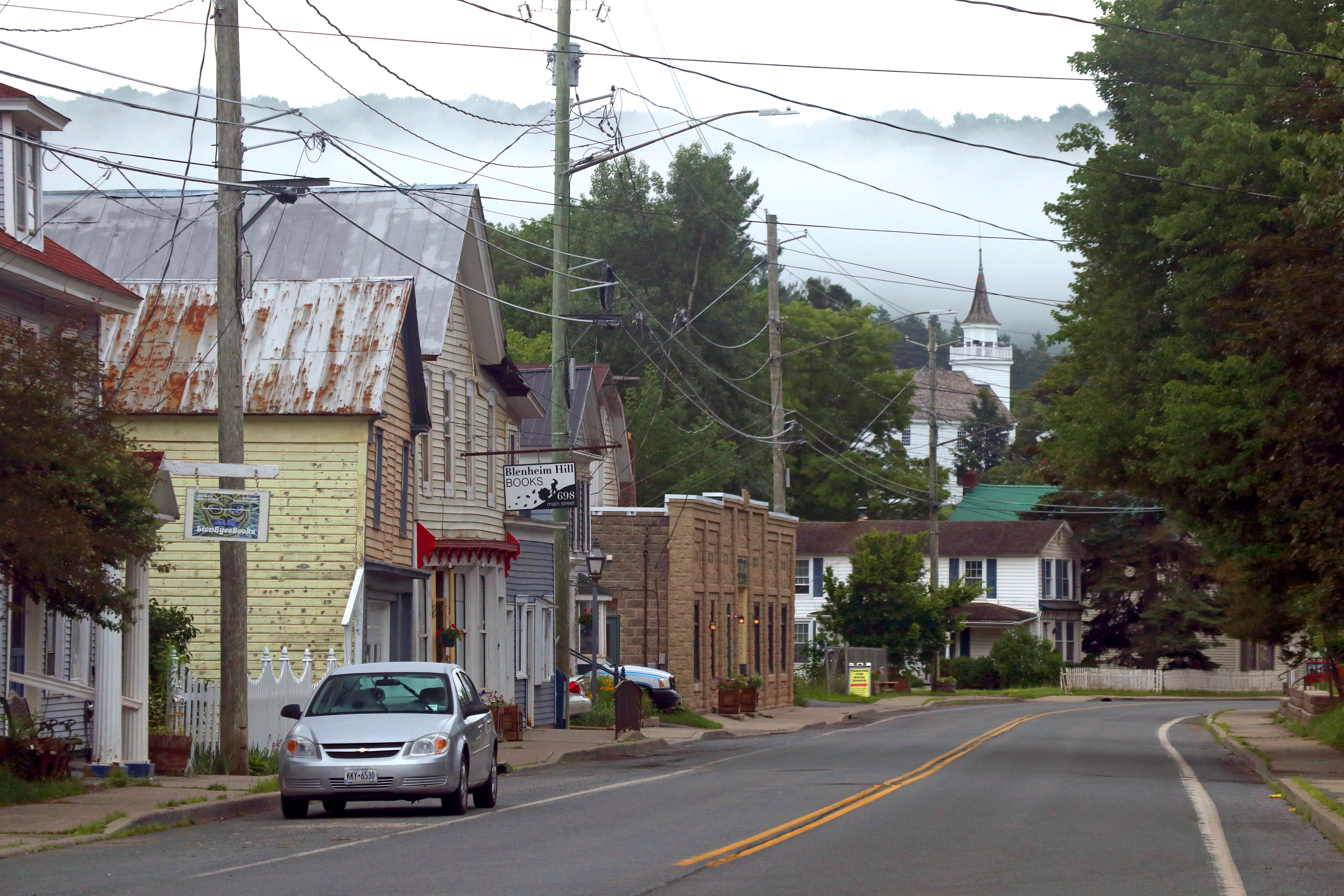
- Motto(s): "Jewel of the West Branch," "Book Village of the Catskills"
- Interactive map of Hobart, New York
- Location of Hobart in New York state
- Coordinates: 42°22′17″N 74°40′7″W
- Country: United States
- State: New York
- County: Delaware
- Town: Stamford

Area
  - Total: 0.51 sq mi (1.31 km^{2})
  - Land: 0.50 sq mi (1.29 km^{2})
  - Water: 0.0077 sq mi (0.02 km^{2})
- Elevation: 1,650 ft (503 m)

Population (2020)
  - Total: 351
  - Density: 705.0/sq mi (272.21/km^{2})
- Time zone: UTC-5 (Eastern (EST))
  - Summer (DST): UTC-4 (EDT)
- ZIP Code: 13788
- Area code: 607
- FIPS code: 36-34979
- GNIS feature ID: 0952909
- Website: www.hobartny.us

Hobart is a village in Delaware County, New York, United States. As of the 2020 census, Hobart had a population of 351. The village is in the town of Stamford and is on New York Route 10 in the northeastern part of the county.

Since 2005, Hobart has had multiple book stores and has become known as the "Book Village of the Catskills."

== History ==
=== 18th century ===
Prior to 1763, Hobart and its surrounding region were used as hunting grounds by indigenous peoples of the Northeastern Woodlands, specifically the Lenape and Mohawk people.

In the aftermath of the American Revolution, European-descended settlers moved to the present-day village around 1784, building farms, mills, and inns. Many of these settlers came from Connecticut and New England to seek cheaper farmland. This early group was largely Episcopalian, and constructed the village's first church in 1801, placing it so that it was at the center of the village.

The village was initially known most commonly as Waterville.

=== 19th century ===
In 1828, the United States Postal Service requested that the village rename to avoid confusion with the more populated village of Waterville, New York. The name Hobart was selected to honor John Henry Hobart, then the Bishop of the Episcopal Diocese of New York.

Hobart grew in population through the 1800s. By the turn of the century, it was home to a variety of local industry, largely centered around agriculture. A railroad line first connected to the village in 1884 and helped support local agricultural businesses. Some of the most prominent were Sheffield Farms, which operated a local plant from 1888 to 1968, and the E.T. Van Buren lumber and hardware business, which operated from 1906 until 1965. The presence of the railroad helped create and maintain an active tourist trade in Hobart and the surrounding Catskills in the 1920s.

=== 20th century ===
Along with its surrounding region, Hobart saw a decline in business and population during the second half of the 20th century. In 1965, the E.T. Van Buren business burned down and never recovered, and slowly a large number of small businesses closed down as revenues declined and owners retired.

Dean M. Graham established a pharmaceutical company in the village in 1966, and over the next few decades it grew into a successful business, providing employment for local residents and summer jobs for area students interested in the sciences. After "Doc" Graham sold the company in 1996, the company's factory was significantly expanded and is currently owned by Mallinckrodt.

=== 21st century ===
In 2001, William Adams and his wife Diana were traveling near Hobart on vacation and decided to rent a building in the village for a future book business, opening Hobart's first book store the following June. A few years later, Don Dales, a local resident who owned several buildings in the village, helped spur local support for emulating the model of Hay-on-Wye and making Hobart into a book village. Since 2005 the village has been home to around six bookstores and has experienced a resurgence of tourism from book shoppers.

In 2014, Bollinger Motors was founded in Hobart and produced its initial B1 prototype in a garage on the western side of the village. In 2018, the company relocated to Detroit, Michigan.

== Historic sites ==
The Hobart Masonic Hall and the St. Peter's Episcopal Church Complex are listed on the National Register of Historic Places.

== Geography ==
Hobart is located in the north-central part of the town of Stamford at 42°22′17″N 74°40′7″W (42.371251, -74.668481), along the upper reaches of the West Branch Delaware River.

According to the United States Census Bureau, the village has a total area of 0.50 square miles (1.3 km^{2}), of which 0.01 square miles (0.02 km^{2}), or 1.38%, is water.

== Demographics ==
Historical population
Census	Pop.	Note	%±
1880	390		—
1890	561		43.8%
1900	550		−2.0%
1910	544		−1.1%
1920	587		7.9%
1930	580		−1.2%
1940	638		10.0%
1950	618		−3.1%
1960	585		−5.3%
1970	531		−9.2%
1980	473		−10.9%
1990	385		−18.6%
2000	390		1.3%
2010	441		13.1%
2020	351		−20.4%
U.S. Decennial Census

As of the census of 2000, there were 390 people, 151 households, and 104 families residing in the village. The population density was 763.8 inhabitants per square mile (294.9/km^{2}). There were 200 housing units at an average density of 391.7 per square mile (151.2/km^{2}). The racial makeup of the village was 94.36% White, 3.85% African American, 0.77% Native American, 0.51% Asian, and 0.51% from two or more races. Hispanic or Latino of any race were 0.51% of the population.

There were 151 households, out of which 32.5% had children under the age of 18 living with them, 53.6% were married couples living together, 13.9% had a female householder with no husband present, and 30.5% were non-families. 21.9% of all households were made up of individuals, and 13.2% had someone living alone who was 65 years of age or older. The average household size was 2.41 and the average family size was 2.78.

In the village, the population was spread out, with 22.8% under the age of 18, 6.4% from 18 to 24, 25.4% from 25 to 44, 25.4% from 45 to 64, and 20.0% who were 65 years of age or older. The median age was 41 years. For every 100 females, there were 90.2 males. For every 100 females age 18 and over, there were 87.0 males.

The median income for a household in the village was $39,375, and the median income for a family was $42,500. Males had a median income of $25,893 versus $20,313 for females. The per capita income for the village was $16,281. About 17.0% of families and 17.6% of the population were below the poverty line, including 25.6% of those under age 18 and 10.7% of those age 65 or over.

== Notable people ==
- James Hamilton Ballagh, missionary who played a prominent role in introducing Protestant Christianity to Japan.
- Cheryl Clarke, American lesbian poet, essayist, educator and Black feminist community activist
- Hector Cowan, American college football player and coach, member of first College Football All-America Team in 1889
- James R. Cowan, farmer, banker, and member of New York State Assembly
- Jay Gould, railroad magnate, attended school in Hobart during the 1850s.
- Scott Jensen, Silver Reuben Award winning cartoonist.
- Edwyn E. Mason, member of New York State Assembly from 1952 to 1972 and New York State Senate from 1972 to 1978
- Olive B. O'Connor, founder of the A. Lindsay and Olive B. O'Connor Foundation.
- Orrin Peck, American painter.
- Helen P. Sanborn, suffragist, educator, civic worker, and clubwoman.
- Frank Sandford, early 20th century cult leader convicted of manslaughter.
- Eleanor Clarke Slagle, social worker considered to be "the mother of occupational therapy"
