= Cortland Cart & Carriage Company =

Historical American carriage and automotive manufacturer

Coordinates: 42.2954°N 75.4139°W

Cortland Cart and Carriage Company
- Industry: Automotive
- Founded: Early 1880s
- Founder: Hjalmar Malmberg
- Defunct: 1924; 102 years ago
- Fate: Bankrupt
- Headquarters: Cortland, New York (later Sidney, New York), United States
- Area served: United States
- Key people: Louis I. Hatfield; Winfield T. Sherwood
- Products: Carriages, automobiles

The Cortland Cart and Carriage Company was an American carriage and automobile manufacturer. Its 1917 Hatfield Model I Suburban was the first regular production station wagon by an American company.

The company was founded in Cortland, New York during the early 1880s by Hjalmar Malmberg, a Swedish immigrant and carriage builder, and Frank Alton Begent, a successful lumber and coal dealer with Begent and Crittenden of Groton, New York. Malmberg served as president of the company with Begent as vice-president and Louis I. Hatfield as general manager.

In March 1895 the factory was destroyed by a fire with losses reported to be in excess of $75,000. In July 1895 the company relocated to Sidney, New York. By the early 1910s Louis I. Hatfield had succeeded Malmberg as president with Winfield T. Sherwood becoming vice-president.

Cortland Cart and Carriage Company (now renamed to Hatfield Motor Company) was declared bankrupt in May 1924 and entered receivership the following month.

Shortly before his death in September 1924, Winfield T. Sherwood made arrangements to sell the Cart and Carriage factory to Scintilla Magneto Company. The sale (for $51,000) took place in December 1924, Scintilla began using the site in early 1925. Scintilla was purchased in 1929 by Bendix Corporation, who produced magnetos in the former Cart and Carriage works site until the end of World War II.

== Bibliography ==
- Kimes, Beverly Rae; Clark, Henry Austin Jr. (1989). Standard catalog of American Cars. 1805–1942. Iola: Krause Publications. pp. 652–653. ISBN 0-87341-111-0.
- Georgano, George Nicholas (2001). The Beaulieu Encyclopedia of the Automobile. Vol. 2. Chicago: Fitzroy Dearborn Publishers. pp. 674–675. ISBN 1-57958-293-1.

== See also ==
- List of defunct automobile manufacturers
