= Masonville, New York =

- Town
- Location within the state of New York
- Coordinates: 42°13′50″N 75°20′20″W
- Country: United States
- State: New York
- County: Delaware

Government
  - Type: Town Council
  - Town Supervisor: Michael Spaccaforno (R)
  - Town Council: Members' List: • Jrei Brayman (R); • Craig Dumpond(R); • Steve Roff (c); • Betty Scott (R)

Area
  - Total: 54.44 sq mi (141.01 km^{2})
  - Land: 54.27 sq mi (140.55 km^{2})
  - Water: 0.18 sq mi (0.46 km^{2})
- Elevation: 1,490 ft (454 m)

Population (2020)
  - Total: 1,239
- Time zone: UTC-5 (Eastern (EST))
  - Summer (DST): UTC-4 (EDT)
- ZIP Codes: 13804 (Masonville); 13838 (Sidney); 13839 (Sidney Center); 13849 (Unadilla); 13733 (Bainbridge)
- Area code: 607
- FIPS code: 36-025-45964
- GNIS feature ID: 0979204
- Website: www.masonville-ny.us

Masonville is a town in Delaware County, New York, United States. The population was 1,239 at the 2020 census. The town is in the western part of the county.

== History ==
The town was formed in 1811 from the town of Sidney. It was named for the Rev. John M. Mason, a landholder.

== Geography ==
The western town line is the border of Chenango County.

According to the United States Census Bureau, the town has a total area of 54.4 square miles (141.0 km^{2}), of which 54.2 square miles (140.5 km^{2}) is land and 0.2 square miles (0.5 km^{2}), or 0.33%, is water. Most of the town drains west via Masonville Creek to the Susquehanna River near Bainbridge, but the southern edge of the town and the eastern tip drain south via several tributaries to the West Branch Delaware River.

== Demographics ==
Historical population
Census	Pop.	Note	%±
1820	719		—
1830	1,145		59.2%
1840	1,420		24.0%
1850	1,550		9.2%
1860	1,684		8.6%
1870	1,738		3.2%
1880	1,673		−3.7%
1890	1,397		−16.5%
1900	1,245		−10.9%
1910	1,053		−15.4%
1920	878		−16.6%
1930	854		−2.7%
1940	931		9.0%
1950	1,010		8.5%
1960	1,030		2.0%
1970	1,140		10.7%
1980	1,156		1.4%
1990	1,352		17.0%
2000	1,405		3.9%
2010	1,320		−6.0%
2020	1,239		−6.1%
U.S. Decennial Census

As of the census of 2000, there were 1,405 people, 525 households, and 399 families residing in the town. The population density was 25.9 inhabitants per square mile (10.0/km^{2}). There were 713 housing units at an average density of 13.2 per square mile (5.1/km^{2}). The racial makeup of the town was 95.30% White, 2.35% African American, 0.21% Asian, 0.50% from other races, and 1.64% from two or more races. Hispanic or Latino of any race were 1.71% of the population.

There were 525 households, out of which 33.3% had children under the age of 18 living with them, 63.0% were married couples living together, 7.6% had a female householder with no husband present, and 24.0% were non-families. 19.6% of all households were made up of individuals, and 8.2% had someone living alone who was 65 years of age or older. The average household size was 2.63 and the average family size was 2.99.

In the town, the population was spread out, with 28.2% under the age of 18, 5.0% from 18 to 24, 25.3% from 25 to 44, 27.9% from 45 to 64, and 13.6% who were 65 years of age or older. The median age was 38 years. For every 100 females, there were 115.5 males. For every 100 females age 18 and over, there were 108.0 males.

The median income for a household in the town was $33,000, and the median income for a family was $36,406. Males had a median income of $27,976 versus $21,767 for females. The per capita income for the town was $14,933. About 10.6% of families and 14.4% of the population were below the poverty line, including 18.4% of those under age 18 and 10.1% of those age 65 or over.

== Communities and locations in Masonville ==
- Arctic –
- East Masonville –
- Ivanhoe –
- Masonville –
- Oquaga Creek State Park –
- Whitman --
- Youngs Station --
