= Delhi (village), New York =

Delhi, New York
- Village
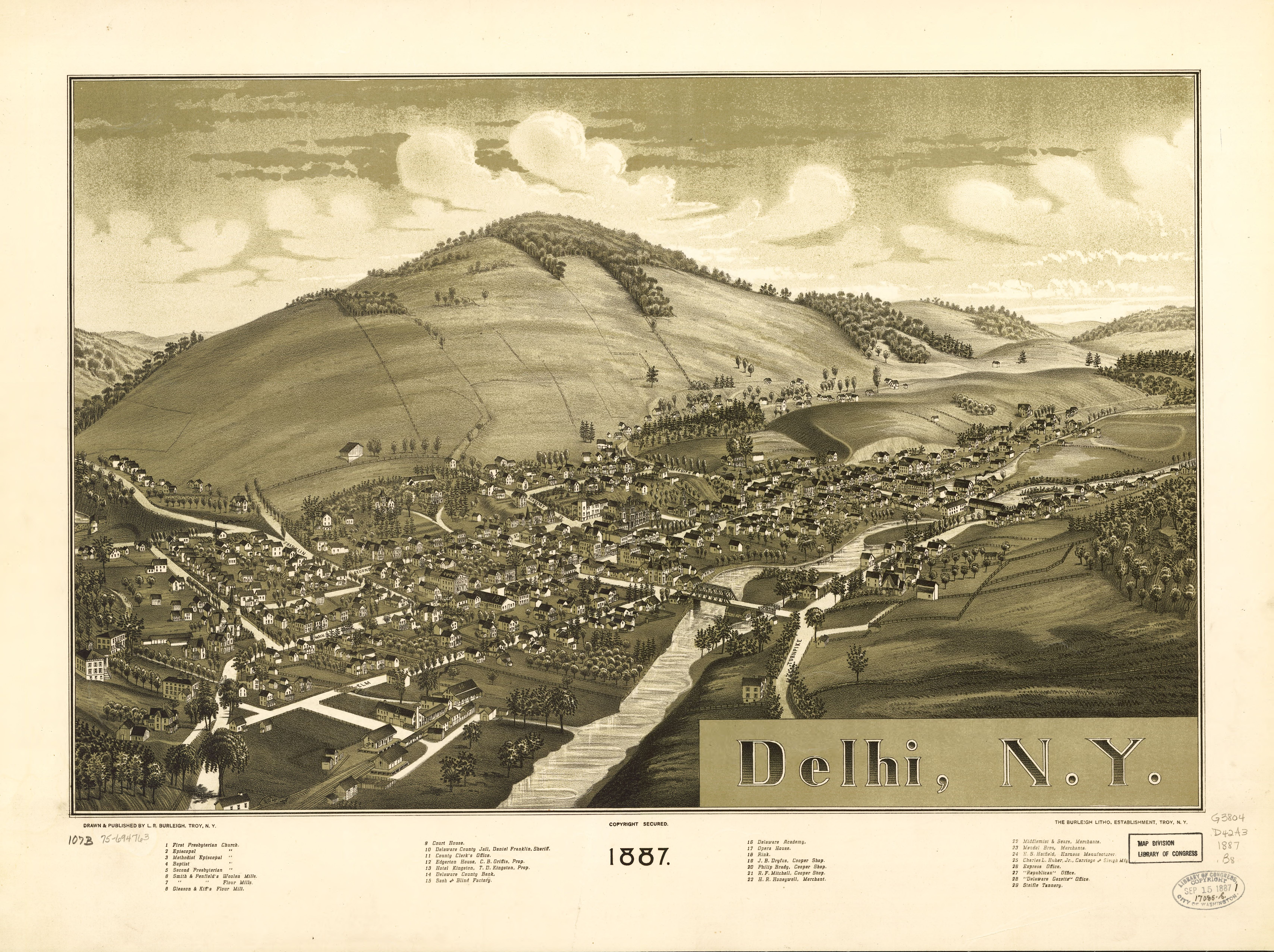

- Seal

- Location within the state of New York
- Coordinates: 42°16′44″N 74°54′59″W
- Country: United States
- State: New York
- County: Delaware
- Town: Delhi
- Named for: Delhi, India

Area
  - Total: 3.23 sq mi (8.36 km^{2})
  - Land: 3.18 sq mi (8.23 km^{2})
  - Water: 0.050 sq mi (0.13 km^{2})
- Elevation: 1,371 ft (418 m)

Population (2020)
  - Total: 2,721
  - Density: 856.7/sq mi (330.79/km^{2})
- Time zone: UTC-5 (Eastern (EST))
  - Summer (DST): UTC-4 (EDT)
- ZIP code: 13753
- Area code: 607
- FIPS code: 36-20126
- GNIS feature ID: 0948275
- Website: villageofdelhiny.gov

Delhi (/ˈdɛl.haɪ/ DEL-hy) is a village in and the county seat of Delaware County, New York, United States. Its population was 3,087 at the 2010 census.

Delhi village is within the town of Delhi on Routes 10 and 28.

The State University of New York at Delhi, partially within the village limits, is located southwest of the town hall.

== History ==
Delhi was formally incorporated as a village in 1821.

The Delaware County Courthouse Square District, First Presbyterian Church, St. John's Church Complex, and United States Post Office are listed on the National Register of Historic Places.

== Geography ==
Delhi is located in the center of the town of Delhi at 42°16′44″N 74°54′59″W (42.278926, -74.916408), northeast of the geographic center of Delaware County. New York State Route 10 passes through the village as it follows the valley of the West Branch Delaware River, leading northeast 20 miles (32 km) to Stamford and southwest 16 miles (26 km) to Walton. NY 28 also passes through the village, leading northwest 20 miles (32 km) to Oneonta and southeast 69 miles (111 km) to Kingston.

According to the United States Census Bureau, the village has a total area of 3.2 square miles (8.3 km^{2}), of which 0.04 square miles (0.1 km^{2}), or 1.20%, is water. The West Branch Delaware River flows through the village from northeast to southwest.

== Demographics ==
Historical population
Census	Pop.	Note	%±
1860	1,201		—
1870	1,223		1.8%
1880	1,384		13.2%
1890	1,564		13.0%
1900	2,078		32.9%
1910	1,736		−16.5%
1920	1,669		−3.9%
1930	1,840		10.2%
1940	1,841		0.1%
1950	2,223		20.7%
1960	2,307		3.8%
1970	3,017		30.8%
1980	3,374		11.8%
1990	3,064		−9.2%
2000	2,583		−15.7%
2010	3,087		19.5%
2020	2,721		−11.9%
U.S. Decennial Census

As of the census of 2000, there were 2,583 people, 714 households, and 404 families residing in the village. The population density was 812.2 inhabitants per square mile (313.6/km^{2}). There were 818 housing units at an average density of 257.2 per square mile (99.3/km^{2}). The racial makeup of the village was 87.77% White, 6.97% Black or African American, 0.31% Native American, 1.82% Asian, 1.55% from other races, and 1.59% from two or more races. Hispanic or Latino of any race were 4.30% of the population.

There were 714 households, out of which 25.2% had children under the age of 18 living with them, 41.5% were married couples living together, 12.2% had a female householder with no husband present, and 43.3% were non-families. 34.0% of all households were made up of individuals, and 16.1% had someone living alone who was 65 years of age or older. The average household size was 2.20 and the average family size was 2.81.

In the village, the population was spread out, with 13.2% under the age of 18, 44.7% from 18 to 24, 14.8% from 25 to 44, 15.3% from 45 to 64, and 12.0% who were 65 years of age or older. The median age was 21 years. For every 100 females, there were 103.7 males. For every 100 females age 18 and over, there were 103.5 males.

The median income for a household in the village was $32,708, and the median income for a family was $42,692. Males had a median income of $27,109 versus $21,800 for females. The per capita income for the village was $13,421. About 8.1% of families and 14.1% of the population were below the poverty line, including 17.5% of those under age 18 and 7.1% of those age 65 or over.

== Education ==
- Delaware Academy (K-12)
- State University of New York at Delhi

== Cultural references ==
Delhi is the setting for the award-winning children's book My Side of the Mountain.

== Notable people ==
- Michael Herr, author
- Bill Pullman, studied and taught acting at SUNY Delhi
