= Sidney, New York =

- Town
- Location within New York Location within the United States
- Coordinates: 42.3149°N 75.3916°W
- Country: United States
- State: New York
- County: Delaware

Government
  - Type: Town Council
  - Town Supervisor: Sam McCarthy (R)
  - Town Council: Members' List: • Tobias Whitaker (D/I); • William Heath (D/I); • Eric Wilson (R); • C. Peter Cordes (D)

Area
  - Total: 50.60 sq mi (131.06 km^{2})
  - Land: 49.93 sq mi (129.32 km^{2})
  - Water: 0.68 sq mi (1.75 km^{2})
- Elevation: 1,290 ft (390 m)

Population (2020)
  - Total: 5,536
- Time zone: Eastern (EST)
- ZIP Codes: 13838 (Sidney); 13839 (Sidney Center); 13849 (Unadilla); 13825 (Otego); 13775 (Franklin); 13856 (Walton)
- Area code: 607
- FIPS code: 36-025-67345
- GNIS feature ID: 979495
- Website: Town website

Sidney is a town in Delaware County, New York, United States. The population was 5,536 at the 2020 census. The town is at the northwestern corner of the county and contains the village of Sidney.

== History ==
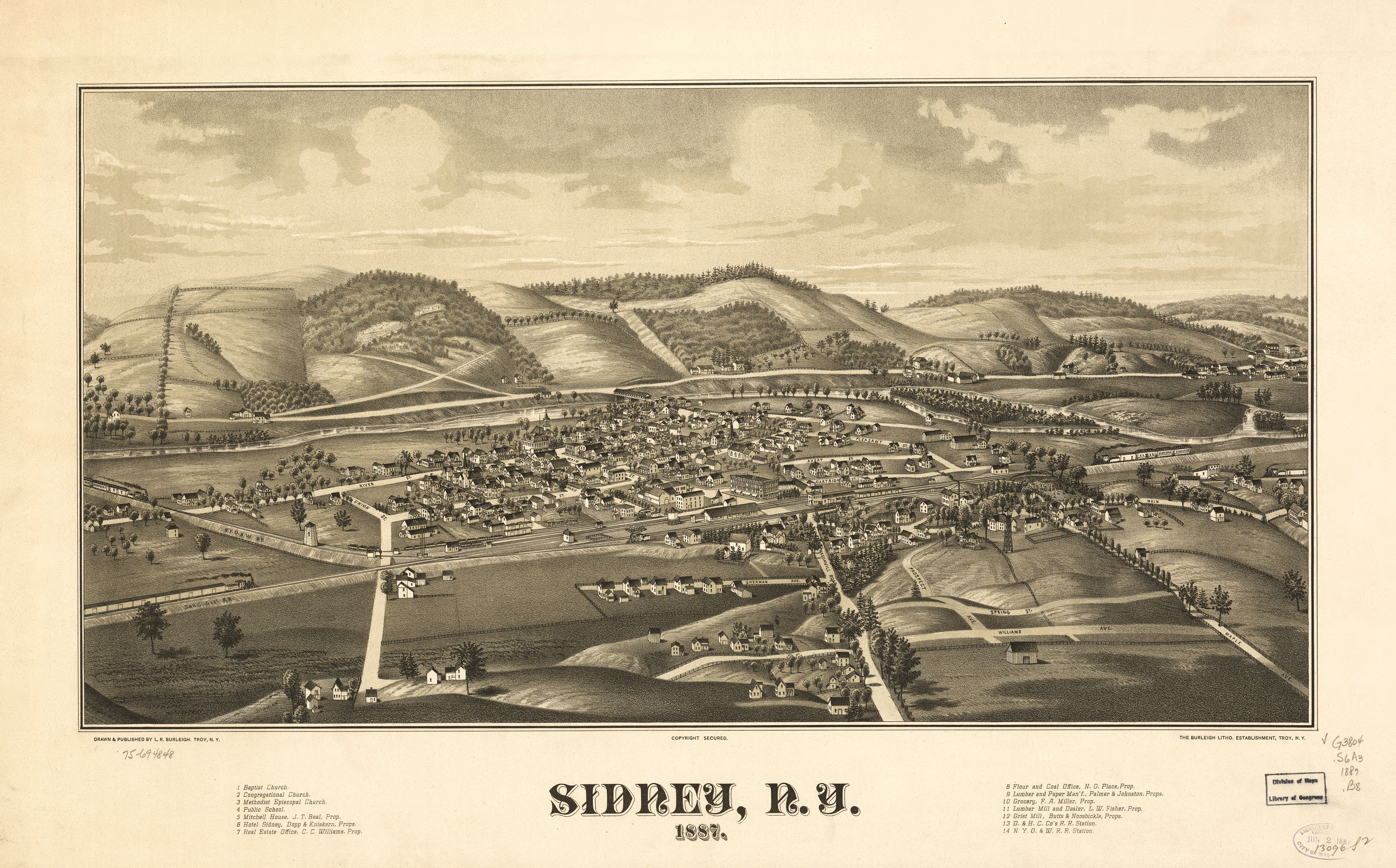
Perspective map of Sidney from 1887 by L.R. Burleigh with list of landmarks

The town was formed in 1801 from the town of Franklin. On April 7, 1801, the town was named "Sidney" in honor of British naval officer Sir Sidney Smith.

== Geography ==
The northern town line, marked by the Susquehanna River, is the border of Otsego County, and the western town boundary is the border of Chenango County. The village of Sidney, the main settlement in the town, is at the western end of the town along the Susquehanna River. Interstate 88 runs through the northern side of the town, with access from Exits 9, 10, and 11.

According to the United States Census Bureau, the town has a total area of 50.6 square miles (131.1 km^{2}), of which 49.9 square miles (129.3 km^{2}) is land and 0.66 square miles (1.7 km^{2}), or 1.33%, is water.

== Demographics ==
Historical population
Census	Pop.	Note	%±
1820	1,107		—
1830	1,410		27.4%
1840	1,732		22.8%
1850	1,807		4.3%
1860	1,916		6.0%
1870	2,597		35.5%
1880	2,461		−5.2%
1890	3,122		26.9%
1900	4,023		28.9%
1910	4,148		3.1%
1920	4,133		−0.4%
1930	3,854		−6.8%
1940	4,509		17.0%
1950	6,669		47.9%
1960	7,110		6.6%
1970	6,984		−1.8%
1980	6,856		−1.8%
1990	6,667		−2.8%
2000	6,109		−8.4%
2010	5,774		−5.5%
2020	5,536		−4.1%
U.S. Decennial Census

As of the census of 2000, there were 6,109 people, 2,565 households, and 1,641 families residing in the town. The population density was 121.5 inhabitants per square mile (46.9/km^{2}). There were 2,987 housing units at an average density of 59.4 per square mile (22.9/km^{2}). The racial makeup of the town was 96.35% White, 0.85% Black or African American, 0.33% Native American, 0.77% Asian, 0.03% Pacific Islander, 0.39% from other races, and 1.28% from two or more races. Hispanic or Latino of any race were 1.44% of the population.

There were 2,565 households, out of which 29.6% had children under the age of 18 living with them, 47.7% were married couples living together, 11.7% had a female householder with no husband present, and 36.0% were non-families. 30.3% of all households were made up of individuals, and 16.1% had someone living alone who was 65 years of age or older. The average household size was 2.35 and the average family size was 2.90.

In the town, the population was spread out, with 25.4% under the age of 18, 6.5% from 18 to 24, 25.3% from 25 to 44, 23.9% from 45 to 64, and 18.9% who were 65 years of age or older. The median age was 40 years. For every 100 females, there were 90.8 males. For every 100 females age 18 and over, there were 87.0 males.

The median income for a household in the town was $30,078, and the median income for a family was $35,351. Males had a median income of $28,168 versus $25,014 for females. The per capita income for the town was $16,335. About 11.1% of families and 14.3% of the population were below the poverty line, including 19.9% of those under age 18 and 10.3% of those age 65 or over.

== Communities and locations in the Town of Sidney ==
- East Sidney
- Franklin Depot
- Sidney – the Village of Sidney
- Sidney Center
- South Unadilla
- Youngs

== Notable people ==
- Mary Jane Aldrich (1833–1909), temperance reformer and lecturer.
- Evans Carlson (1896-1947), Marine Corps General, leader of "Carlson's Raiders."

== See also ==
- Cortland Cart & Carriage Company
- Scintilla Magneto Company
