= Roods Creek =

Location
- Country: United States
- State: New York

Physical characteristics
- Source
  - location: Delaware County, New York
  - coordinates: 42°03′41″N 75°21′37″W
- Mouth: West Branch Delaware River
  - location: Hale Eddy, New York, Delaware County, New York, United States
  - coordinates: 42°00′15″N 75°21′39″W
  - elevation: 951 ft (290 m)
- Basin size: 8.76 mi^{2} (22.7 km^{2})

Basin features
- Tributaries
  - right: Laurel Creek

Roods Creek is a river in Delaware County, New York. It begins just south of Cannonsville Reservoir and flows south into Crystal Lake. After exiting Crystal Lake it continues flowing south and then flows into Silver Lake. After exiting Silver Lake it continues southward before converging with the West Branch Delaware River east of the hamlet of Hale Eddy.
