= Ali Abdelaziz =

Egyptian mixed martial arts manager

Ali Ibrahim Abdelaziz
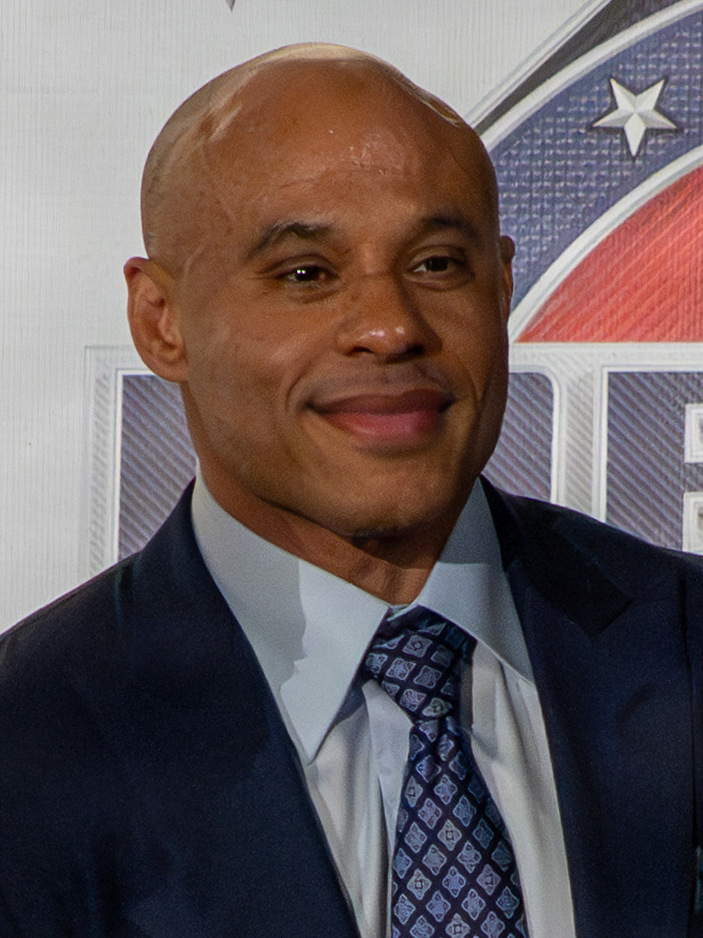
- Abdelaziz in 2026
- Born: Ali Ibrahim Abdelaziz; December 5, 1977 (age 48); Cairo, Egypt
- Height: 5 ft 9 in (1.75 m)
- Weight: 154 lb (70 kg; 11 st 0 lb)
- Division: Welterweight (2005–2007); Lightweight (2004)
- Style: Judo, Brazilian Jiu-Jitsu
- Years active: 2003–2007

Mixed martial arts record
- Total: 4
- Wins: 1
- By submission: 1
- Losses: 3
- By submission: 3

Ali Ibrahim Abdelaziz (Arabic: علي إبراهيم عبد العزيز) is an Egyptian-American mixed martial arts manager, having founded Dominance MMA Management. Abdelaziz is the former executive vice president and matchmaker for the World Series of Fighting promotion. He is also a former MMA fighter.

== Early life ==
Abdelaziz spent his youth growing up in Cairo playing soccer, later focusing on judo. He came to the United States for the first time in 1996 when he traveled to the Olympic Training Center in Colorado Springs.

== Career ==
Coming off of a loss in Japan, upon his return to Renzo Gracie's academy in New York where he trained, Gracie suggested Abdelaziz stop fighting and start managing fighters. In 2008, Abdelaziz founded Dominance MMA Management. Early on, he managed Gregor, Igor and Rolles Gracie, along with Rafael Natal and other fighters, many being taken on as clients for free. Eventually, Abdelaziz became a manager for Renzo Gracie.

Through Dominance MMA, Abdelaziz manages several former UFC champions, such as Khabib Nurmagomedov, Kamaru Usman, Justin Gaethje and Henry Cejudo, among others. He also manages the UFC's current women's bantamweight champion Kayla Harrison and former featherweight champion Lance Palmer. Of the 150 fighters on Dominance's roster, 80 were in the UFC as of June 2020.

=== World Series of Fighting ===
Abdelaziz was the executive vice president and matchmaker for the World Series of Fighting (WSOF, later acquired and reorganized into the Professional Fighters League, PFL). In December 2015, Abdelaziz left his position following a Nevada Athletic Commission (NAC) hearing in which "administrative and some operational concerns" were cited, relating to lawsuits and media reports regarding conflict of interest and potential violations of Nevada regulations against promotion officials also serving as a fighter’s manager. Standard 467.104 of the Code of Unarmed Combat of the Nevada State Athletic Commission prohibits "a promoter or any of its members, stockholders, officials, matchmakers or assistant matchmakers act directly or indirectly as his or her manager; or hold any financial interest in the unarmed combatant’s management or earnings from contests or exhibitions." Abdelaziz later made a statement about his conflict of interest, stating that he "never did mismatches" when matchmaking.

Despite a public announcement of his departure, it was alleged in a legal complaint filed against the promotion and its new owner, MMAX Investment Partners (doing business as PFL), that the organization "continued to use Abdelaziz throughout 2016".

=== Vitaly Minakov contract lawsuit ===
On January 16, 2019, Abdelaziz and former Bellator heavyweight champion Vitaly Minakov were sued by RusFighters LLC. The lawsuit claims Minakov breached an exclusive agent agreement with RusFighters signed in 2016 when he used Abdelaziz to sign a new contract. The agreement obligated Minakov to pay 20% of his gross performance compensation to RusFighters LLC. Using Abdelaziz, Minakov signed an agreement with Bellator for "six fights with minimum performance compensation to Minakov of $300,000 per fight, for a total minimum value of $1,800,000."

== Personal life ==
Abdelaziz has publicly supported current US president Donald Trump.

=== Informant work ===
In 2002, Abdelaziz was imprisoned in Colorado on charges of document forgery. While in jail, he was recruited by the New York Police Department's Deputy Commissioner of Intelligence, David Cohen, to work undercover within a Virginia-based arm of a group called Muslims of America. Abdelaziz became one of Cohen's highest-paid informants at the time, "earning hundreds of thousands of dollars". The NYPD shared Abdelaziz with the FBI, becoming known as Confidential Informant 184. He was issued a green card, allowing him to leave and re-enter the United States. Abdelaziz worked in Trinidad and Tobago, Venezuela, and elsewhere in the world. The FBI eventually began to suspect he was operating as a double agent, having told people in Egypt of his life, particularly after he was reportedly administered a polygraph examination. The FBI ended its relationship with Abdelaziz and the American government unsuccessfully attempted to deport him. This information was publicized in the book Enemies Within, written by American journalists Adam Goldman and Matt Apuzzo, and was used by Conor McGregor in an attempt to antagonise Abdelaziz at the UFC 229 press conference.

Abdelaziz's time as an informant was also documented in the book Twilight in America, written by Christian Action Network founder Martin Mawyer and Patti Pierucci. In the book, Abdelaziz spoke of his eight years of experience gathering information about the Muslims of America, a group founded in 1980 by Sheikh Mubarak Ali Gilani, allegedly connected with the terrorist organization, Jamaat ul-Fuqra.

== Mixed martial arts record ==
Professional record breakdown
4 matches	1 win	3 losses
By submission	1	3

Res.	Record	Opponent	Method	Event	Date	Round	Time	Location	Notes
Loss	1–3	Caol Uno	Submission (armbar)	K-1 HERO'S 8	March 12, 2007	1	1:58	Nagoya, Japan	
Loss	1–2	Rocky Johnson	Submission (armbar)	Ring of Fire 26	September 9, 2006	1	2:50	Castle Rock, Colorado, United States	
Loss	1–1	Takuhiro Kamikozono	Submission (heel hook)	Ring of Fire 19	September 10, 2005	1	1:11	Castle Rock, Colorado, United States	
Win	1–0	Chee Bates	Submission (guillotine choke)	Ring of Fire 12	May 22, 2004	1	1:44	Castle Rock, Colorado, United States	

== Submission grappling record ==
Professional record breakdown
1 match	0 wins	1 loss
By submission	0	1

Result	Rec.	Opponent	Method	Time	Event	Division	Type	Year	Location
Loss	0-1	(Japan) Shinya Aoki	Submission (flying armbar)	0:12	Rickson Gracie's Budo Challenge	Middleweight	Gi	October 19, 2005	(United States) Los Angeles, CA
