= Hambletville, New York =

- Hamlet
- Location within the state of New York
- Coordinates: 42°05′48″N 75°23′35″W
- Country: United States
- State: New York
- County: Delaware
- Town: Deposit
- Elevation: 1,066 ft (325 m)
- Time zone: UTC-5 (Eastern (EST))
  - Summer (DST): UTC-4 (EDT)

Hambletville is a hamlet in Delaware County, New York, United States. It is located northeast of Deposit at the intersection of NY Route 8 and China Road. The East Branch Cold Spring Creek converges with Cold Spring Creek west of the hamlet.
