= Rock Rift Fire Observation Tower =

Historic site in Tompkins, New York, US

- U.S. National Register of Historic Places
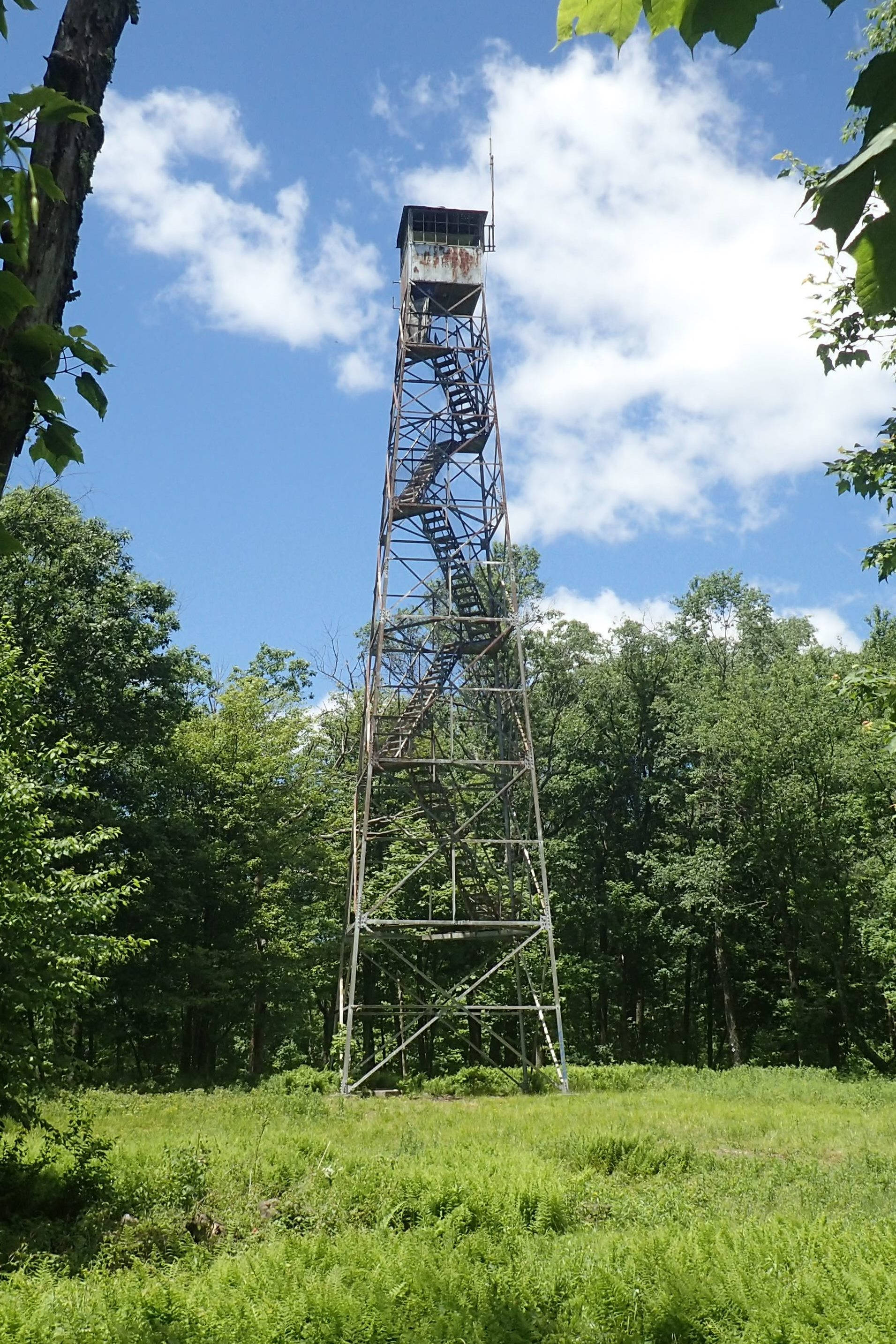
- Rock Rift Fire Tower in 2018

- Location within New York
- Nearest city: Tompkins, New York
- Coordinates: 42°06′14″N 75°13′06″W
- Built: 1934
- NRHP reference No.: 100003231
- Added to NRHP: July 12, 2018

Rock Rift Fire Observation Tower, also known as the Rock Rift Fire Tower, is a historic fire observation station located in the Town of Tompkins, Delaware County, New York. The tower stands at the summit of Tower Mountain at an elevation of 2,376 ft (724 m) and rises above the Cannonsville Reservoir, part of New York City's extensive water supply system. It was built in 1934 and listed on the National Register of Historic Places # 100003231 in 2018. The Rock Rift Fire Tower is also listed on the National Historic Lookout Register of the Forest Fire Lookout Association. Its listing numbers are US 1183, NY 41. The tower was transferred to the Town of Tompkins from New York State Department of Environmental Conservation in 2017. The land that the tower rests on is owned by New York City as part of their West of Hudson Watershed. The tower was decommissioned from active use in 1989.

== History ==
The Rock Rift Fire Tower was erected in 1934 by the Civilian Conservation Corps and was first staffed in 1935. It is a 1933 model International Derrick Co. fire tower. A characteristic of the 1933 model is nine individual window panes in each of the cab's eight windows. One panel of 9 window panes along each side of the cab can be pivoted along its horizontal midline and held open with a notched steel bar attached to the window sash. The 1933 and 1936 design of the International Derrick Fire Towers is arranged so that the flights of stairs, except for the lowest and highest, are oriented from one corner of the tower toward the corner diagonally opposite from it. This differs from the majority of fire towers in New York State. The measured heights of fire towers are given as the vertical distance from the top of the concrete piers to the floor of the observation cab. The Rock Rift Fire Tower is a 72 ft 9 in (22.17 m) tower with 97 steps from the ground pad to the cab.

New York City seized the hamlet of Rock Rift by eminent domain and evicted its inhabitants and businesses. New York City also did this in Cannonsville, Beerstown, Granton, and Rock Royal for the construction of the Cannonsville Reservoir. The water gates of the reservoir were closed in 1963 and the land on which the former homes, churches, businesses, schools stood were submerged. The reservoir was placed in service in 1965. Many of the homes and businesses of Rock Rift stood above the shoreline of the reservoir and they were also taken. Some of the roads, foundations and front stoops of the structures are still evident. The tower ceased fire lookout operations at the end of the 1988 season and was officially closed in early 1989.

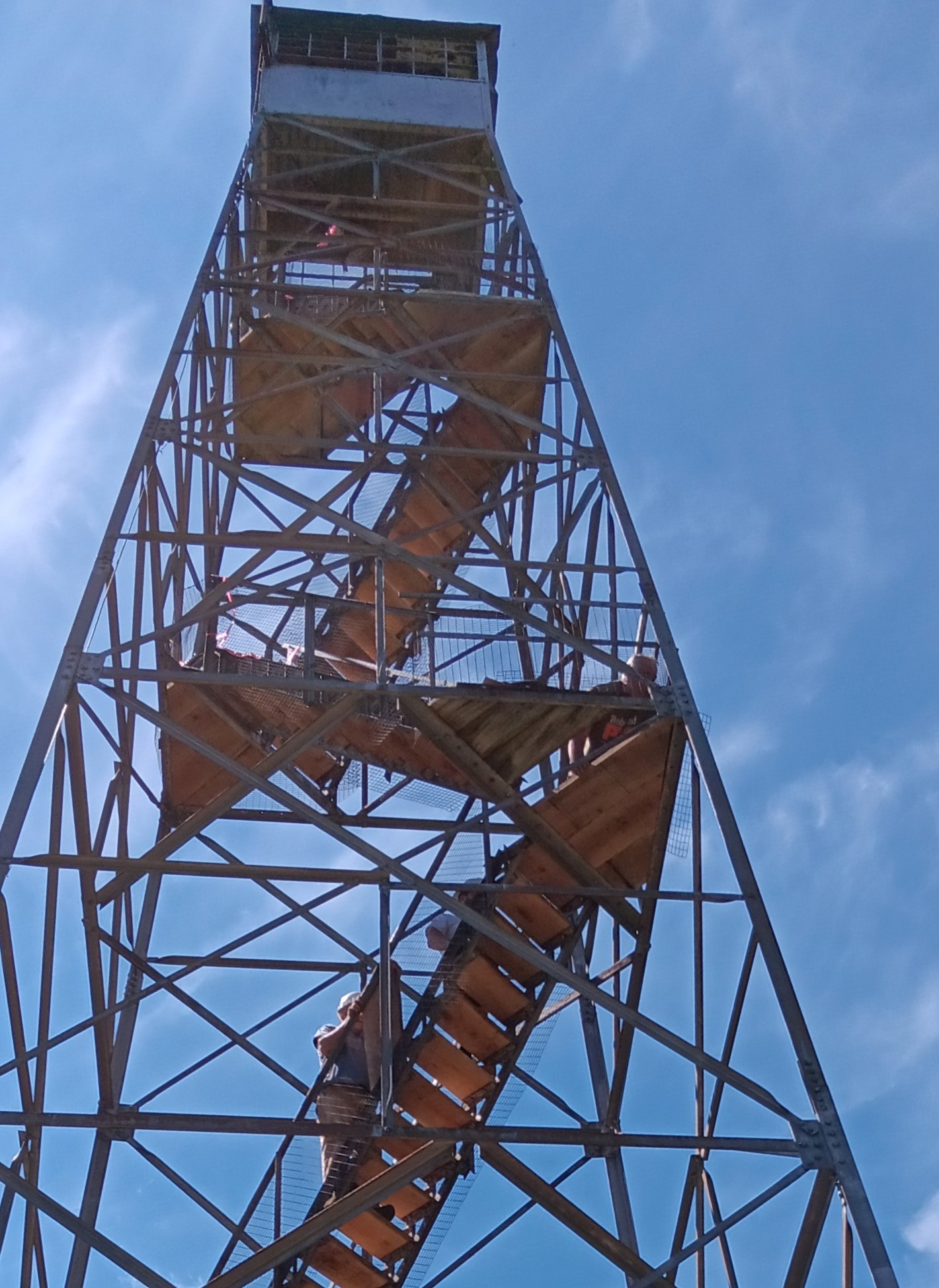
Volunteers working on rehabilitating the Rock Rift fire tower and putting the finishing touches on landing #4 (August 2025)

During the summer of 2025 the 97 stair treads and the six landings of the tower were replaced with rough sawn white oak lumber. When the steps are snow free, and weather conditions permit the tower may be climbed to just below the cab of the tower. Rehabilitation of the tower will continue during the summer of 2026. The rehabilitation was accomplished by the Town of Tompkins, The Forest Fire Lookout Association, other volunteers from the New York City Department of Environmental Protection, The Town of Tompkins Highway Department with support from Preservation League of New York State, Delaware County Board of Supervisors, The Tianaderrah Foundation / Robert L. Gipson and others.

== Trail ==
The Finger Lakes Trail Conference constructed and maintains the trail to the Rock Rift Fire Tower. These trails cross private and New York City reservoir lands. The New York Department of Environmental Protection police patrol these areas and their regulations require permits to park in areas other than designated parking areas and hiking in areas other than designated public access trails. Portions of the trail cross private lands and are closed during big game season.

== Preservation ==
Fire towers throughout the country are preserved and maintained for use in environmental conservation education, public outreach, and fire prevention education. These goals were always part of the mission of fire tower observers and their support network. The following quote is from the 1932 annual report of the NY Conservation Department.

... For the accommodation of hikers all trails leading to observation towers were cleaned and placed in good condition for travel. The popularity of the towers as a destination for vacation hikers results in thousands registering at them each year. The observers through these visitors have excellent opportunities to spread the gospel of care with fire in the open.
