= Bone Creek =

Bone Creek may refer to one of the following places:

- Bone Creek (Long Pine Creek tributary), a stream in Brown County, Nebraska, US
- Bone Creek (New York), a tributary of Oquaga Creek in Broome County, US
- Bone Creek (West Virginia), a stream in Ritchie County, US
- Bone Creek Township, Butler County, Nebraska, US
- Rural Municipality of Bone Creek No. 108, Saskatchewan, Canada
