= China, New York =

- Hamlet
- Location within the state of New York
- Coordinates: 42°08′41″N 75°24′01″W
- Country: United States
- State: New York
- County: Delaware
- Town: Deposit
- Elevation: 1,352 ft (412 m)
- Time zone: UTC-5 (Eastern (EST))
  - Summer (DST): UTC-4 (EDT)

China is a hamlet in Delaware County, New York, United States. It is located north-northeast of Deposit on China Road at its intersection with Schofield Road. Cold Spring Creek flows south through the hamlet.
