= Christian Action Network =

American non-profit organisation

- Formation: 1990; 36 years ago
- Founder: Martin Mawyer
- Type: 501(c)(3) non-profit organization
- Tax ID no.: 54-1756470
- Headquarters: Lynchburg, Virginia
- Key people: Martin Mawyer, President; David Carroll, Chairman
- Website: christianaction.org

Christian Action Network (CAN) is a Christian activist organization founded by Martin Mawyer in 1990. The organization states that its "primary goals are to protect America's religious and moral heritage through educational efforts."

The group has advocated on a number of issues, including actions against the National Endowment for the Arts, battles regarding First Amendment to the United States Constitution issues, and the Islamic community center to be built near the World Trade Center site in New York. The group has been described as part of the counter-jihad movement, and has been identified by the Southern Poverty Law Center as an anti-Muslim hate group.

== History ==
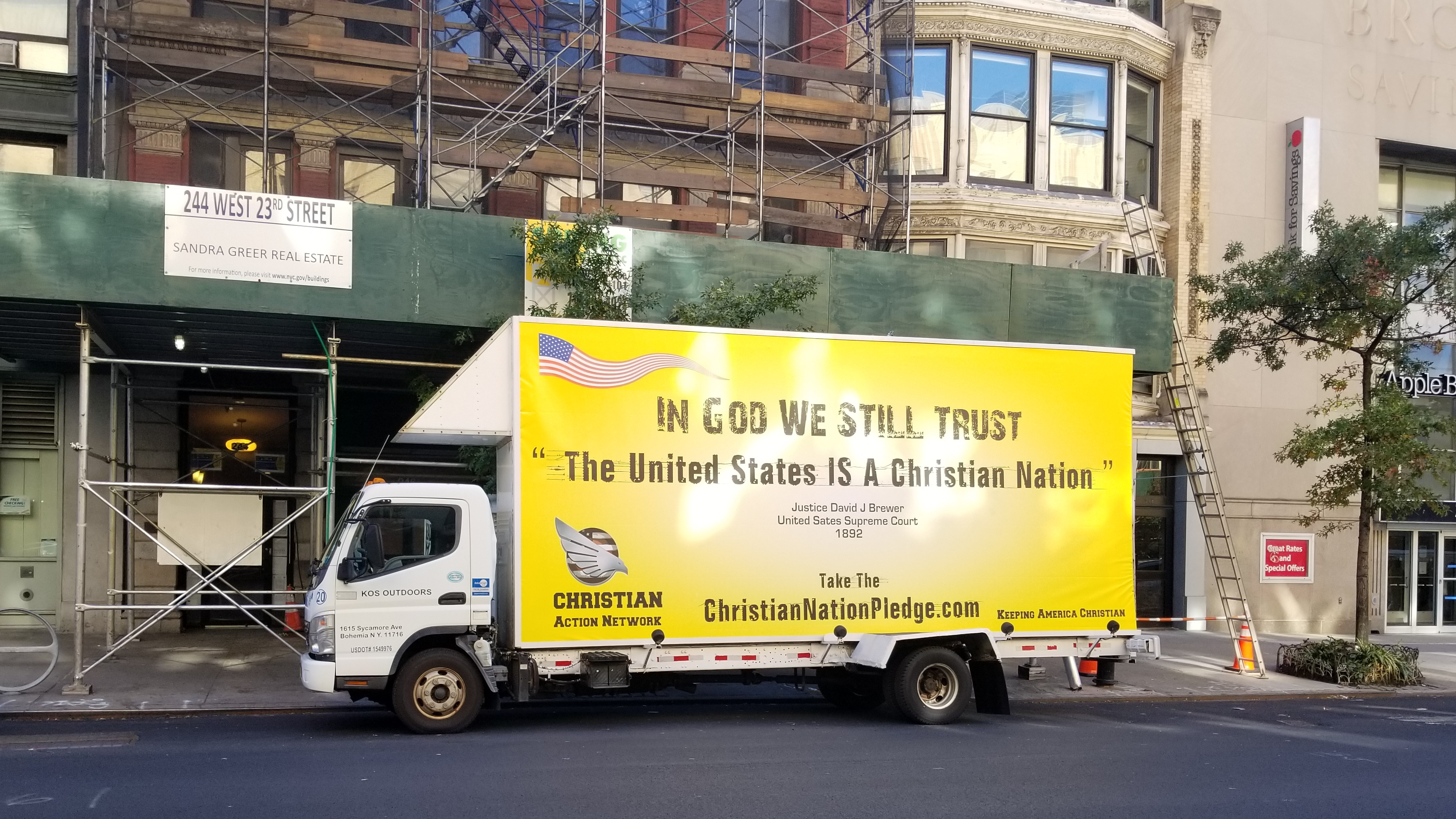
A billboard truck deployed by CAN in New York, November 2020.

The Christian Action Network was founded in 1990 with the goal to inform the public about issues which it believes affect "traditional Christian family values."

According to the company's website, founder Martin Mawyer began a journalism career in 1979 in Washington D.C. covering religious issues for the daily news service Religion Today and as a correspondent for Moody Monthly, an American religious magazine published by the Moody Bible Institute. Mawyer went on to become the editor of Jerry Falwell’s Moral Majority Report, a news publication of the Moral Majority, where he served from 1980 to 1988.

== Action against the National Endowment for the Arts (NEA) ==
In 1993 CAN conducted several protests of the funding of what it called obscenity by the NEA. In July Mawyer's group hand-delivered letters to 114 freshman members of Congress and Republican congressional leaders urging them to abolish the NEA on the basis of a concurrent art exhibit at New York's Whitney Museum of American Art. The show "Abject Art: Repulsion and Desire" featured images of excrement and homoerotic acts.

On July 29 the group set up a photography show at the U.S. Capitol that featured sexually explicit photographs by Joel-Peter Witkin, an artist funded by NEA grants. The exhibit was abruptly banned from the Capitol before it could publicly open and was then closed down by House Speaker Tom Foley after 15 minutes at a second location.

The following September, CAN distributed 15-minute video tapes to President Bill Clinton and members of Congress that contained clips of pornographic films that the group said had the "stamp of approval" of the NEA. The 15-minute tapes contained excerpts from three films shown at the Pittsburgh International Gay and Lesbian Film Festival in July 1991, which Mawyer said had been funded by NEA grants. An NEA spokeswoman disputed that the funding had supported those specific films.

== Defense of lawsuit by Federal Election Commission ==
The Federal Election Commission (FEC) accused CAN in 1995 of violating the Federal Election Campaign Act by running television commercials prior to the 1992 presidential election that asserted Democratic candidate Bill Clinton supported job quotas for homosexuals as a kind of Affirmative Action. The commercials aired in 25 cities. In 1995 the U.S. District Court for the Western District of Virginia granted CAN's motion to dismiss the complaint. In 1996 the Fourth U.S. Circuit Court of Appeals affirmed the decision, finding that because the commercials did not expressly advocate for the election or defeat of the candidate, they were not a violation of the Act.

== Action against Gay Days at Walt Disney World ==
In June 1999, Mawyer and an accomplice went into nightclub at Downtown Disney during Gay Days at Walt Disney World, obtaining hidden-camera video of men simulating sex acts as they danced onstage. CAN cut the footage into a video, showing it at a news conference at the National Press Club. CAN threatened to boycott Disney unless the company agreed to warn families entering its parks and booking hotel rooms during the annual Gay Days event.

Although Disney did not change any of its policies after the expose, a spokesman did acknowledge that the dancing men in the video were Disney employees and that whoever was responsible for the dance routine would be disciplined.

== Campaign against the “Ground Zero Mosque” ==
The organization had a nationwide screening tour that included stops near speaking engagements by Imam Feisal Abdul Rauf, the former spokesman for Park51. The group's campaign received wide press coverage.

CAN and American Center for Law and Justice threatened the New York City Department of Parks & Recreation with legal action after it was unable to get permits to show its film in several public parks around the tenth anniversary of the September 11, 2001 attacks. The Department said the parks were unavailable. The organization then announced that they were granted permits to show its film in several parks.

On September 7, 2011, congressman Allen West (R-FL) hosted a screening of the film in the Rayburn House Office Building in Congress, where he reiterated his opposition to Park51 alongside several people who lost family members in the September 11th attacks.

Congressman Keith Ellison (D-MN) responded by sponsoring an event on September 13, 2011, to publicize a report about the "Islamophobia network" in the U.S. The report criticized Rep. Allen West for spreading anti-Muslim sentiment and for his involvement in the event at which the work was screened. It also criticized the Christian Action Network and other participants.

In August 2011, CAN announced a "Counter-Jihad Summit", which stated that "Our public schools are sneaking into their curricula pro-Islamic teachings that actually promote Sharia law. An entire generation of our children is being brainwashed!" Mawyer is also connected to the counter-jihad movement by being on the advisory board of the International Free Press Society.

== Media and litigation regarding Muslims of America ==
In 2009, CAN released a video titled Homegrown Jihad: The terrorist camps around U.S., which was followed in 2012 by the book Twilight in America: The Untold Story of Islamic Terrorist Training Camps Inside America. Both the book and film described the activities of the group Muslims of America, which set up religious hamlets, such as Islamberg in New York and Holy Islamville in South Carolina. Muslims of America was portrayed as the creation of Sufi Cleric Sheikh Syed Mubarik Ali Shah Gilani, a Pakistani cleric who was alleged by the U.S. Government to be associated with the terrorist organization Jamaat ul-Fuqra.

In 2013, The Muslims of America, based in Hancock, N.Y., sued Mawyer, a co-author and the Christian Action Network for $3 million in federal court in Syracuse, N.Y., seeking also to halt the continued publication of Twilight in America: The Untold Story of Islamic Training Camps in America. In 2014 the suit was dismissed by a federal judge on the grounds that the Muslims of America lacked standing to sue, since the allegations in the book on which its claims were based pertained to a different organization, Muslims of the Americas Inc., which had dissolved in March 2013.
