= Tower Mountain (New York) =

Mountain in New York, United States

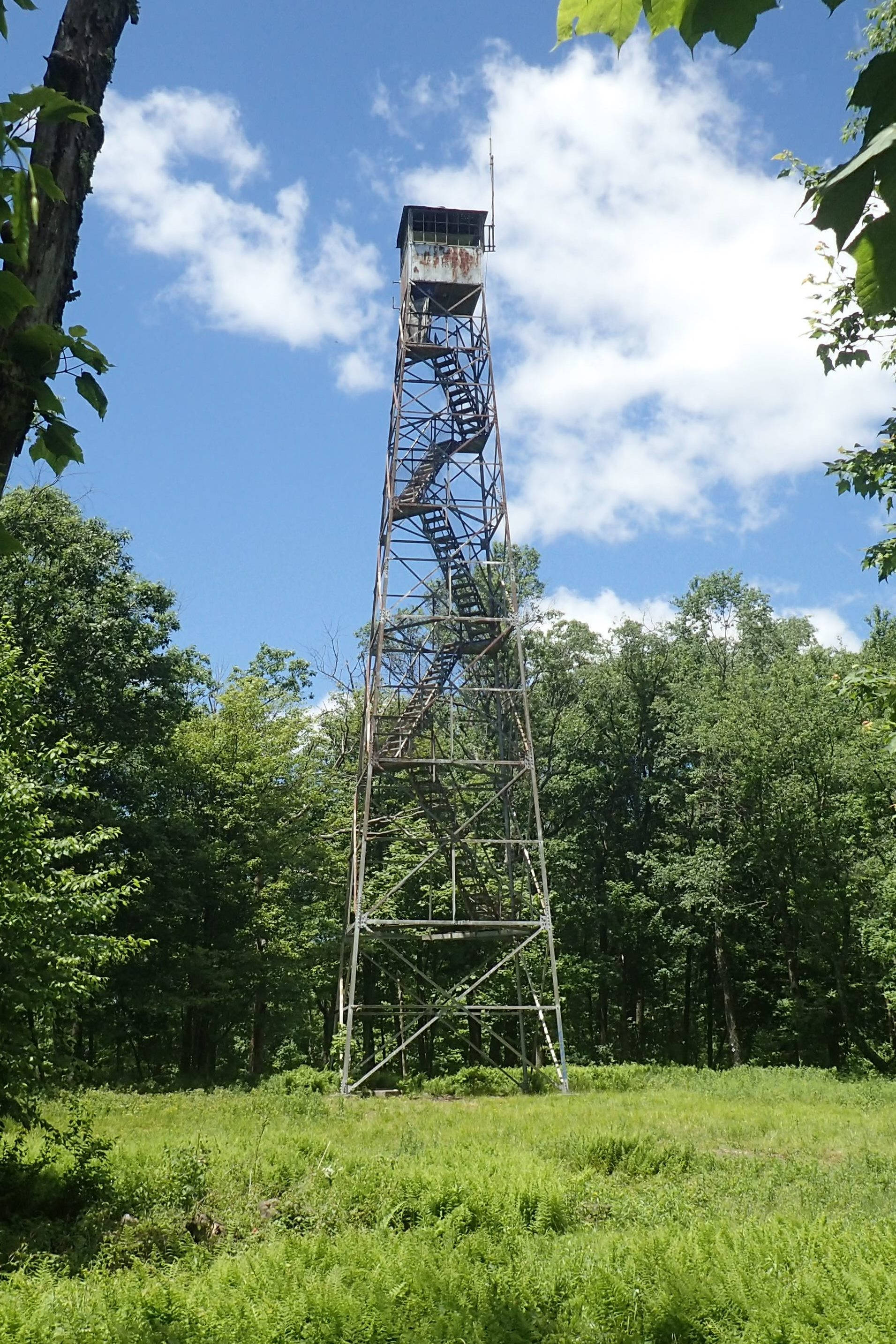
- Rock Rift Fire Tower June 2018

Highest point
- Elevation: 2,320 feet (710 m)
- Coordinates: 42°06′34″N 75°13′34″W

Geography
- Location within New York Location within the United States
- Location: ENE of Deposit, Delaware County, New York, U.S.
- Topo map: USGS Readburn

Tower Mountain is a mountain located in the Catskill Mountains of New York state, east-northeast of Deposit in Delaware County. Speedwell Mountain is located west-southwest of Tower Mountain, Walton Mountain is located north-northeast of it, and Crane Hill is located northeast of Tower Mountain. In 1934, the Civilian Conservation Corps built what was known as the Rock Rift Fire Observation Tower on the mountain. The tower ceased fire lookout operations at the end of the 1988 season and was officially closed in early 1989. Currently, the tower is not safe to climb. The first set of steps has been removed to prevent injury. Restoration of the tower is planned by the Town of Tompkins.

== History ==
The Rock Rift Fire Observation Tower was erected in 1934 by the Civilian Conservation Corps and was first staffed in 1935. It is a 1933 model International Derrick Company fire tower. A characteristic of the 1933 model is nine individual window panes in each of the cab’s eight windows. One panel of 9 window panes along each side of the cab can be pivoted along its horizontal midline and held open with a notched steel bar attached to the window sash. The 1933 and 1936 design of the International Derrick Fire Towers is arranged so that the flights of stairs, except for the lowest and highest, are oriented from one corner of the tower towards the corner diagonally opposite from it. This differs from the majority of fire towers in New York State. The measured heights of fire towers are given as the vertical distance from the top of the concrete piers to the floor of the observation cab. The Rock Rift Fire Tower is a 72 ft 9 in (22.17 m) tower with 97 steps from the ground pad to the cab.

New York City seized the hamlet of Rock Rift by eminent domain and evicted its inhabitants and businesses. NYC also did this in Cannonsville, Beerstown, Granton, and Rock Royal for the construction of the Cannonsville Reservoir. The water gates of the reservoir were closed in 1963 and the land on which the former homes, churches, businesses, schools stood were submerged. The reservoir was placed in service in 1965. Many of the homes and businesses of Rock Rift stood above the shoreline of the reservoir and they were also taken. Some of the roads, foundations and front stoops of the structures are still evident. The tower ceased fire lookout operations at the end of the 1988 season and was officially closed in early 1989. Currently, the tower is not safe to climb. The first set of steps has been removed to prevent injury. Restoration of the tower is planned by the Town of Tompkins.
