= Fish Brook =

- Location of the mouth of Fish Brook

Location
- Country: United States
- State: New York
- County: Delaware

Physical characteristics
- Source
  - coordinates: 42°07′29″N 75°12′54″W
- Mouth: Cannonsville Reservoir
  - coordinates: 42°04′59″N 75°13′23″W
  - elevation: 1,148 ft (350 m)

Fish Brook is a river in Delaware County, New York. It flows into Cannonsville Reservoir west-southwest of Rock Rift.
