= Arctic Lake =

- Location within New York Location within the United States
- Location: Broome County, New York, United States
- Coordinates: 42°10′46″N 75°25′32″W
- Type: Lake
- Primary inflows: Oquaga Creek
- Primary outflows: Oquaga Creek
- Basin countries: United States
- Surface area: 60 acres (0.24 km^{2})
- Average depth: 10 feet (3.0 m)
- Max. depth: 33 ft (10 m)
- Surface elevation: 1,560 ft (480 m)
- Settlements: North Sanford, New York

Arctic Lake is a man-made lake located by North Sanford, New York. Fish species present in the lake include pumpkinseed sunfish, black bullhead, rainbow trout, and black bass. There is carry down access located in the park on the northwest corner.
