= Beales Pond =

- Location of Beales Pond within New York
- Location: Delaware County, New York
- Coordinates: 42°12′07″N 75°22′44″W
- Type: Lake
- Primary outflows: East Branch Cold Spring Creek
- Surface area: 14 acres (0.022 mi^{2}; 5.7 ha)
- Surface elevation: 1,640 feet (500 m)
- Settlements: Masonville

Beales Pond is a small lake located south of the hamlet of Masonville in Delaware County, New York. Beales Pond drains south via East Branch Cold Spring Creek which flows into Cold Spring Creek, which flows into the West Branch Delaware River.

== See also ==
- List of lakes in New York
