= List of lakes of Franklin County, Arkansas =

There are at least 33 named lakes and reservoirs in Franklin County, Arkansas.

== Lakes ==
According to the United States Geological Survey, there are no named lakes in Franklin County.

== Reservoirs ==
- Lake Dardanelle, 35°21′14″N 093°23′46″W, el. 338 feet (103 m)
- Darby Lake, 35°15′49″N 094°01′57″W, el. 502 feet (153 m)
- Ozark Lake, 35°27′38″N 094°01′45″W, el. 371 feet (113 m)
- Charleston Lake, 35°16′55″N 094°02′59″W, el. 486 feet (148 m)
- Ozark City Lake, 35°31′58″N 093°50′03″W, el. 617 feet (188 m)
- Shores Lake, 35°38′19″N 093°57′33″W, el. 636 feet (194 m)
- Swiss Family Vineyards Reservoir, 35°27′36″N 093°44′07″W, el. 771 feet (235 m)
- Bruce Lake, 35°35′35″N 094°03′14″W, el. 892 feet (272 m)
- Sixmile Creek Site 17 Reservoir, 35°22′12″N 093°49′31″W, el. 482 feet (147 m)
- Sixmile Creek Site 16 Reservoir, 35°21′18″N 093°49′07″W, el. 374 feet (114 m)
- Sixmile Creek Site 18 Reservoir, 35°22′33″N 093°52′40″W, el. 453 feet (138 m)
- Sixmile Creek Site 26 Reservoir, 35°20′11″N 093°52′28″W, el. 390 feet (120 m)
- Sixmile Creek Site 25 Reservoir, 35°20′48″N 093°53′31″W, el. 387 feet (118 m)
- Sixmile Creek Site One Reservoir, 35°19′10″N 093°52′13″W, el. 390 feet (120 m)
- Sixmile Creek Site 21 Reservoir, 35°23′19″N 093°58′12″W, el. 495 feet (151 m)
- Sixmile Creek Site 22 Reservoir, 35°22′36″N 093°58′34″W, el. 433 feet (132 m)
- Sixmile Creek Site 23 Reservoir, 35°21′25″N 093°59′07″W, el. 427 feet (130 m)
- Sixmile Creek Site 24 Reservoir, 35°19′42″N 093°58′01″W, el. 436 feet (133 m)
- Sixmile Creek Site 13 Reservoir, 35°16′54″N 093°56′19″W, el. 443 feet (135 m)
- Sixmile Creek Site 14 Reservoir, 35°16′00″N 094°01′43″W, el. 489 feet (149 m)
- Lake Cecil, 36°28′00″N 091°31′49″W, el. 459 feet (140 m)
- Flanagan Lake, 35°23′13″N 093°57′58″W, el. 495 feet (151 m)
- Lake Number 20, 35°24′08″N 093°59′58″W, el. 610 feet (190 m)
- Lake Number 21, 35°23′19″N 093°58′12″W, el. 495 feet (151 m)
- Lake Number 22, 35°22′36″N 093°58′34″W, el. 433 feet (132 m)
- Lake Number One, 35°19′10″N 093°52′13″W, el. 390 feet (120 m)
- Lake Number Seventeen, 35°22′15″N 093°49′43″W, el. 436 feet (133 m)
- Lake Number Sixteen, 35°21′25″N 093°49′07″W, el. 374 feet (114 m)
- Lake Number Thirteen, 35°16′55″N 093°56′31″W, el. 427 feet (130 m)
- Lake Number Twentyfive, 35°20′40″N 093°53′35″W, el. 377 feet (115 m)
- Lake Number Twentyfour, 35°19′42″N 093°58′01″W, el. 436 feet (133 m)
- Lake Number Twentysix, 35°20′11″N 093°52′28″W, el. 390 feet (120 m)
- Lake Number Twentythree, 35°21′25″N 093°59′07″W, el. 427 feet (130 m)

== See also ==
- List of lakes in Arkansas
