= Rock Rift =

Rock Rift may refer to the following locations in Delaware County, New York:

- Rock Rift, New York, a hamlet
- Rock Rift Mountain, a mountain in New York state
