= Bullock Brook =

- Location of the mouth of Bullock Brook

Location
- Country: United States
- State: New York
- County: Delaware

Physical characteristics
- Source
  - coordinates: 42°12′04″N 75°15′18″W
- Mouth: Trout Creek
  - coordinates: 42°10′46″N 75°16′34″W
  - elevation: 1,178 ft (359 m)

Bullock Brook is a river in Delaware County, New York. It flows into Trout Creek south of the hamlet of Trout Creek.
