= Steam Mill Branch =

- Location of the mouth of Steam Mill Branch

Location
- Country: United States
- State: New York
- County: Delaware

Physical characteristics
- Source
  - coordinates: 42°12′24″N 75°20′25″W
- Mouth: East Branch Cold Spring Creek
  - coordinates: 42°09′07″N 75°21′18″W
  - elevation: 1,316 ft (401 m)

Steam Mill Branch is a river in Delaware County, New York. It flows into East Branch Cold Spring Creek north of Barbourville.

== Steam Mill State Forest ==
Steam Mill Branch flows through Steam Mill State Forest. The 5,618 acres (8.778 mi^{2}) state forest is accessed by Steam Mill Road, Mormon Hollow Road and Carroll Hill Road. It is almost totally forested with plantations and naturally, which will provide good hunting opportunities for most game species. The forest also has hiking and snowmobile trails and limited fishing opportunities on the Steam Mill Branch.
