= List of places in New York: U =

This list of current cities, towns, unincorporated communities, counties, and other recognized places in the U.S. state of New York also includes information on the number and names of counties in which the place lies, and its lower and upper zip code bounds, if applicable.

List of places in New York: A | B | C | D | E | F | G | H | I | J | K | L | M | N | O | P | Q | R | S | T | U | V | W | X | Y | Z

Name of place	Counties	Principal county	Lower zip code	Upper zip code
Ulster	1	Ulster County		
Ulster Heights	1	Ulster County	12428	
Ulster Landing	1	Ulster County	12477	
Ulster Park	1	Ulster County	12487	
Ulsterville	1	Ulster County	12566	
Ulysses	1	Tompkins County		
Unadilla	1	Otsego County	13849	
Unadilla	1	Otsego County		
Unadilla Center	1	Otsego County		
Unadilla Forks	1	Otsego County	13491	
Undercliff	1	Essex County		
Underwood	1	Essex County		
Underwood Club	1	Essex County	12964	
Uneeda Beach	1	Niagara County		
Union	1	Broome County	13760	
Union	1	Broome County		
Union	1	Madison County		
Union Center	1	Broome County	13760	
Union Center	1	Ulster County		
Union Corners	1	Genesee County		
Union Corners	1	Livingston County		
Uniondale	1	Nassau County	11553	
Union Falls	1	Clinton County	12912	
Union Hill	2	Monroe County	14563	
Union Hill	2	Wayne County	14563	
Union Mills	1	Fulton County	12025	
Unionport	1	Bronx County		
Union Settlement	1	Oswego County		
Union Springs	1	Cayuga County	13160	
Union Vale	1	Dutchess County		
Union Valley	2	Chenango County	13052	
Union Valley	2	Cortland County	13052	
Unionville	1	Albany County	12054	
Unionville	1	Ontario County	14532	
Unionville	1	Orange County	10988	
Unionville	1	St. Lawrence County	13676	
Unionville	1	Steuben County		
Unionville	1	Sullivan County	12740	
United States Military Academy	1	Orange County	10996	
United States Public Health Hospital	1	Richmond County	10304	
University	1	Onondaga County	13210	
University Gardens	1	Nassau County	11020	
University Heights	1	Bronx County	10452	
Upper Barbourville	1	Delaware County		
Upper Beechwood	1	Sullivan County		
Upper Benson	1	Hamilton County	12134	
Upper Brookville	1	Nassau County	11545	
Upper Delaware Scenic & Recreational River	3	Delaware County	12726	
Upper Delaware Scenic & Recreational River	3	Orange County	12726	
Upper Delaware Scenic & Recreational River	3	Sullivan County	12726	
Upper Fairfield	1	Tioga County		
Upper Grand View	1	Rockland County	10960	
Upper Hollowville	1	Columbia County		
Upper Jay	1	Essex County	12987	
Upper Lisle	1	Broome County	13862	
Upper Mongaup	1	Sullivan County	12737	
Upper Nyack	1	Rockland County	10960	
Upper Red Hook	1	Dutchess County	12571	
Upper St. Regis	1	Franklin County	12945	
Upper Union	1	Schenectady County	12309	
Upperville	1	Chenango County	13464	
Upson Corners	1	Oswego County		
Upton	1	Suffolk County	11973	
Upton Lake	1	Dutchess County	12514	
Uptonville	1	Monroe County		
Uptown	1	Ulster County	12401	
Urbana	1	Steuben County	14840	
Urbana	1	Steuben County		
U S C C	1	Orange County	10997	
Ushers	1	Saratoga County	12151	
Utica	1	Oneida County	13501	05
Utopia	1	Queens County	11366	
