= Dry Brook (Cannonsville Reservoir tributary) =

- Location of the mouth of Dry Brook

Location
- Country: United States
- State: New York
- County: Delaware

Physical characteristics
- Source
  - coordinates: 42°10′31″N 75°19′38″W
- Mouth: Cannonsville Reservoir
  - coordinates: 42°07′45″N 75°18′34″W
  - elevation: 1,148 ft (350 m)

Basin features
- Tributaries
  - right: Barbour Brook

Dry Brook is a river in Delaware County, New York. It flows into Cannonsville Reservoir northeast of Stilesville.
