= Fly Creek (Oquaga Creek tributary) =

Location
- Country: United States
- State: New York

Physical characteristics
- Source
  - location: Broome County, New York
- Mouth: Oquaga Creek
  - location: McClure, New York, Broome County, New York, United States
  - coordinates: 42°03′00″N 75°29′50″W
- Basin size: 12.7 mi^{2} (33 km^{2})

Fly Creek flows into the Oquaga Creek by McClure, New York.
