= West Branch Trout Creek =

- Location of the mouth of West Branch Trout Creek

Location
- Country: United States
- State: New York
- County: Delaware

Physical characteristics
- Source
  - coordinates: 42°14′57″N 75°15′53″W
- Mouth: Trout Creek
  - coordinates: 42°12′13″N 75°16′32″W
  - elevation: 1,257 ft (383 m)

West Branch Trout Creek is a river in Delaware County, New York. It flows into Trout Creek in the hamlet of Trout Creek.
