= Barbour Brook =

River in Delaware County

- Location of the mouth of Barbour Brook

Location
- Country: United States
- State: New York
- County: Delaware

Physical characteristics
- Source
  - coordinates: 42°09′17″N 75°20′17″W
- Mouth: Dry Brook
  - coordinates: 42°08′18″N 75°18′43″W
  - elevation: 1,247 ft (380 m)

Barbour Brook is a river in Delaware County, New York. It flows into Dry Brook northeast of Stilesville.
