= Silver Lake (Delaware County, New York) =

Lake near New York

- Location of Silver Lake within New York
- Location: Delaware County, New York
- Coordinates: 42°02′13″N 75°21′39″W
- Primary inflows: Roods Creek
- Primary outflows: Roods Creek
- Basin countries: United States
- Surface area: 27 acres (11 ha)
- Surface elevation: 1,302 ft (397 m)
- Settlements: Stilesville

Silver Lake is a small lake southeast of Stilesville in Delaware County, New York. Roods Creek flows through Silver Lake.

== See also ==
- List of lakes in New York
