= Cannonsville, New York =

Town in New York, United States

Coordinates: 42.0807°N 75.3218°W

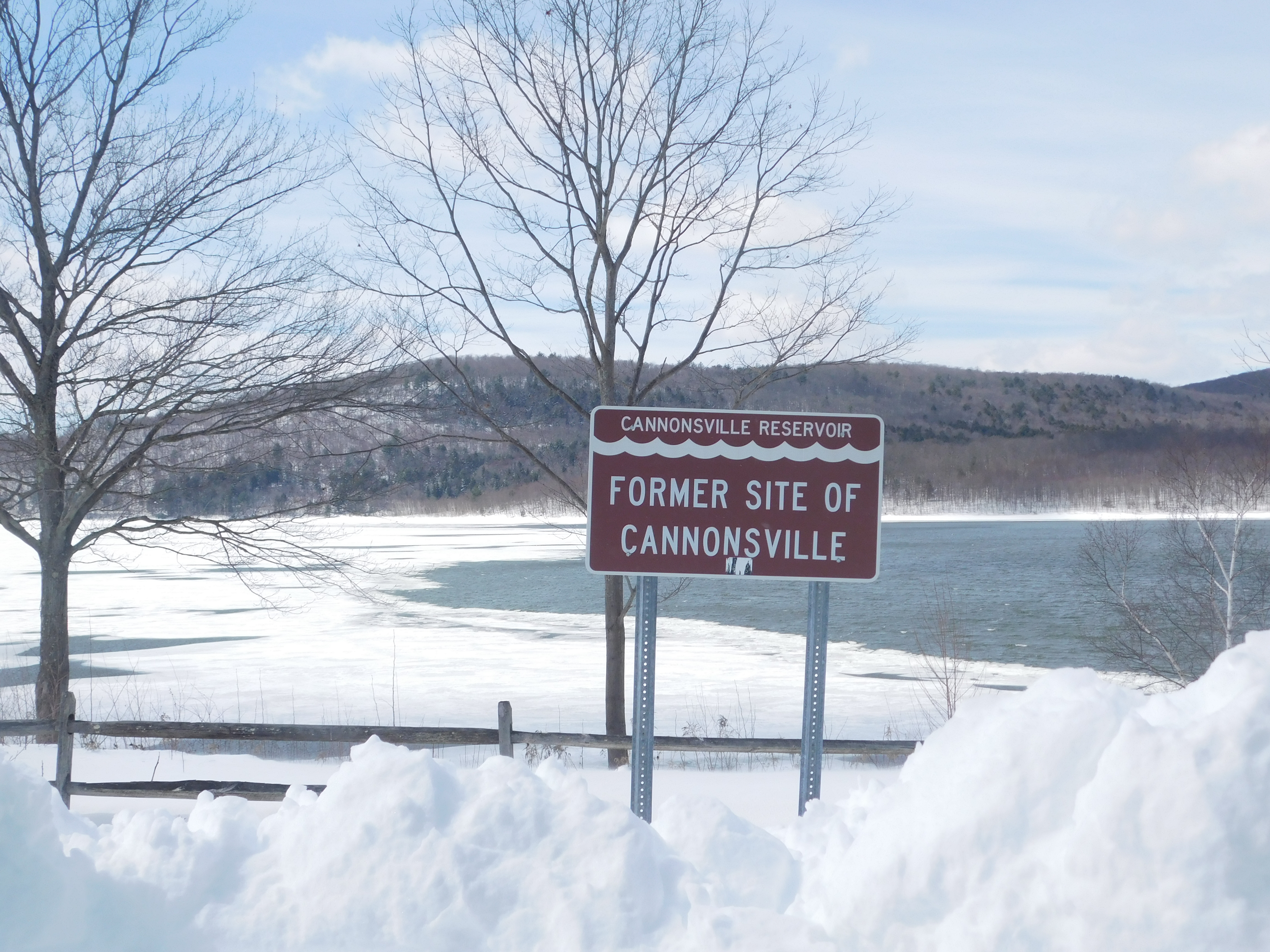
Signage denoting the site of Cannonsville

Cannonsville was a town in Delaware County in Upstate New York. It was founded in the late 18th century and survived until 1964, when it was destroyed to create the Cannonsville Reservoir. The reservoir is part of the Delaware System and provides water to New York City located in the present-day town of Tompkins. Cannonsville was named after Benjamin Cannon, Sr., alternately credited with building the town's first house and being its first Postmaster.

In 1960, Jules Victor Schwerin produced the documentary film Indian Summer about the destruction of Cannonsville and the creation of the Cannonsville Reservoir, where the cast included Grant Rogers, a Catskill singer/songwriter, as well as other townspeople. American folk singers Pete and Mike Seeger did the music for the film. In 2022, Indian Summer was digitally restored from the original 35mm film elements and preserved back into 35mm film by Charles Cadkin and BB Optics, Inc. The original film elements reside in the Museum of Modern Art's permanent collection.

The new short film, The Fall of Cannonsville, was premiered in 2023 by Charles Cadkin at the Museum of Modern Art alongside the newly preserved copy of Indian Summer. The Fall of Cannonsville features interviews conducted in 2019 and 2022 with Cannonsville residents paired with archival material and landscape footage of the area.
