= Crystal Lake (Delaware County, New York) =

Lake in Delaware County, New York, United States

- Location of Crystal Lake within New York
- Location: Delaware County, New York
- Coordinates: 42°03′06″N 75°21′39″W
- Primary inflows: Roods Creek
- Primary outflows: Roods Creek
- Basin countries: United States
- Surface area: 34 acres (0.053 mi^{2}; 14 ha)
- Surface elevation: 1,414 feet (431 m)
- Settlements: Stilesville

Crystal Lake is a small lake southeast of Stilesville in Delaware County, New York. Roods Creek flows through the lake.

== See also ==
- List of lakes in New York
