= Laurel Creek =

- Location of the mouth of Laurel Creek

Location
- Country: United States
- State: New York
- County: Delaware

Physical characteristics
- Source
  - coordinates: 42°03′18″N 75°19′16″W
- Mouth: Roods Creek
  - coordinates: 42°00′56″N 75°21′12″W
  - elevation: 1,056 ft (322 m)

Laurel Creek is a river in Delaware County, New York. It flows into the Roods Creek east-northeast of Hale Eddy.
