= Cabin Brook =

- Location of the mouth of Cabin Brook

Location
- Country: United States
- State: New York
- County: Delaware

Physical characteristics
- Source
  - coordinates: 42°08′18″N 75°25′34″W
- Mouth: Cold Spring Creek
  - coordinates: 42°07′18″N 75°23′54″W
  - elevation: 1,178 ft (359 m)

Cabin Brook is a river in Broome County, New York and Delaware County, New York. It flows into Cold Spring Creek north of Stilesville.
