= Upper Barbourville, New York =

- Hamlet
- Location within the state of New York
- Coordinates: 42°09′36″N 75°21′20″W
- Country: United States
- State: New York
- County: Delaware
- Town: Deposit
- Elevation: 1,404 ft (428 m)
- Time zone: UTC-5 (Eastern (EST))
  - Summer (DST): UTC-4 (EDT)

Upper Barbourville is a hamlet in Delaware County, New York, United States. It is located northeast of Stilesville on NY Route 8. The East Branch Cold Spring Creek flows south through the hamlet.
