= Maxwell Brook =

- Location of the mouth of Maxwell Brook

Location
- Country: United States
- State: New York
- County: Delaware

Physical characteristics
- Source
  - coordinates: 42°07′17″N 75°13′47″W
- Mouth: Cannonsville Reservoir
  - coordinates: 42°06′39″N 75°15′16″W
  - elevation: 1,148 ft (350 m)

Maxwell Brook is a river in Delaware County, New York. It flows into Cannonsville Reservoir west-northwest of Rock Rift.
