= Sherruck Brook =

- Location of the mouth of Sherruck Brook

Location
- Country: United States
- State: New York
- County: Delaware

Physical characteristics
- Source
  - coordinates: 42°12′23″N 75°19′44″W
- Mouth: Cannonsville Reservoir
  - coordinates: 42°09′21″N 75°17′18″W
  - elevation: 1,148 ft (350 m)

Sherruck Brook is a river in Delaware County, New York. It flows into Cannonsville Reservoir northeast of Stilesville.
