= Dryden Brook (New York) =

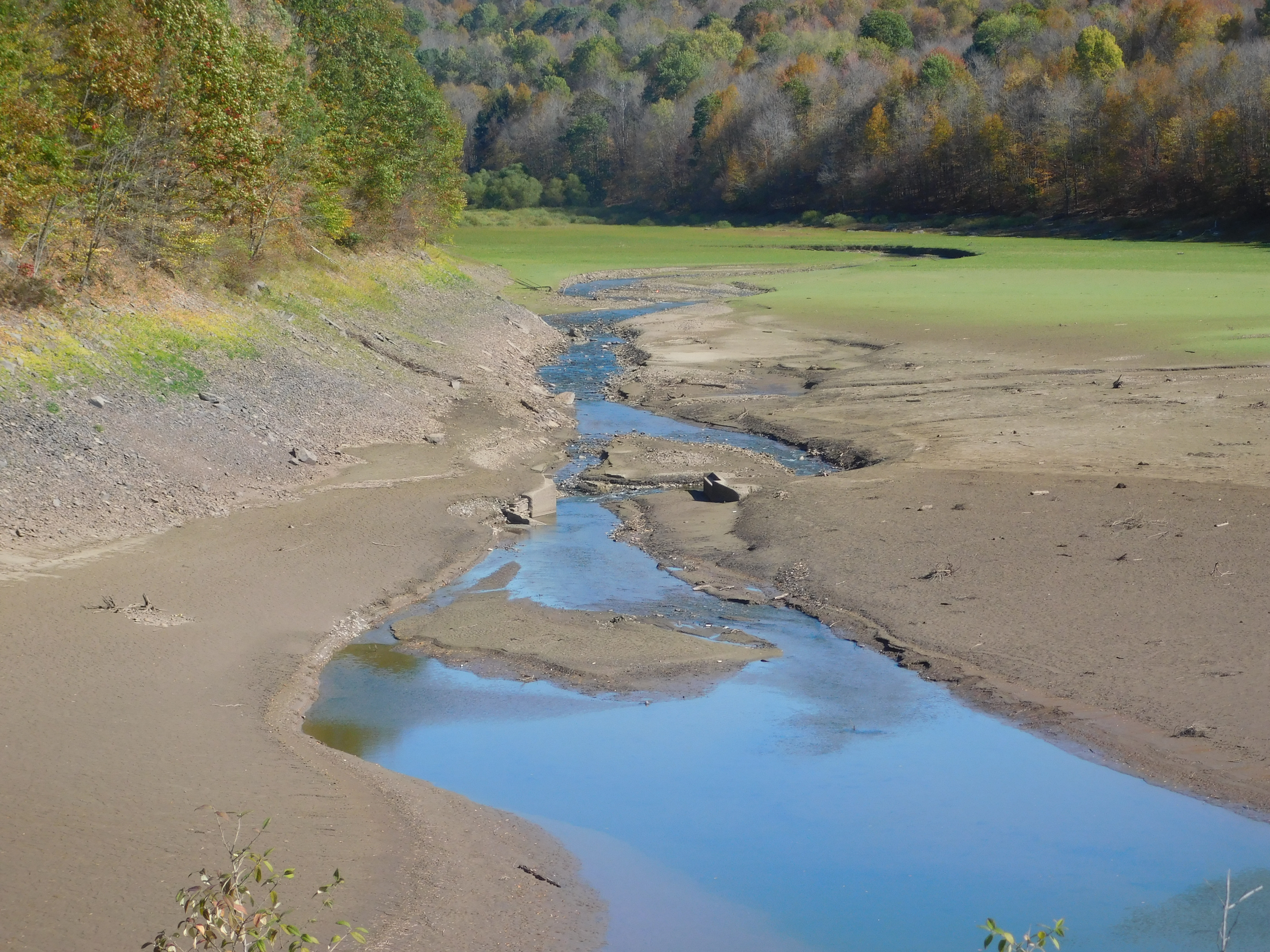
- Dryden Brook's original alignment under the Cannonsville Reservoir in October 2025, during a drought

- Location of the mouth of Dryden Brook

Location
- Country: United States
- State: New York
- County: Delaware

Physical characteristics
- Source
  - coordinates: 42°10′51″N 75°12′25″W
- Mouth: Cannonsville Reservoir
  - coordinates: 42°06′36″N 75°15′42″W
  - elevation: 1,148 ft (350 m)

Dryden Brook is a river in Delaware County, New York. It flows into Cannonsville Reservoir west-northwest of Rock Rift.
