= Lake Cecil =

Lake in New York, United States

- Location of Lake Cecil within New York
- Location: Delaware County, New York
- Coordinates: 42°13′46″N 75°16′18″W
- Basin countries: United States
- Surface area: 3 acres (1.2 ha)
- Surface elevation: 1,788 ft (545 m)
- Settlements: Trout Creek

Lake Cecil is a small lake located north-northeast of the hamlet of Trout Creek in Delaware County, New York. It drains south via an unnamed creek that flows into Trout Creek.

== See also ==
- List of lakes in New York
