= Johnny Brook =

- Location of the mouth of Johnny Brook

Location
- Country: United States
- State: New York
- County: Delaware

Physical characteristics
- Source
  - coordinates: 42°08′04″N 75°19′50″W
- Mouth: Cannonsville Reservoir
  - coordinates: 42°04′57″N 75°20′20″W
  - elevation: 1,148 ft (350 m)

Johnny Brook is a river in Delaware County, New York. It flows into Cannonsville Reservoir east-northeast of Stilesville.
