= Oquaga Creek =

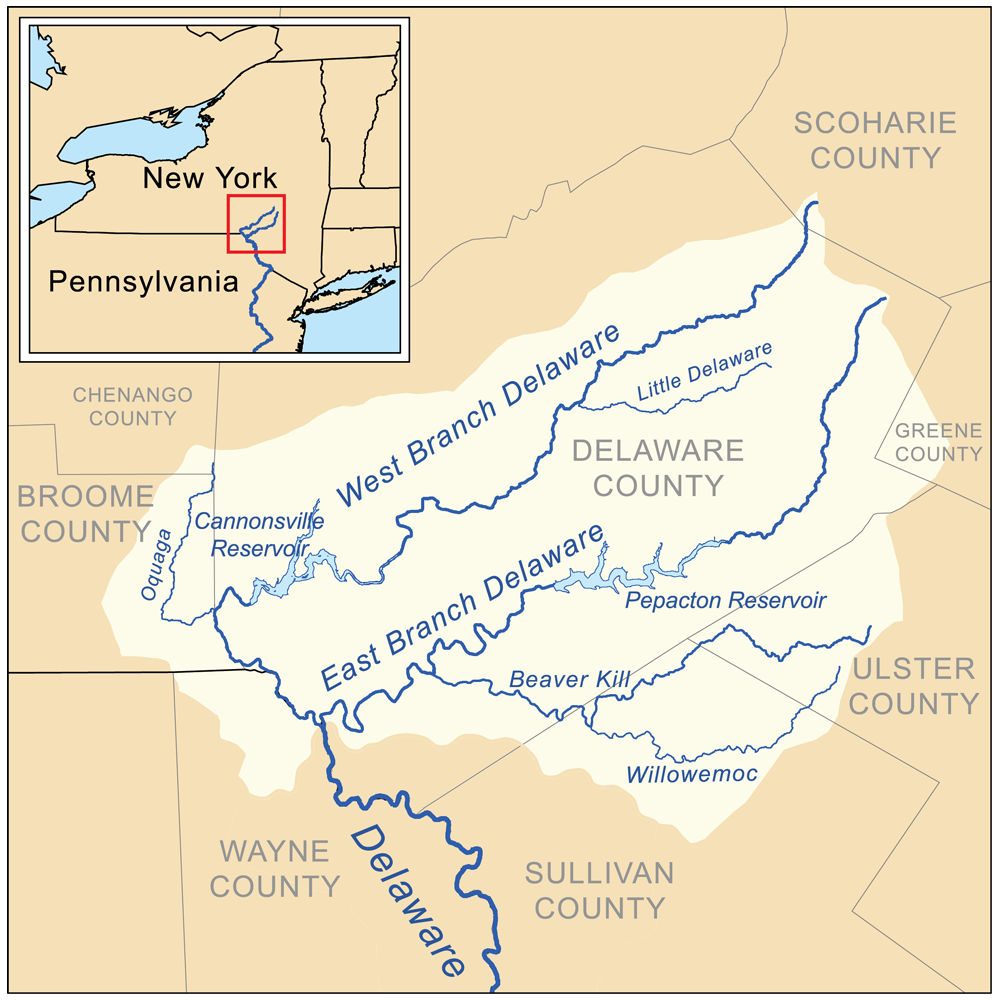
- Delaware Headwaters map showing Oquaga Creek

Location
- Country: United States
- State: New York
- Counties: Broome, Chenango

Physical characteristics
- Source
  - location: Broome County, New York
  - coordinates: 42°12′17″N 75°25′19″W
- Mouth: West Branch Delaware River
  - location: Deposit, New York, Broome County, New York, United States
  - coordinates: 42°03′28″N 75°25′22″W
  - elevation: 971 ft (296 m)
- Basin size: 67.6 sq mi (175 km^{2})

Basin features
- Tributaries
  - left: Tarbell Brook, Bone Creek
  - right: Dry Brook, Page Pond Brook, Marsh Creek, Fly Creek

Oquaga Creek is a river in Broome County and Chenango County in New York. It flows into the West Branch Delaware River by Deposit, New York.
