= Page Pond Hill =

Mountain in New York, United States

- Location within New York Location within the United States

Highest point
- Elevation: 2,008 feet (612 m)
- Coordinates: 42°08′51″N 75°29′44″W

Geography
- Location: NNW of Sanford, Broome County, New York, U.S.
- Topo map: USGS North Sanford

Page Pond Hill is a mountain in the Southern Tier of New York. It is located north-northwest of Sanford in Broome County. In 1935, a 79-foot-6-inch-tall (24.23 m) steel fire lookout tower was built on the mountain. The tower ceased fire lookout operations at the end of the 1988 fire lookout season, and later closed. The site is on private property and is not open to the public.

== History ==
In 1935, the Civilian Conservation Corps built a 79-foot-6-inch-tall (24.23 m) International Derrick steel fire lookout tower on the mountain. The tower first went into operation in 1936, reporting 12 fires and 29 visitors. The tower ceased fire lookout operations at the end of the 1988 fire lookout season. The New York State Department of Environmental Conservation officially closed the tower in early 1989. In June 1992, the tower was transferred to the landowner, the Girl Scouts Indian Hills Council. In 2007, the New York branch of the Forest Fire Lookout Association completed restoration work on the tower and the cabin. The site is on private property and is not open to the public.
