= Holy Islamville, South Carolina =

Unincorporated community in South Carolina, US

- Unincorporated community
- Location within South Carolina Location within the United States
- Coordinates: 35°3′27″N 81°10′33″W
- Country: United States
- State: South Carolina
- County: York
- Time zone: UTC-5 (Eastern (EST))
  - Summer (DST): UTC-4 (EDT)
- ZIP Code: 29745
- Area codes: 803 & 839

Holy Islamville, formerly known as Islamville, is an unincorporated community in York County, South Carolina, United States.

== History ==
=== Establishment ===
Islamville was established in 1983 by Muhyyudin Abdul Rauf, Kamal Shakir, Ali Abdul Rashid and Abdul Sabur. All were affiliated with the Muslims of America organization, headquartered in the all-Islamic community of Islamberg, New York. The four, all American-born Muslim reverts, left New York City at the behest of Sheikh Mubarak Ali Gilani, who told them to leave the city and establish a place that practices "real Islam."

We were basically located in the inner cities, impoverished ghettos and areas not conducive to Islam ... Sheikh Mubarik told us to move to a place where we could raise our children in a holy environment.

— Holy Islamville mayor Naafi A. Alim (2003)

Rashid and Sabur traveled southward along Interstate 85 and came across Charlotte, North Carolina, which they suggested as a potential area for their new community. When discussing the new location, Gilani supported the move, calling people in the South "God-fearing."

The pair found and bought the current plot of land, undeveloped, but found support by the local population of York County.

We couldn’t see anything but woods ... It was raw and we were all city people, so it was a lot of learning on all levels for us. But what we did, by the grace and mercy of Allah, the most kind, and following the instruction, and the guidance of our spiritual guide, we bought the property and we had local people who were willing to help us, which again, you know, cured a lot of angst that we all had in regards to being in the South, being African Americans, most of the members of our community here are African American.

— Kamal Shakir (2022)

Upon buying and developing the land, residents constructed a mosque and established a homeschooling system for its youth.

=== Miracles ===
The community was the site of two alleged instances of karamat. In 1996, during a ladies retreat, a rainbow appeared on the ceiling of a residence, before the word Allah (Arabic: الله) appeared above the stove. A similar event occurred the following year, including the names of Allah and the prophet Muhammad (Arabic: محمد), along with silhouettes of birds. A shrine, called the "House of Light" (Arabic: بيت النور), was established following the incident. In 2002, over 5,000 people visited the shrine. The community also changed its name from "Islamville" to "Holy Islamville" after the event, though some sources still refer to the community as "Islamville."

=== Media attention ===
Holy Islamville has attracted attention due to its all-Muslim population. After the 2015 San Bernardino attack, the York County sheriff's office fielded calls concerning the community, including fears that it served as an Islamic terrorist training camp. The office confirmed that these fears were unfounded, and has worked to bridge the divide between Muslims and non-Muslims in the county. During campaign season of the 2016 United States presidential election, the town was the subject of a piece from The Guardian about Donald Trump's anti-Islam rhetoric.

== Geography ==
Holy Islamville is a gated community of about 40 acres (0.16 km^{2}) in the woodland of western York County, South Carolina, about 8 miles (13 km) from the border with North Carolina and about 12 miles (19 km) south of the town of York. The Guardian described the community as "not so much a town as a collection of homes."

== Government ==
As of 2003, the community has a town council government, consisting of the mayor and four council members, with elections held every two years.

== Demographics ==
The residents of the community are all Muslim-practicing African Americans who were born in the United States.

In 2003, The Herald estimated that 100 residents lived in the community. The Guardian estimated that 300 people lived in Holy Islamville in 2016. Just three months prior, however, Queen City News estimated there were three families living in the community.

== See also ==
- Baladullah
- EPIC City, Texas
- Islamberg, New York
