= Deposit, New York =

- Town
- Location in the state of New York
- Coordinates: 42°03′36″N 75°25′41″W
- Country: United States
- State: New York
- County: Delaware

Government
  - Type: Town Council
  - Town Supervisor: Thomas A. Axtell (R)
  - Town Council: Members: • William J. Morley, Jr. (R); • Carl A. Clark (R); • Victor E. Davis (R); • Robert J. Carson (Late Comer)

Area
  - Total: 44.6 sq mi (115.5 km^{2})
  - Land: 43.0 sq mi (111.4 km^{2})
  - Water: 1.6 sq mi (4.1 km^{2})
- Elevation: 990 ft (300 m)

Population (2020)
  - Total: 1,427
- Time zone: UTC-5 (Eastern (EST))
  - Summer (DST): UTC-4 (EDT)
- ZIP Codes: 13754 (Deposit); 13783 (Hancock)
- Area code: 607
- FIPS code: 36-025-20357
- GNIS feature ID: 978899
- Website: townofdepositny.gov

Deposit is a town in Delaware County, New York, United States. As of the 2020 census, the town's population was 1,427.

The town of Deposit is on the western border of the county. It contains a village also named Deposit, the western portion of which is located in the adjacent town of Sanford in Broome County. Its slogan is "Gateway to the Catskills".

== History ==
The town name was derived from the deposits of logs made by lumbermen, prior to forming rafts to float down the Delaware River; usually to Philadelphia. The Town of Deposit was organized in 1880 from the western part of the town of Tompkins.

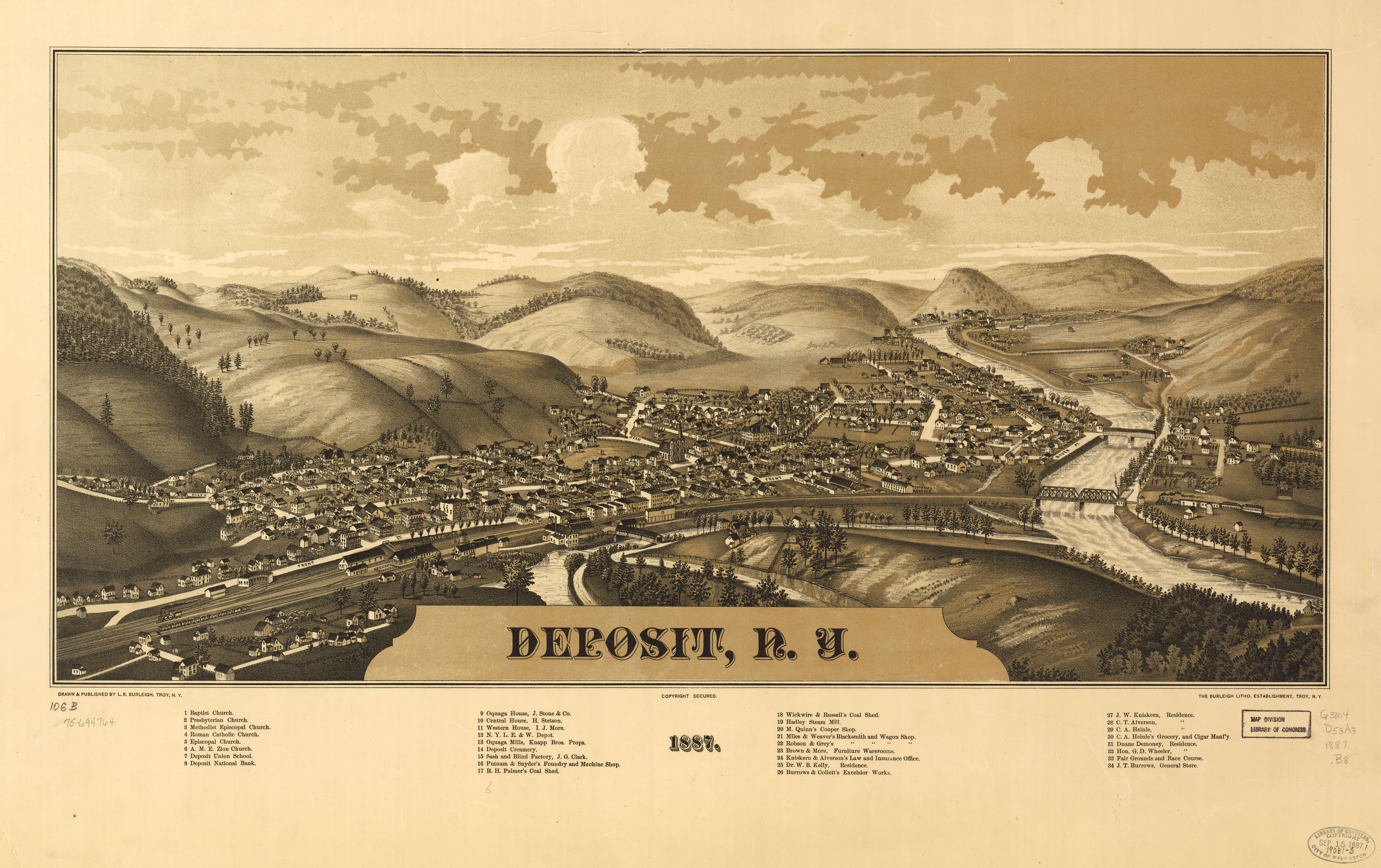
Perspective map and list of landmarks from 1887 by L.R. Burleigh

In the 1890s, Deposit was a center of publishing with the relocation of the Outing Publishing Company to the town (from New York). Several magazines, including The Bohemian, were published and printed from Deposit. The Outing Publishing Company went out of business a few years after the failure of the Knapp Bros. Bank in 1909. Charles J. Knapp was president of Outing and on the board of Knapp Brothers, which was run by his nephew, Charles P. Knapp.

== Geography ==
The western town line is the border of Broome County. The village is located at the confluence of Oquaga Creek and the West Branch of the Delaware River. The Southern Tier Expressway (NY 17) follows the western town boundary.

The southern end of New York State Route 8 is at NY 17 just south of the village of Deposit.

According to the United States Census Bureau, the town has a total area of 44.6 square miles (115.5 km^{2}), of which 43.0 square miles (111.4 km^{2}) is land and 1.6 square miles (4.1 km^{2}), or 3.51%, is water.

== Demographics ==
Historical population
Census	Pop.	Note	%±
1880	1,714		—
1890	1,664		−2.9%
1900	1,747		5.0%
1910	1,641		−6.1%
1920	1,415		−13.8%
1930	1,469		3.8%
1940	1,443		−1.8%
1950	1,570		8.8%
1960	1,560		−0.6%
1970	1,656		6.2%
1980	1,810		9.3%
1990	1,824		0.8%
2000	1,687		−7.5%
2010	1,712		1.5%
2020	1,427		−16.6%
U.S. Decennial Census

As of the census of 2000, there were 1,687 people, 700 households, and 445 families residing in the town. The population density was 39.2 inhabitants per square mile (15.1/km^{2}). There were 1,048 housing units at an average density of 24.4 units per square mile (9.4 units/km^{2}). The racial makeup of the town was 97.27% White, 1.30% African American, 0.18% Native American, 0.47% Asian, 0.06% Pacific Islander, 0.18% from other races, and 0.53% from two or more races. Hispanic or Latino of any race were 1.13% of the population.

There were 700 households, out of which 31.3% had children under the age of 18 living with them, 47.6% were married couples living together, 10.6% had a female householder with no partner present, and 36.3% were non-families. 31.6% of all households were made up of individuals, and 17.6% had someone living alone who was 65 years of age or older. The average household size was 2.41 and the average family size was 2.99.

In the town, the population was spread out, with 26.4% under the age of 18, 8.6% from 18 to 24, 25.1% from 25 to 44, 22.6% from 45 to 64, and 17.4% who were 65 years of age or older. The median age was 38 years. For every 100 females, there were 91.1 males. For every 100 females age 18 and over, there were 85.9 males.

The median income for a household in the town was $28,750, and the median income for a family was $35,536. Males had a median income of $27,434 versus $20,602 for females. The per capita income for the town was $15,068. About 11.5% of families and 15.8% of the population were below the poverty line, including 26.3% of those under age 18 and 8.3% of those age 65 or over.

== Cannonsville Reservoir ==
The Cannonsville Reservoir, which supplies the New York City water system, is located on the West Branch of the Delaware River, 3 miles (5 km) upstream (east) of Deposit. The hamlet of Cannonsville and several others were submerged by the reservoir.

== Communities and locations in the Town of Deposit ==
- Barbourville — A hamlet near the eastern town line on Route 8.
- China — A hamlet in the northern part of the town on Route 20.
- Cannonsville Reservoir — The western part of the reservoir and its dam are east of the Deposit village.
- Deposit — The eastern section of the Village of Deposit is located north of the Southern Tier Expressway.
- Hale Eddy — A hamlet in the southern part of the town.
- Hambletville — A hamlet northeast of Deposit on Route 8.
- Stilesville — A hamlet northeast of Deposit on Route 8.
- Upper Barbourville — A hamlet in the northeastern corner of the town on Route 8.
