= Badger, California =

Unincorporated community in California, United States

Coordinates: 36°37′53″N 119°00′47″W

Badger is an unincorporated community located in Tulare County, California, United States at an elevation of 3,038 feet. It has a population of 140. The zip code is 93603 and the area code 559. It is normally reached by California State Route 245.

== History ==
In the 1970s and the 1980s, the controversial organization Synanon operated a residential compound on nearby Dry Creek Road. Badger was in the national news in October 1978 when the Los Angeles Police Department served a search warrant at this site in connection with a deliberate rattlesnake attack on attorney Paul Morantz who was critical of the organization. An African-American Muslim community named Baladullah occupied the former Synanon site from 1989 through 2002. In 2020, the local newspaper reported that the former compound of the cult will become vacation rentals.

== Government ==
In the California State Legislature, Badger is the 12th Senate District, represented by Republican Shannon Grove and in the 32nd Assembly District, represented by Republican Vince Fong.

In the United States House of Representatives, Badger is in California's vacant 20th Congressional District, previously represented by the former Republican Speaker of the House, Kevin McCarthy. McCarthy resigned from Congress after his removal as Speaker of the House on October 3rd, 2023.

== Education ==
Badger is served by the Cutler-Orosi Unified School District.

== In popular culture ==
Badger was featured in an early 1970s McDonald's commercial in which it is claimed that a Visalia McDonald's served the entire population of the town for US$12.61. The population was 15 at the time of filming this commercial.
