= Clarks Pond =

- Location of Clarks Pond within New York
- Location: Delaware County, New York
- Coordinates: 42°10′17″N 75°24′35″W
- Type: Lake
- Primary outflows: Cold Spring Creek
- Surface area: 2 acres (0.0031 mi^{2}; 0.81 ha)
- Surface elevation: 1,795 feet (547 m)
- Settlements: Masonville

Clarks Pond is a small lake located south-southeast of the hamlet of Masonville in Delaware County, New York. Clarks Pond drains south via Cold Spring Creek which flows into the West Branch Delaware River.

== See also ==
- List of lakes in New York
