= Bone Creek (New York) =

Location
- Country: United States
- State: New York

Physical characteristics
- Source
  - location: Broome County, New York
- Mouth: Oquaga Creek
  - location: Deposit, New York, Broome County, New York, United States
  - coordinates: 42°03′41″N 75°26′10″W
- Basin size: 1.38 mi^{2} (3.6 km^{2})

Bone Creek flows into the Oquaga Creek by Deposit, New York.
