= Trout Creek (Cannonsville Reservoir tributary) =

- Location of the mouth of Trout Creek

Location
- Country: United States
- State: New York
- County: Delaware

Physical characteristics
- Source
  - coordinates: 42°15′23″N 75°14′48″W
- Mouth: Cannonsville Reservoir
  - coordinates: 42°05′24″N 75°19′23″W
  - elevation: 1,148 ft (350 m)

Basin features
- Tributaries
  - left: Bullock Brook
  - right: West Branch Trout Creek

Trout Creek is a river in Delaware County, New York. It flows into Cannonsville Reservoir northeast of Stilesville.
