= Hale Eddy, New York =

- Hamlet
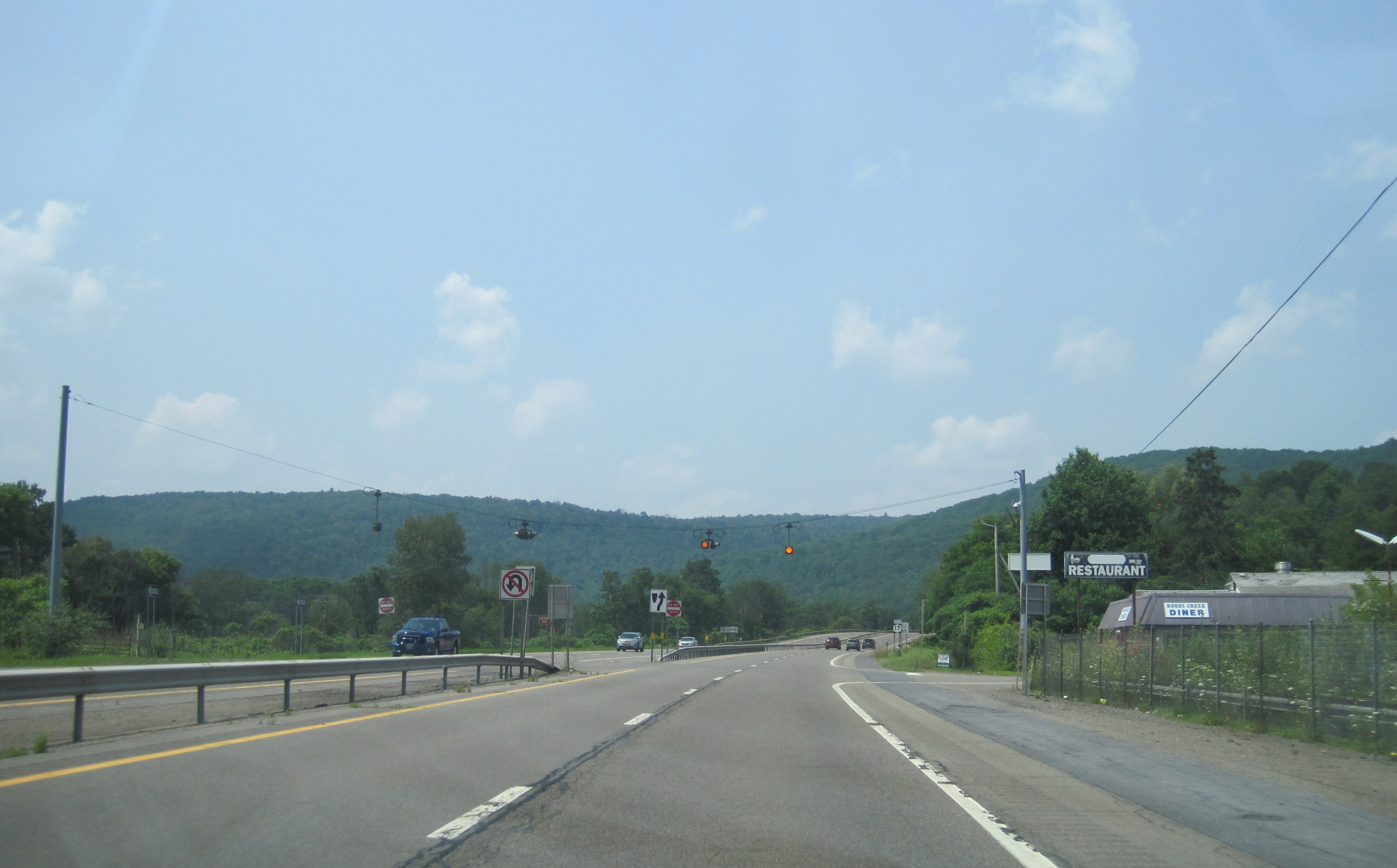
- Westbound NY 17 at the Silver Lake Road intersection

- Location within the state of New York
- Coordinates: 42°00′13″N 75°22′59″W
- Country: United States
- State: New York
- County: Delaware
- Town: Deposit
- Elevation: 974 ft (297 m)
- Time zone: UTC-5 (Eastern (EST))
  - Summer (DST): UTC-4 (EDT)

Hale Eddy is a hamlet in Delaware County, New York, United States. It is located south-southeast of Deposit on New York State Route 17 (NY 17). At-grade intersections occur along NY 17 through Hale Eddy though the highway is otherwise a freeway on either side of the hamlet. The West Branch Delaware River flows east through the hamlet.
