= Baladullah =

African-American Muslim community in California, U.S.

Baladullah was an African-American Muslim enclave in the Sierra Nevada foothills of California. It was founded in the mid-1990s, inspired by Shaykh Gilani, and closed in 2002.

== History ==
Location of former Baladullah enclave

The 440-acre (180 ha) parcel which became Baladulla was once part of a 3,400-acre (1,400 ha) property owned by Synanon, a cult originally established as a drug rehabilitation program. The Tulare County property was one of a few remote rehabilitation centers the group utilized. The parcel sits on California 245, just a mile past the small, unincorporated community of Badger, California in the mountains near Sequoia National Forest. During their time on the property in the 1960s, Synanon built an airport and a shooting range. The site was also used as a Baptist youth camp.

The name Baladulla is variously translated to "City of God" or "Allah's City," the latter of which appeared on a sign above the entry gate. The enclave was founded in 1989 by Khadijah Ghafur, a Muslim convert and also an educator in the Fresno area, along with her husband Khadijah Baqi. Ghafur, born as Deanna Moton, was raised in Selma, Alabama and at age 14 she was arrested during a civil rights demonstration there. Ghafur studied and followed the teachings of Shaykh Gilani, a Pakistani cleric who founded the tax-exempt Muslims of America in 1980. When asked about her motivation to start Baladullah, Ghafur said "Sheikh Jilani urged urban Muslims to abandon what he called the 'welfare mentality,' move out of inner-city ghettos and set self-sustaining communities of Muslim families in rural areas." Ghafur and Baqi leased the site and soon there were several dozen people living in the cabins. However, problems arose including neighbors hearing gunfire on the property and numerous building and safety code violations. By 1993, the group had fallen months behind on the rent but they maintained residence there.

In 1998, Ghafur utilized her background as an educator and impressed Fresno school officials with her plans for a charter school serving low-income families. Ghafur opened the first Gateway Academy charter school in Fresno in 2000 and in less than a year, Ghafur had built an empire of a dozen campuses around the state. Local authorities began a probe into Gateway schools, assessing that they were deeply in debt, failed to keep adequate records and allowed the teaching of religion in two of its 11 branches. Balaullah came under even more scrutiny when a 20-year old resident shot and killed a Fresno County Sheriff's Deputy investigating a burglary call.

The September 11 attacks occurred shortly after the shooting of the Sheriff's Deputy and ignited even more scrutiny of Muslim organizations in the United States. Another Baladullah resident, James Hobson, was arrested in 2001 at the Gateway Academy in Fresno for his part in smuggling guns between South Carolina and New York. In 2002, in the midst of numerous investigations, the community was described as dissolving, with "everything must go" signs being posted. The Gateway school charter was revoked and Ghafur was ultimately convicted of stealing money from the program.

Population estimates of the enclave ranged from 100 to 400 people. The property was purchased by a development organization in 2004 and is now a resort.
