= Bone Creek (West Virginia) =

River in Ritchie County, West Virginia

Coordinates: 39°07′15″N 80°57′32″W

Bone Creek is a stream located entirely within Ritchie County, West Virginia.

Bone Creek was descriptively named for the animal bones discovered along its course. The animals were attracted to a salt lick.

== See also ==
- List of rivers of West Virginia
