= East Branch Cold Spring Creek =

- Location of the mouth of East Branch Cold Spring Creek

Location
- Country: United States
- State: New York
- County: Delaware

Physical characteristics
- Source: Beales Pond
  - coordinates: 42°12′01″N 75°22′45″W
  - elevation: 1,640 ft (500 m)
- Mouth: Cold Spring Creek
  - coordinates: 42°05′49″N 75°23′44″W
  - elevation: 1,050 ft (320 m)

Basin features
- Tributaries
  - left: Steam Mill Branch

East Branch Cold Spring Creek is a river in Delaware County, New York. It drains Beales Pond and converges with Cold Spring Creek north of Stilesville.
