= Mubarak Ali Gilani =

Pakistani Sufi leader (1936–2021)

Mubarak Ali Shah Gillani (15 August 1936 – 15 May 2021) was a Pakistani Sufi religious leader in the United States. A member of the Qadiriyya tariqa, he was the founder of The Muslims of America (TMOA) and also founded the International Qur'anic Open University (IQOU).

With full titles his name appears as El-Sheikh Syed Mubarak Ali Shah Gillani Hashimi.

== Early life and education ==
Mubarak Ali Shah Gillani was the eldest son of Pir Maqsood Shah Gilani, having two brothers and four sisters. His family were the historical caretakers and custodians of the Mian Mir shrine in Lahore.

He graduated from the University of the Punjab, where he founded the Adventure Club for climbers and mountaineers.

== Political career ==
In the 1970s, Gilani was active in Pakistan's national politics, having joined Air Marshal Asghar Khan’s Tehreek-i-Istaqlal, becoming the party's Punjab chapter vice president. Due to his political involvement, he was arrested twice by the Zulfikar Ali Bhutto Government, pushing him to move to Saudi Arabia before shifting to the United States.

== The Muslims of America ==
The Muslims of America, Inc. (TMOA) was founded in 1980 by Gilani during his seven years in the United States during which he sought to establish Islam in America. Among other projects, TMOA has communities in the town of Hancock, New York, called Islamberg and in York County, South Carolina, called Holy Islamville. A community in the Sierra Nevada foothills of California, called Baladullah, existed from 1989 to 2002.

== Publications ==
In 1978, Gilani published An Introduction to Quranic Psychology, which detailed, according to him, proofs upon scientific evidence and witnessing about using the Qur'an and religious observance to cure certain mental disorders. This was followed up by his An Introduction to Psychiatry: Based on Teaching of the Quran and also Contains Results of Scientific Demonstration of Curing Incurable Mental Diseases in the Psychiatric Institute, Taif, Saudi Arabia, 1976–1977 published in 1981.

In 1983, he published an edited and revised edition of Rauzatus-Safa, an influential 15th century Islamic history volume set beginning with the creation of the Jinn and Adam and going all the way up to the Temurid dynasty. Rauzatus-Safa was additionally edited, revised, and re-published in hardcover in 2014.

== Later life and death ==
After living in the United States Gilani returned to Pakistan, where he continued to be recognized as a healer and spiritual guide. On 15 May 2021, Gilani died in Lahore from a stroke and underlying health conditions. He was survived by eight sons, three daughters and two wives.
