= Islamberg, New York =

- Hamlet
- Nickname: Holy Islamberg
- Location of Islamberg in New York
- Coordinates: 42°03′08″N 75°20′06″W
- Country: United States
- State: New York
- County: Delaware
- Town: Tompkins

Population
  - Total: 200

Islamberg (Arabic: إسلامبيرج) is a rural hamlet and religious community in the town of Tompkins, Delaware County, New York, United States.

== History ==
Islamberg was settled by a group of mostly black Muslim families in the 1980s, who sought to escape the urban decline of New York City. The group was inspired by Sufi Cleric Sheikh Syed Mubarik Ali Shah Gilani and sought a more "peaceful and holy Muslim life". Islamberg has a population of about 200, along with its own grocery store, bookstore, and school. The community serves as the headquarters of Muslims of America, which seeks to promote an understanding of Islam.

== Public safety ==
Although relations with neighboring communities are cooperative, Islamberg has repeatedly faced threats and persecution originating from false right-wing conspiracy theories spread online. Right-wing groups such as InfoWars have claimed that Islamberg is a training center for terrorists, claims which local law enforcement and state police investigators say are untrue.

In November 2015, Jon Ritzheimer, of Phoenix, Arizona, made news for threatening an attack on Islamberg. In June 2017, a Tennessee man, Robert Doggart, was sentenced to almost 20 years in prison for plotting an attack on Islamberg. In January 2019, three men and one male minor were arrested for plotting an attack on Islamberg with explosives. Police found 23 firearms and three homemade bombs that investigators claim were going to be used to attack the hamlet.

== See also ==
- Holy Islamville, South Carolina
- Kiryas Joel
- Baladullah
