= Tompkins, New York =

Town in Delaware County, New York, US

- Town
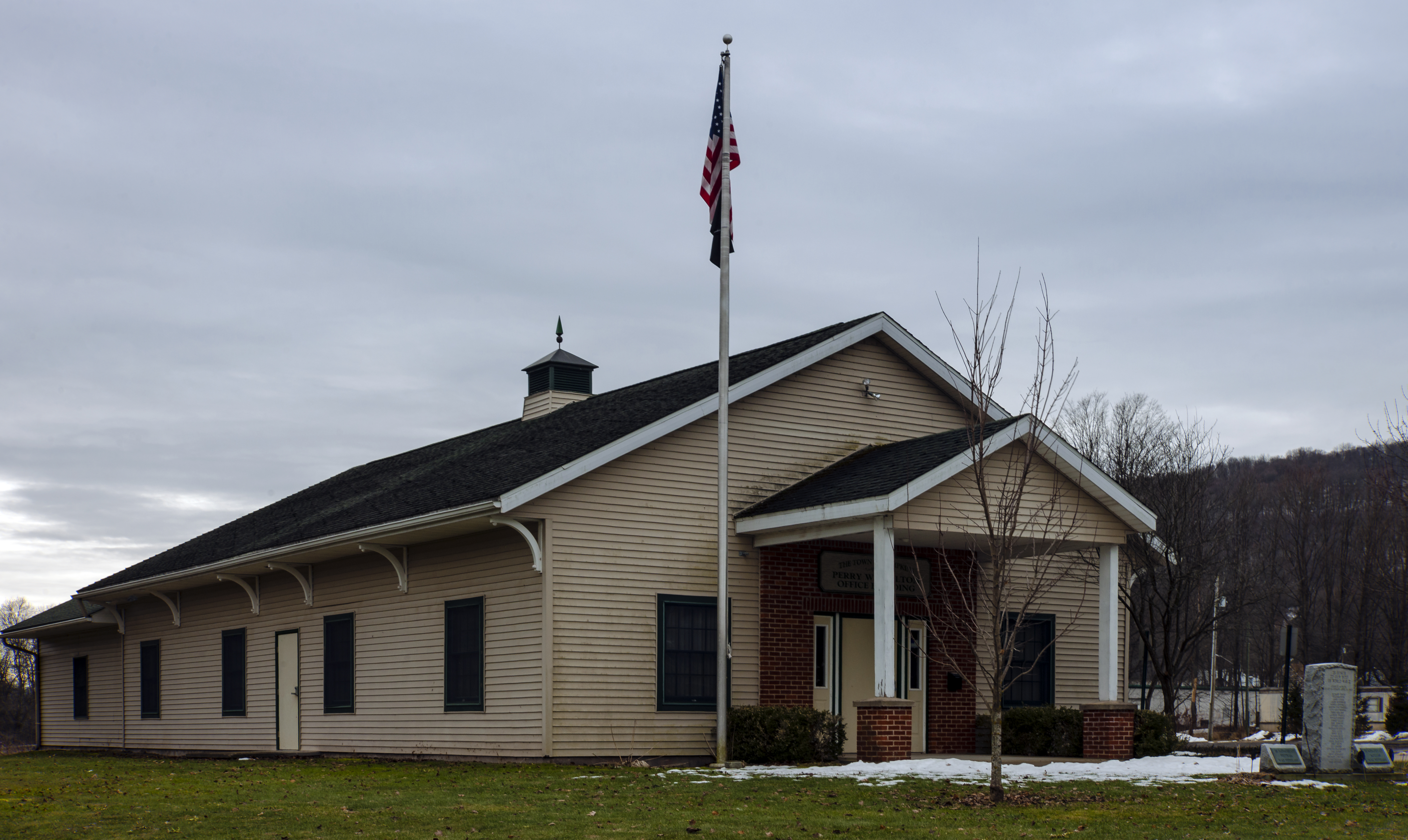
- Town hall, in Trout Creek

- Location within the state of New York
- Coordinates: 42°7′6″N 75°14′58″W
- Country: United States
- State: New York
- County: Delaware

Government
  - Type: Town Council
  - Town Supervisor: William Layton (D, R)
  - Town Council: Members' List: • Howard Buttell (R); • Peggy Backus (R); • Timothy LaTourette (R); • Carl Stuendel (R)

Area
  - Total: 104.45 sq mi (270.52 km^{2})
  - Land: 98.13 sq mi (254.16 km^{2})
  - Water: 6.31 sq mi (16.35 km^{2})
- Elevation: 1,155 ft (352 m)

Population (2020)
  - Total: 1,290
- Time zone: UTC-5 (Eastern (EST))
  - Summer (DST): UTC-4 (EDT)
- ZIP Codes: 13847 (Trout Creek); 13839 (Sidney Center); 13856 (Walton); 13783 (Hancock); 13756 (East Branch)
- FIPS code: 36-025-74111
- GNIS feature ID: 0979549
- Website: townoftompkins.org

Tompkins is a town in Delaware County, New York, United States. The population was 1,290 at the 2020 census. The town is named after Daniel D. Tompkins, the fourth governor of New York and sixth vice president of the United States.

The town is in the western part of the county.

== History ==
The town was formed in 1806 from part of the town of Franklin. The western part of the town was lost to form the town of Deposit in 1880.

== Geography ==
According to the United States Census Bureau, Tompkins has a total area of 104.4 square miles (270.5 km^{2}), of which 98.1 square miles (254.2 km^{2}) is land and 6.3 square miles (16.4 km^{2}), or 6.05%, is water. The Cannonsville Reservoir on the West Branch Delaware River crosses the center of the town.

== Demographics ==
Historical population
Census	Pop.	Note	%±
1820	1,206		—
1830	1,774		47.1%
1840	2,035		14.7%
1850	3,022		48.5%
1860	3,589		18.8%
1870	4,046		12.7%
1880	2,534		−37.4%
1890	2,626		3.6%
1900	2,482		−5.5%
1910	2,127		−14.3%
1920	1,737		−18.3%
1930	1,665		−4.1%
1940	1,642		−1.4%
1950	1,680		2.3%
1960	1,463		−12.9%
1970	905		−38.1%
1980	968		7.0%
1990	994		2.7%
2000	1,105		11.2%
2010	1,247		12.9%
2020	1,290		3.4%
U.S. Decennial Census

As of the census of 2000, there were 1,105 people, 445 households, and 315 families residing in the town. The population density was 11.2 inhabitants per square mile (4.3/km^{2}). There were 768 housing units at an average density of 7.8 per square mile (3.0/km^{2}). The racial makeup of the town was 98.55% White, 0.81% African American, 0.09% Native American, 0.09% from other races, and 0.45% from two or more races. Hispanic or Latino of any race were 1.18% of the population.

There were 445 households, out of which 28.5% had children under the age of 18 living with them, 58.2% were married couples living together, 6.5% had a female householder with no husband present, and 29.2% were non-families. 24.5% of all households were made up of individuals, and 11.9% had someone living alone who was 65 years of age or older. The average household size was 2.46 and the average family size was 2.90.

In the town, the population was spread out, with 23.1% under the age of 18, 5.7% from 18 to 24, 25.3% from 25 to 44, 29.0% from 45 to 64, and 16.8% who were 65 years of age or older. The median age was 42 years. For every 100 females, there were 103.5 males. For every 100 females age 18 and over, there were 101.9 males.

The median income for a household in the town was $35,227, and the median income for a family was $38,583. Males had a median income of $27,833 versus $19,087 for females. The per capita income for the town was $16,507. About 7.3% of families and 8.9% of the population were below the poverty line, including 6.4% of those under age 18 and 17.3% of those age 65 or over.

== Communities and locations in Tompkins ==
- Apex – a hamlet located west-southwest of Rock Rift
- Cannonsville Reservoir – a reservoir on the West Branch Delaware River.
- Cleaver – a hamlet located north-northwest of Rock Rift
- Islamberg – a hamlet near Deposit founded by Syed Mubarik Ali Shah Gilani
- Kelsey – a hamlet located southwest of Apex.
- Rock Rift – a hamlet located east of Cannonsville Reservoir
- Trout Creek – a hamlet located northwest of Cleaver
