= Cold Spring Creek =

Location
- Country: United States
- State: New York
- Counties: Delaware

Physical characteristics
- Source: Clarks Pond
  - location: N of Stilesville
  - coordinates: 42°10′14″N 75°24′36″W
  - elevation: 1,795 ft (547 m)
- Mouth: West Branch Delaware River
  - location: Stilesville
  - coordinates: 42°04′51″N 75°24′08″W
  - elevation: 988 ft (301 m)
- Basin size: 30.7 mi^{2} (80 km^{2})

Basin features
- Tributaries
  - left: East Branch Cold Spring Creek
  - right: Cabin Brook

Cold Spring Creek is a river in Delaware County, New York. It originates from Clarks Pond and flows south before converging with the West Branch Delaware River in Stilesville.
