= Cannonsville Reservoir =

Reservoir in Delaware County, New York

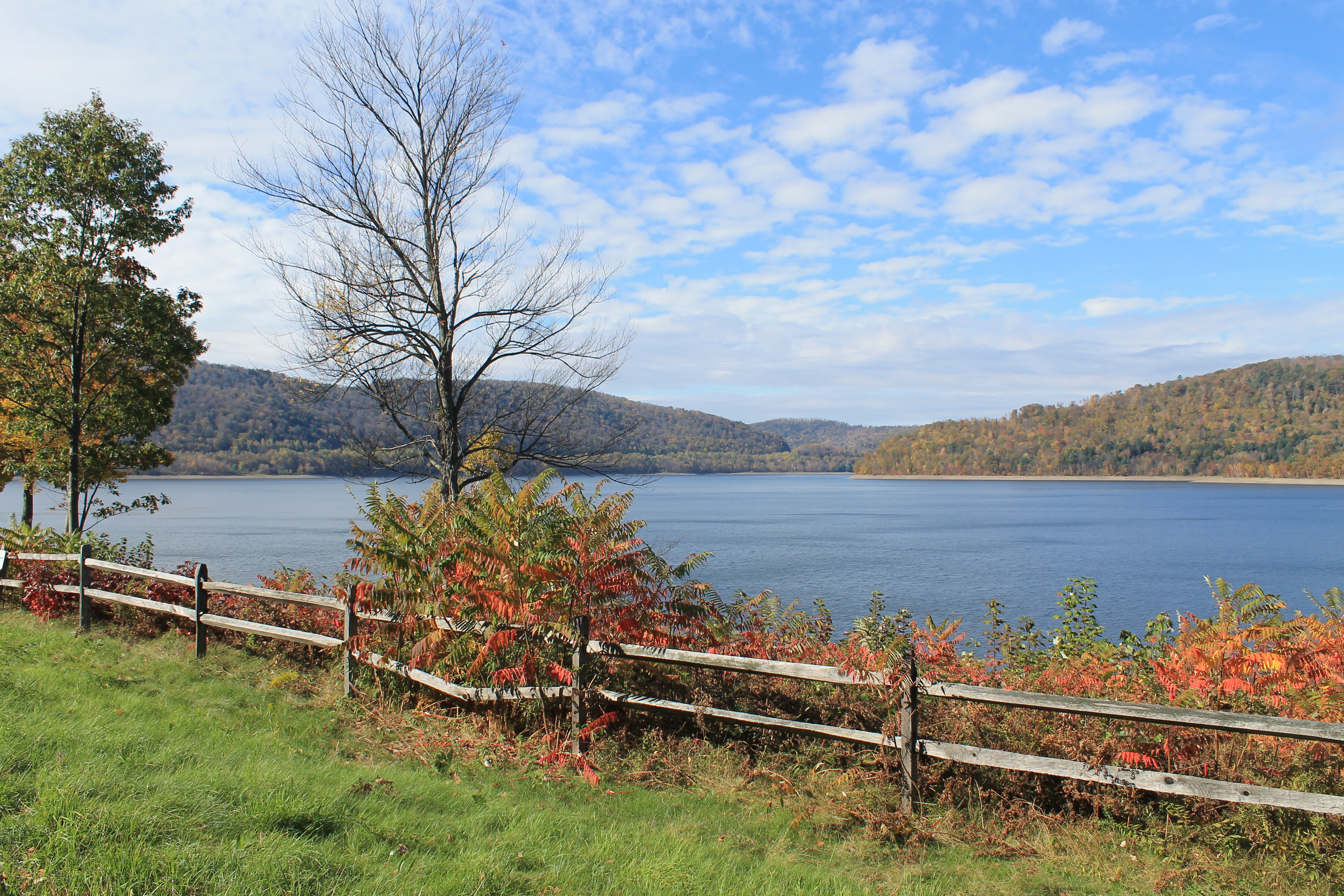
- Cannonsville Reservoir from Sands Creek Road in Hancock

- Location within New York Cannonsville Reservoir (the United States)
- Location: Delaware County, New York
- Coordinates: 42°06′41″N 75°16′21″W, 42°07′50″N 75°17′50″W, 42°04′59″N 75°12′30″W, 42°04′05″N 75°22′35″W
- Type: Reservoir
- Primary inflows: West Branch Delaware River
- Primary outflows: West Branch Delaware River, West Delaware Tunnel
- Catchment area: 455 sq mi (1,180 km^{2})
- Basin countries: United States
- Water volume: 95.7 billion U.S. gallons (362 million cubic meters)
- Surface elevation: 1,148 feet (350 m)

The Cannonsville Reservoir is a reservoir in the New York City water supply system in Delaware County, New York. It was formed by construction of the Cannonsville Dam on its west end, which impounded over half of the West Branch of the Delaware River. Lying on the western part of the Delaware Watershed, it is the westernmost of New York City's reservoirs. It was placed in service in 1964, and is the most recently constructed reservoir in the New York City system.

The town of Cannonsvile was destroyed to make room for the reservoir, which lies within the towns of Tompkins and Deposit.

Its 455 mi^{2} (1,180 km^{2}) drainage basin is the largest of all of the NYC reservoirs. Capacity is 95.7 billion US gallons (362,000,000 m^{3}). Water from the reservoir flows through the 44-mile (71 km) West Delaware Tunnel into the Rondout Reservoir, before joining the 85-mile (137 km) Delaware Aqueduct, which provides New York City with about 50% of its drinking water.

The Delaware Aqueduct then crosses beneath the Hudson River and continues on to the West Branch Reservoir in Putnam County, New York, then the Kensico Reservoir in Westchester County. It then continues south to the Hillview Reservoir in Yonkers, where it joins the flows of the Catskill and New Croton aqueducts for distribution through the New York City tunnel system.

The Cannonsville Dam is being considered as a site for a 14.08MW hydroelectric generating station.

== Recreation ==
No motor boats are allowed on the reservoir; non-motorized boats that have been steam-cleaned and that have required tags may be used in the reservoir during the summer.

== Tributaries ==
- Johnny Brook
- Dry Brook
- Sherruck Brook
- Trout Creek
- Loomis Brook
- Chamberlain Brook
- Dryden Brook
- Maxwell Brook
- Fish Brook

== Gallery ==
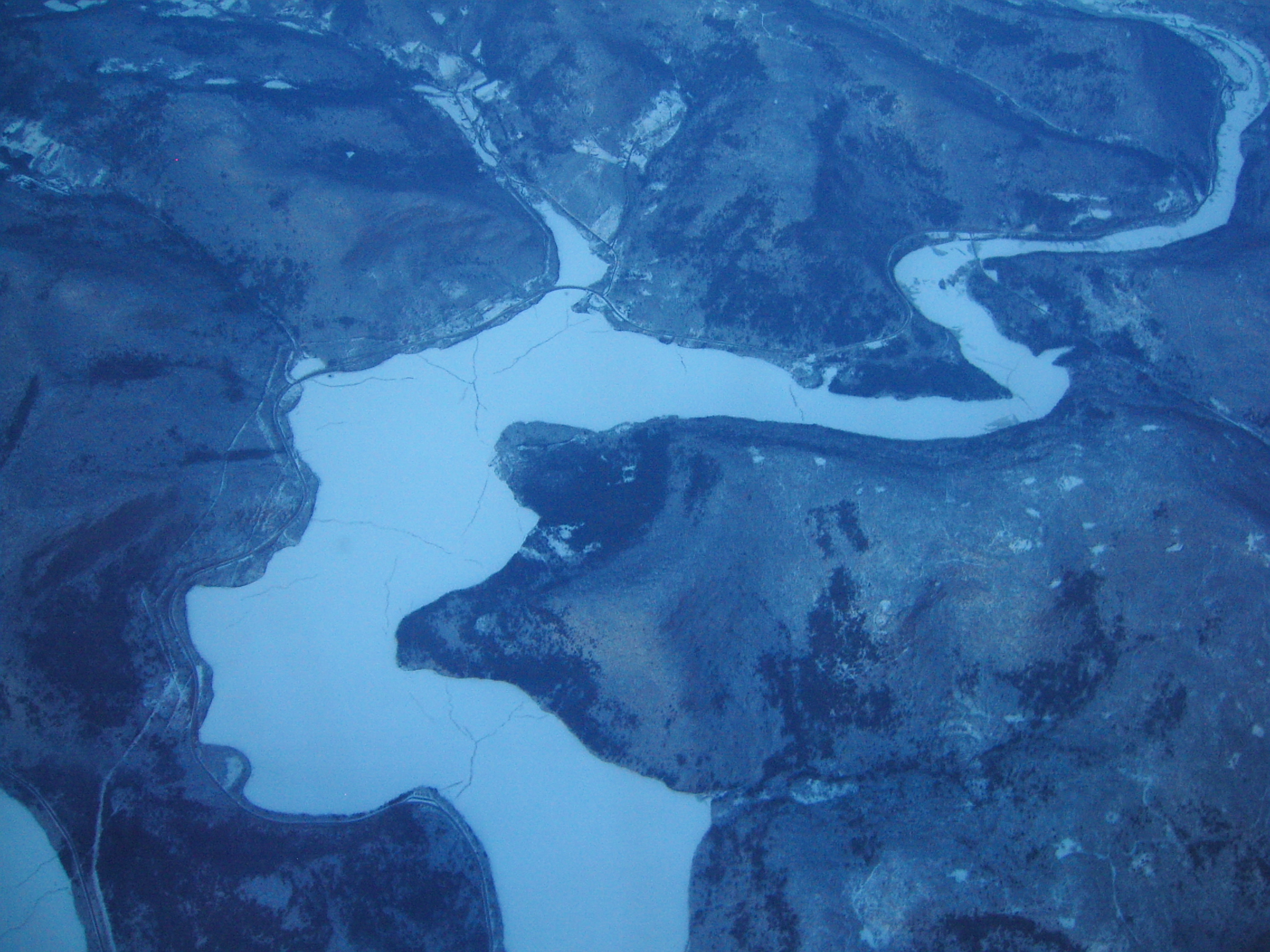
Aerial view of Cannonsville Reservoir

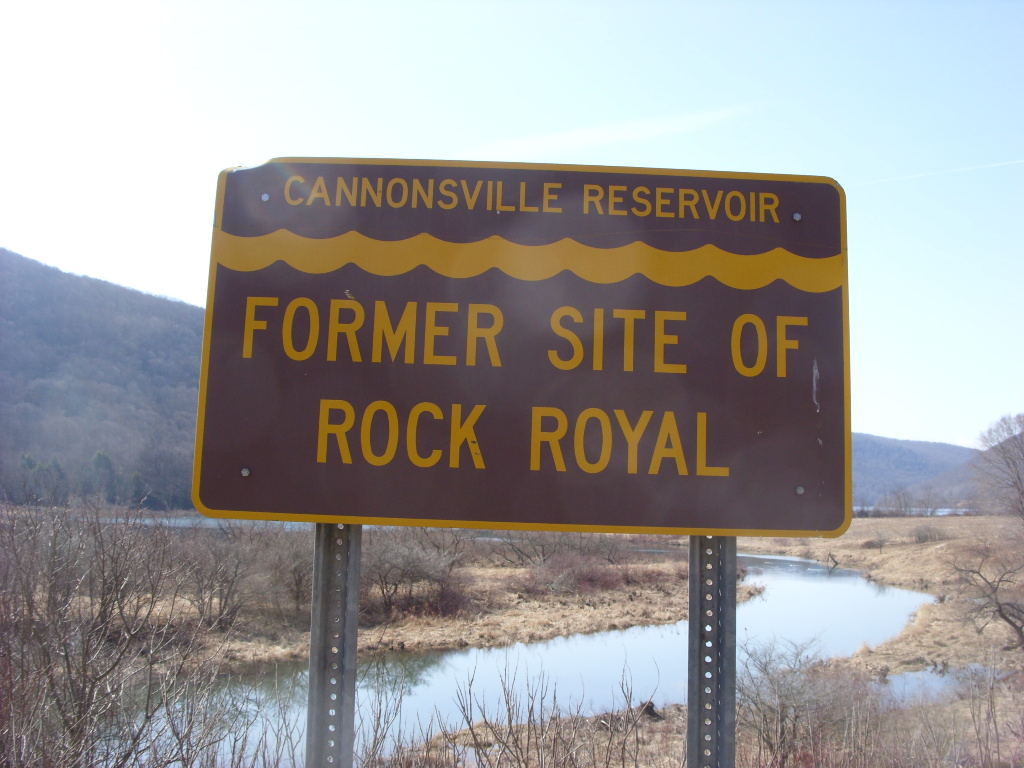
Signage denoting the former site of Rock Royal

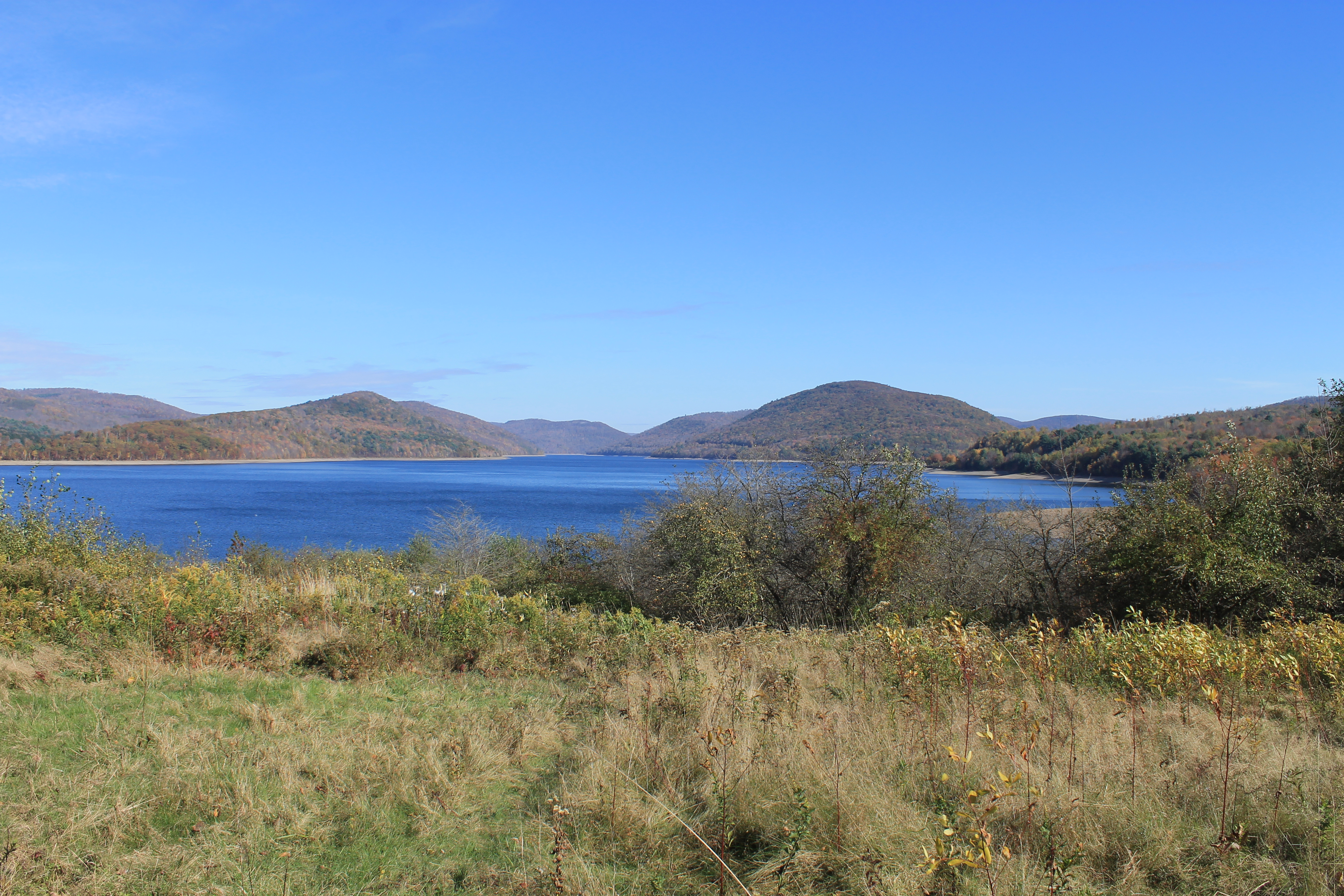
Cannonsville Reservoir at Deposit

== See also ==
- List of reservoirs and dams in New York
