= Trout Creek, New York =

- Hamlet
- Location within New York Location within the United States
- Coordinates: 42°12′13″N 75°16′46″W
- Country: United States
- State: New York
- County: Delaware
- Elevation: 1,289 ft (393 m)
- Time zone: UTC-5 (Eastern (EST))
  - Summer (DST): UTC-4 (EDT)
- ZIP code: 13847
- Area code: 607
- GNIS feature ID: 967872

Trout Creek is a hamlet within the town of Tompkins in Delaware County, New York, United States. The community is located along New York State Route 206, 8 miles (13 km) west-northwest of Walton. Trout Creek has a post office with ZIP code 13847, which opened on June 21, 1847.
