= Sanford, New York =

- Town
- Logo

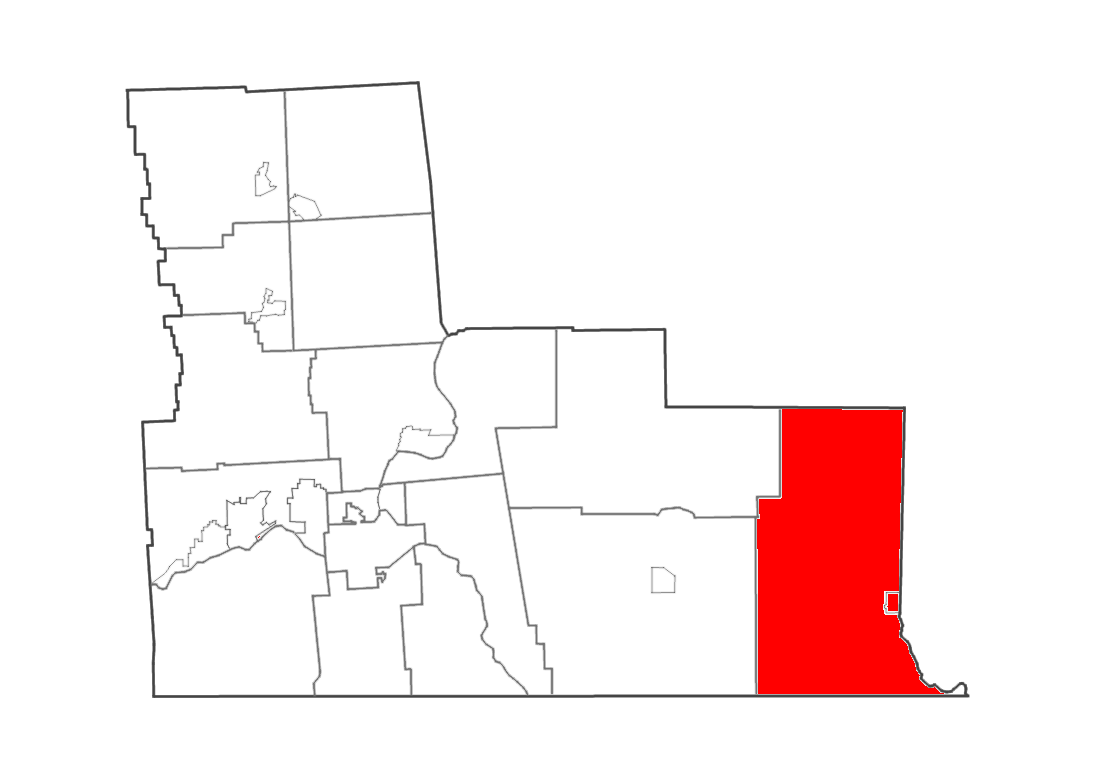
- Location in Broome County

- Location within New York Location within the United States
- Coordinates: 42°4′52″N 75°28′46″W
- Country: United States
- State: New York
- County: Broome

Government
  - Type: Town Council
  - Town Supervisor: Kenneth Wist
  - Town Council: Members' List: • Jay V. Vandermark; • Alice J. Ray; • Shane Lester; • Dan Andresen

Area
  - Total: 91.02 sq mi (235.75 km^{2})
  - Land: 90.10 sq mi (233.35 km^{2})
  - Water: 0.92 sq mi (2.39 km^{2})
- Elevation: 1,150 ft (350 m)

Population (2010)
  - Total: 2,407
  - Estimate (2016): 2,367
  - Density: 26.3/sq mi (10.14/km^{2})
- Time zone: UTC-5 (Eastern (EST))
  - Summer (DST): UTC-4 (EDT)
- ZIP Codes: 13754 (Deposit); 13730 (Afton); 13783 (Hancock); 13813 (Nineveh); 13865 (Windsor)
- Area code: 607
- FIPS code: 36-65112
- GNIS feature ID: 979457
- Website: townofsanfordny.gov

Sanford is a town in Broome County, New York, United States. The population was 2,407 at the 2010 census.

The town is on the eastern border of the county and the southern border of the state of New York. Sanford is east of Binghamton.

== History ==
Early ownership of the area was primarily divided into the Livingstone patent, the Fisher and Norton tract, and the Randolph patent. The region was first settled circa 1787.

The town of Sanford was formed in 1821 from the town of Windsor.

== Geography ==
According to the United States Census Bureau, the town has a total area of 91.0 square miles (235.7 km^{2}), of which 90.1 square miles (233.4 km^{2}) is land and 0.93 square miles (2.4 km^{2}), or 1.01%, is water.

The eastern town line is the border of Delaware County, the northern town boundary is the border of Chenango County, and the southern town line is the border of Pennsylvania, bordering Wayne and Susquehanna counties.

New York Route 17 crosses the town. New York State Route 41 intersects NY-17 west of McClure. The part of NY-17 near Deposit was one of the last sections to be completed in this part of New York, forcing travelers to exit at Deposit.

The West Branch of the Delaware River forms part of the eastern border of the town.

== Demographics ==
Historical population
Census	Pop.	Note	%±
1830	931		—
1840	1,173		26.0%
1850	2,508		113.8%
1860	3,061		22.0%
1870	3,249		6.1%
1880	3,495		7.6%
1890	3,265		−6.6%
1900	3,514		7.6%
1910	2,980		−15.2%
1920	2,681		−10.0%
1930	2,538		−5.3%
1940	2,502		−1.4%
1950	2,416		−3.4%
1960	2,489		3.0%
1970	2,528		1.6%
1980	2,635		4.2%
1990	2,576		−2.2%
2000	2,477		−3.8%
2010	2,407		−2.8%
2016 (est.)	2,367		−1.7%
U.S. Decennial Census

As of the census of 2000, there were 2,477 people, 983 households, and 694 families residing in the town. The population density was 27.5 inhabitants per square mile (10.6/km^{2}). There were 1,545 housing units at an average density of 17.2 per square mile (6.6/km^{2}). The racial makeup of the town was 98.26% White, 0.48% African American, 0.08% Native American, 0.24% Asian, 0.52% from other races, and 0.40% from two or more races. Hispanic or Latino of any race were 2.10% of the population.

There were 983 households, out of which 30.5% had children under the age of 18 living with them, 56.6% were married couples living together, 8.5% had a female householder with no husband present, and 29.3% were non-families. 24.6% of all households were made up of individuals, and 11.7% had someone living alone who was 65 years of age or older. The average household size was 2.52 and the average family size was 2.99.

In the town, the population was spread out, with 25.2% under the age of 18, 7.3% from 18 to 24, 23.9% from 25 to 44, 27.9% from 45 to 64, and 15.7% who were 65 years of age or older. The median age was 40 years. For every 100 females, there were 101.1 males. For every 100 females age 18 and over, there were 98.7 males.

The median income for a household in the town was $33,309, and the median income for a family was $40,472. Males had a median income of $31,344 versus $20,365 for females. The per capita income for the town was $17,083. About 12.9% of families and 15.6% of the population were below the poverty line, including 22.7% of those under age 18 and 9.0% of those age 65 or over.

== Communities and locations in Sanford ==
- Arctic Lake – A lake located in the northeastern corner of the town.
- Big Hollow – A valley north of Deposit.
- Danville – A hamlet near the southern border of the town.
- Deposit – The village of Deposit is partly in Broome County and partly in Delaware County. It is bypassed to the south by NY Route 17, with access from exits 83 and 84.
- Gulf Summit – A hamlet in the southwestern part of the town, south of NY-17.
- Howes – A hamlet near the western town line in the north part of the town on NY-41.
- McClure – A hamlet in the southern part of the town with access from Exit 82 on NY-17. It was formerly known as "McClure Settlement", named after William McClure, surveyor and early settler.
- North Sanford – A hamlet near the northern and eastern town lines on County Road 241.
- Ouaquaga – A former community in the town.
- Oquaga Creek – A stream that flows through most of the town and empties into the West Branch of the Delaware River by Deposit.
- Oquaga Lake – A small lake in the southeastern part of the town bordered by County Road 237.
- Oquaga Creek State Park – A state park in the northeastern corner of the town.
- Page Pond Hill – A mountain located north-northwest of Sanford.
- Sanford – The hamlet of Sanford is on NY Route 41 near the center of the town.
- Vallonia Springs – A hamlet at the western town line.
