= Rock Rift, New York =

- Hamlet
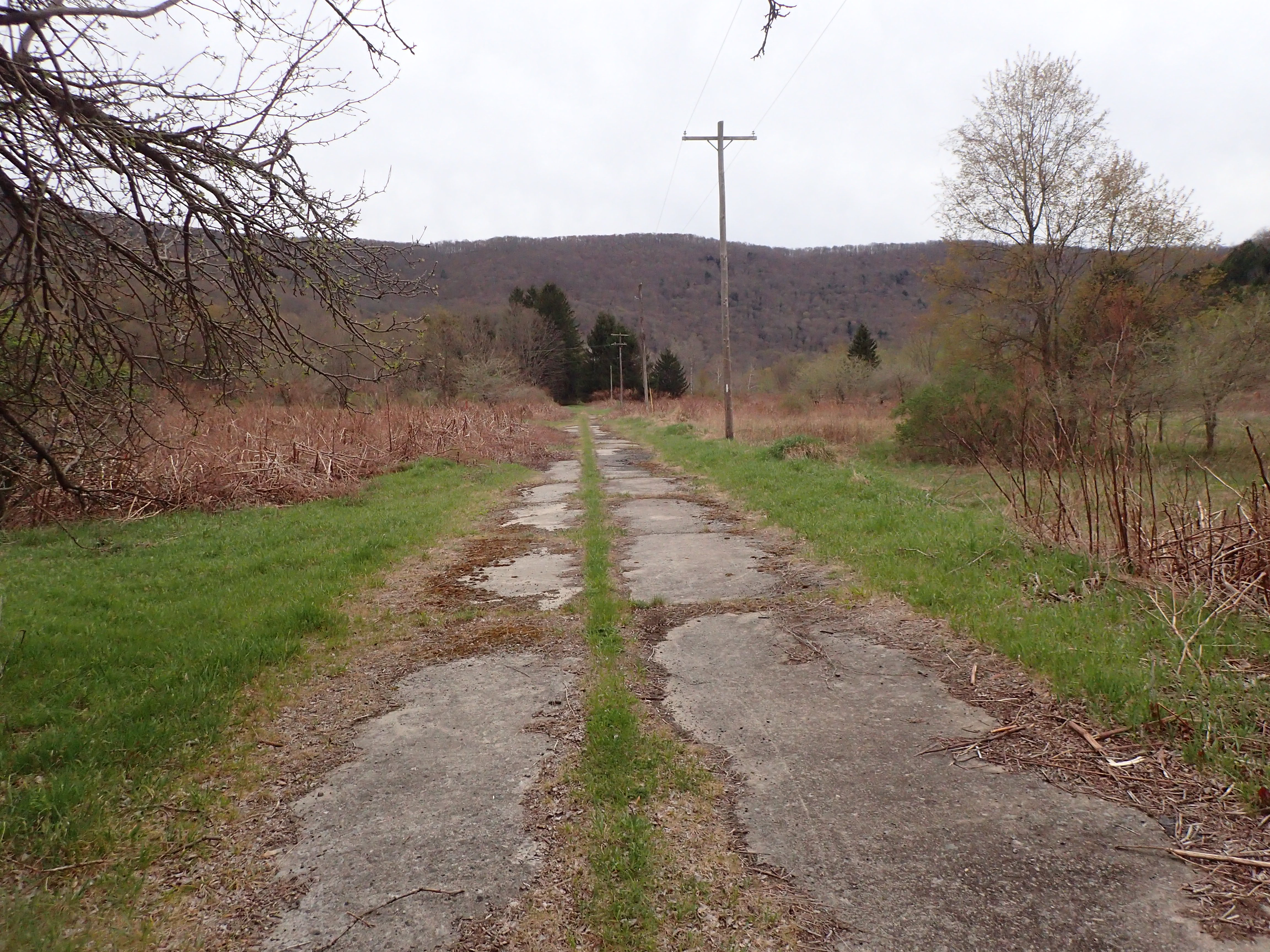
- Abandoned road leading to the former hamlet of Rock Rift

- Location within the state of New York
- Coordinates: 42°05′32″N 75°11′31″W
- Country: United States
- State: New York
- County: Delaware
- Town: Tompkins
- Elevation: 1,289 ft (393 m)
- Time zone: UTC-5 (Eastern (EST))
  - Summer (DST): UTC-4 (EDT)

Rock Rift was a hamlet in Delaware County, New York, United States. It was located southwest of Walton on the bank of the West Branch Delaware River. Rock Rift was taken by eminent domain by New York City to build the Cannonsville Reservoir.

There is a hiking trail that passes through the former settlement, constructed and maintained by the Finger Lakes Trail Conference (FLTC). Crumbling pavement from portions of old New York State Route 10 descend into the waters of the reservoir. Some bluestone front steps to homes and businesses remain, as the heart of the village was mostly located above the current waterline of Cannonsville Reservoir. The reservoir dams a portion of the West Branch of the Delaware River and provides potable water for New York City.
