= Deposit (village), New York =

Deposit, New York
- Village
- Village of Deposit
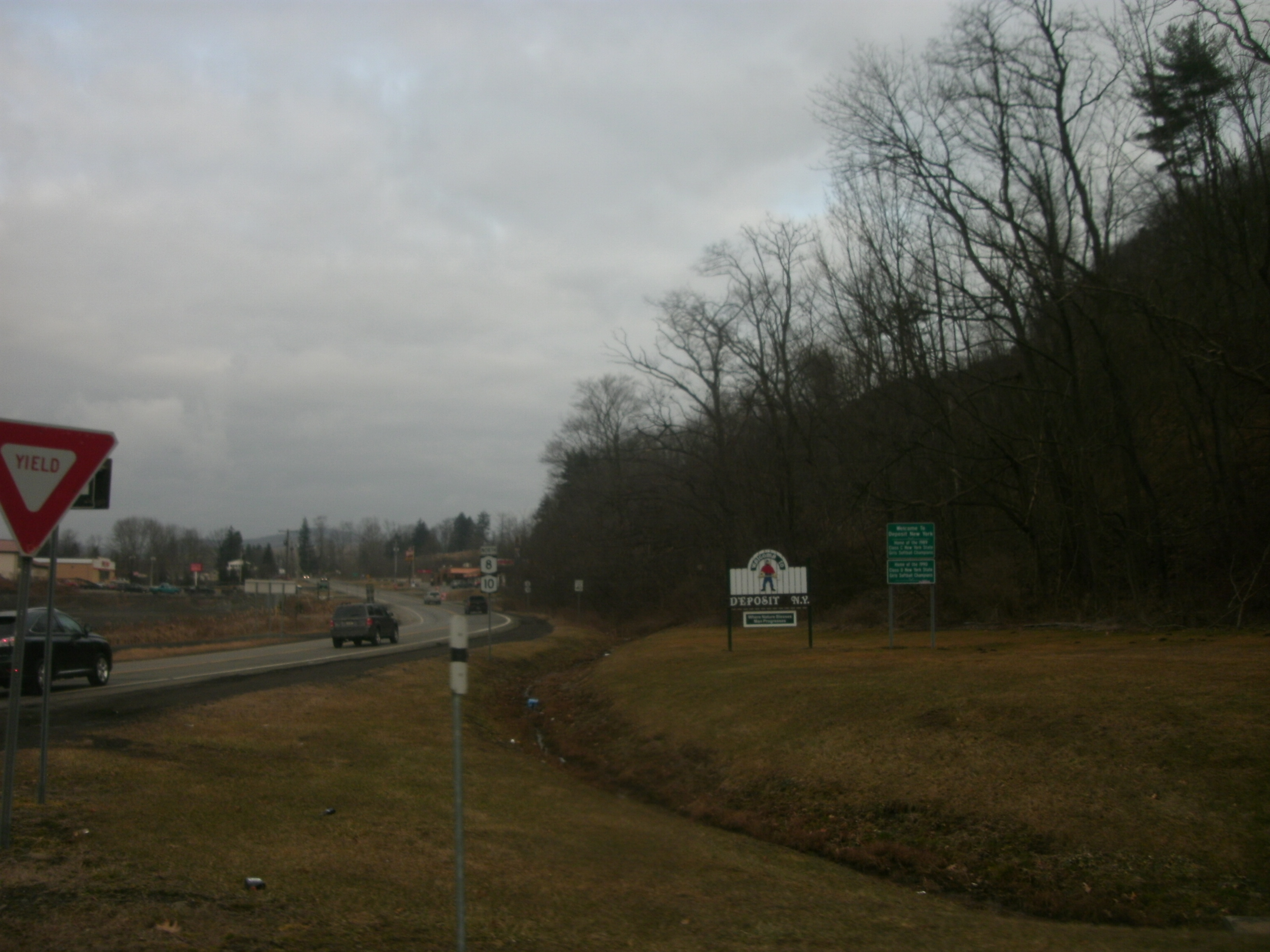
- Entrance to Deposit along New York State Route 10

- Seal
- Motto: "Where nature blesses, there man progresses."
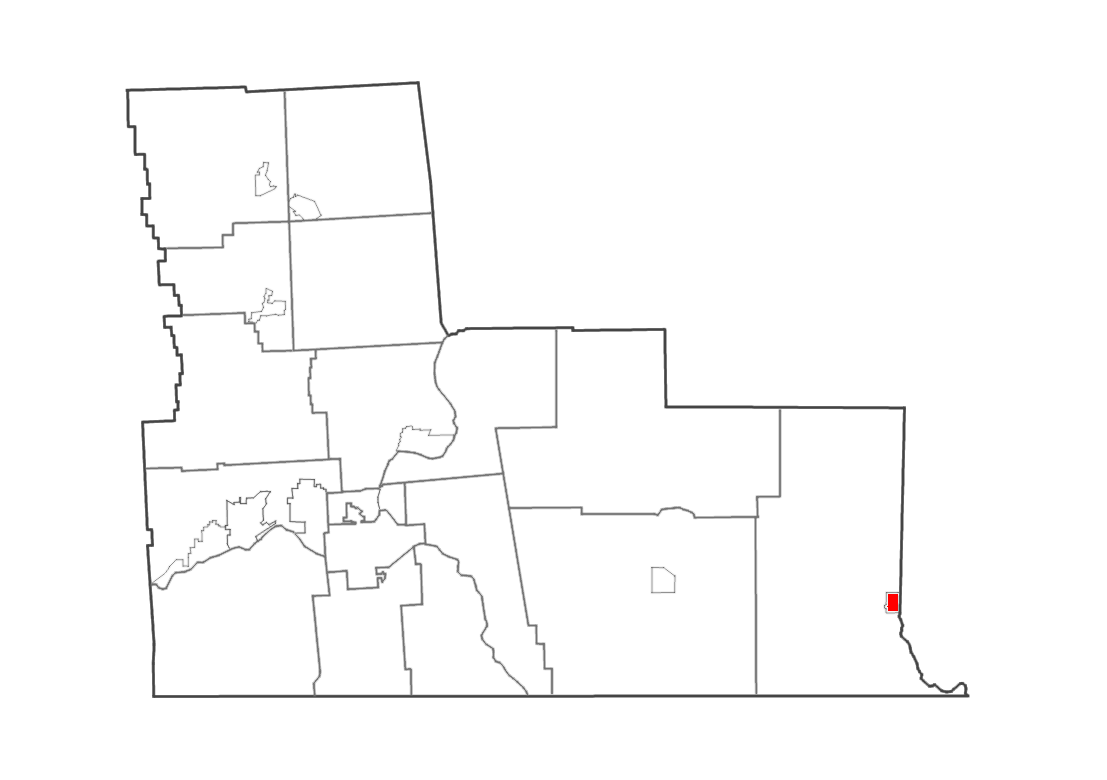
- Location within Broome County

- Location within the state of New York
- Coordinates: 42°3′43″N 75°25′24″W
- Country: United States
- State: New York
- Counties: Broome, Delaware
- Towns: Sanford, Deposit

Area
  - Total: 1.32 sq mi (3.41 km^{2})
  - Land: 1.26 sq mi (3.27 km^{2})
  - Water: 0.054 sq mi (0.14 km^{2})
- Elevation: 991 ft (302 m)

Population (2020)
  - Total: 1,387
  - Density: 1,098.3/sq mi (424.05/km^{2})
- Time zone: UTC-5 (Eastern (EST))
  - Summer (DST): UTC-4 (EDT)
- ZIP code: 13754
- Area code: 607
- FIPS code: 36-20346
- GNIS feature ID: 2391639
- Website: villageofdeposit.org

Deposit is a village in Broome and Delaware counties in the U.S. state of New York. The population was 1,387 at the 2020 census.

The village, on the county line, is half within the town of Sanford (Broome County) and half within the town of Deposit (Delaware County). The Broome County portion of Deposit is part of the Binghamton Metropolitan Statistical Area.

== History ==
Perspective map and list of landmarks from 1887 by L.R. Burleigh

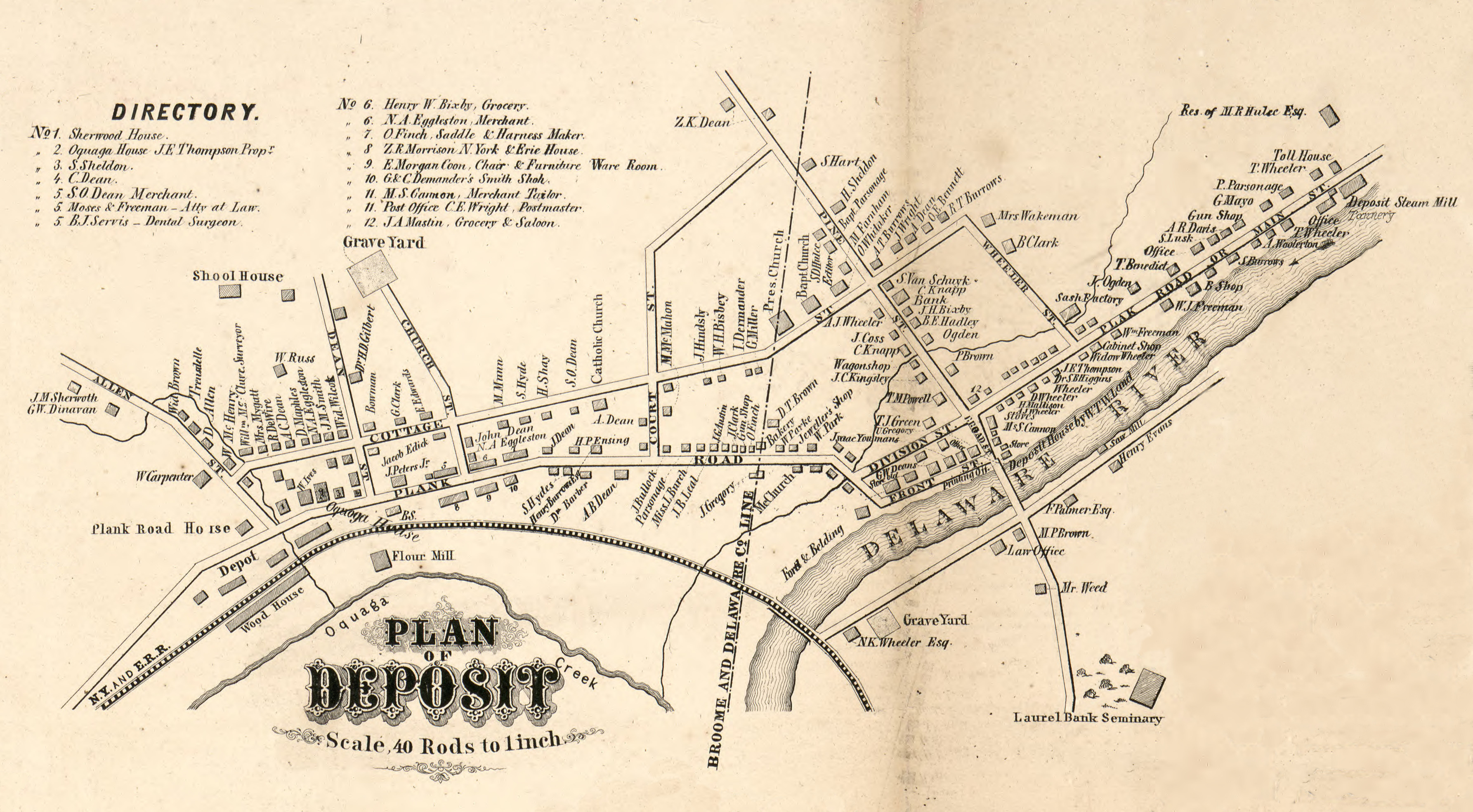
Plan of Deposit from 1855 by Gifford and Wenig

The position of the village is at the boundary of White and Indian territory, as imposed by the 1763 Fort Stanwix Treaty. The village was incorporated in 1811 in Delaware County. Deposit is one of only twelve villages in New York still incorporated under a charter, the other villages having incorporated or re-incorporated under the provisions of Village Law.

While the dairy industry is now important, the name of the town is said to derive from its status as a lumber center, when it was the place at which logs were "deposited" for timber rafting south on the Delaware River.

Revolutionary Cemetery, located on Airport Road, features a central monument inscribed with the names of the Revolutionary War veterans buried there, as well as a historical marker stating that it was ''originally an Indian burial ground"; it also contains graves of veterans of the War of 1812.

== Geography ==
The village is located by the West Branch of the Delaware River and the Southern Tier Expressway (New York Route 17). The village is 30 miles (48 km) east of Binghamton and 3 miles (5 km) north of the Pennsylvania border.

Deposit is located at 42°3′43″N 75°25′24″W (42.061856, -75.423358).

According to the United States Census Bureau, the village has a total area of 1.3 square miles (3.4 km^{2}), of which 1.3 square miles (3.3 km^{2}) is land and 0.039 square miles (0.1 km^{2}), or 4.04%, is water.

== Demographics ==
Historical population
Census	Pop.	Note	%±
1870	1,286		—
1880	1,419		10.3%
1890	1,530		7.8%
1900	2,051		34.1%
1910	1,864		−9.1%
1920	1,943		4.2%
1930	1,887		−2.9%
1940	2,028		7.5%
1950	2,016		−0.6%
1960	2,025		0.4%
1970	2,061		1.8%
1980	1,897		−8.0%
1990	1,936		2.1%
2000	1,699		−12.2%
2010	1,663		−2.1%
2020	1,387		−16.6%
U.S. Decennial Census

As of the census of 2000, there were 1,699 people, 716 households, and 436 families residing in the village. The population density was 1,350.9 inhabitants per square mile (521.6/km^{2}). There were 823 housing units at an average density of 654.4 per square mile (252.7/km^{2}). The racial makeup of the village was 96.53% White, 0.94% African American, 0.06% Native American, 0.82% Asian, 0.06% Pacific Islander, 0.94% from other races, and 0.65% from two or more races. Hispanic or Latino of any race were 2.71% of the population.

There were 716 households, out of which 31.1% had children under the age of 18 living with them, 43.7% were married couples living together, 12.4% had a female householder with no husband present, and 39.0% were non-families. 34.1% of all households were made up of individuals, and 19.1% had someone living alone who was 65 years of age or older. The average household size was 2.37 and the average family size was 3.03.

In the village, the population was spread out, with 27.1% under the age of 18, 8.8% from 18 to 24, 24.8% from 25 to 44, 22.1% from 45 to 64, and 17.2% who were 65 years of age or older. The median age was 37 years. For every 100 females, there were 87.5 males. For every 100 females age 18 and over, there were 84.9 males.

The median income for a household in the village was $24,702, and the median income for a family was $32,016. Males had a median income of $27,202 versus $19,333 for females. The per capita income for the village was $14,390. About 15.0% of families and 17.6% of the population were below the poverty line, including 25.8% of those under age 18 and 12.8% of those age 65 or over.
