= Stilesville, New York =

- Hamlet
- Location within the state of New York
- Coordinates: 42°04′49″N 75°23′57″W
- Country: United States
- State: New York
- County: Delaware
- Town: Deposit
- Elevation: 1,001 ft (305 m)
- Time zone: UTC-5 (Eastern (EST))
  - Summer (DST): UTC-4 (EDT)

Stilesville is a hamlet in Delaware County, New York. It is located northeast of Deposit at the intersection of NY Route 8 and NY Route 10. The West Branch Delaware River flows west through the hamlet.
