= New York State Route 268 =

State highway in Delaware County, New York, US

New York State Route 268
- NY 268 highlighted in red

Route information
- Maintained by NYSDOT
- Length: 10.66 mi (17.16 km)
- Existed: early 1990s–present

Major junctions
- South end: NY 97 in Hancock village
- Future I-86 / NY 17 in Hancock town
- North end: NY 10 in Tompkins

Location
- Country: United States
- State: New York
- Counties: Delaware

Highway system
- New York Highways; Interstate; US; State; Reference; Parkways
← NY 268	→ NY 269

New York State Route 268 (NY 268) is a state highway located in southwestern Delaware County, New York, in the United States. It runs from NY 97 in Hancock north over 10 miles (16 km) to a bridge over Cannonsville Reservoir near the former site of the hamlet of Apex in Tompkins. There, it ends at a junction with NY 10. NY 268 meets the Quickway (NY 17) (Future Interstate 86) east of the Hancock village limits.

From Hancock to the NY 17 interchange, NY 268 follows the pre-Quickway routing of NY 17. Between NY 17 and NY 10, the route follows the former alignment of New York State Route 236, a connector between then-NY 17 and NY 10 that existed during the 1930s. In the floods of 2006 some of the areas along this rural highway suffered serious landslides, leading to a temporary closure of the road.

== Route description ==
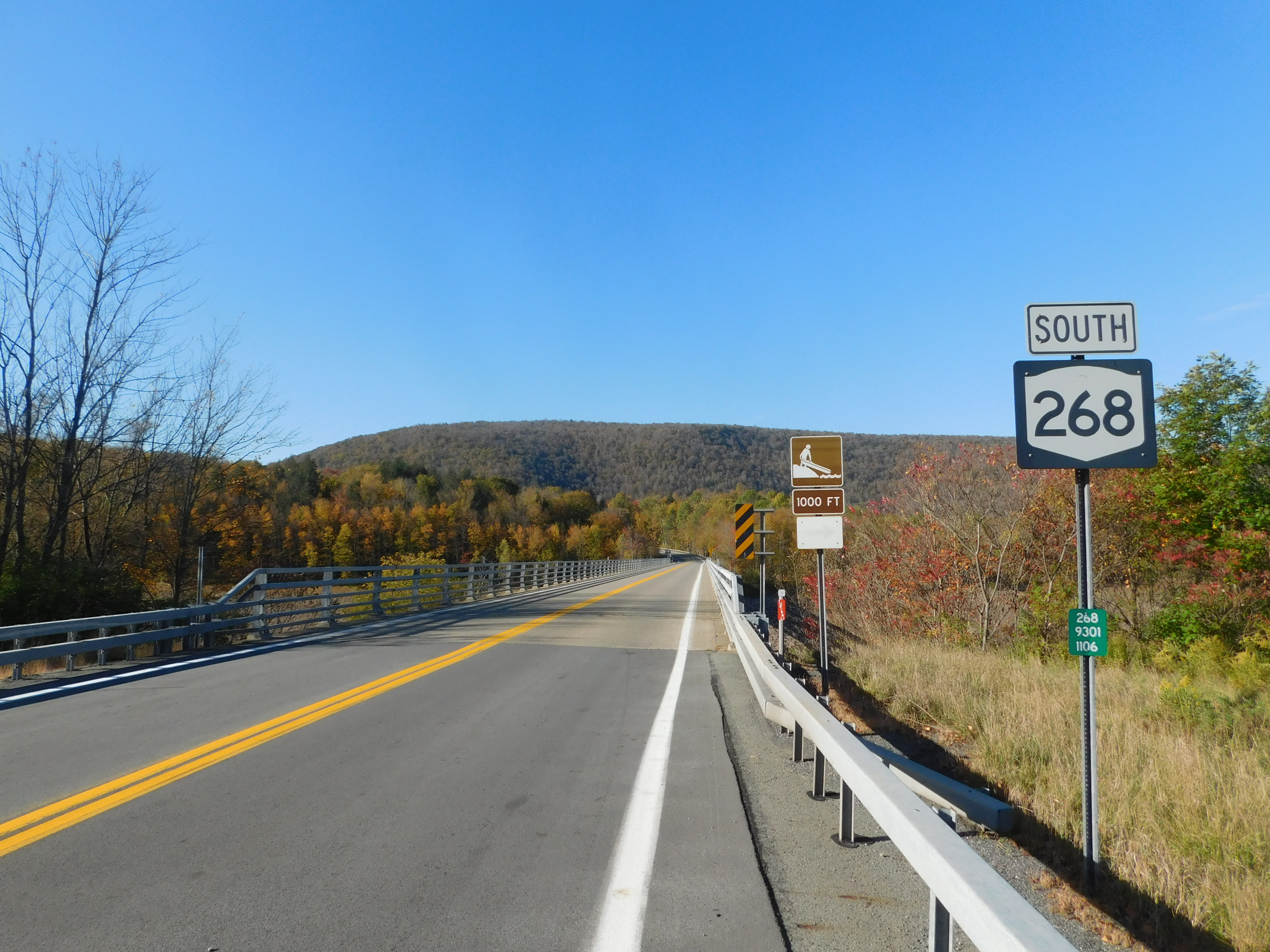
NY 268 southbound from NY 10 in Tompkins

NY 268 begins at an intersection with NY 97 in eastern Hancock. The route heads northeast, paralleling the Quickway (NY 17) (Future I-86) and following the east branch of the Delaware River's northern bank through the town of Hancock toward the hamlet of Cadosia. South of the hamlet, NY 268 connects to NY 17 at exit 87A; however, there is no access between NY 268 and westbound NY 17. Just past the exit, NY 268 leaves the pre-Quickway routing of NY 17 and follows Cadosia Creek north through a large valley into Cadosia.

Past Cadosia, NY 268 proceeds through a heavily rural area of Delaware County. Upon entering the town of Tompkins, the route passes through Kerry Siding, a small community composed of less than a dozen structures. Farther north, Cadosia Creek reaches its source 2 miles (3.2 km) from the town line and midway between Kerry Siding and Apex, another small hamlet situated on the route. NY 268 continues past Apex to the eastern portion of the Cannonsville Reservoir, which it crosses by way of a 184.1-meter-long (604 ft) bridge before terminating at NY 10 on the northern bank of the reservoir.

All of NY 268 is part of New York State Bicycle Route 17, which continues southeast toward Port Jervis on NY 97 and west toward Deposit on NY 10.

== History ==
The segment of modern NY 268 between the Hancock hamlet of Cadosia and NY 10 in Tompkins was originally designated NY 236 c. 1931. At its southern end, the route connected to NY 17, which followed current NY 268 southwest into the village of Hancock at the time. The NY 236 designation was removed c. 1940; however, the route remained state-maintained long afterward as NY 989 and later NY 990P, both unsigned reference route designations.

In the mid-1960s, NY 17 was rerouted onto a new limited-access highway, known as the Quickway, in the vicinity of Hancock and Cadosia. The former routing of NY 17 remained state maintained as an extension of NY 989 and NY 990P between the two locations. All of NY 990P was redesignated as NY 268 between 1989 and 1993. In the floods of 2006 between June 25 and July 5, some of the areas along NY 268 suffered serious landslides and, as a result, was temporarily closed off by the New York State Department of Transportation. The road was reopened to traffic in mid-July.

== Major intersections ==
The entire route is in Delaware County.

Location	mi	km	Destinations	Notes
Village of Hancock	0.00	0.00	NY 97 (Front Street / Stockport Road) to NY 17 – Upper Delaware River, Roebling Bridge, Zane Grey Museum	Southern terminus
Town of Hancock	1.35	2.17	NY 17 east	Exit 87A on the Quickway (NY 17 / future I-86); partial diamond interchange; eastbound entry and westbound exit only; hamlet of Cadosia
Tompkins	10.66	17.16	NY 10 – Deposit, Walton	Northern terminus
1.000 mi = 1.609 km; 1.000 km = 0.621 mi
