= Red Apple Rest =

Restaurant in Tuxedo, New York, United States

Coordinates: 41°14′26.5″N 74°10′34.5″W

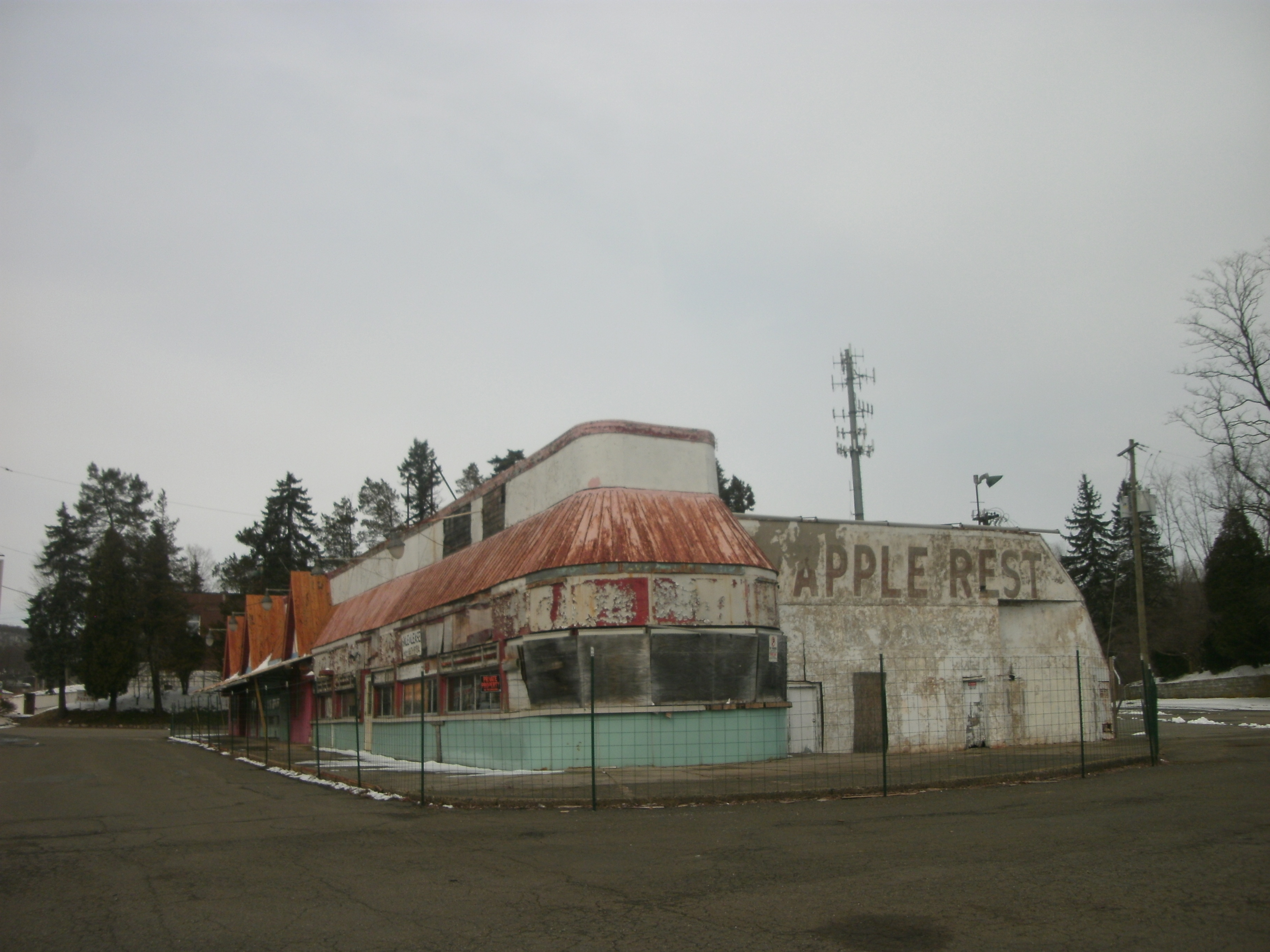
The Red Apple Rest in March 2013, seven years after the place was abandoned. The building is now fenced off.

The Red Apple Rest was a cafeteria-style restaurant on New York State Route 17, in the Southfields section of Tuxedo, New York. It was a noted way station for people traveling to the hotels of the Catskill Mountains of upstate New York.

Before the New York State Thruway was built, the travel time from New York City to the Catskill Mountains was often four or five hours, especially during weekends. The Red Apple Rest, located almost halfway, became a major roadside stopping place. The restaurant was opened in May 1931 by Reuben Freed.

Demolition of the site began on October 31, 2023.

== History ==
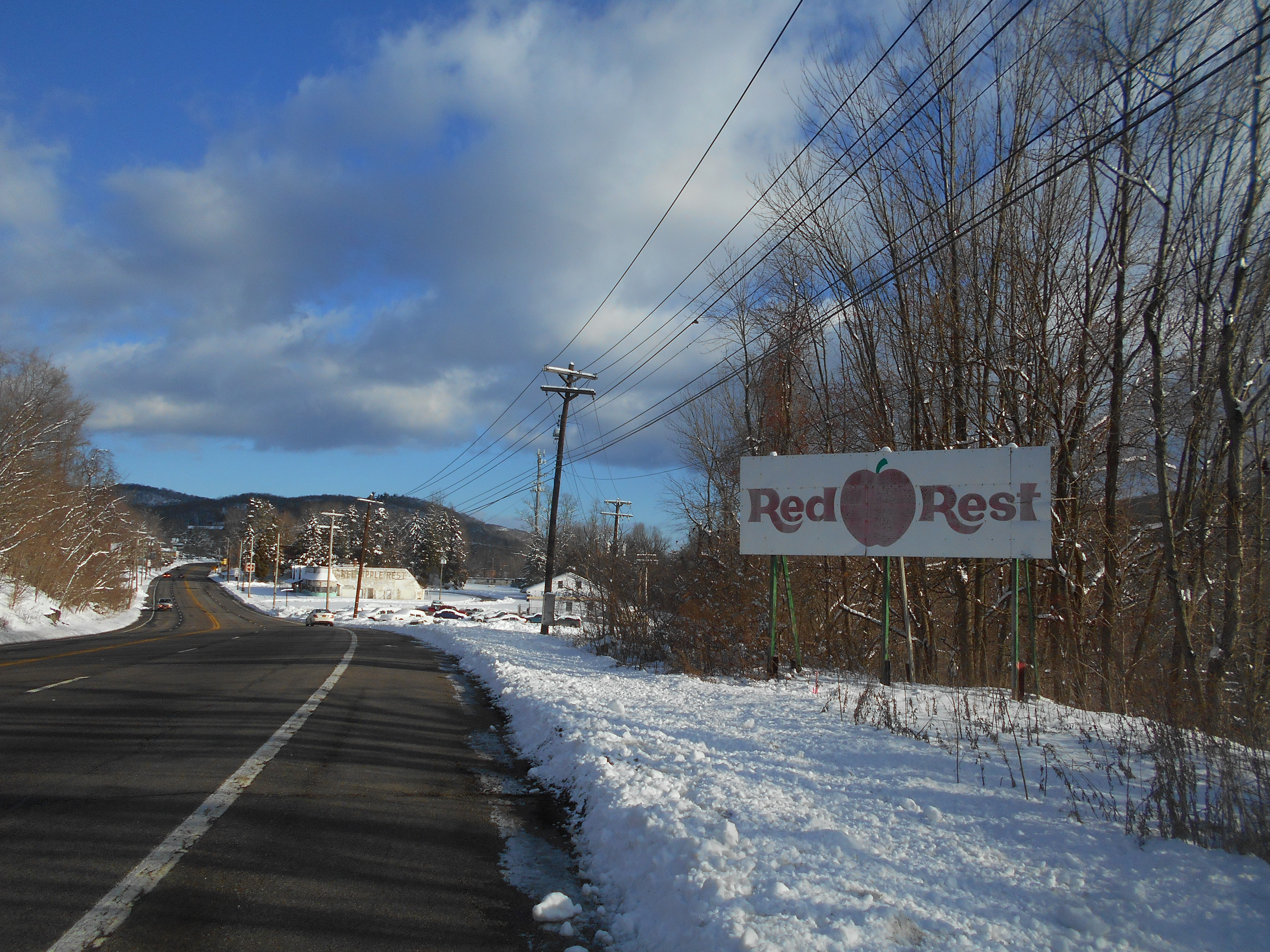
Red Apple Rest signage on NY 17. The former restaurant in visible in the distance

The Red Apple Rest had a great deal of business during the 1940s and 1950s. It was open 365 days a year, 24 hours a day, and was patronized by so-called "Borscht Belt" comedians and professional athletes as well as families traveling to campgrounds and resorts. Although the Thruway (which was built beginning in 1953) bypassed the restaurant, and vacationing in the Catskill Mountains became less popular after the 1960s, the restaurant remained very busy until the 1970s. In 1965 the Red Apple Rest served one million customers.

In his book on Jewish comedians in America, The Haunted Smile, author Lawrence J. Epstein said that comedians would stop at the Red Apple Rest late at night and "would go over the acts, describe the audience, and gather gossip about the other comedians and about routines ripe for buying or 'borrowing.'"

The Red Apple Motel, which is sited on the hill to the west of the restaurant, was used by performers late into the 1970s. Several Rock and Roll musicians stayed during their bookings in New York City. The location was secluded and the staff was either 'cool about it' or uninformed. Many well known performers roamed through nearby Sterling Forest while waiting to travel to their nighttime venues. One hotel guest that can be named now is George Carlin, who stayed in room 102 during his Saturday Night Live opening week. He required silence during the morning hours to allow for rest, but was very active with the staff during the night. It was common for him to trial material with the night shift desk clerk.

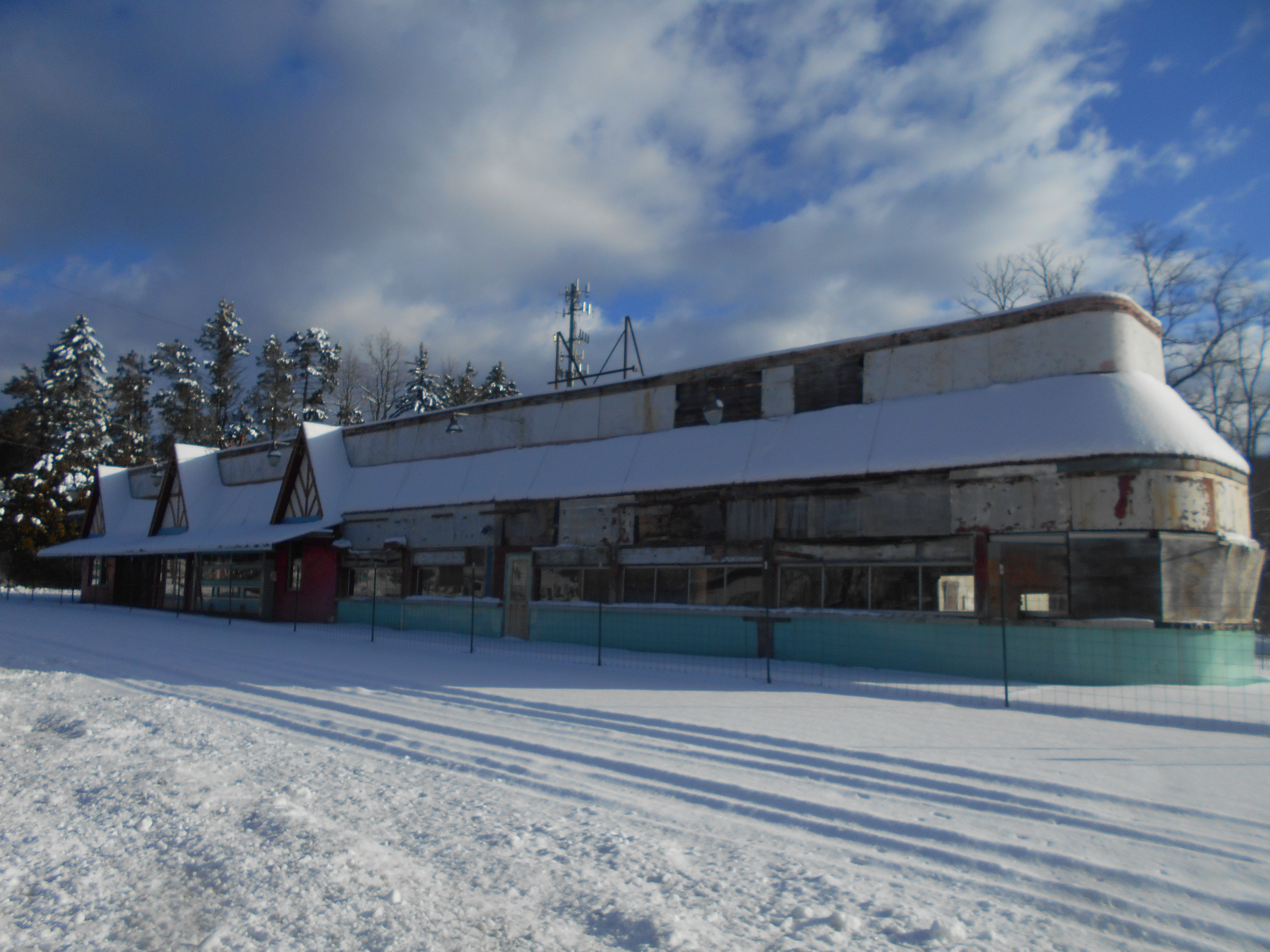
The front of the Red Apple Rest in January 2015, nearly nine years after abandonment

After 53 years under the Freed family management, the Red Apple Rest was sold in 1984 to a Greek businessman who ran it for another 22 years. At that point it was mostly catering to locals due to the fact that the Catskills had dwindled away as a destination. It closed in September 2006—purportedly for various reasons.

The restaurant was featured in several movies such as Woody Allen's Deconstructing Harry, A Walk on the Moon, Tenderness and Oliver's Story, and the November 28, 2013, installment of Bill Griffith's comic strip Zippy.

== Possible redevelopment ==
On August 25, 2011, the Times Herald-Record ran an article about the town of Tuxedo and a group of British entrepreneurs looking to find a location for a new Ace Eatery. Inspired by a YouTube video, the Red Apple Rest was nominated as a potential place to open a new-eatery meant for bikers. Tuxedo town supervisor Peter Dolan mentioned that about 17,000 bikes go through Tuxedo during the summer. However, the building also needed major renovation work and was up against many other possible locations. If the Red Apple Rest had been chosen, the new restaurant would have opened in 2012.

== Stop at the Red Apple book ==
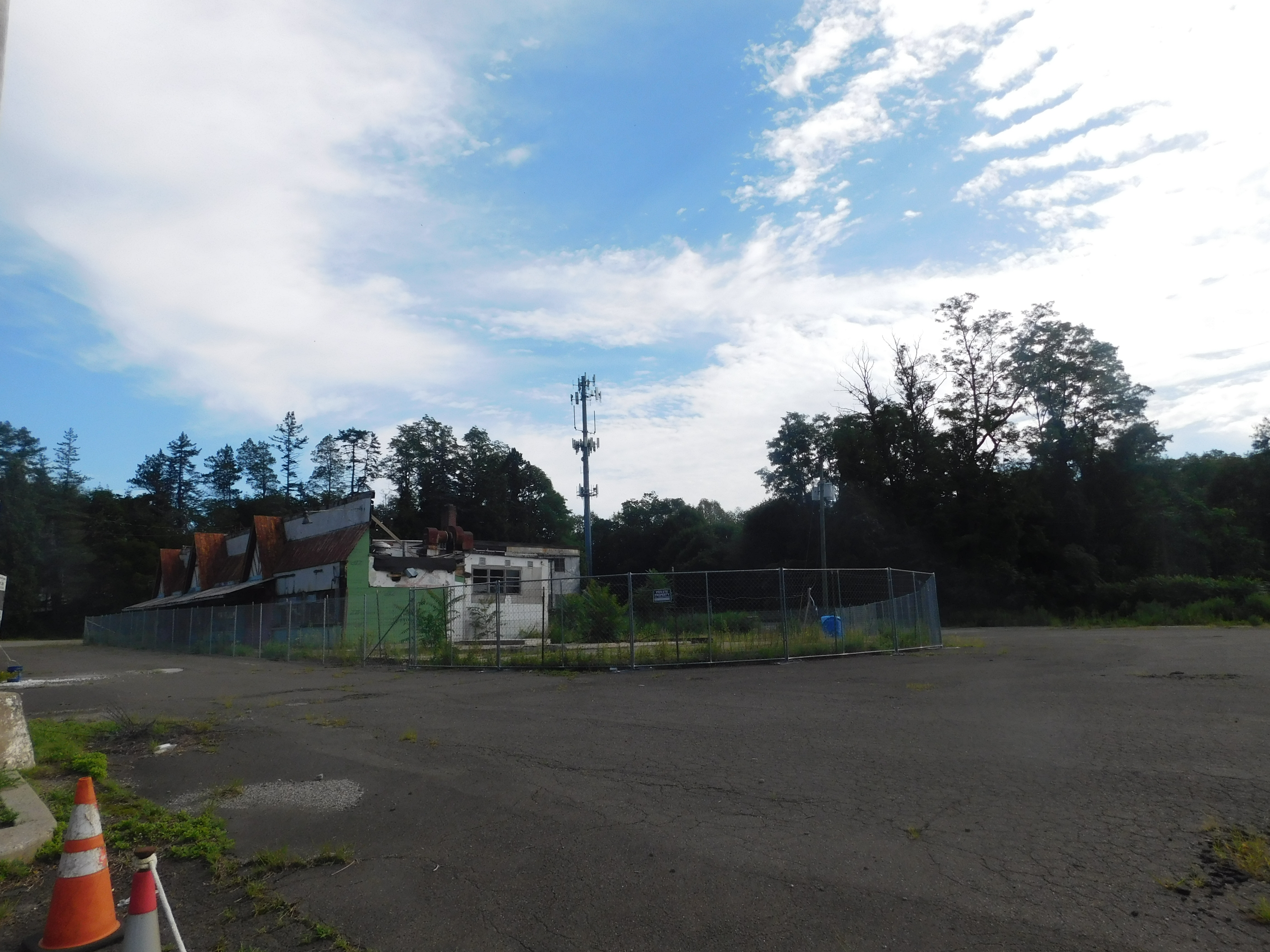
The Red Apple Rest in August 2024 after partial demolition of the structure

Founder Reuben Freed's youngest daughter, Elaine Freed Lindenblatt, published Stop at the Red Apple (SUNY Press, 2014), a memoir chronicling the 50-plus-year history of the original Red Apple Rest in its heyday and beyond.

== Demolition ==
A partial demolition of the Red Apple Rest began on October 30, 2023 due to a section of the building collapsing that year. As a result, one-third of the building came down.
