= New York State Route 97 =

State highway in southern New York, US

New York State Route 97
- NY 97 highlighted in red

Route information
- Maintained by NYSDOT and the city of Port Jervis
- Length: 70.54 mi (113.52 km)
- Existed: 1930–present

Major junctions
- South end: US 6 / US 209 / NY 42 in Port Jervis
- NY 55 / PA 434 in Barryville NY 52 in Tusten; NY 17B in Delaware NY 268 in Hancock
- North end: Future I-86 / NY 17 in Hancock

Location
- Country: United States
- State: New York
- Counties: Orange, Sullivan, Delaware

Highway system
- New York Highways; Interstate; US; State; Reference; Parkways
← NY 96B	→ NY 98

New York State Route 97 (NY 97) is a 70.53-mile-long (113.51 km) north–south scenic route in southern New York in the United States. It runs from U.S. Route 6 (US 6) and US 209 in Port Jervis to NY 17 (Future Interstate 86) in Hancock. Its most famous feature is the Hawk's Nest, a tightly winding section of the road along the Delaware River, located a few miles north of Port Jervis. NY 97 intersects NY 52 in Narrowsburg and indirectly connects to three Pennsylvania state highways due to its proximity to the state line.

The New York State Legislature created Route 3-a, an unsigned legislative route extending from Port Jervis to Hancock along the Delaware River, in 1911. Initially, it was a route in name only as the portion north of Port Jervis had yet to be built. Several parts of the route were constructed during the 1920s, and by the time the NY 97 designation was created as part of the 1930 renumbering of state highways in New York, only two sections were still unconstructed. The entirety of the highway officially opened on August 30, 1939, capping a construction project that cost $4 million (equivalent to $92.6 million in 2025) to complete.

NY 97 began in the city of Port Jervis and ended in Callicoon when it was assigned in 1930. At that time, the remainder of modern NY 97 was part of NY 17B. During May 1939, the state proposed a new designation of New York State Route 17L (NY 17L) for the section between Hancock and Bradley's Corners (south of Middletown). After opposition by a local committee, NY 97 was extended north to Hancock in June 1939, overlapping NY 17B. The latter route was truncated to Callicoon in the 1960s. It is also shared with New York State Bicycle Route 17, except between NY 17 and NY 268.

== Route description ==
=== Port Jervis to Pond Eddy ===
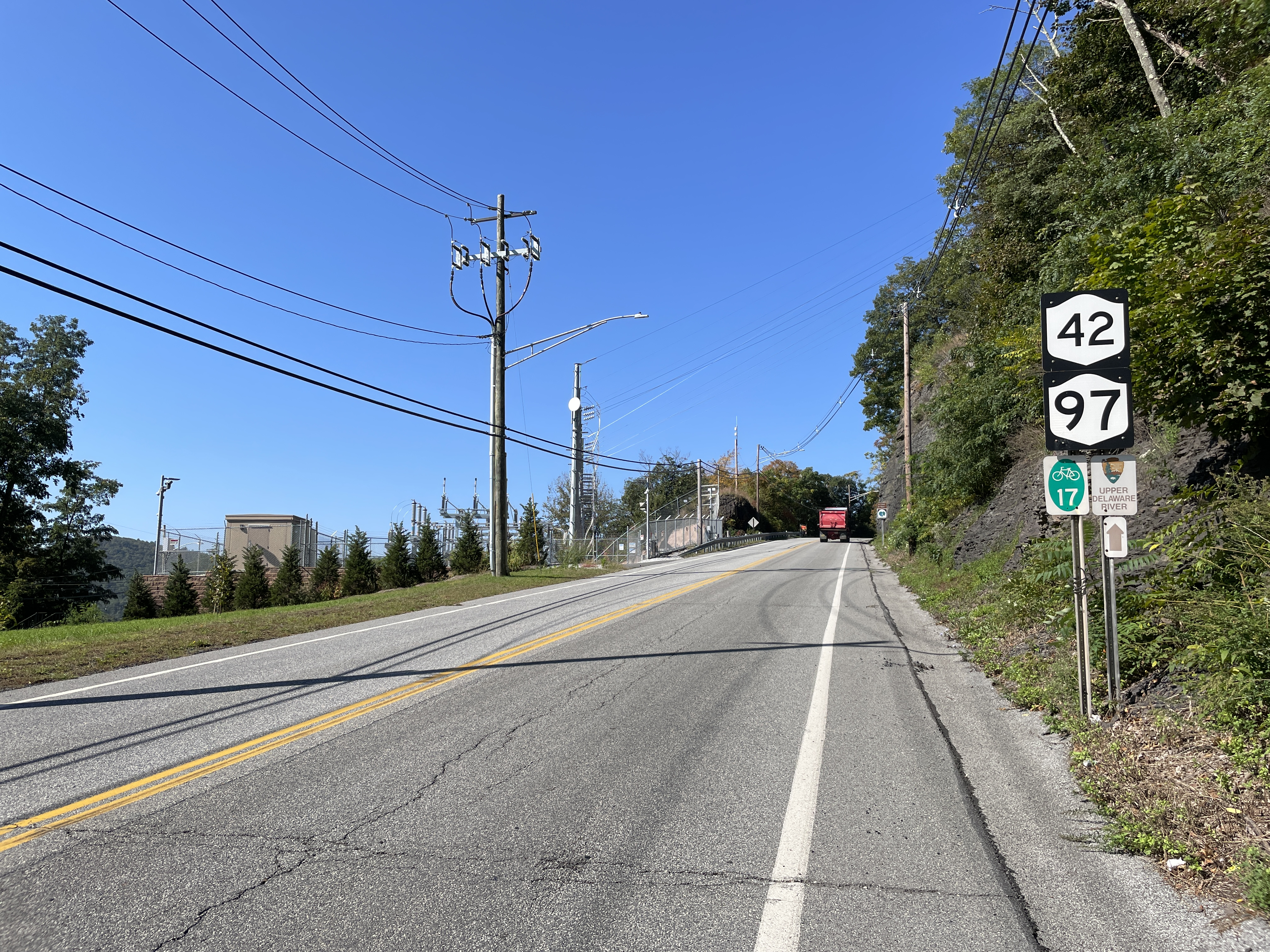
NY 42/NY 97 northbound in Port Jervis

NY 97 begins at an intersection with US 6 and US 209 (Pike Street / East Main Street) in the city of Port Jervis. NY 97 is immediately concurrent with NY 42 as the route proceeds west on West Main Street, a two-lane commercial street. NY 42 and NY 97 soon split from West Main Street for Park Avenue in the Germantown section of Port Jervis, north of the Port Jervis Metro-North Railroad station. NY 42 and NY 97 soon leave Port Jervis for the town of Deerpark, paralleling the Norfolk Southern Southern Tier Line (ex-Erie Railroad Delaware Division) past and soon into the hamlet of Sparrowbush.

In Sparrowbush, NY 42 and NY 97 proceed west, passing north of the Eddy Farm Christian Retreat Center before bending northwest through the hamlet. After the intersection with Darraugh Lane, NY 42 forks off on a new right-of-way to the northeast, while NY 97 continues northwest on the current alignment. The route quickly bends north, intersecting with Hook Road, which connects to the nearby fishing area. NY 97 continues north, paralleling NY 42 and the Delaware River into the Hawk's Nest section of Deerpark. In Hawk's Nest, NY 97 runs alongside the side of several cliffs overlooking the Delaware. As the river bends to the west, NY 97 bends westward out of Hawk's Nest, bending southwest into Sullivan County.

Upon entering Sullivan County, NY 97 enters the hamlet of Sparrowbush, where it crosses over the Mongaup River. Now in the town of Lumberland, NY 97 soon bends to the west, running alongside the Delaware River, passing through the hamlet of Knight's Eddy before bending northwest. After another large bend to the southwest once again, NY 97 enters the hamlet of Pond Eddy. In Pond Eddy, NY 97 intersects with County Route 41 (CR 41), which proceeds north as High Road while crosses the nearby Pond Eddy Bridge into Shohola Township, Pennsylvania and the unsigned quadrant State Route 1011 on the opposite shore. NY 97 remains a two-lane residential road through Pond Eddy before leaving the hamlet further to the southwest.

=== Barryville to Narrowsburg ===
Bending northwest once again, NY 97 continues alongside the river, entering a small commercial stretch through the town of Lumberland, before turning southwest once again. Just before an intersection with Tuthill Road, NY 97 bends northwest and away from the river before bending northeastward to the riverside once again. During another curve to the northwest, NY 97 enters the hamlet of Handsome Eddy, which consists of a few farms. After crossing into the town of Highland, it enters the hamlet of Barryville. In Barryville, NY 97 turns northwest and becomes a commercial street, intersecting with NY 55 and CR 11 in the center. Present as this junction is the Barryville–Shohola Bridge, which crosses the Delaware River and meets PA 434.

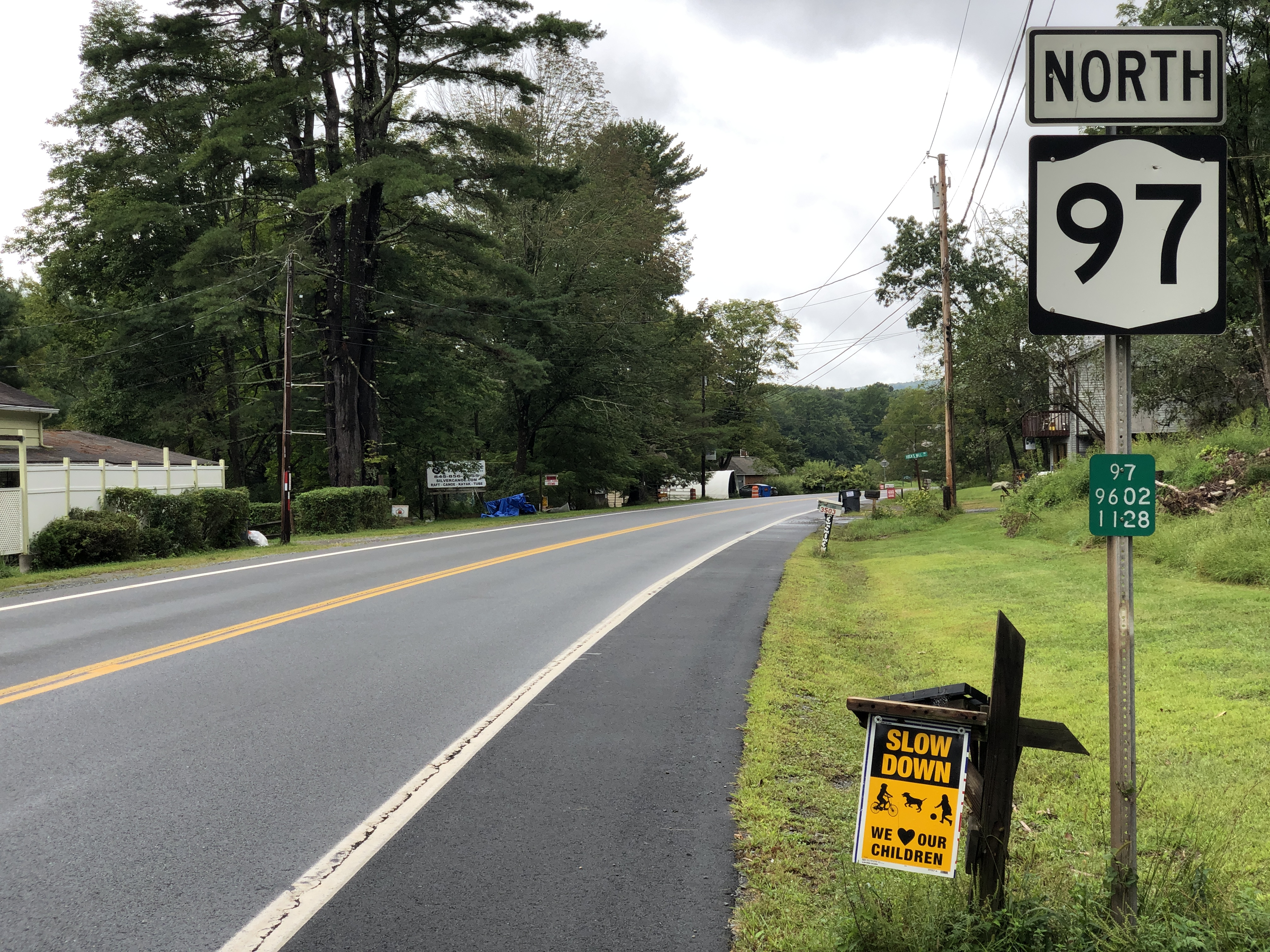
NY 97 northbound past the junction with NY 55 and CR 11 in Barryville

After NY 55, NY 97 continues west through Barryville, intersecting with the southern terminus of CR 21 (Yulan–Barryville Road), CR 21A and the western terminus of CR 11A (River Road). After leaving Barryville, NY 97 parallels CR 21 for a short distance, continuing west through the town of Highland alongside the Delaware River. The route bends southwestward once again, crossing past several homes as it winds through Highland. The route makes a short western stretch at an intersection with Old Minisink Ford Road before turning eastward into the hamlet of Minisink Ford. In Minisink Ford, NY 97 intersects with CR 168 (Minisink Battleground Road), which connects to Minisink Battleground County Park. NY 97 and CR 168 are concurrent for an extremely short distance, before CR 168 crosses the Delaware River on Roebling's Delaware Aqueduct into the borough of Lackawaxen, Pennsylvania.

After Minisink Ford, NY 97 bends northward along the river as a two-lane dense woods road through the town of Highland. After an intersection with Poblete Drive, NY 97 continues northward while the Delaware River bends west, and NY 97 enters the town of Tusten. Through Tusten, NY 97 makes several bends to the north, before maintaining a long northwest stretch after Grassy Swamp Road. Passing west of Rock Lake, NY 97 enters the hamlet of Tusten, where it bends northward again and soon intersecting with the western terminus of CR 23 (Lumberland–Mount Hope Road). A short distance later, CR 25 (Eckes Road) begins at an intersection with NY 97. After another bend to the southwest, NY 97 intersects with NY 52 and CR 111.

=== Tusten to Hankins ===
NY 52 and NY 97 become concurrent in the town of Tusten, soon entering the hamlet of Narrowsburg. Passing south of Feagles Lake, the two routes soon fork off, with NY 52 proceeding west on CR 24 (Bridge Street) to the Narrowsburg–Darbytown Bridge. NY 97 continues northwest, running along the eastern edge of Narrowsburg, passing Glenn Cove Cemetery, where it intersects with Kirk Road. At this junction, NY 97 returns the riverside, bending northeast and southeast alongside. Now paralleling the Southern Tier Line once again, the route continues through the town of Tusten, running north as a two-lane residential street. NY 97 soon bends northwest to the railroad then north again, entering the town of Cochecton.

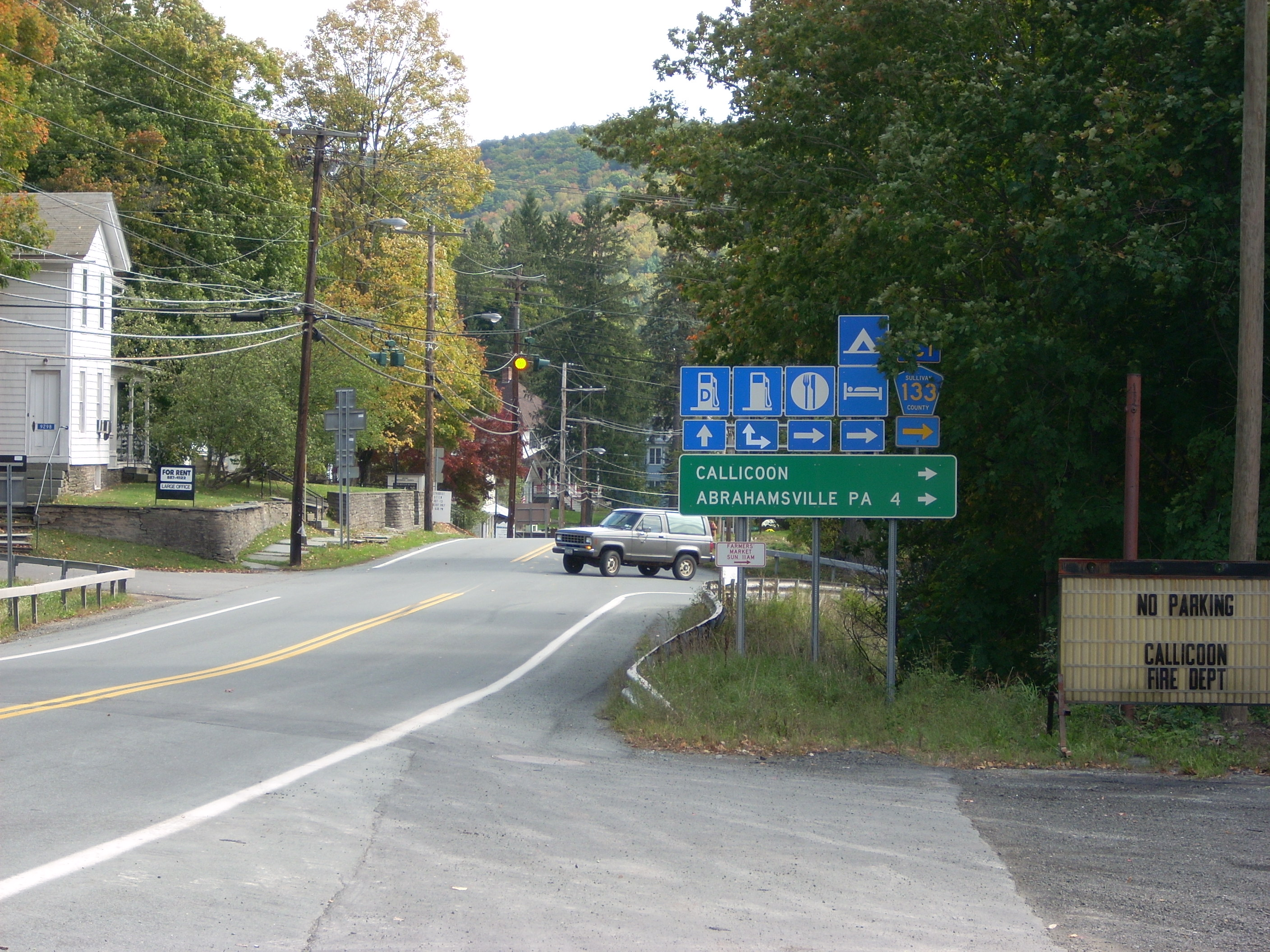
Looking south on NY 97 in Callicoon at the junction with CR 133

In Cochecton, NY 97 intersects with Skinners Falls Road, which connects to the hamlet of Skinners Falls and the Skinners Falls – Milanville Bridge. NY 97 meanwhile continues north away from the river, before rejoining a short distance north. After a short stretch to the northeast, CR 116 intersects. Paralleling the railroad tracks, NY 97 soon enters the hamlet of Cochecton, bending northeast out of the hamlet. At the end of the bend, CR 114 (Lake Huntington Road) intersects with NY 97, connecting the route to the Cochecton–Damascus Bridge and PA 371. NY 97 proceeds east for a short distance, where CR 114 forks towards Lake Huntington. After CR 114, NY 97 continues north alongside the railroad tracks before splitting for a few miles. The railroad tracks soon rejoin in the town of Delaware.

In Delaware, NY 97 and the railroad tracks proceed northward, entering the hamlet of Callicoon. In Callicoon, NY 97 crosses over a tributary of the Delaware River and intersects with the western terminus of NY 17B. After a stretch to the northwest, NY 97 runs along the northern edge of Callicoon and intersects with CR 133 (Fremont Street) at the outer edge of the hamlet. After CR 133, NY 97 bends north through Delaware, far from the riverside and railroad line. The three soon meet once again as NY 97 enters the town of Fremont. All three entities bend west and enter the hamlet of Hankins. In Hankins, CR 132 (Hankins Road) and CR 94 (Hankins Road) both terminate at NY 97, which runs as a two-lane commercial street.

=== Long Eddy to Hancock ===
After Long Eddy, NY 97 bends northeast through the town of Fremont, intersecting with Kellams Bridge Road. Kellams Bridge Road connects NY 97 to the Kellams–Stalker Bridge (also known as Little Equinunk Bridge). NY 97 continues northward, intersecting with the terminus of CR 134 (Basket Brook Road). After another dart to the west, NY 97 enters the hamlet of Long Eddy. In Long Eddy, NY 97 is the main road, passing multiple residences on both sides of the road. At an intersection with Kinney Road, NY 97 turns northward and crosses the county line into Delaware County. Upon crossing the county line, NY 97 is now in the town of Hancock. Through Hancock, NY 97 becomes a two-lane woods road, winding north and soon northeast into the hamlet of Pea Brook.

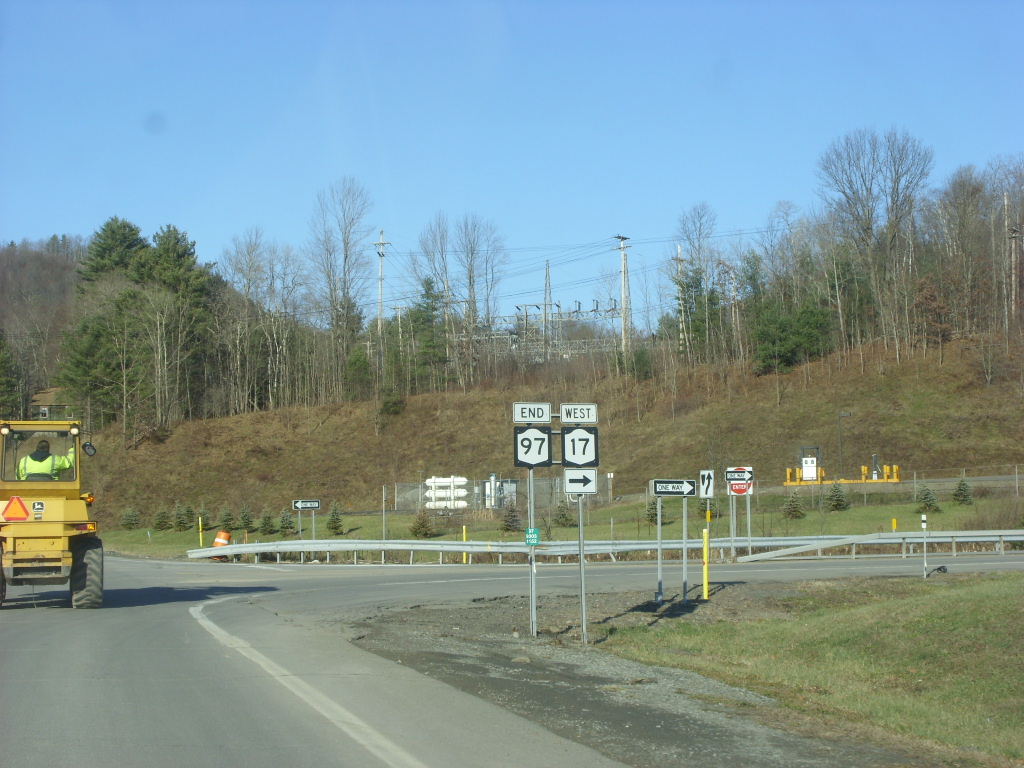
NY 97 at its northern terminus, the ramps from exit 87 of NY 17 (future I-86) in Hancock

Pea Brook consists of a few homes and upon leaving, NY 97 returns to the two-lane woods road it was beforehand. Just before a junction with Klondike Road and Swope Road, NY 97 bends westward once again, entering the hamlet of French Woods. In French Woods, NY 97 passes south of French Woods Golf and Country Club and enters the hamlet of Peas Eddy. In Peas Eddy, NY 97 bends southwest and south alongside Somerset Lake. After Somerset Lake, the route bends northwest and returns to the railroad tracks and the Delaware River in the hamlet of Stockport. At the junction with Stockport Road, NY 97 gains the moniker and becomes a two-lane residential street. A short distance later, NY 97 enters the village of Hancock. In Hancock, NY 97 becomes a two-lane commercial street, paralleling the railroad tracks into the downtown section after crossing the East Branch of the Delaware River.

In downtown Hancock, NY 97 intersects with the southern terminus of NY 268 (East Front Street). NY 97 takes a two block turn to the west before intersecting with Reed Street, where it heads one block north. NY 97 then turns west onto West Main Street, proceeding as a two-lane residential street. NY 97 intersects with Pennsylvania Avenue, which connects NY 97 to the Delaware River and a bridge crossing to PA 191. After leaving the village, NY 97 becomes a two-lane commercial street, intersecting with Sands Creek Road. There, NY 97 turns northward and enters exit 87 of New York State Route 17 (future I-86) (the Quickway). The northern ramps of the interchange serve as the northern terminus of NY 97 while Sands Creek Road continues north as CR 67 to NY 10 at the Cannonsville Reservoir.

== History ==
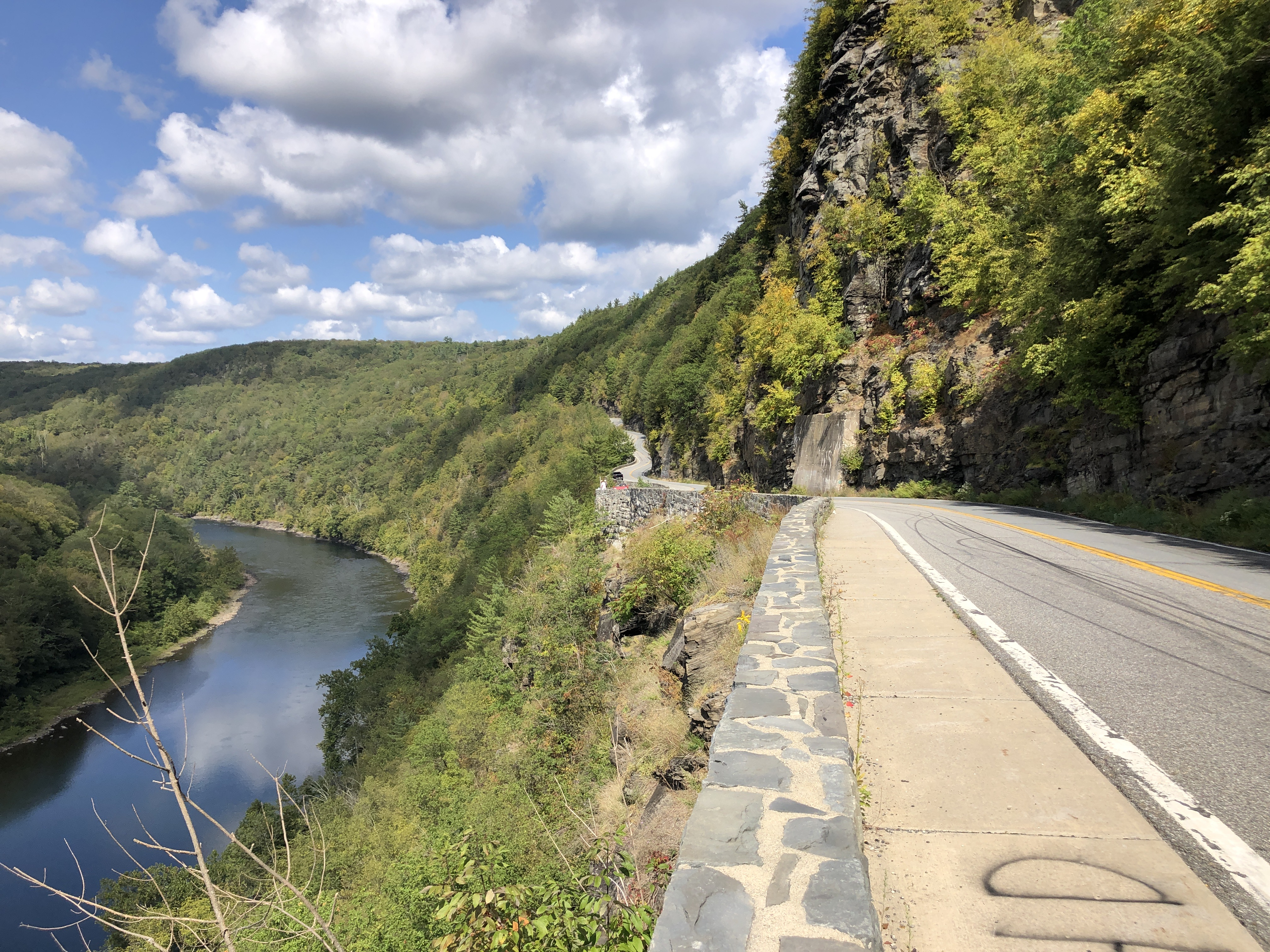
NY 97 atop the cliffs alongside the Delaware River in Hawk's Nest

The Delaware River corridor had been linked by a road along the cliffs overlooking the river since at least 1851. Part of it was constructed in the early 1800s as part of the Newburgh and Chenango Turnpike, chartered in 1805 to create a road from the Newburgh and Cochecton Turnpike up the Delaware River to Hancock, thence to Deposit, Bainbridge, and Oxford. When the plans for a new highway through the corridor of NY 97 were initially drawn up, it was to bypass what became the Hawk's Nest in favor of a shoreline route. However, the Erie Railroad refused to sell the necessary right-of-way, forcing the state to construct the improved road along the cliffside instead.

In 1911, the New York State Legislature created Route 3-a, an unsigned legislative route extending from the Pennsylvania state line at Port Jervis to Route 4 (later NY 17) in Hancock along the Delaware River. Very little of this highway actually existed in reality; by 1920, only 3.69 miles (5.94 km) of the 62.27-mile (100.21 km) long route had been built. In the 1930 renumbering of state highways in New York, the segment of former Route 3-a from Port Jervis to Callicoon was designated as NY 97, even though two sections of the route—between NY 42 at Sparrow Bush and Mongaup and from Pond Eddy to near the hamlet of Tusten—were still incomplete. The remainder of old Route 3-a north of Callicoon, which was fully constructed by 1930, became part of NY 17B. In 1932, then-Governor Franklin D. Roosevelt signed legislation designating NY 97 as the "Upper Delaware Scenic Byway".

In May 1939, the rest of future-NY 97 was proposed by the New York State Highway Department to become NY 17L from Hancock to Bradley's Corners. The Orange County Chamber of Commerce wanted one designation for the entire stretch of highway from Hancock to Port Jervis, which shared NY 97. NY 17B, NY 84 and US 6. NY 17L was chosen to provide an alternate to NY 17 for motorists who wanted to avoid the busy highway. The Route Ninety-Seven Council had been created several months prior to advocate for designating the entire road as NY 97. They opposed the decision for NY 17L, preferring to keep NY 97 to help travelers. Walter Schwartz, the chairman of the highway committee for Sullivan County's Board of Supervisors, announced on May 12 that he would discuss with the state about the NY 17L/NY 97 ordeal. On June 28, the state announced that they were dropping the NY 17L designation and the entire route would be designated as NY 97.

On August 30, 1939, the entirety of NY 97 was officially opened to traffic. Several events were held to mark the road's opening, including a ribbon-cutting ceremony in Port Jervis featuring the mayors of Port Jervis and Hancock and a motorcade procession that traveled the length of the highway. In all, it cost $4 million (equivalent to $92.6 million in 2025) to build NY 97. The portion through the Hawk's Nest cost $2 million (equivalent to $46.3 million in 2025) to construct. Following the road's completion, NY 97 was extended north to Hancock, overlapping NY 17B. The overlap was eliminated in the mid-1960s when NY 17B was truncated to Callicoon.

Near Cochecton, a historical marker points out that NY 97 passes the rock claimed by New Jersey colonists as the western end of the colony's northern border during the New York–New Jersey Line War in the 18th century. About a quarter of the route follows the old Delaware and Hudson Canal.

== Major intersections ==
County	Location	mi	km	Destinations	Notes
Orange	Port Jervis	0.00	0.00	US 6 / US 209 to I-84 – Port Jervis station NY 42 begins	Southern terminus; southern terminus of NY 42
Orange	Town of Deerpark	2.95	4.75	NY 42 north – Monticello	North end of NY 42 overlap; hamlet of Sparrow Bush
Sullivan	Town of Highland	18.33	29.50	NY 55 east / CR 11 / PA 434 south – Eldred	Western terminus of NY 55; northern terminus of PA 434; access to PA 434 via Barryville–Shohola Bridge; hamlet of Barryville
Sullivan	Tusten	32.18	51.79	NY 52 east – Monticello, Liberty	South end of NY 52 overlap
Sullivan	Tusten	32.93	53.00	NY 52 west / CR 24 to PA 652 west – Narrowsburg	North end of NY 52 overlap; hamlet of Narrowsburg
Sullivan	Cochecton	41.80	67.27	CR 114 west to PA 371 west	
Sullivan	Delaware	46.25	74.43	NY 17B east – Monticello	Western terminus of NY 17B; hamlet of Callicoon
Delaware	Village of Hancock	69.43	111.74	NY 268 north to NY 17 east	Southern terminus of NY 268
Delaware	Village of Hancock	70.12	112.85	To PA 191 south	Access via West Front Street
Delaware	Village of Hancock	70.54	113.52	Future I-86 / NY 17 – New York, Binghamton	Northern terminus; partial cloverleaf interchange; exit 87 on NY 17
1.000 mi = 1.609 km; 1.000 km = 0.621 mi: Concurrency terminus
