= Hawk's Nest (Orange County, New York) =

Scenic location in Orange County, New York

Coordinates: 41°25′04″N 74°44′06″W

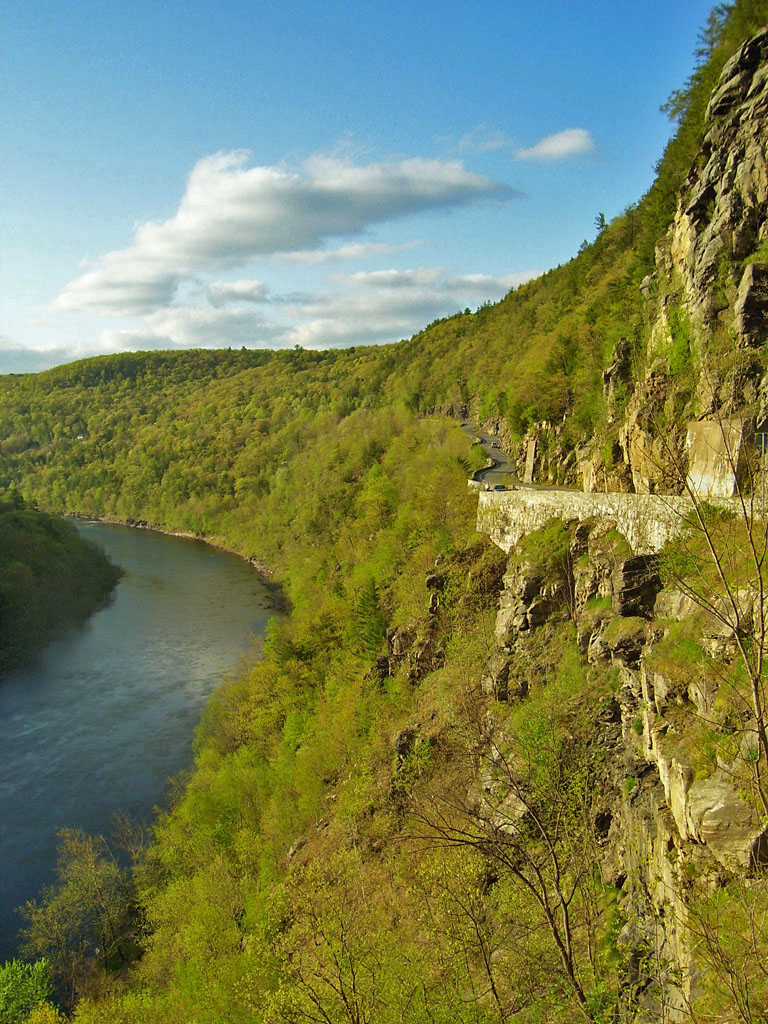
The retaining wall at the Hawk's Nest supports a scenic pull-out on New York State Route 97

The Hawk's Nest is a scenic overlook high above the Delaware River on New York State Route 97. It is located in Deerpark, Orange County, New York, just northwest of Port Jervis. Its name is derived from the birds of prey that nest in the area. The location is also known for its winding roads and scenic overlooks in the Delaware River Valley.

Route 97 was originally a one-lane dirt road built in 1859. It was paved between 1931–1933 and subsequently dedicated in 1939, and rededicated on September 21, 2002, as part of the "Upper Delaware Scenic Byway" (according to a historical marker).

== History ==
In the summer of 1874, the citizens of Monagaup sought to have a direct route over the mountains into the Bolton Basin (Sparrowbush area). The existing route went up the Mongaup River to near Bush Kill Creek with a trail to the Old Plank Road, which led down into Bolton Basin. This is a distance of 9 miles (14 km). The proposed route would eliminate 6 miles (9.7 km) from the trip. A route was inspected by 14 members of the community, which would be 6 miles (9.7 km) long and cost $5,000 to complete. In the spring of 1876, 124 men from Sparrowbush were hired at $1.00 a day to complete the work. The road was built 300 feet (91 m) above the Delaware and Hudson Canal down on the river bank. Within a week the first vehicle driven by H.H. Parnum traversed the construction site.

The New York State Highway System was expanded in 1911 under the Evans Delaware River Road Bill, adding the Port Jervis-Sullivan County-Hancock highway as Route 3-A. Later that year the road was widened to two lanes with the addition of stonewalls and guard rails.

== Gallery ==
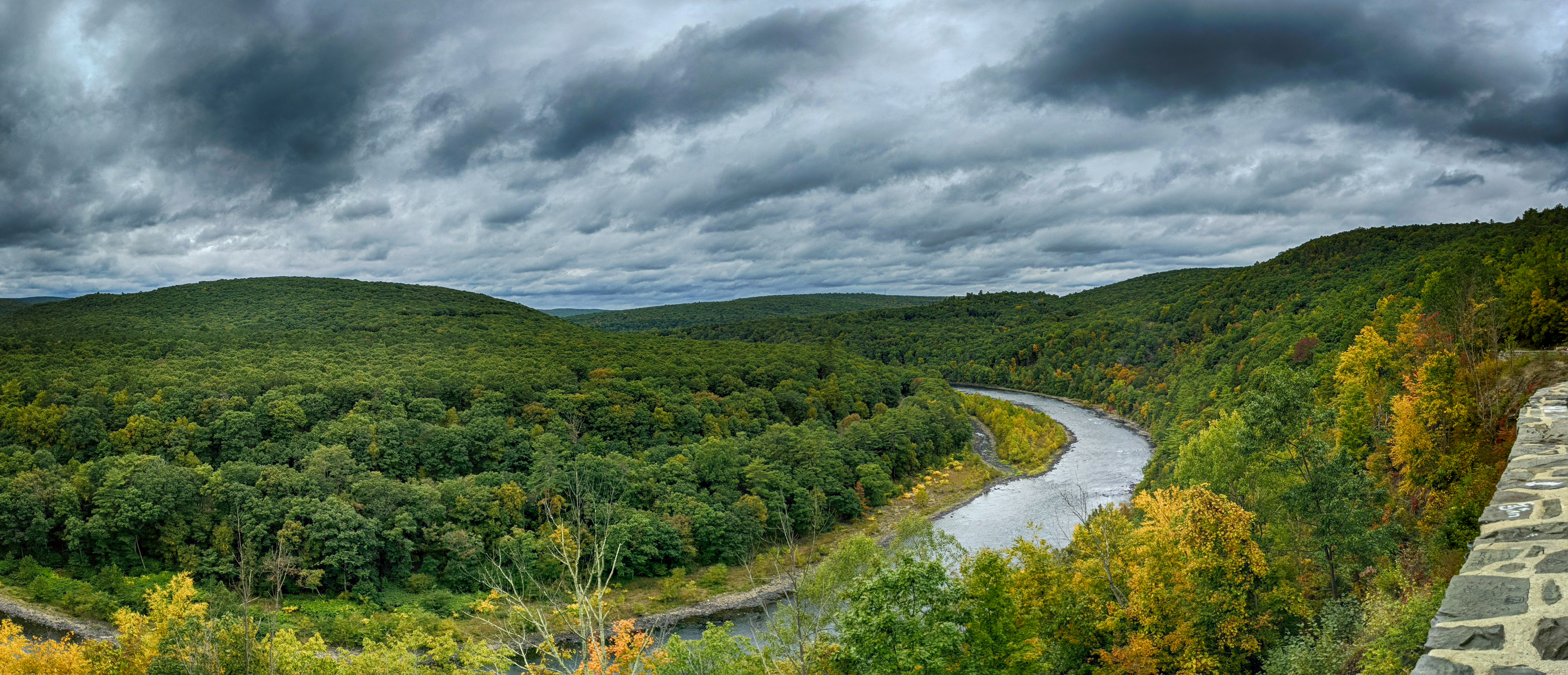
Delaware River from the Hawk's Nest

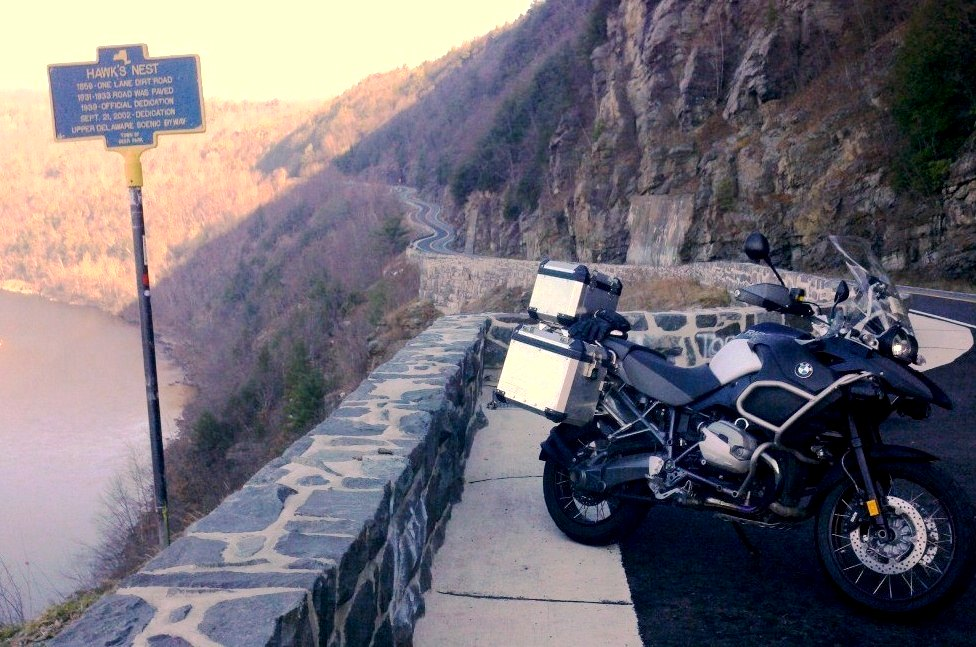
Hawks Nest

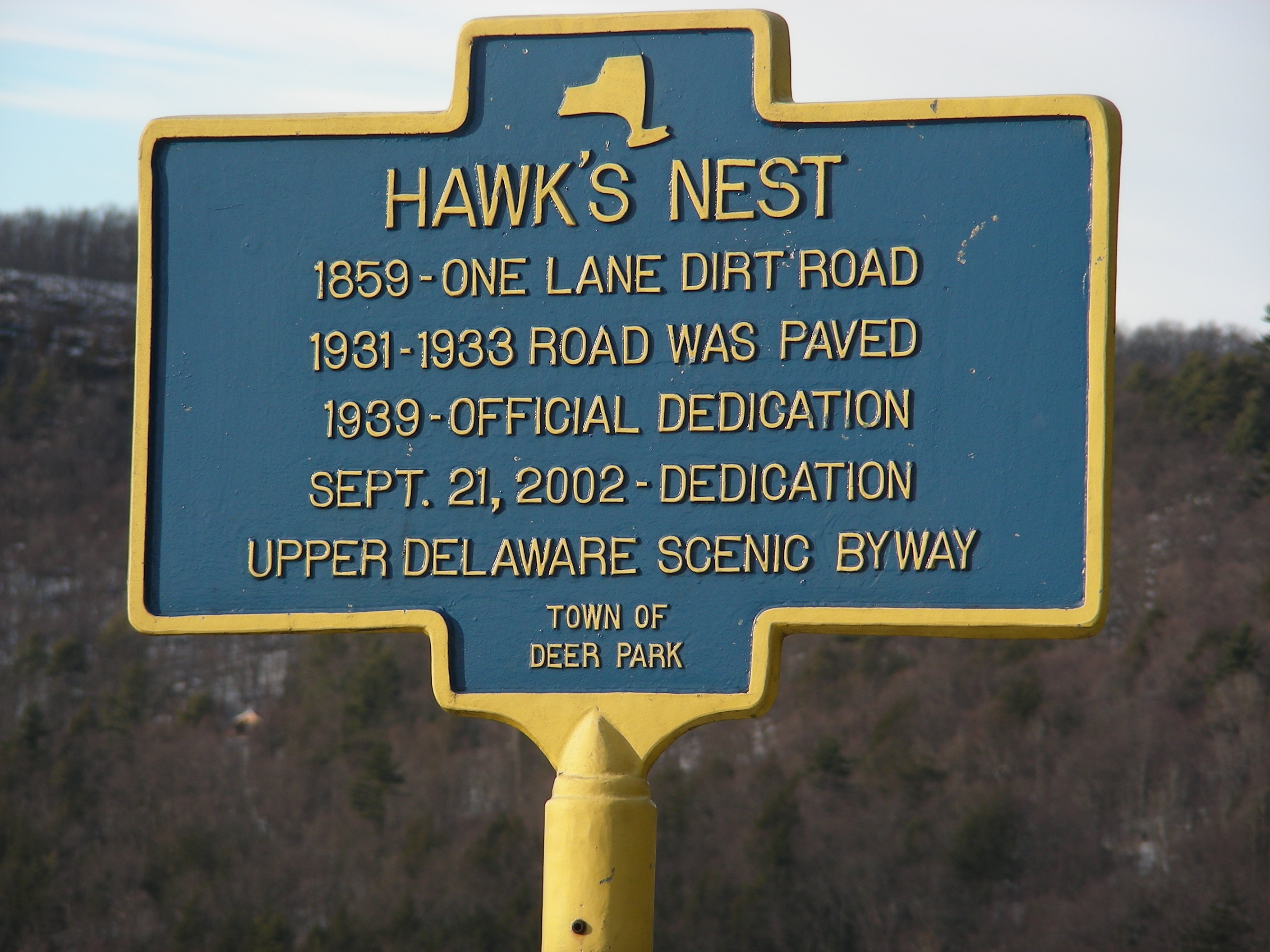
Historical marker

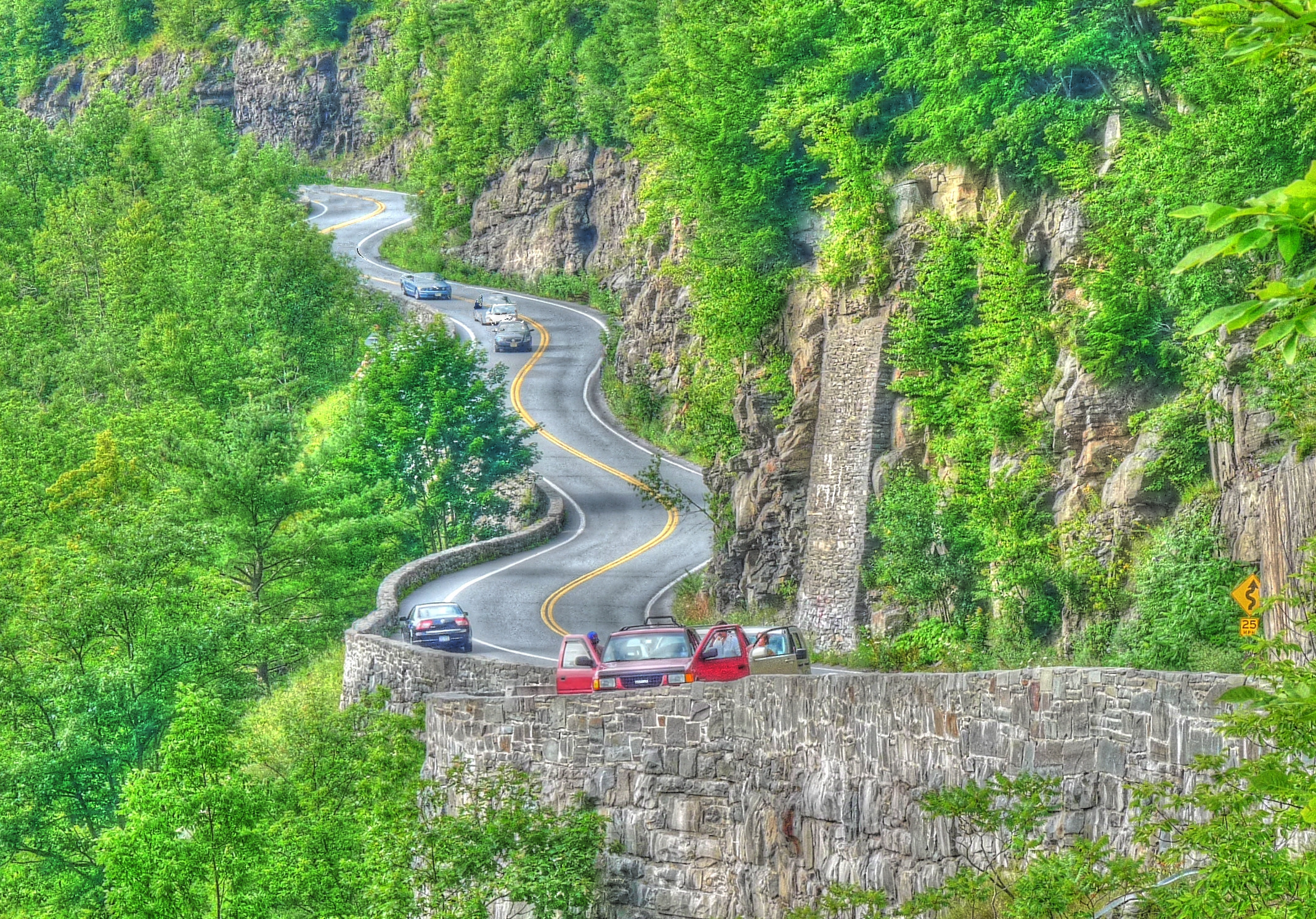
Hawk's Nest Road

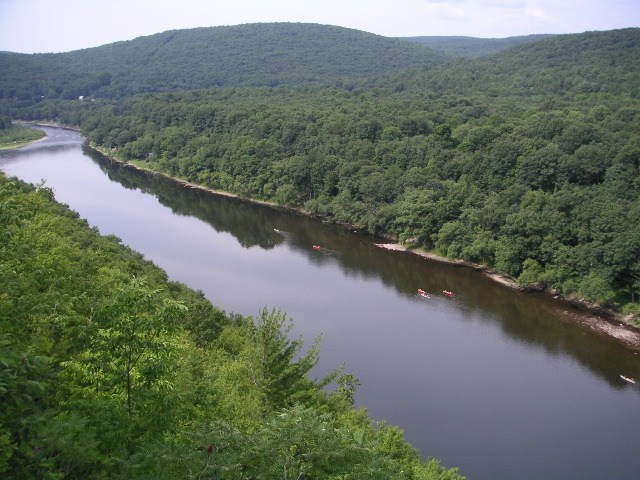
Delaware River
