= Harris, New York =

Harris
- hamlet
- Location within the state of New York
- Coordinates: 41°42′51″N 74°43′35″W
- Country: United States
- State: New York
- County: Sullivan
- Time zone: UTC-5 (Eastern (EST))
  - Summer (DST): UTC-4 (EDT)

Harris is a hamlet in the town of Thompson in east-central Sullivan County, New York, United States. The ZIP code for Harris is 12742.

Harris is a small community located off New York State Route 17 (future Interstate 86) off exit 102 between Liberty and Monticello. In its heyday, during the 1950s and 1960s, Harris was a thriving resort community of bungalow colonies, hotels and rooming houses. These included Maybergs Colony and Siegels Colony and Rooming House on Harris Road, Partners colony on Big Woods Road, Victory Colony on Big Woods Road, Others included Betty D's Rooming House (replacing Siegel's), the Turey Hotel, the Louis Herskovitz Bungalow Colony, Princeton House and many others. There was a large lake present upstream of a large Dam with Waterfall on the East Mongaup River located on Mayberg's colony. During the summer months, a number of stores formed a small "downtown" area near the intersection of Harris Road and Big Woods Road.

Today, the hamlet still contains a number of bungalow colonies. It is also the location of the Garnet Health's main hospital in the Catskills (as opposed to the smaller hospital in the western part of Sullivan County in Callicoon), and is the home of the Center for Discovery, a community for disabled residents that is also the largest employer in Sullivan County.
