= New York State Route 17 =

Highway in the Southern Tier of New York

New York State Route 17
- Map of NY 17: segments concurrent with I-86 in red, non-Interstate segments in blue, section extending into Pennsylvania in pink

Route information
- Maintained by NYSDOT and NYSTA
- Length: 396.84 mi (638.65 km)
- Existed: 1924–present

Major junctions
- West end: I-86 at the Pennsylvania state line in Mina
- US 62 in Kennedy; US 219 in Seneca Nation Territory; I-390 in Avoca; I-99 / US 15 / NY 417 in Corning; US 220 in South Waverly, PA; I-81 / US 11 in Binghamton; US 209 in Wurtsboro; I-84 in Middletown; Future I-86 / US 6 / NY 32 in Woodbury
- South end: I-87 / I-287 / New York Thruway / Route 17 at the New Jersey state line in Suffern

Location
- Country: United States
- State: New York
- Counties: Chautauqua, Cattaraugus, Allegany, Steuben, Chemung, Bradford (PA), Tioga, Broome, Delaware, Sullivan, Orange, Rockland

Highway system
- New York Highways; Interstate; US; State; Reference; Parkways
← NY 16	→ NY 17A

New York State Route 17 (NY 17) is a major state highway that extends for 397 miles (638.91 km) through the Southern Tier and Downstate regions of New York in the United States. It begins at the Pennsylvania state line in Mina and runs east as a limited-access highway, following the Southern Tier Expressway to Binghamton and the Quickway from Binghamton east to Woodbury. At Woodbury, the route turns south to become a local arterial, eventually following the Orange Turnpike to the New Jersey state line near Suffern. The portion of NY 17 west of Woodbury is in the process of being upgraded to Interstate 86, and as of February 2025, the routes are concurrent from the Pennsylvania border to Vestal and from Kirkwood to Windsor.

At 397 miles (639 km), NY 17 is the longest state route in New York, and is the second-longest highway of any kind in the state, behind only the New York State Thruway. It serves 11 counties, passes through the cities of Salamanca, Olean, Corning, Elmira, and Binghamton, and enters the vicinity of several others, including Jamestown and Middletown. As it proceeds across the state, it intersects many of New York's major Interstate and U.S. Highways, including U.S. Route 219 (US 219) in Salamanca, I-390 in Avoca, I-99 and US 15 near Corning, I-81 and US 11 in Binghamton, I-84 and US 6 near Middletown, and I-87 in Woodbury. Aside from a brief concurrency with the Thruway near Hillburn, the route is maintained by the New York State Department of Transportation, including a portion in the vicinity of Waverly that is physically located in Pennsylvania.

Initially part of an auto trail called the Liberty Highway, the route was added to the state highway system in 1924, extending from Westfield to Suffern via at-grade highways. As traffic demand surged, it was moved onto the Quickway and the Southern Tier Expressway as limited-access sections of both were completed from the 1950s to the 1990s. In 1998, all of NY 17 between the Pennsylvania state line and Woodbury was designated as "Future I-86". The westernmost 177 miles (285 km) of the route was designated as I-86 one year later, and the designation has been gradually extended eastward as sections of NY 17 were improved to Interstate Highway standards. Prior to the I-86 designation, NY 17 was part of a multi-state Route 17 along with New Jersey Route 17 and the former Pennsylvania Route 17.

== Route description ==
=== Pennsylvania to Elmira ===
Route marker used along the Southern Tier Expressway

NY 17 begins as a freeway at the point where I-86 crosses the New York–Pennsylvania border in Mina, Chautauqua County. I-86 heads westward from there to its western terminus at I-90. I-86 and NY 17 continue eastward through the Southern Tier, encountering NY 426 (exit 4) a short distance from the state line prior to meeting NY 76 (exit 6) south of Sherman. East of exit 8 (NY 394), I-86 and NY 17 cross Chautauqua Lake and follow the lake shore eastward to Jamestown, where it connects to NY 60 at exit 12 due north of the city. East of the city, the freeway meets US 62 at exit 14 and is joined by the old Erie Railroad line, which parallels the freeway as it heads across southern New York.

Between exits 17 and 18 (NY 280), I-86 and NY 17 cross the Allegheny Reservoir near its northernmost extent. Past NY 280, the freeway runs adjacent to the northern extent of the Allegany State Park and follows the reservoir and the connecting Allegheny River eastward to Salamanca. Near downtown Salamanca, I-86 and NY 17 meet US 219 (exit 21). US 219 joins the freeway east to exit 23 near Carrollton, where it splits from I-86 and NY 17 and heads toward Bradford, Pennsylvania, forming the eastern edge of the state park as it heads south. Meanwhile, the freeway continues east to Olean, where it meets NY 417 (a previous alignment of NY 17) at exit 24 west of town and NY 16 (exit 27) north of the area.

Past Olean, the route drifts northward away from Pennsylvania toward Hornell, where I-86 and NY 17 intersect NY 36 (exit 34). To the east in Avoca, the Southern Tier Expressway meets I-390 at exit 36. I-86 and NY 17 southeast from the junction, passing through Bath on its way an interchange with I-99 and US 15 in Painted Post (exit 44). Here, I-99 and US 15 begin and head south toward Pennsylvania, while I-86 and NY 17 continue east through Corning to the city of Elmira.

=== Elmira to Harriman ===
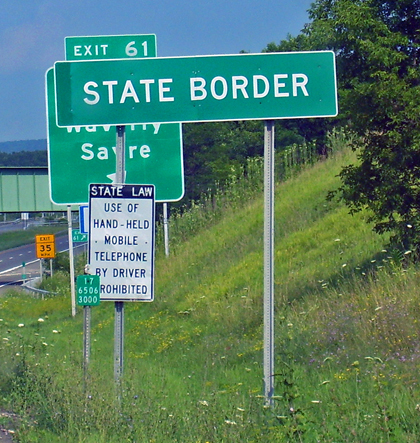
Sign along eastbound NY 17 marking return to New York after its brief foray into Pennsylvania

From Elmira to Binghamton, NY 17, the Erie Railroad (now operated by Norfolk Southern as the Southern Tier Line), and its old alignments generally stay close together. They follow the Chemung River to exit 60 (US 220 in South Waverly, Pennsylvania) and the Susquehanna River from east of exit 61 (Waverly, New York) to Binghamton; on the latter section, both NY 17C and NY 434 are old NY 17. Between the two rivers, which intersect in Pennsylvania, the general corridor runs just north of the state line in New York. NY 17 itself crosses into Pennsylvania for approximately 1 mile (1.6 km) between a point west of exit 60 and a point west of exit 61; additionally, all the ramps at exit 60 and portions of the eastbound ramps at exits 59A and 61 are in Pennsylvania. Despite being in Pennsylvania, it is still signed as NY 17, and these roadways are still maintained by the New York State Department of Transportation. At the Tioga County line near Waverly, I-86 temporarily terminates as NY 17 continues eastward toward Binghamton.

Near downtown Binghamton, NY 17 goes around the side of Prospect Mountain at what is locally known as "kamikaze curve". Heading eastbound, the freeway curves sharply left around the hillside, splits into ramps to I-81 north and south, and curves right to merge into I-81 south as it passes over the Chenango River. From that point east and southeast about 5 miles (8.0 km), I-81 and NY 17 run concurrently. NY 17 splits from I-81, the Erie Railroad and the Susquehanna River to the east into Stilson Hollow; from this split (exit 75) to its end, most of NY 17 does not follow the Erie Railroad, which crosses into Pennsylvania several times.

At the end of Stilson Hollow, NY 17 heads over a summit and into the valley formed by the Occanum Creek. The creek empties into the Susquehanna River at Windsor (exit 79), which NY 17 follows southeast to Damascus (exit 80) before turning northeast along Tuscarora Creek. It soon turns east and southeast over a summit, rejoining the Erie Railroad just north of Gulf Summit. The highway and railroad head east along Oquaga Creek to Deposit (exit 84), where they turn southeast along the West Branch Delaware River, where NY 17 briefly becomes an arterial road. A gap in the freeway stretches from here to just short of Hancock (exit 87), the place the West Branch joins with the East Branch Delaware River. The Erie Railroad continues southeast along the combined Delaware River, while NY 17 turns east along the valley formed by the East Branch, either closely following or built directly over the abandoned New York, Ontario and Western Railway to Liberty.

At East Branch (exit 90), the East Branch Delaware River turns north, and NY 17 continues east with the Beaver Kill to Roscoe (exit 94), Willowemoc Creek to Livingston Manor (exit 96), and Little Beaver Kill to Parksville (exit 98). The highway and parallel NYO&W pass south over a summit to Liberty (exits 99–100), and continue along the Middle Mongaup River to Ferndale (exit 101). The NYO&W turned east there, but NY 17 continues south over a summit and into the Spring Brook and East Mongaup River valleys past Harris (exit 102). NY 17 then cuts southeast cross-country to Monticello (exit 104; passing Monticello Raceway) and beyond, following the old Newburgh and Cochecton Turnpike (old NY 17) to Bloomingburg (exit 116). The old Middletown and Wurtsboro Turnpike, also old NY 17, and partially NY 17M, runs south to Middletown, which NY 17 cuts cross-country to bypass to the east, rejoining NY 17M – and the main line of the Erie Railroad – at Goshen (exit 123). NY 17, its old former alignment (NY 17M) and the Erie run generally east-southeast, partly cross-country and partly through small stream valleys, to the end of the freeway, the directional change in NY 17 from east–west to north–south, and the junction of the Erie with its branch to Newburgh.

=== Harriman to New Jersey ===
NY 17 heads southwest from the Quickway as a surface road, passing through the village of Woodbury before entering the village of Harriman, where it intersects with the eastern terminus of NY 17M. As the route heads southward from this junction, its signage changes from being east or west to north or south. The route parallels the Thruway as it proceeds through a disjointed piece of Harriman State Park and enters the town of Tuxedo. While inside the park, NY 17 intersects Arden Valley Road, a parkway that connects to Seven Lakes Drive deep inside the park. South of Arden Valley Road, NY 17 briefly exits Harriman State Park and enters the hamlet of Southfields, where it intersects with County Route 19 (CR 19) and passes by the Red Apple Rest, a former restaurant and roadside attraction.

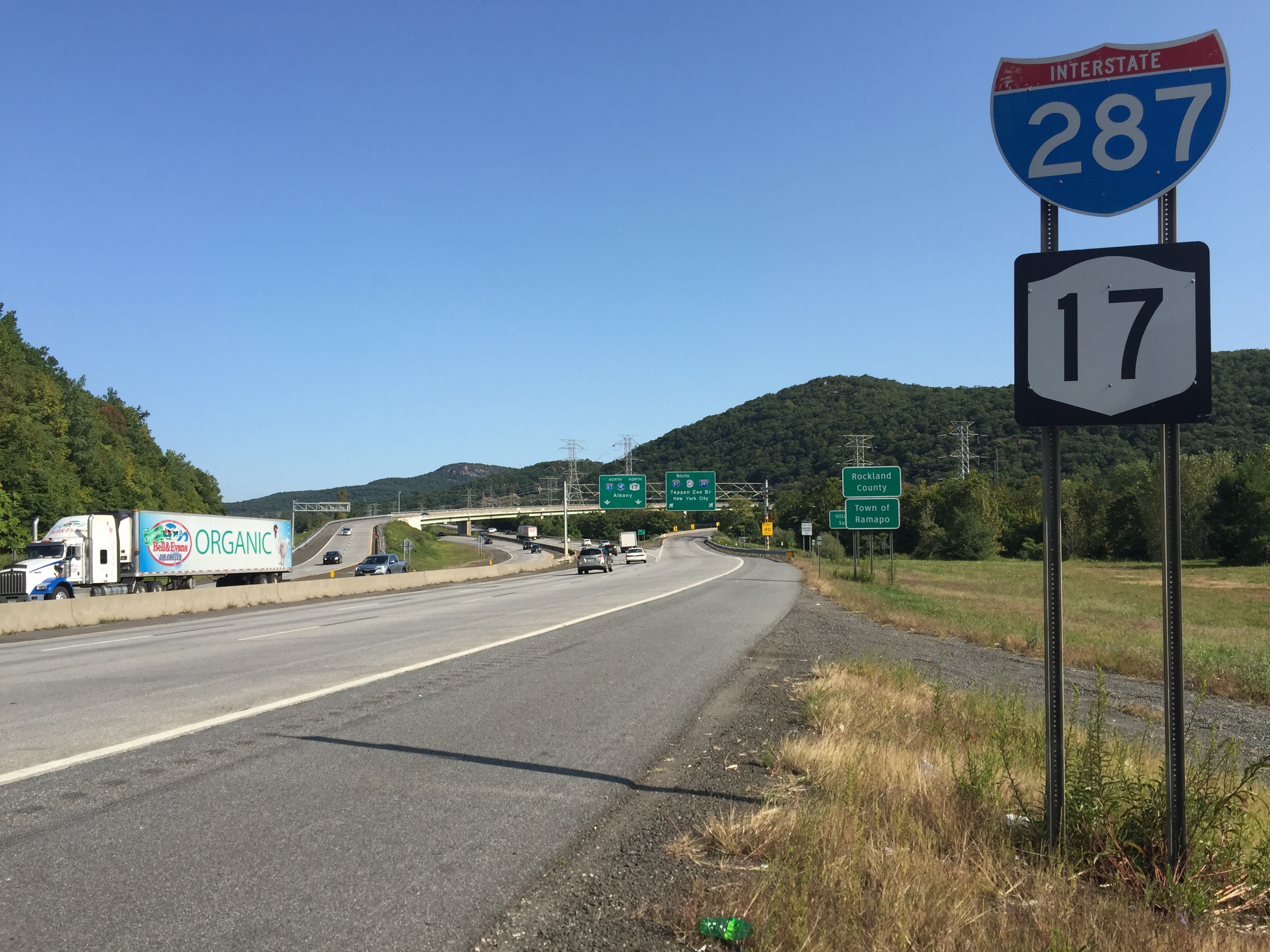
View north along NY 17 and I-287 as it enters New York from New Jersey

Past the hamlet, the route heads back into the park and intersects with NY 17A and CR 106 near the park's western boundary. South of the junction, NY 17 leaves the park and proceeds through a lightly populated area to the village of Tuxedo Park. At the Tuxedo Park train station is access to some hiking trails in Harriman State Park. The route continues on, paralleling the Thruway into Rockland County. On the other side of the county line, NY 17 enters the village of Sloatsburg, where it meets Seven Lakes Drive and connects to CR 72 by way of a modified trumpet interchange.

Outside of Sloatsburg, NY 17 becomes a four-lane expressway and winds its way southeasterly along the Ramapo River and the Thruway through the town of Ramapo to the hamlet of the same name, based just north of NY 17's junction with NY 59. Here, NY 17 turns to the southwest, merging onto the Thruway southbound at exit 15A, traversing a sparsely developed area of the village of Hillburn. About 0.75 miles (1.21 km) south of merging onto the Thruway, NY 17 passes to the south of the village center as it approaches I-287. At exit 15A for New Jersey, NY 17 leaves the Thruway and merges with I-287 southbound and proceeds to the New Jersey state line, where it connects to New Jersey's Route 17. An old alignment of NY 17 in Hillburn, now called Old Route 17 used to go around the Thruway instead of merging onto it.

== History ==
=== Origins ===
==== Before the automobile ====
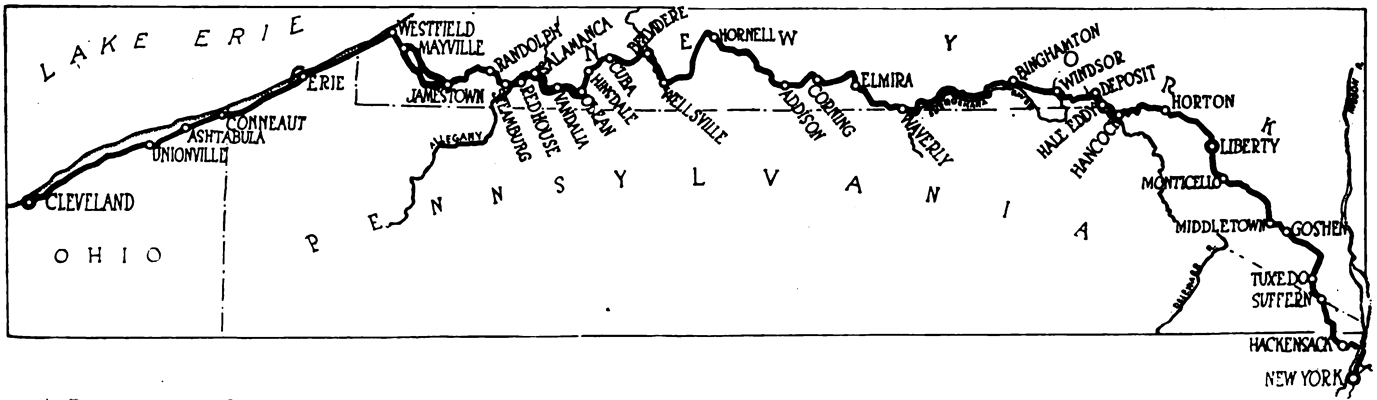
Map of the Liberty Highway

From Binghamton to Corning, NY 17 follows the course of the Great Bend and Bath Turnpike, which was legislated in 1808 to continue the Cochecton and Great Bend Turnpike (US 11) through the Susquehanna Valley. The road ran from the Pennsylvania state line at Great Bend through Binghamton, Owego, and Elmira to Bath. In its day, it was a major route of travel through the Susquehanna Valley. Today, the road is designated US 11 from Pennsylvania to Binghamton, then NY 17C to Waverly, NY 352 into Corning, and NY 415 to Bath. The at-grade sections of NY 17 in Orange County follow the Orange Turnpike south of Southfields and the New Windsor and Cornwall Turnpike to its north.

==== Liberty Highway and Legislative Route 4 ====
The original routing of NY 17, from Westfield to Harriman, was largely designated in 1908 by the New York State Legislature as Route 4, an unsigned legislative route. This routing was incorporated in 1918 as the main portion of an auto trail called the Liberty Highway, which connected New York City to Cleveland via Hackensack, Liberty, the Southern Tier, and Erie.

Legislative Route 4 began at legislative Route 18 (current US 20) in Westfield and proceeded southeast through Mayville to Jamestown on what is now NY 394 and NY 430. From there, the route headed generally eastward to Salamanca over modern NY 394, NY 242, and NY 353, and southeast to Olean via NY 417. At Olean, the route shifted northward, passing through Hinsdale, Friendship, and Belvidere on current NY 16, NY 446 and Allegany County's CR 20 before returning southward on what is now NY 19 to access the village of Wellsville.

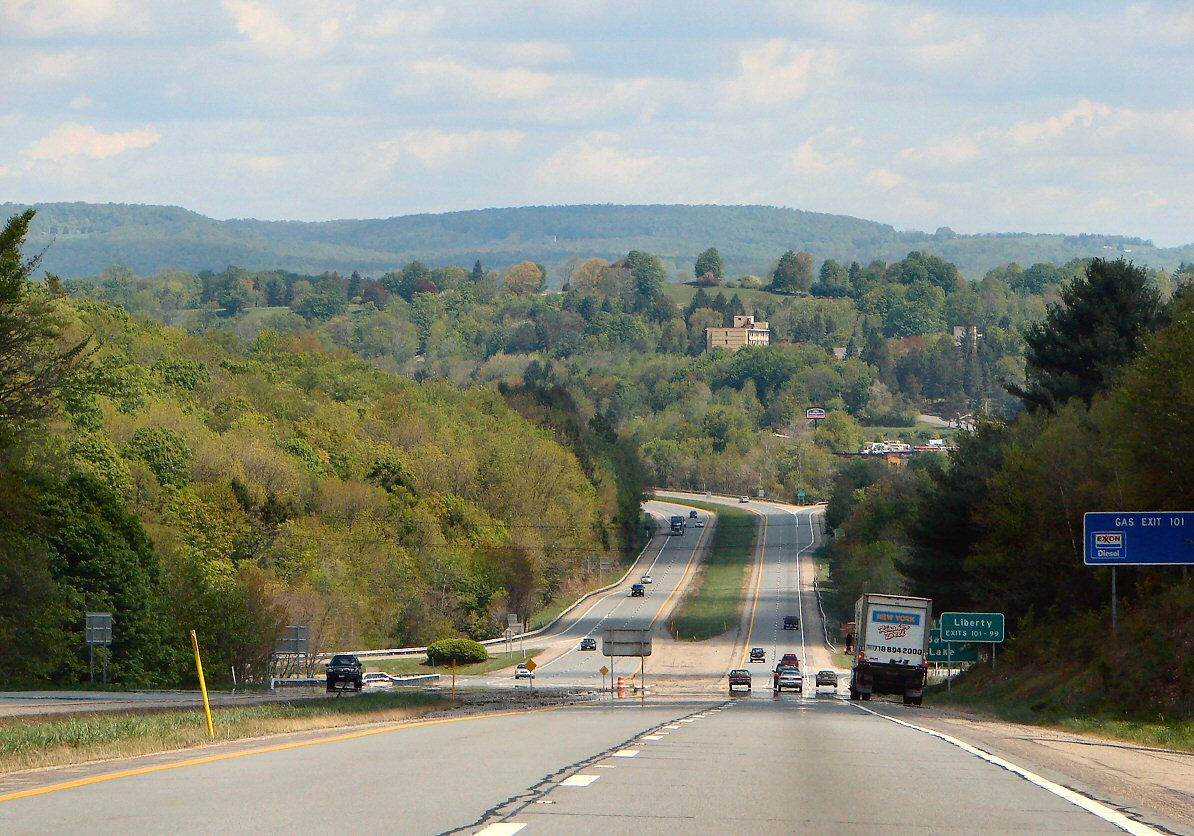
NY 17 at Liberty, New York

From Wellsville to Andover and from Jasper to Corning, Route 4 followed modern NY 417. In between Andover and Jasper, however, Route 4 veered north on current NY 21 and NY 36 to serve Hornell. East of Corning, the alignment of legislative Route 4 ran along the Great Bend and Bath Turnpike, and more closely resembled the modern alignments of the Southern Tier Expressway and the Quickway. Route 4 exited Corning on what is now NY 352 and followed it to Big Flats, where it broke from NY 352 and proceeded to Horseheads on Chemung CR 64 and to Elmira on what is now Lake Road, Madison Avenue and the east end of NY 352. Between Elmira and Binghamton, Route 4 followed either local roads that were bypassed or upgraded into the Southern Tier Expressway, namely modern NY 17 and Chemung and Tioga CR 60 from Elmira to Waverly, NY 17C between Waverly and Owego, NY 434 from Owego to Vestal, and NY 17C and Riverside Drive (via NY 26) from Vestal to Binghamton.

Route 4 exited the city on US 11 and followed it to Kirkwood Center, a hamlet adjacent to the eastern junction of NY 17 and I-81. From this point to Harriman, except for one section near Middletown, the path Route 4 followed became the basis for the Quickway several decades later. Between Kirkwood Center and Hancock, Route 4 utilized what was later upgraded into the Quickway (via Broome CR 28 from Windsor to Deposit). East of here, it used parallel roads instead: modern "Old Route 17" (Delaware CR 17 and Sullivan CRs 179A to 174) from Deposit to Monticello, Sullivan CRs 173 to 171 between Monticello and Bloomingburg, and Orange CR 76 and NY 17M from Bloomingburg to Harriman. At Harriman, Route 4 broke from the Liberty Highway and proceeded northeast over current US 6 and NY 293 to Highland Falls, where it ended at legislative Route 3 (modern US 9W). The portion of the Liberty Highway between Suffern and Harriman became part of legislative Route 39-b in 1911; however, this designation was removed on March 1, 1921. Another auto trail, the West Shore Route, also followed this section of the Liberty Highway, but proceeded north from Harimman along modern-day NY 32.

=== Designation and early changes ===
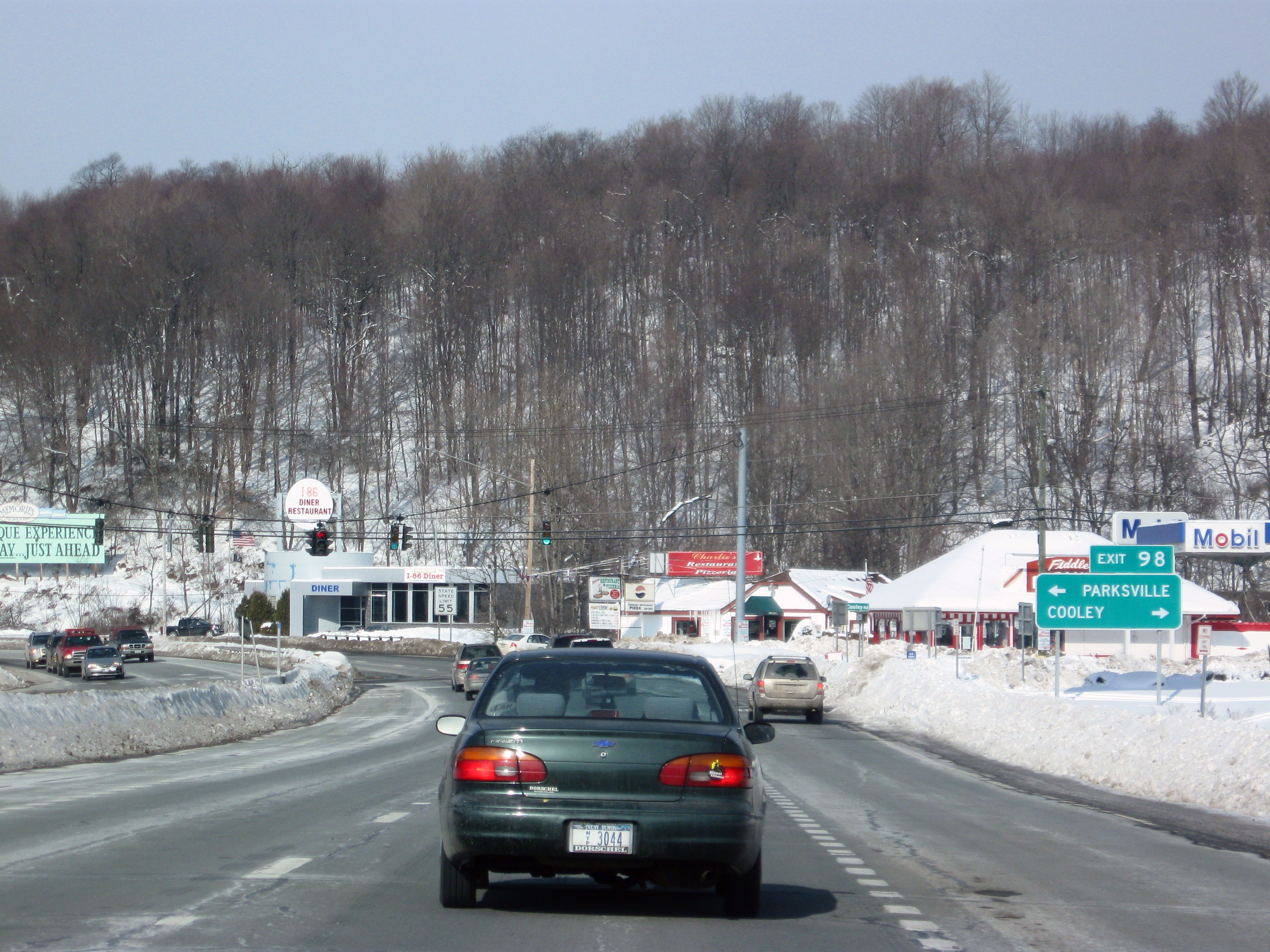
The original exit 98 was a signalized intersection in Parksville. A nearly 3-mile (4.8 km) bypass around the hamlet opened in 2011 to replace the junction.

When New York first signed its state highways with route numbers in 1924, much of legislative Route 4 was designated as NY 17. From Randolph to Salamanca, NY 17 followed the more southerly routing of the Liberty Highway instead of the Route 4 routing, bypassing Little Valley to the south in favor of a direct connection between Randolph and Salamanca (current NY 394 and NY 951T). In Vestal, NY 17 was routed along the south bank of the Susquehanna River, bypassing Endicott and Johnson City on what is now NY 434 and Broome CR 44. Lastly, NY 17 broke from the path of legislative Route 4 in Harriman and followed the former Route 39-b south to the New Jersey state line at Suffern. As originally laid out, NY 17 was 434 miles (698 km) long.

In the 1930 renumbering of state highways in New York, NY 17 basically remained intact. The only changes made at this time were the straightening out of the Olean–Wellsville segment (now via Ceres) and the Andover–Jasper segment (now via Greenwood).

NY 17 initially reached New Jersey by way of Suffern's Orange Avenue (now US 202) and connected to New Jersey's Route 2 at the state line. In 1932, an alternate route of NY 17 between the New Jersey state line at Hillburn and the hamlet of Ramapo on the western bank of the Ramapo River was designated as NY 339. The route largely followed the path of modern I-287 and the New York State Thruway between the two locations. It initially became a local road upon crossing into New Jersey; however, Route 2 was realigned c. 1933 to connect to NY 339 instead of NY 17.

In the mid-1930s, the alignments of NY 17 and NY 339 south of Ramapo were flipped, placing NY 17 on the western route.

In 1938, NY 17 was relocated onto a new highway through the Hillburn village limits. While the southern half of the new road utilized the old highway, the northern half veered to the west of both Hillburn and old NY 17, bypassing the village before rejoining the old road south of Ramapo.

=== Late 20th century conversion into expressway and later improvements ===
The explosive growth of the tourism industry in the Catskill Mountains region, which began in the 1930s and intensified after World War II, stretched the rural road to its limits. Scores of hotels, resorts and bungalow colonies attracted hundreds of thousands of vacationing New Yorkers, whose cars left the two-lane NY 17 hopelessly jammed in summer. Many towns, especially the fairly large city of Middletown, were paralyzed on Friday evenings and Sunday afternoons in the summertime, as traffic passed through local downtowns and their traffic lights. In addition, the tight turns and steep inclines along the route led to numerous fatal crashes, including two milk tanker truck crashes in the mid-1950s. In response, New York State officials planned a four-lane replacement, the first free long-distance expressway in the state and one of the earliest in the United States. It would replace intersections with well-spaced access ramps, separate grades with flyovers, and allow safe travel at up to 65 miles per hour (105 km/h).

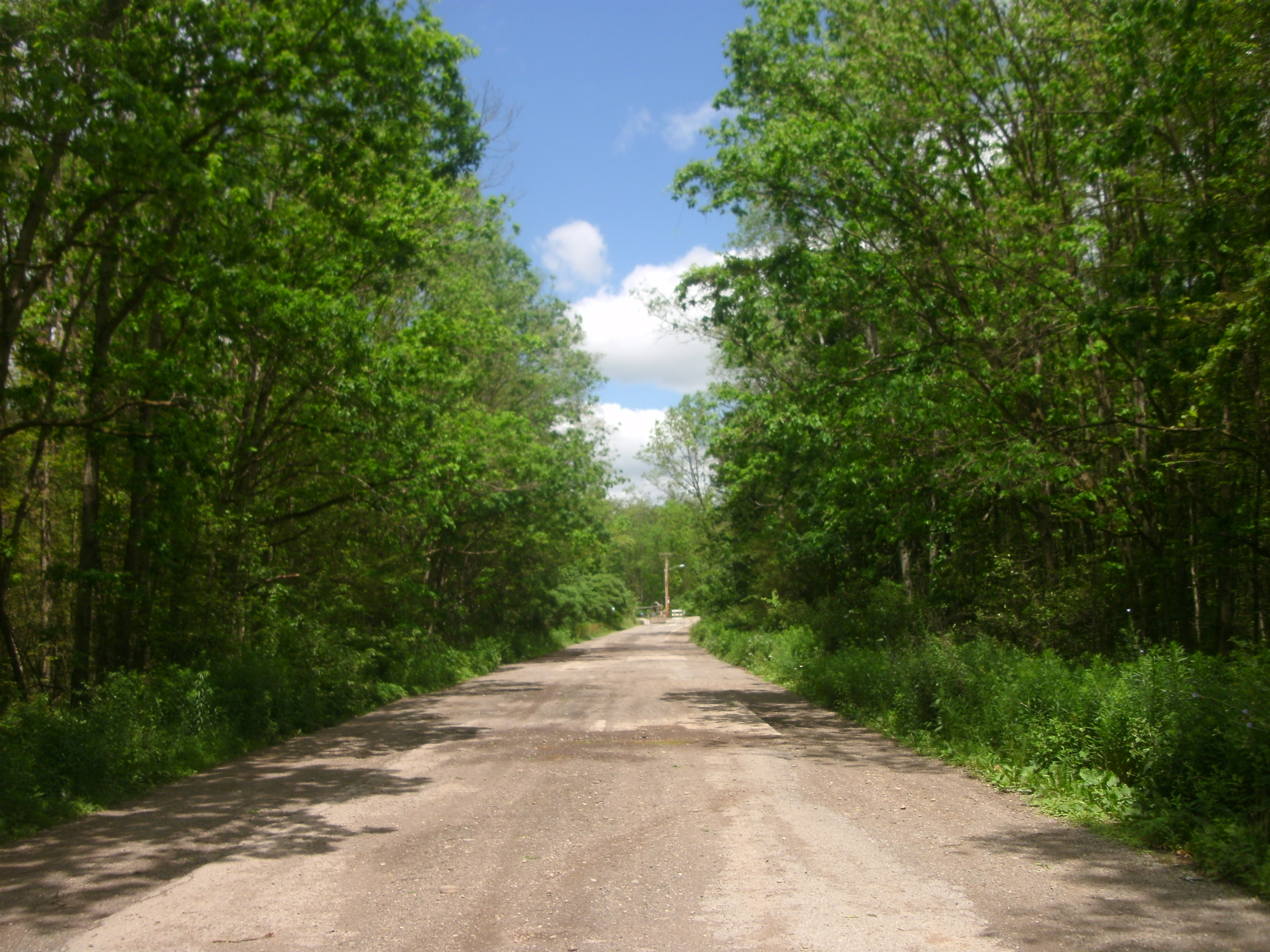
NY 17's former alignment in the town of Red House, abandoned and banned from traffic

The first segment of the new highway extended from Fair Oaks to Goshen, bypassing the city of Middletown to the northeast. It opened to traffic in July 1951 as a realignment of NY 17. As more sections of the freeway—known as the Quickway—opened up during the 1950s and 1960s, NY 17 was moved onto them. The Quickway was completed by 1968, connecting Binghamton to Harriman by way of a continuous expressway. Farther west, plans were also in the works to build an expressway across the Southern Tier. The highway was first proposed by New York Governor Thomas Dewey in 1953, and the first sections of the Southern Tier Expressway were completed in the mid-1960s. At the time, NY 17 followed the entirety of two of the four open sections (Steamburg to Salamanca and Owego to the Broome County line) and part of a third (Corning to Lowman via Elmira).

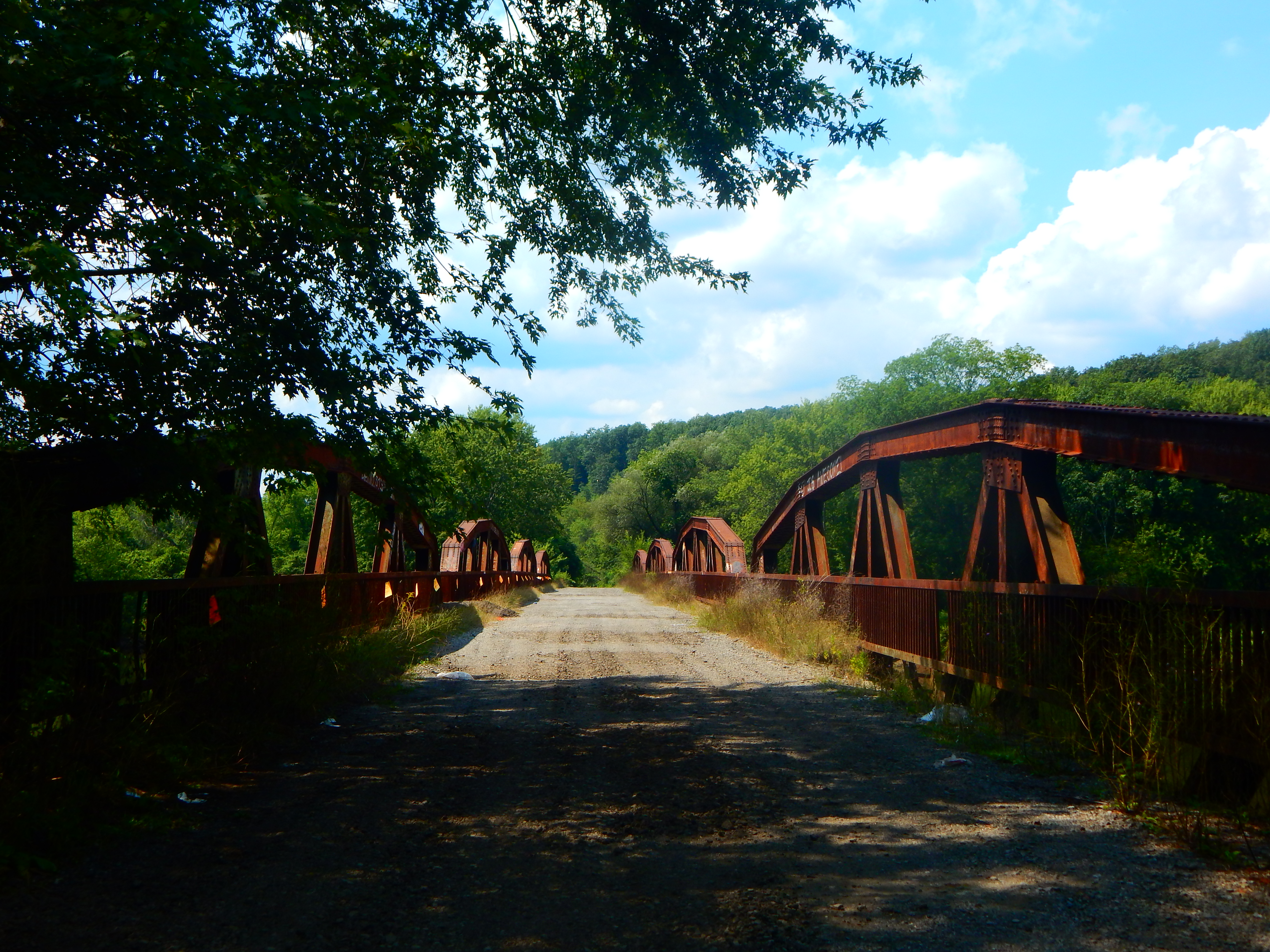
The bridge over the Allegheny River in Red House, due to be replaced

As more continuous pieces of the expressway opened during the 1970s, NY 17 was realigned onto them, with much of NY 17's old alignment becoming NY 394, NY 417, or NY 17C. By 1980, the expressway was complete from Bemus Point to Binghamton except for two areas near Salamanca and Corning. Although NY 17 continued to extend northwestward along its original alignment from Bemus Point to Westfield, both highways were also designated as parts of NY 430 and NY 394 in anticipation of the completion of the Southern Tier Expressway west of Chautauqua Lake, which NY 17 would be rerouted to follow. This segment was built in stages during the 1980s as a super two highway. The portions of the freeway in and around Salamanca and Corning were completed in the late 1980s and mid-1990s, completing the conversion of NY 17 into a continuous expressway from the Pennsylvania state line to Harriman.

In 1996, both exit 117 and exit 118A were closed.

The large portion of the road west of Chautauqua Lake was widened to four lanes as part of a project completed in 1997.

On December 3, 1999, the westernmost 177 miles (284.85 km) of NY 17 were replaced by I-86, a new route that had been written into law a year earlier. As legislated, I-86 will eventually extend eastward along the length of both the Southern Tier Expressway and the Quickway to the New York State Thruway in Harriman once both highways are brought up to Interstate Highway standards.

I-86 was extended east to Horseheads in 2004, and Elmira in 2008.

A 10-mile (16 km) stretch of NY 17 in central Broome County was designated as I-86 in 2006.

In September 2013, the Federal Highway Administration (FHWA) approved a 15.8-mile (25.4 km) extension of the I-86 designation from exit 56 in Elmira to the Tioga county line. The remainder of NY 17 west of I-87 was designated after the remaining at-grade sections are eliminated and the highway is brought up to Interstate Highway standards.

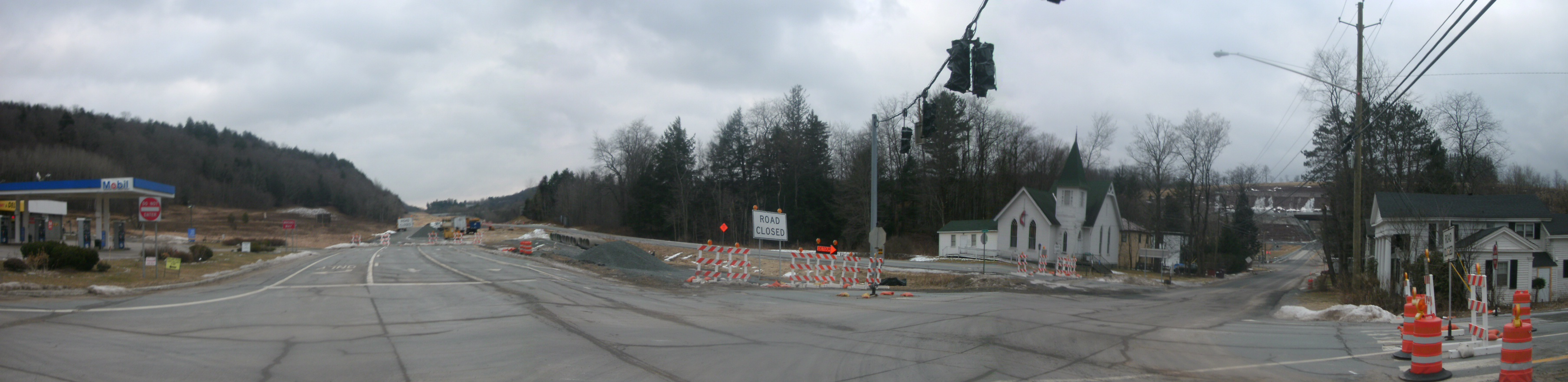
The former alignment of NY 17 through Parksville in February 2012, after construction of the bypass around the hamlet. Downtown Parksville is visible to the right.

The New York State Thruway Authority converted the Harriman Toll Barrier at the interchange of NY 17 and I-87 (exit 16 on I-87) to cashless tolling. This included the creation of a solar photovoltaic energy generating facility (solar park) to help power the toll and maintenance facilities in Harriman, Woodbury, Spring Valley, and Nyack. Cashless tolling began on the night of September 27, 2018. This was a part of Governor Andrew Cuomo's goal to convert the entirety of the New York Thruway to cashless tolling.

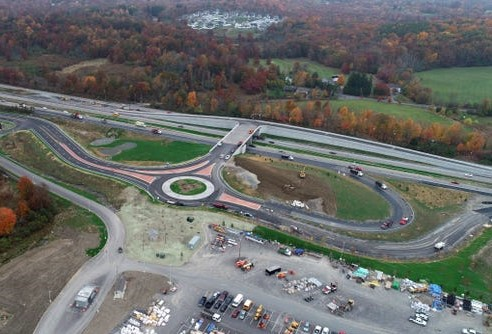
The new exit 125 before completion

On August 9, 2019, Governor Andrew Cuomo signed into law that a portion of NY 17 was to be designated the "Dennis 'Matt' Howe Memorial Highway" from exit 63 in the hamlet of Lounsberry to exit 62 in the village of Nichols. On March 18, 2019, Howe died from injuries sustained when a tractor-trailer collided with his DOT truck as he and others were performing highway safety work on NY 17. The signs were unveiled and the dedication ceremony was held on October 29, 2019.

In November 2019, NYSDOT completed the reconstruction of exit 131 along NY 17. As part of the project, a diverging diamond interchange was built at the exit to improve access between NY 17 and NY 32. Also as part of the project, NY 32 was widened to three lanes to each way; CR 64 / Nininger Road was extended to Woodbury Common Premium Outlets; and exit ramps were built from NY 32 north and NY 32 south to meet Nininger Road at two respective traffic circles. In addition, a new park-and-ride was built, and the ramp from NY 17 west to Woodbury Common was demolished.

In December 2020, NYSDOT completed construction of a new exit 125, which was built to accommodate the new Legoland New York. As part of the project, a four-ramp parclo was built, which replaced the prior exit 125, located 4,000 feet (1.2 km) west. NY 17 was expanded to three lanes in each direction between exits 124 and 125. Harriman Drive was expanded to two lanes in each direction between the exit and Legoland's entrance.

On November 14, 2024, NYSDOT announced the extension of the I-86 designation from exit 60 to exit 67 (NY 26) in Vestal.

== Future ==
=== Widening in Orange and Sullivan counties ===
NYSDOT has requested proposals for plans to widen NY 17 between the Thruway in Orange County and the town of Liberty in Sullivan County. The widening is supported by the 17-Forward-86 coalition, several state senators, and various businesses and organizations in the area.

New York State Department of Transportation wants to begin a $1.3 billion project in the Catskill Mountains section of the route.

== Major intersections ==
County	Location	mi	km	Exit	Destinations	Notes
Chautauqua	Mina	0.00	0.00	–	I-86 west – Erie	Continuation into Pennsylvania; western end of I-86 concurrency; former PA 17
see I-86
Broome	Vestal	237.00	381.41	67	NY 26 to NY 434 – Vestal, Endicott I-86 ends	Signed as exits 67S (south) and 67N (north); current eastern terminus of I-86
Broome	Vestal	238.00	383.02	68	Old Vestal Road	Eastbound exit and westbound entrance
Broome	Union	239.36	385.21	69	NY 17C east – Westover	Eastbound exit and entrance
Broome	Union	240.61	387.22	69	NY 17C west – Endwell	Westbound exit and entrance
Broome	Johnson City	241.43	388.54	70	NY 201 south – Johnson City, Shopping Mall	Signed as exits 70S (NY 201) and 70N (Mall); northern terminus of NY 201
Broome	Johnson City–Dickinson line	242.63	390.48	71	Airport Road – Greater Binghamton Airport, Johnson City	Signed as exits 71S (Johnson City) and 71N (Airport) westbound
Broome	Binghamton			72	Prospect Street / Mygatt Street	Westbound exit and entrance
Broome	Binghamton	244.78	393.94	72B	US 11 (Front Street) – Downtown Binghamton	Eastbound exit only
Broome	Binghamton	244.91	394.14	72A	I-81 north to I-88 east (NY 7 east) – Syracuse, Albany	Western end of I-81 concurrency; exit number not signed westbound
Broome	Binghamton	245.39	394.92	12	NY 7 – Binghamton, Port Dickinson	Access to NY 363 and Downtown Binghamton
Broome	Binghamton	245.78	395.54	11	Broad Avenue	Westbound exit and eastbound entrance
Broome	Kirkwood	249.07	400.84	9	To US 11 – Industrial Park	Eastbound exit and westbound entrance; access via Colesville Road
Broome	Kirkwood	249.62	401.72	75	I-81 south to US 11 – Scranton, Industrial Park I-86 begins	Access to US 11 via NY 990G; exit no. not signed eastbound; eastern end of I-81 concurrency; current western terminus of I-86
Broome	see I-86					
Broome	Village of Windsor	259.64	417.85	79	NY 79 – Windsor I-86 ends	Current eastern terminus of I-86
Broome	Windsor	261.39	420.67	80	Damascus	Access via CR 14/CR 28
Broome	Windsor	264.09	425.01	81	Earl Bosket Road	
Broome	Sanford	269.74	434.10	82	NY 41 – McClure, Sanford	Southern terminus of NY 41
Broome	Sanford	271.02	436.16	83	Deposit, Oquaga Lake	Access via CR 28
Delaware	Town of Deposit	274.32	441.48	84	NY 8 / NY 10 – Deposit, Walton	
Delaware	Town of Deposit			Eastern end of freeway section		
Delaware	Town of Hancock			Western end of freeway section		
Delaware	Village of Hancock	285.25	459.07	87	NY 97 to NY 268 / PA 191 – Hancock, Cadosia	Northern terminus of NY 97
Delaware	Town of Hancock			87A	NY 268 – Cadosia, Hancock	Westbound exit and eastbound entrance
Delaware	Town of Hancock	292.84	471.28	89	Fishs Eddy	Access via CR 17
Delaware	Town of Hancock	296.74	477.56	90	NY 30 – East Branch, Downsville	Southern terminus of NY 30
Delaware	Colchester	303.13	487.84	92	Horton, Cooks Falls	Access via CR 17
Delaware	Colchester	304.98	490.82	93	Cooks Falls	Westbound exit and eastbound entrance; access via CR 17
Sullivan	Rockland	310.37	499.49	94	NY 206 west – Roscoe, Walton, Lew Beach	Eastern terminus of NY 206
Sullivan	Rockland	316.36	509.13	96	Livingston Manor	Access via CR 81
Sullivan	Rockland	318.59	512.72	97	Morsston	Access via CR 178
Sullivan	Liberty	321	517	98	Parksville	Access via CR 84
Sullivan	Liberty	324.63	522.44	99	North Main Street (CR 176) – Liberty	
Sullivan	Liberty	326.12	524.84	100A	NY 52 west / NY 55 – Liberty	Westbound exit and eastbound entrance
Sullivan	Liberty	326.49	525.43	100B	NY 52 – Liberty	
Sullivan	Liberty	327.47	527.01	101	Ferndale, Swan Lake	No westbound entrance; access via CR 71/CR 175
Sullivan	Thompson	331.84	534.04	102	Harris, Bushville	Access via CR 174
Sullivan	Thompson	334.57	538.44	103	Rapp Road	Westbound exit and eastbound entrance
Sullivan	Monticello	335.91	540.59	104	NY 17B west – Raceway, Monticello	Eastern terminus of NY 17B
Sullivan	Monticello	337.26	542.77	105	NY 42 – Monticello, Kiamesha	Formerly signed as exits 105A (NY 42 south) and 105B (NY 42 north) until a new singular interchange was completed in 2024
Sullivan	Monticello	339.37	546.16	106	CR 173 (East Broadway)	
Sullivan	Thompson	340.55	548.06	107	Bridgeville, South Fallsburg	Access via CR 161
Sullivan	Thompson	342.41	551.06	108	Bridgeville	Eastbound exit and entrance; access via CR 173
Sullivan	Thompson	343.59	552.95	109	Rock Hill, Woodridge	Access via Rock Hill Drive/Katrina Falls Road
Sullivan	Thompson	343.99	553.60	110	Lake Louise Marie, Wanaksink Lake	Access via Lake Louise Marie/Wurtsboro Mountain Roads
Sullivan	Thompson	344.74	554.81	111	Wolf Lake	Eastbound exit and entrance; access via Wolf Lake Road
Sullivan	Mamakating	347.64	559.47	112	Masten Lake, Yankee Lake	Access via CR 166A
Sullivan	Mamakating	349.95	563.19	113	US 209 – Wurtsboro, Ellenville	
Sullivan	Mamakating	352.28	566.94	114	Wurtsboro, Highview	Westbound exit only; access via CR 171
Sullivan	Mamakating	354.33	570.24	115	Burlingham Road	Westbound exit and eastbound entrance
Orange	Wallkill	354.93	571.20	116	NY 17K east – Bloomingburg, Montgomery	Western terminus of NY 17K
Orange	Wallkill			117	Tarbell Road	Former westbound exit only
Orange	Wallkill			118	Fair Oaks	Access via CR 76/M and M Road
Orange	Wallkill			118A	NY 17M east – Rockville	Former eastbound exit and western entrance; former western terminus of NY 17M
Orange	Wallkill	359.20	578.08	119	NY 302 – Pine Bush	
Orange	Wallkill	361.93	582.47	120	NY 211 – Middletown, Montgomery	Signed as exits 120W (NY 211 west) and 120E (NY 211 east) eastbound; serves Middletown station
Orange	Wallkill	362.85	583.95	121	I-84 – Scranton, Newburgh	Signed as exits 121W (I-84 west) and 121E (I-84 east); exits 19A and 19B on I-84
Orange	Wallkill			122	CR 67 – Middletown, Crystal Run	
Orange	Town of Goshen			122A	Fletcher Street – Goshen	
Orange	Village of Goshen	366.93	590.52	123	US 6 west / NY 17M west – Middletown, Port Jervis	Western end of US 6/NY 17M concurrency; westbound exit and eastbound entrance
Orange	Village of Goshen	367.32	591.14	124	NY 17A east / NY 17M east / NY 207 east – Florida, Goshen	Eastern end of NY 17M concurrency; western termini of NY 17A and NY 207
Orange	Town of Goshen			125	Harriman Drive to South Street	
Orange	Village of Chester	371.39	597.69	126	NY 17M / NY 94 – Chester, Florida	NY 17M not signed
Orange	Town of Chester	373.22	600.64	127	To Greycourt Road – Sugar Loaf, Warwick	Westbound exit only; access via Lehigh Avenue
Orange	Blooming Grove			128	NY 17M / CR 51 north – Oxford Depot	Westbound exit only; NY 17M not signed; southern terminus of CR 51
Orange	Blooming Grove			129	Museum Village Road	No westbound entrance
Orange	Town of Monroe	376.72	606.27	130	NY 208 – Monroe, Washingtonville	
Orange	Woodbury	379.68	611.04	130A	US 6 east – Bear Mountain	Eastern end of US 6 concurrency; eastbound exit and westbound entrance
Orange	Woodbury	380.27	611.99	131	Future I-86 east / NY 32 north to I-87 Toll / New York Thruway – New York City, Albany, Newburgh, Suffern	Eastern end of Future I-86 concurrency; southern terminus of NY 32
Orange	Woodbury	380.27	611.99	Eastern end of freeway section		
Orange	Woodbury	380.46	612.29		US 6 east to Palisades Parkway – Bear Mountain, West Point	Interchange
Orange	Harriman	381.45	613.88		NY 17M west – Monroe	Eastern terminus of NY 17M
Orange	Tuxedo				Arden Valley Road east – Harriman State Park	Western terminus of Arden Valley Road
Orange	Tuxedo	387.32	623.33		NY 17A west – Sterling Forest, Greenwood Lake	Interchange; eastern terminus of NY 17A
Rockland	Sloatsburg				Seven Lakes Drive north – Harriman State Park, Bear Mountain	Southern terminus of Seven Lakes Drive
Rockland	Town of Ramapo				CR 72 west – Sterling Forest, Ringwood, West Milford	Interchange; eastern terminus of CR 72
Rockland	Town of Ramapo			Northern end of limited-access section		
Rockland	Hillburn	394.37– 394.83	634.68– 635.42	15A	I-87 Toll north / New York Thruway north / NY 59 east – Albany, Suffern	Northern end of I-87 / Thruway concurrency; western terminus of NY 59; exit number not signed southbound
Rockland	Hillburn	396.73	638.48	15	I-87 south / I-287 east / New York Thruway south – Governor Mario M. Cuomo Bridge, New York City	Southern end of I-87 / Thruway concurrency; northern end of I-287 concurrency; exit number not signed northbound
Rockland	Hillburn	396.84	638.65	–	I-287 south / Route 17 south – Morristown, Mahwah	Southern end of I-287 concurrency; continuation into New Jersey
1.000 mi = 1.609 km; 1.000 km = 0.621 mi: Closed/former; Concurrency terminus; Incomplete access; Tolled

== Suffixed routes ==
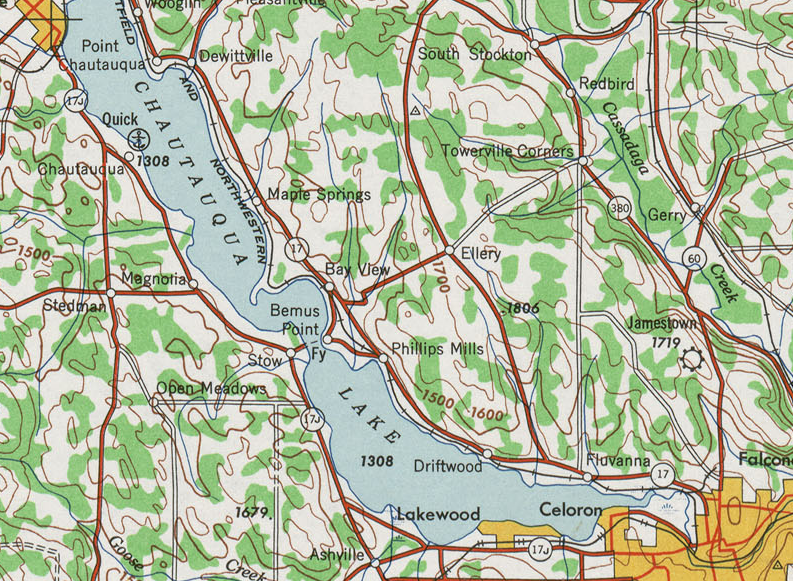
NY 17 and NY 17J marked on a 1948 topographical map

NY 17 has had 13 suffixed routes bearing 11 different designations. Five are still assigned to their routes, while eight have been removed or renumbered. A fourteenth, NY 17L, was proposed in 1939 as part of current NY 97, but canceled.

- The NY 17A designation has been used for two distinct highways:
  - The first NY 17A was an alternate route of NY 17 between Randolph and Salamanca via Little Valley. It was assigned in the mid-1920s and renumbered to NY 17H in the 1930 renumbering of state highways in New York.
  - The current NY 17A (24.76 miles or 39.85 kilometres) is an alternate route of NY 17 between Goshen and Southfields that connects NY 17 to Warwick in Orange County. It was assigned as part of the 1930 renumbering.
- NY 17B (21.90 miles or 35.24 kilometres) is a spur of NY 17 connecting Monticello to NY 97 in Callicoon. When it was originally assigned in 1930, it also extended northward to Hancock via modern NY 97.
- NY 17C (40.34 miles or 64.92 kilometres) is an alternate route of NY 17 between Waverly and Binghamton in Tioga and Broome counties. The western terminus of the route was initially located in Owego upon being assigned in 1930.
- NY 17D was a spur of NY 17 in the vicinity of Elmira, Chemung County that ran from downtown Elmira to the Pennsylvania border east of Wellsburg. The route, assigned in 1930, was renumbered to NY 427 in the early 1940s.
- NY 17E was an alternate route of NY 17 between Big Flats and Elmira in Chemung County. The route, assigned in 1930, was renumbered to NY 352 in October 1966 after local community pressure.
- NY 17F was an alternate route of NY 17 between Andover, Allegany County, and Addison, Steuben County. The route, assigned in 1930, was a northerly alternate route of NY 17 that served Hornell and Canisteo. NY 17F was removed in the early 1940s and is now NY 21, NY 36 and Steuben County's CR 119.
- NY 17G was a spur assigned in 1930 to what is now NY 248 south of NY 417. It became part of an extended NY 248 in the early 1940s.
- The NY 17H designation has been used for two distinct highways:
  - The first NY 17H was an alternate route of NY 17 between Randolph and Salamanca via Little Valley in Cattaraugus County. It was assigned in 1930 and removed c. 1937. The route became part of an extended NY 242 west of Little Valley and remained part of NY 18 (which NY 17H overlapped) east of the village (that portion of NY 18 became NY 353 in 1962).
  - The second NY 17H was a spur route of NY 17 in the vicinity of Binghamton. The route began at NY 17 in Binghamton and followed Riverside Drive west and north to Johnson City, where it ended at NY 17C. It was assigned by 1940 and partially replaced with NY 201 in September 1971.
- NY 17J was a westerly alternate route of NY 17 between Mayville and Jamestown along the western edge of Chautauqua Lake. It was assigned in 1930 and supplanted by NY 394 in November 1973.
- NY 17K (22.37 miles or 36.00 kilometres) is a spur linking NY 17 in Bloomingburg to US 9W and NY 32 in Newburgh, Orange County. It was assigned c. 1939.
- NY 17M (26.63 miles or 42.86 kilometres) is the former routing of NY 17 in Orange County. The route begins north of Middletown in Fair Oaks and rejoins NY 17 in Harriman. It was assigned in 1951.

== See also ==
- New York State Bicycle Route 17

Former alignments

- New York State Route 352
- New York State Route 394
- New York State Route 417
- New York State Route 430
- New York State Route 434
- New York State Route 951T
- The entire 170 series of county routes in Sullivan County except 174A

County route systems containing a former alignment

- List of county routes in Chemung County, New York
- List of county routes in Delaware County, New York
- List of county routes in Orange County, New York
- List of county routes in Tioga County, New York
