= Hancock (village), New York =

Hancock, New York
- Village
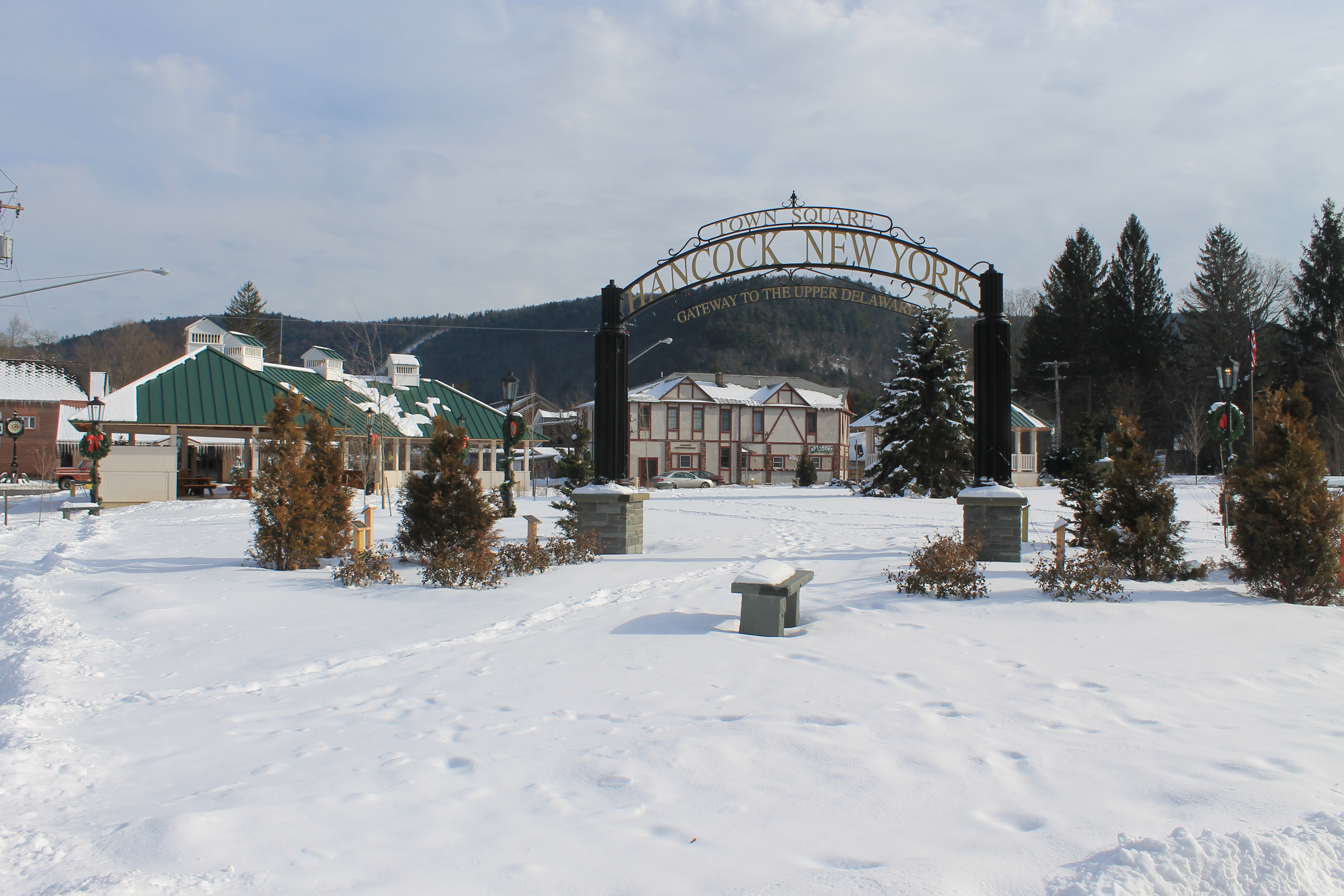
- Hancock Town Square
- Motto: Gateway to the Upper Delaware
- Location within the state of New York
- Coordinates: 41°57′17″N 75°17′0″W
- Country: United States
- State: New York
- County: Delaware
- Town: Hancock

Area
  - Total: 1.69 sq mi (4.39 km^{2})
  - Land: 1.57 sq mi (4.06 km^{2})
  - Water: 0.13 sq mi (0.34 km^{2})
- Elevation: 922 ft (281 m)

Population (2020)
  - Total: 908
  - Density: 579.7/sq mi (223.82/km^{2})
- Time zone: UTC-5 (Eastern (EST))
  - Summer (DST): UTC-4 (EDT)
- ZIP code: 13783
- Area code: 607
- FIPS code: 36-31940
- GNIS feature ID: 0952148
- Website: villageofhancockny.com

Hancock is a village in Delaware County, New York, United States. The population was 908 at the 2020 census. The village is in the west part of the town of Hancock at the junction of NY Routes 17 and 97.

Hancock is located at the confluence of the East and West branches of the Delaware River.

Hancock owes its former importance mainly to the Erie Railroad from 1848. The Erie merged into the Erie Lackawanna Railway in 1960. The railroad still exists as the Southern Tier Line of the Norfolk Southern Railway, leased to the Central New York Railroad, but sees only a few freight trains weekly.

The Scranton Branch of the New York, Ontario and Western Railway bridged the West Branch of the Delaware River just west of the village; this railway's main activity in the area was at Cadosia junction, a few miles up the East Branch of the Delaware River. Though the O&W ceased operations on March 29, 1957, the bridge was not removed until the 1970s.

== Geography ==
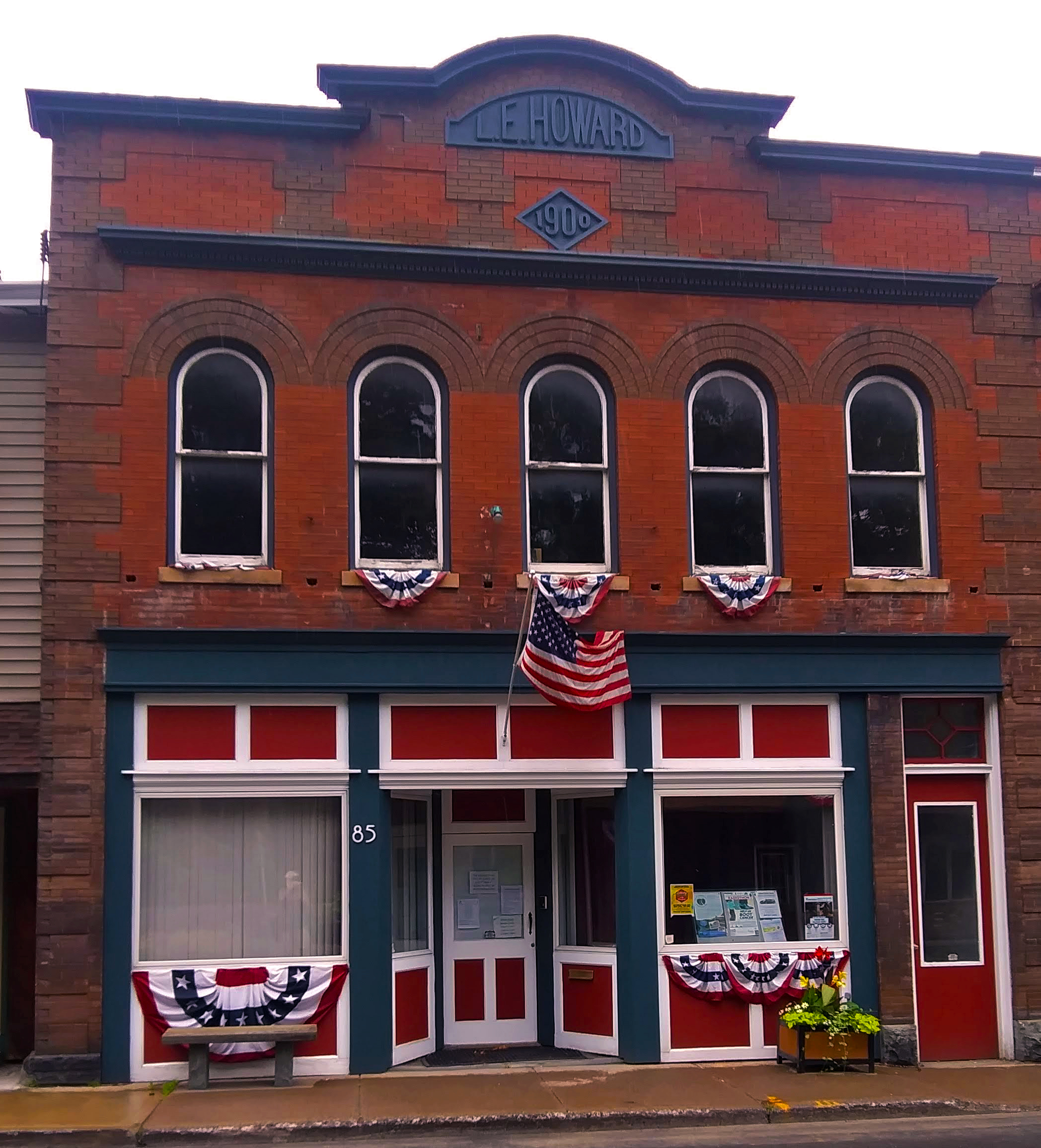
Village Hall

Hancock is situated at the convergence of the East and West Branch of the Delaware River and borders Pennsylvania. The village is located at 41°57′17″N 75°16′59″W (41.954764, -75.283326). Hancock is 43 miles (69 km) east of Binghamton with easy access via New York State Route 17. To many, Hancock is considered part of the Southern Tier region, while others regard it a part of the Catskills region. Nevertheless, since it is farther from New York City than Roscoe, it has always been considered to be in Upstate New York.

According to the United States Census Bureau, the village has a total area of 1.7 square miles (4.3 km^{2}), of which 1.5 square miles (3.9 km^{2}) is land and 0.2 square miles (0.4 km^{2}), or 8.57%, is water.

== Demographics ==
Historical population
Census	Pop.	Note	%±
1880	686		—
1890	1,279		86.4%
1900	1,283		0.3%
1910	1,329		3.6%
1920	1,326		−0.2%
1930	1,427		7.6%
1940	1,581		10.8%
1950	1,560		−1.3%
1960	1,830		17.3%
1970	1,688		−7.8%
1980	1,526		−9.6%
1990	1,330		−12.8%
2000	1,189		−10.6%
2010	1,031		−13.3%
2020	908		−11.9%
U.S. Decennial Census

As of the census of 2000, there were 1,189 people, 505 households, and 311 families residing in the village. The population density was 755.4 inhabitants per square mile (291.7/km^{2}). There were 594 housing units at an average density of 377.4 per square mile (145.7/km^{2}). The racial makeup of the village was 96.89% White, 0.42% Black or African American, 0.42% Native American, 0.17% Asian, 0.42% from other races, and 1.68% from two or more races. Hispanic or Latino of any race were 3.28% of the population.

There were 505 households, out of which 25.0% had children under the age of 18 living with them, 45.9% were married couples living together, 11.3% had a female householder with no husband present, and 38.4% were non-families. 34.5% of all households were made up of individuals, and 20.0% had someone living alone who was 65 years of age or older. The average household size was 2.35 and the average family size was 2.95.

In the village, the population was spread out, with 22.5% under the age of 18, 6.0% from 18 to 24, 22.9% from 25 to 44, 24.2% from 45 to 64, and 24.4% who were 65 years of age or older. The median age was 44 years. For every 100 females, there were 88.1 males. For every 100 females age 18 and over, there were 84.2 males.

The median income for a household in the village was $27,419, and the median income for a family was $36,083. Males had a median income of $27,455 versus $17,188 for females. The per capita income for the village was $16,616. About 7.9% of families and 15.6% of the population were below the poverty line, including 23.7% of those under age 18 and 15.7% of those age 65 or over.
