= List of places in New York: H =

This list of current cities, towns, unincorporated communities, counties, and other recognized places in the U.S. state of New York also includes information on the number and names of counties in which the place lies, and its lower and upper zip code bounds, if applicable.

List of places in New York: A | B | C | D | E | F | G | H | I | J | K | L | M | N | O | P | Q | R | S | T | U | V | W | X | Y | Z

Name of place	Counties	Principal county	Lower zip code	Upper zip code
Haberman	1	Queens County		
Hadley	1	Saratoga County	12835	
Hadley	1	Saratoga County	12835	
Hadley Bay	1	Chautauqua County	14785	
Hagaman	1	Montgomery County	12086	
Hagedorns Mills	1	Saratoga County	12074	
Hagerman	1	Suffolk County	11772	
Hague	1	Warren County	12836	
Hailesboro	1	St. Lawrence County	13645	
Haines Corners	1	Putnam County		
Haines Falls	1	Greene County	12436	
Halcott	1	Greene County		
Halcott Center	1	Greene County	12430	
Halcottsville	1	Delaware County	12438	
Halcottville	1	Delaware County		
Hale Eddy	1	Delaware County		
Hale Mills	1	Fulton County		
Hales Eddy	1	Delaware County	13783	
Halesite	1	Suffolk County	11743	
Half Acre	1	Cayuga County	13021	
Half Hollow	1	Suffolk County	11729	
Half Hollow Hills	1	Suffolk County	11746	
Halfmoon	1	Saratoga County	12188	
Halfmoon	1	Saratoga County		
Halfmoon Beach	1	Saratoga County		
Halfmoon Junction	1	Saratoga County	12188	
Halfway	1	Onondaga County	13060	
Halfway House Corners	1	St. Lawrence County	13660	
Halihan Hill	1	Ulster County		
Hall	1	Ontario County	14463	
Hall	1	Queens County		
Halls Corner	1	Wyoming County	14569	
Halls Corners	1	Seneca County	14847	
Hallsport	1	Allegany County	14895	
Hallsville	1	Montgomery County	13339	
Halsey	1	Kings County	11233	
Halseys Corners	1	Clinton County	12901	
Halsey Valley	1	Tioga County	14883	
Halseyville	1	Tompkins County		
Hambletville	1	Delaware County	13754	
Hamburg (village)	1	Erie County	14075	
Hamburg (town)	1	Erie County		
Hamburg (hamlet)	1	Greene County	12414	
Hamburg-on-the-Lake	1	Erie County	14075	
Hamden	1	Delaware County	13782	
Hamden	1	Delaware County		
Hamilton (village)	1	Madison County	13346	
Hamilton (town)	1	Madison County		
Hamilton Beach	1	Queens County	11414	
Hamilton Center	1	Madison County	13346	
Hamilton Grange	1	New York County	10031	
Hamilton Grange National Memorial	1	New York County	10031	
Hamilton Park	1	Richmond County	10301	
Hamlet	1	Chautauqua County	14138	
Hamlin	1	Monroe County	14464	
Hamlin	1	Monroe County		
Hammel	1	Queens County		
Hammertown	1	Dutchess County	12567	
Hammond	1	St. Lawrence County	13646	
Hammond	1	St. Lawrence County		
Hammonds Corner	1	Oswego County		
Hammondsport	1	Steuben County	14840	
Hampshire	1	Steuben County	14855	
Hampton	1	Washington County	12837	
Hampton	1	Washington County		
Hampton Bays	1	Suffolk County	11946	
Hampton Beach	1	Suffolk County		
Hamptonburgh	1	Orange County		
Hamptonburgh	1	Orange County		
Hampton Manor	1	Rensselaer County	12144	
Hampton Park	1	Rensselaer County		
Hampton Park	1	Suffolk County	11968	
Hancock (town)	1	Delaware County	13783	
Hancock (village)	1	Delaware County		
Hancock Field	1	Onondaga County	13225	
Handsome Eddy	1	Sullivan County		
Hanford Bay	1	Chautauqua County	14136	
Hankins	1	Sullivan County	12741	
Hanna	1	Tioga County		
Hannacroix	1	Greene County	12087	
Hannawa Falls	1	St. Lawrence County	13647	
Hannibal	1	Oswego County	13074	
Hannibal	1	Oswego County		
Hannibal Center	1	Oswego County	13074	
Hanover	1	Chautauqua County		
Hanover	1	Oneida County		
Hanover Center	1	Chautauqua County		
Happy Valley	1	Oswego County		
Happy Valley	1	Rockland County		
Harbor	1	Herkimer County		
Harbor Acres	1	Nassau County	11050	
Harbor Green	1	Nassau County	11758	
Harbor Heights Park	1	Suffolk County	11743	
Harbor Hills	1	Nassau County	11023	
Harbor Isle	1	Nassau County	11558	
Hardenburgh	1	Ulster County		
Harding Crossing	1	Schenectady County		
Hard Point	1	Cayuga County		
Hardscrabble	1	Delaware County		
Hardscrabble	1	Suffolk County	11937	
Hardy Corners	1	Allegany County		
Hardys	1	Wyoming County	14066	
Harford	1	Cortland County	13784	
Harford	1	Cortland County		
Harford Mills	1	Cortland County	13835	
Harkness	1	Clinton County	12972	
Harlem	1	Erie County	14226	
Harlem	1	New York County		
Harlem River	1	Bronx County		
Harlemville	1	Columbia County		
Harmon-on-Hudson	1	Westchester County	10520	
Harmon Park	1	Schenectady County	12302	
Harmony	1	Chautauqua County		
Harmony Corners	1	Saratoga County	12020	
Harpersfield	1	Delaware County	13786	
Harpersfield	1	Delaware County		
Harpursville	1	Broome County	13787	
Harriet	1	Erie County	14223	
Harrietstown	1	Franklin County	12983	
Harrietstown	1	Franklin County		
Harrigan	1	Clinton County		
Harriman	1	Orange County	10926	
Harriman South	1	Orange County		
Harris	1	Sullivan County	12742	
Harrisburg	1	Cattaraugus County	14753	
Harrisburg	1	Lewis County		
Harrisburg	1	Warren County	12878	
Harris Corners	1	Wyoming County	14145	
Harris Hill	1	Erie County	14221	
Harris Hill Manor	1	Chemung County		
Harrison	1	Westchester County	10528	
Harrison	1	Westchester County		
Harrison Grove	1	Niagara County		
Harrisville	1	Chenango County		
Harrisville	1	Lewis County	13648	
Harrower	1	Montgomery County		
Hartfield	1	Chautauqua County	14728	
Hartford	1	Washington County	12838	
Hartford	1	Washington County		
Hart Island	1	Bronx County		
Hartland	1	Niagara County	14067	
Hartland	1	Niagara County		
Hart Lot	1	Onondaga County	13060	
Hartman	1	Warren County		
Hartmans Corners	1	Albany County	12009	
Hartsdale	1	Westchester County	10530	
Harts Hill	1	Oneida County	13492	
Hartson Point	1	Livingston County	14487	
Hartsville	1	Steuben County	14843	
Hartsville	1	Steuben County		
Hartwick	1	Otsego County	13348	
Hartwick	1	Otsego County		
Hartwood	1	Sullivan County	12729	
Hartwood Club	1	Sullivan County		
Harvard	1	Delaware County	13756	
Hasbrouck	1	Sullivan County	12788	
Hasbroucks	1	Hamilton County		
Haselton	1	Essex County		
Haselton	1	Oneida County	13440	
Haskell Flats	1	Cattaraugus County	14727	
Haskinville	1	Steuben County	14826	
Hastings	1	Oswego County	13076	
Hastings	1	Oswego County		
Hastings Center	1	Oswego County	13036	
Hastings-on-Hudson	1	Westchester County	10706	
Hatch's Corner	1	St. Lawrence County	13684	
Hatchs Corners	1	Oneida County		
Hathaway Corners	1	Ontario County		
Hauppauge	1	Suffolk County	11788	
Haven	1	Sullivan County	12790	
Haverling Heights	1	Steuben County		
Haverstraw (town)	1	Rockland County	10927	
Haverstraw (village)	1	Rockland County		
Haviland	1	Dutchess County	12538	
Haviland Hollow	1	Putnam County	12563	
Hawkeye	1	Clinton County	12912	
Hawkins Corner	1	Chautauqua County		
Hawkins Corner	1	Oneida County		
Hawkinsville	1	Oneida County	13309	
Hawley Corners	1	Chenango County		
Hawleys	1	Delaware County	13856	
Hawleyton	1	Broome County	13903	
Hawthorne	1	Westchester County	10532	
Hawthorne Hill	1	Schenectady County	12309	
Hawthorne Park	1	Chautauqua County	14787	
Hawversville	1	Schoharie County	12122	
Haydenville	1	Cattaraugus County	14760	
Hayground	1	Suffolk County	11976	
Haynersville	1	Rensselaer County		
Haynes	1	Chenango County		
Hayt Corners	1	Seneca County	14521	
Hayts Corners	1	Seneca County		
Hazel	1	Sullivan County	12758	
Head Corners	1	Tompkins County		
Head of the Harbor	1	Suffolk County	11780	
Heathcote	1	Westchester County	10583	
Heathcote	1	Westchester County	10583	
Heatherwood North	1	Suffolk County	11733	
Heatherwood South	1	Suffolk County	11720	
Heath Grove	1	Onondaga County	13110	
Heath Ridge	1	Westchester County	10583	
Hebron	1	Washington County		
Hecla	1	Oneida County	13490	
Hector	1	Schuyler County	14841	
Hector	1	Schuyler County		
Hedgesville	1	Steuben County	14801	
Helena	1	St. Lawrence County	13649	
Hell Gate	1	New York County	10029	
Helmuth	1	Erie County	14079	
Hemlock	1	Livingston County	14466	
Hempstead	1	Nassau County	11550	54
Hempstead	1	Nassau County		
New Hempstead	1	Rockland County		
Hempstead Gardens	1	Nassau County	11552	
Hemstreet Park	1	Rensselaer County	12118	
Henderson	1	Jefferson County	13650	
Henderson	1	Jefferson County		
Henderson Harbor	1	Jefferson County	13651	
Hendy Creek	1	Chemung County	14871	
Henrietta	1	Monroe County	14467	
Henrietta	1	Monroe County		
Hensonville	1	Greene County	12439	
Heritage	1	Schenectady County	12303	
Heritage Hills	1	Westchester County		
Herkimer	1	Herkimer County	13350	
Herkimer	1	Herkimer County		
Hermitage	1	Steuben County	14810	
Hermitage	1	Wyoming County	14066	
Hermon (town)	1	St. Lawrence County	13652	
Hermon (village)	1	St. Lawrence County		
Herrick Grove	1	Jefferson County	13622	
Herricks	1	Nassau County	11040	
Herricks	1	Nassau County	11040	
Herrings	1	Jefferson County	13653	
Hertel	1	Erie County	14216	
Herthum Heights	1	Oneida County	13492	
Hervey Street	1	Greene County		
Hessville	1	Montgomery County	13339	
Heuvelton	1	St. Lawrence County	13654	
Hewittville	1	St. Lawrence County	13668	
Hewlett	1	Nassau County	11557	
Hewlett Bay Park	1	Nassau County	11557	
Hewlett Harbor	1	Nassau County	11557	
Hewlett Neck	1	Nassau County	11598	
Hibbards Corner	1	Tompkins County		
Hibernia	1	Dutchess County		
Hickeys Corners	1	Saratoga County	12866	
Hickorybush	1	Ulster County	12401	
Hickory Corners	1	Niagara County		
Hickory Grove	1	Oswego County	13126	
Hicks	1	Chemung County	14859	
Hicksville	1	Nassau County	11801	55
Higgins	1	Allegany County	14065	
Higgins Bay	1	Hamilton County	12108	
Higginsville	1	Oneida County	13054	
High Bank	1	Clinton County	12981	
High Bridge	1	Bronx County	10452	
High Bridge	1	Onondaga County	13066	
High Falls	1	Greene County		
High Falls	1	Lewis County		
High Falls	1	Ulster County	12440	
High Flats	1	St. Lawrence County	13625	
Highland	1	Sullivan County		
Highland	1	Ulster County	12528	
Highland Beach	1	Cayuga County		
Highland Falls	1	Orange County	10928	
Highland Lake	1	Sullivan County	12743	
Highland Landing	1	Ulster County		
Highland Mills	1	Orange County	10930	
Highland-on-the-Lake	1	Erie County	14047	
Highland Park	1	Niagara County	14094	
Highlands	1	Orange County		
Highlawn	1	Kings County	11223	
High Market	1	Lewis County		
High Mills	1	Schenectady County	12027	
Highmount	1	Ulster County	12441	
High View	1	Sullivan County	12721	
Highview	1	Sullivan County		
High Woods	1	Ulster County	12477	
Hiler	1	Erie County	14223	
Hill	1	Orange County	10940	
Hillburn	1	Rockland County	10931	
Hill Corners	1	Fulton County		
Hillcrest	1	Allegany County	14717	
Hillcrest	1	Broome County	13901	
Hillcrest	1	Rockland County	10977	
Hillis	1	Dutchess County		
Hillis Terrace	1	Dutchess County	12603	
Hillsboro	1	Oneida County	13316	
Hillsdale	1	Columbia County	12529	
Hillsdale	1	Columbia County		
Hillsdale	1	Washington County		
Hillside	1	Bronx County	10469	
Hillside	1	Oneida County		
Hillside	1	Queens County		
Hillside	1	Ulster County		
Hillside Heights	1	Nassau County	11040	
Hillside Lake	1	Dutchess County	12590	
Hillside Manor	1	Nassau County	11040	
Hillside Park	1	Fulton County	12095	
Hillview	1	Rensselaer County	12144	
Hilton	1	Monroe County	14468	
Hiltonville	1	Allegany County		
Himrod	1	Yates County	14842	
Himrods Junction	1	Yates County		
Hinckley	1	Oneida County	13352	
Hindsburg	1	Orleans County	14411	
Hinkleyville	1	Monroe County	14559	
Hinmans Corners	1	Broome County	13905	
Hinmansville	1	Oswego County	13135	
Hinsburg	1	Orleans County		
Hinsdale	1	Cattaraugus County	14743	
Hinsdale	1	Cattaraugus County		
Hinsdale	1	Onondaga County	13211	
Hitching Corner	1	Herkimer County		
Hoag Corners	1	Rensselaer County	12062	
Hobart	1	Delaware County	13788	
Hoben	1	Allegany County		
Hobin Corners	1	Oneida County		
Hoboken	1	Otsego County	13411	
Hoeseville	1	Fulton County		
Hoffman	1	Niagara County		
Hoffmans	1	Schenectady County	12088	
Hoffmeister	1	Hamilton County	13353	
Hogansburg	1	Franklin County	13655	
Hogtown	1	Washington County	12827	
Holbrook	1	Suffolk County	11741	
Holbrook Corners	1	Saratoga County		
Holbrook-Holtsville	1	Suffolk County	11741	
Holcomb	1	Ontario County	14469	
Holcombville	1	Warren County	12853	
Holiday Manor	1	Ontario County	14456	
Holland	1	Erie County	14080	
Holland	1	Erie County		
Holland	1	Queens County		
Holland Cove	1	Wayne County	14589	
Holland Patent	1	Oneida County	13354	
Holley	1	Orleans County	14470	
Hollis	1	Queens County	11423	
Hollis Court	1	Queens County	11429	
Holliswood	1	Queens County	11352	
Hollowville	1	Columbia County	12530	
Hollywood	1	St. Lawrence County	12922	
Holmes	1	Dutchess County	12531	
Holmesville	1	Chenango County	13843	
Holton Beach	1	Seneca County	14847	
Holtsville	1	Suffolk County	11742	
Homecrest	1	Kings County	11229	
Home of Franklin D Roosevelt National Historic Site	1	Dutchess County	12538	
Homer (town)	1	Cortland County	13077	
Homer (village)	1	Cortland County		
Homer Hill	1	Cattaraugus County	14760	
Homestead Park	1	Westchester County		
Homewood	1	Onondaga County	13066	
Homewood Park	1	Erie County	14225	
Honeoye	1	Ontario County	14471	
Honeoye Falls	1	Monroe County	14472	
Honeoye Park	1	Ontario County		
Honest Hill	1	Orleans County	14470	
Honeyville	1	Jefferson County		
Honeywell Corners	1	Fulton County	12025	
Honk Hill	1	Ulster County	12458	
Honnedaga	1	Oneida County		
Honnedaga Lake	1	Oneida County	13338	
Hooker	1	Lewis County		
Hooper	1	Broome County		
Hoopers Valley	1	Tioga County	13812	
Hoosick	1	Rensselaer County	12089	
Hoosick	1	Rensselaer County		
Hoosick Falls	1	Rensselaer County	12090	
Hoosick Junction	1	Rensselaer County	12133	
Hope	1	Hamilton County		
Hope Falls	1	Hamilton County	12134	
Hope Farm	1	Dutchess County	12532	
Hope Valley	1	Hamilton County	12134	
Hopewell	1	Dutchess County		
Hopewell	1	Ontario County		
Hopewell Center	1	Ontario County	14424	
Hopewell Junction	1	Dutchess County	12533	
Hopkins Beach	1	Niagara County		
Hopkinton	1	St. Lawrence County	12940	
Hopkinton	1	St. Lawrence County		
Horace Harding	1	Queens County	11362	
Horicon	1	Warren County		
Hornby	1	Steuben County	14812	
Hornby	1	Steuben County		
Hornell	1	Steuben County	14843	
Hornellsville	1	Steuben County		
Horseheads (town)	1	Chemung County	14845	
Horseheads (village)	1	Chemung County		
Horseheads North	1	Chemung County		
Horseshoe	1	St. Lawrence County		
Horseshoe Hill	1	Westchester County		
Horton	1	Delaware County	12776	
Horton Estates	1	Westchester County	10587	
Hortontown	1	Onondaga County		
Hortontown	1	Putnam County		
Hortonville	1	Sullivan County	12745	
Hoseaville	1	Delaware County		
Hoseville	1	Lewis County		
Hospital Station	1	Dutchess County		
Houcks Corners	1	Albany County		
Houghton	1	Allegany County	14744	
Hounsfield	1	Jefferson County		
Houseville	1	Lewis County	13473	
Housons Corners	1	Schoharie County	12122	
Howard	1	New York County	10013	
Howard	1	Steuben County	14809	
Howard	1	Steuben County		
Howard Beach	1	Queens County	11414	
Howardville	1	Oswego County	13302	
Howells	1	Orange County	10932	
Howells Junction	1	Orange County		
Howes	1	Broome County		
Howes	1	Wyoming County		
Howes Cave	1	Schoharie County	12092	
Howland	1	Cayuga County		
Howland Corners	1	Tompkins County		
Howland Hook	1	Richmond County		
Howlett Hill	1	Onondaga County	13031	
Hoyts	1	Cattaraugus County		
Hub	1	Bronx County	10455	
Hubbardsville	1	Madison County	13355	
Hubbardtown	1	Tioga County	13743	
Hubbell Corners	1	Delaware County	12474	
Huddle	1	Wayne County		
Hudson	1	Columbia County	12534	
Hudson Falls	1	Washington County	12839	
Hudson Terrace	1	Westchester County		
Hudson Upper	1	Columbia County	12534	
Hughsonville	1	Dutchess County	12537	
Huguenot	1	Orange County	12746	
Huguenot	1	Richmond County	10301	
Huguenot Park	1	Westchester County		
Hulberton	1	Orleans County	14470	
Huletts Landing	1	Washington County	12841	
Hullsville	1	Tioga County	13827	
Humaston	1	Oneida County	13308	
Hume	1	Allegany County	14745	
Hume	1	Allegany County		
Humphrey	1	Cattaraugus County	14741	
Humphrey	1	Cattaraugus County		
Humphrey Center	1	Cattaraugus County	14741	
Hungerford Corners	1	Jefferson County		
Hungry Hill	1	Schenectady County		
Hunt	1	Livingston County	14846	
Hunter (town)	1	Greene County	12442	
Hunter (village)	1	Greene County		
Hunter Lake	1	Sullivan County	12768	
Huntersland	1	Schoharie County	12122	
Hunterspoint Avenue	1	Queens County		
Hunt Hollow	1	Livingston County		
Hunt Hollow	1	Ontario County	14512	
Huntington	1	Suffolk County	11743	
Huntington	1	Suffolk County		
Huntington	1	Suffolk County		
Huntington Bay	1	Suffolk County	11743	
Huntington Beach	1	Suffolk County	11721	
Huntington Station	1	Suffolk County	11746	
Huntingtonville	1	Jefferson County	13601	
Huntly Corners	1	Otsego County		
Hunts Corners	1	Cortland County	13803	
Hunts Corners	1	Erie County	14031	
Hunts Corners	1	Sullivan County	12764	
Hunts Point	1	Bronx County		
Hurd	1	Sullivan County		
Hurd Corners	1	Dutchess County	12564	
Hurd Settlement	1	Sullivan County		
Hurlbutville	1	Oneida County		
Hurley (CDP)	1	Ulster County	12443	
Hurley (town)	1	Ulster County		
Hurleyville	1	Sullivan County	12747	
Huron	1	Wayne County		
Huron	1	Wayne County		
Hurricane	1	Herkimer County		
Hurtsville	1	Albany County		
Hutchinson Crossing	1	Schenectady County		
Hyde Park	1	Dutchess County	12538	
Hyde Park	1	Otsego County	13326	
Hydesville	1	Wayne County		
Hydeville	1	Broome County		
Hydeville	1	Chenango County		
Hyndsville	1	Schoharie County	12043	
