= Clark Reservation State Park =

Protected area in New York, US

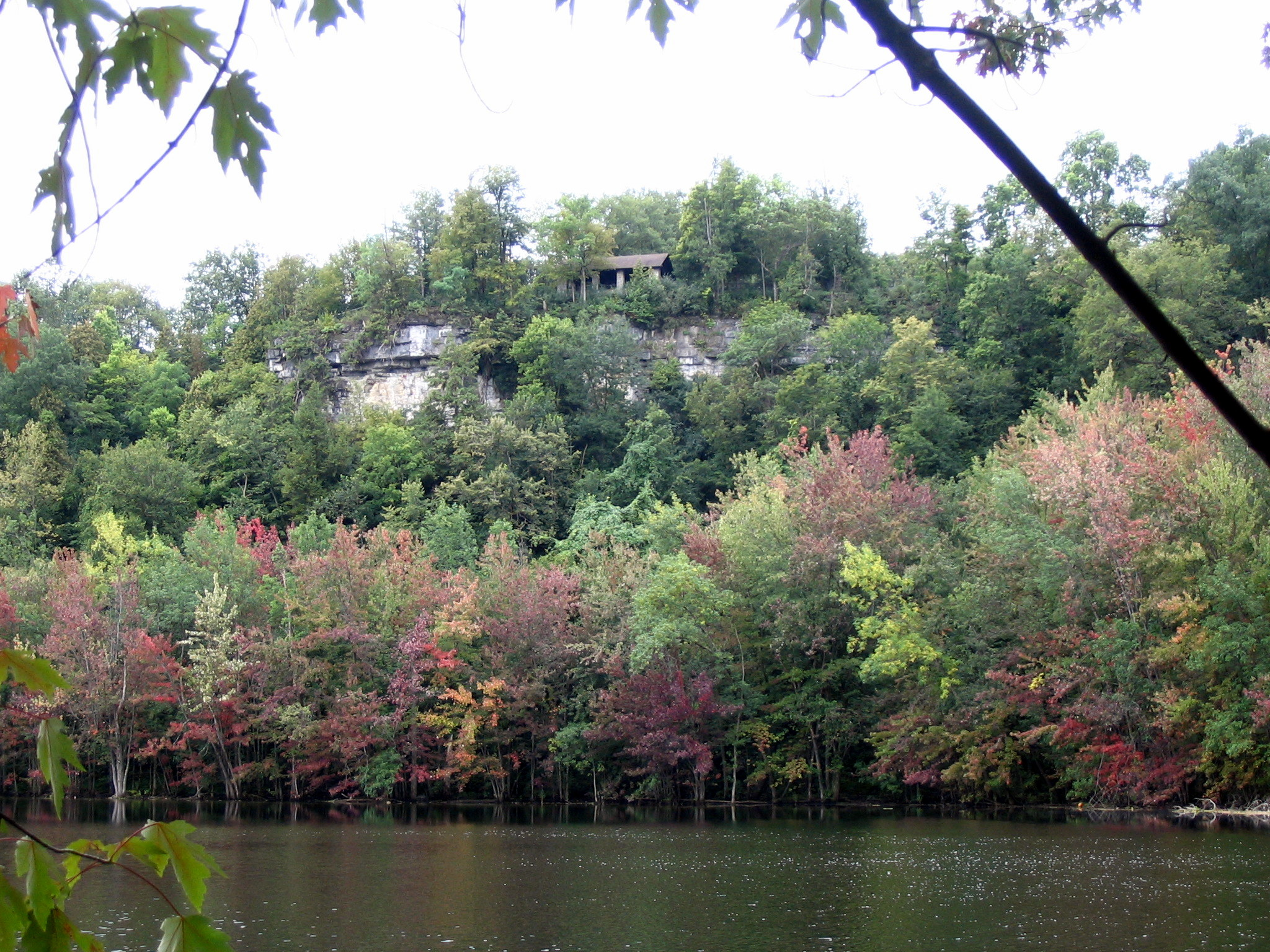
- Glacier Lake and the cliff of the fossil waterfall in September
- Interactive map of Clark Reservation State Park
- Location: Onondaga County, New York, USA
- Nearest city: Syracuse, New York
- Coordinates: 42°59′49″N 76°05′35″W
- Created: 1928
- Visitors: 147,738 (in 2025)
- Website: https://parks.ny.gov/parks/126/details.aspx

Clark Reservation State Park is a state park in Onondaga County, New York. The park is in Jamesville, NY, in the Town of DeWitt, south of Syracuse. It was the site of a large waterfall formed by melting glacial ice at the end of the last Ice Age; the plunge basin at the base of the old falls is now a small lake. James Macfarlane described the area in 1879, "On approaching the lake from the turnpike on the south side, the tourist is startled at finding himself, without any notice, on the brink of a yawning gulf, precisely like that of the Niagara River below the Falls, and nearly as deep." Clark Reservation is also noted for its many ferns; it harbors the largest population in the U.S. of American hart's tongue, which is so rare that it was declared endangered in the U.S. in 1989.

The park is 377 acres (153 ha) in size, and logs over 160,000 visitors per year. It encompasses the cliff, plunge basin and gorge of the ancient waterfall, and a number of secondary ravines and basins. Glacier Lake, which occupies the plunge basin of the former waterfall, is 6.2 acres (2.5 ha) in size and 52 feet (16 m) deep; it is a rare meromictic lake in which the deep waters don't mix annually with the surface waters. The surrounding limestone cliffs are 180 feet (55 m) high. Hiking trails skirt a half-ring of cliffs surrounding the lake, as well as traversing the rugged limestone over which the old river flowed.

A Nature Center is operated by the Friends of Clark Reservation, a nonprofit organization staffed completely by volunteers. The Center has exhibits about the park's geology and natural history, and is open from Memorial Day to Labor Day. In addition to staffing the Center, the Friends group also organizes events and retains a naturalist each summer to guide hikes and create nature programming for the public in the park. The park also offers fishing, hiking trails, picnic tables and pavilions, and a playground.

== History ==
Before the arrival of the Europeans, the land around the park belonged to Onondaga people. In the late 18th century, these lands were divided into military tracts to be awarded to soldiers returning from the Revolutionary War. Joshua Clark noted the lake and its precipitous cliffs in his 1840 book about Onondaga County. In 1879, James Macfarlane purchased the area around the fossil waterfall and the lake, and opened a small resort hotel in the park. Macfarlane (1819–1885) was a noted attorney, coal geologist, geological guidebook writer, and enthusiast of the area near what was then called Green Lake (later renamed Glacier Lake to avoid confusion with the nearby Green Lake in Fayetteville, NY). The resort's offerings included picnicking, boating, fishing, croquet and archery, but it closed after a few years.

The central part of the current park, amounting to 75 acres (30 ha) and including Glacier Lake and the fossil waterfall, was bought by Mary Clark Thompson in 1915. Thompson had learned that the fossil waterfall was being considered for a limestone quarry; just to the east were the enormous limestone quarries of the Solvay Process Company. Thompson gave this tract to the New York State Museum, with the stipulation that the land be preserved as a memorial to her father Myron H. Clark, who had been governor of New York State from 1855-56. Clark Reservation became a state park in 1926.

The New York State executive budget plan for 2010-2011 called for Clark Reservation State Park to be closed as a budget-cutting measure. The park closings were reversed for the 2010 season by legislation passed on May 28, 2010.

== Ferns ==
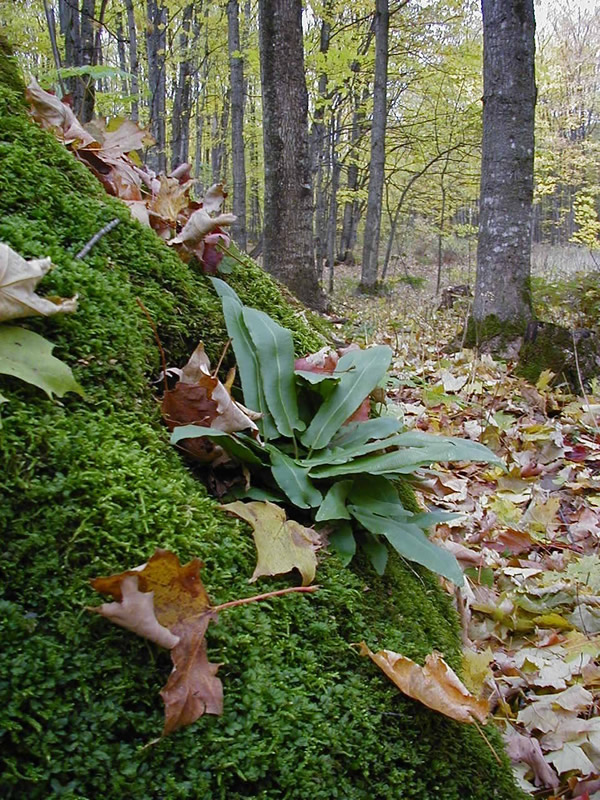
Specimen of American hart's tongue fern in Michigan; Clark Reservation has largest population of these endangered ferns in the U.S..

Clark Reservation is known for the diversity of fern species which grow there; in a 1994 survey, 26 fern species were identified. The park is presently the principal site in the United States preserving American hart's tongue fern. This fern is quite rare in North America; its presence on the continent was first discovered in 1807 by botanist Frederick Pursh at nearby Split Rock in Onondaga County. The second half of the 19th Century was a period of popular enthusiasm for ferns that has been called "pteridomania". Discovery of additional "stations" for hart's tongue, and indeed rediscovery of the original Split Rock station, were subjects of considerable interest in the 19th century. The station near Glacier Lake was first reported in 1866 by J. A. Paine, and several stations are now known within Clark Reservation. Because of its rarity, censuses of the fern in this region of New York have been reported periodically since 1916. In 1989, this species was declared as endangered in the United States.

A nearby site of hart's-tongue fern was White Lake and Green Pond, although Green Pond was destroyed in 1926. Before this occurred, populations of the fern were transplanted to Clark Reservation. One author has claimed that the conversion of Clark Reservation into a state park in 1926 occurred because of interest in preserving the American hart's tongue fern. In 1930, a state law was passed protecting hart's tongue fern in Onondaga County and also neighboring Madison County; nonetheless, destruction of habitat in the nearby Rock-cut gorge had destroyed still another station of these ferns by 1945.

== Geology ==
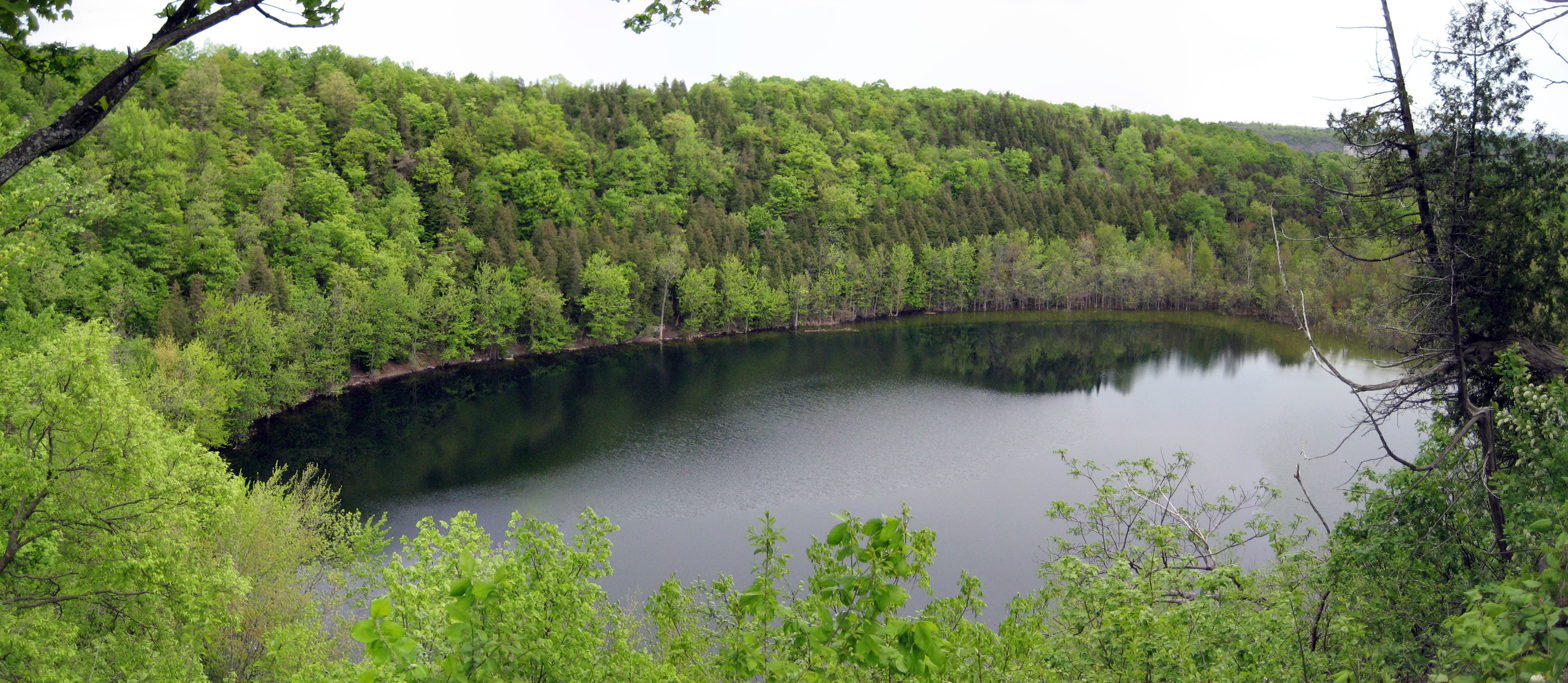
Looking northeast across Glacier Lake in May. The photograph is taken from the top of the southern cliffs 180 feet (55 m) above the lake. About 10,000 years ago, a large river of glacial meltwater flowed from the west (the left of the photograph) across these cliffs. The resulting waterfall created a plunge basin or gorge with its outlet to the east (the right of the photograph). Glacier Lake occupies the deepest part of this gorge.

The fossil waterfall and many of the topographical features of Clark Reservation were created about 10,000 years ago, near the end of the most recent ice age (the Wisconsin glaciation). A few miles west of Clark Reservation, glacial Lake Cardiff occupied the deep, Onondaga trough. Just east of Clark Reservation lay a similar glacial lake occupying the Butternut trough. Both troughs run north-south, aligned with the advance and retreat of the ice sheets that have scoured New York.

The retreating ice sheet blocked the northern ends of both glacial lakes, so as Cecil Roseberry describes, "The southern environs are furrowed with rock channels slashed by torrents of glacial meltwater seeking an escape route which they finally found to the Mohawk Valley." These rock channels are now called "the Syracuse channels". Because the elevation of the land in this region generally decreases from south to north, a series of channels was created by the northerly retreat of the ice sheet; each succeeding channel is lower, and more northerly, than the previous one. Smoky Hollow, which is a gorge lying about a mile south of Clark Reservation, was an early channel created by flows of water from Lake Cardiff into the Butternut trough when the ice sheet still covered the present Clark Reservation. The threshold for water to flow through this channel is at 790 feet (240 m) above sea level. As the ice sheet retreated, the waters found a new, lower channel running through Clark Reservation, with a channel threshold of about 720 feet (220 m). A waterfall formed, and its plunge pool ultimately became Glacier Lake. As the ice retreated further northward, a still lower channel (Rock-cut channel) was carved where Interstate 481 is currently located (channel threshold of about 550 feet (170 m)). The channels at Pumpkin Hollow, Meadowbrook, and at Green Lakes State Park have the same origins. Roseberry writes, "The abandoned gorges indicate a complex series of glacial rivers parallel to the receding ice front, producing waterfalls when they dropped over north-south ridges."

The 180 feet (55 m) relief of the fossil waterfall at Clark Reservation is somewhat larger than that of Niagara Falls (174 feet (53 m)). As at Niagara Falls, the well defined falls occurred because of the presence of a capstone layer of limestone that was resistant to erosion by the flowing river.

Roseberry writes that this "limestone is deeply waterworn and fissured, mutely telling the force of the deluge which hurled itself over the brink." The limestone shelf leading to the precipice at Clark Reservation is an example of a "karst" topography created by water's dissolution of limestone and related rocks. Among its features is a deep depression in the limestone that is known as Dry Lake. Dry Lake is about 12 metres (39 ft) deep and occupies 2 hectares (4.9 acres), and offers an unusual habitat for plants. As Franco, et al. report, "It is believed to be a karst feature created by dissolving limestone that formed a sinkhole basin. The bedrock is 300–400 million years old (Van Diver 1985) and its fissures allowed for rapid post-glacial water drainage."

== See also ==
- List of New York state parks
