= White Lake (Onondaga County, New York) =

White Lake Natural Area
- Interactive map of White Lake Natural Area
- Nearest city: DeWitt, New York
- Area: 459 acres (186 ha)
- Established: 2025

White Lake is a natural area near Jamesville, New York. The area, which includes a pond, wetlands, and forest, was owned for nearly a century beginning in the early 1900s by a succession of companies that operated a nearby quarry. When Allied Chemical sold the land in 1986, they included a legal covenant which stipulated that the land would remain undeveloped. During this time, local inhabitants used the land as an informal recreation site, for hiking, biking, and swimming. In 1997, the land was sold to a private individual, who quickly became involved in a legal battle over whether the land could be developed or not. Ultimately, courts decided that the land would remain natural. In 2025, a 459-acre (186 ha) parcel of the land was sold and donated to a preservation trust.

The White Lake natural area has been recognized for species that it hosts as early as the 1800s, when populations of Hart's-tongue fern were identified there. In 1997, there were reportedly 60 species of "state-protected" plant on the land, and the area was purchased in 2025 as part of an effort to preserve habitat for endangered species of bat, the Indiana bat and Northern long-eared bat.

== Geography ==
White Lake is located near Jamesville, in the town of DeWitt, and borders an active quarry. Clark Reservation State Park is located to the east, and the town of Manlius to the west. The lake has approximately 10 acres (4.0 ha) of surface area. Water from White Lake flows into Snook's pond and then into Limestone Creek. An additional 94.25 acres (38.14 ha) of land to the east of the pond are preserved by the Central New York Land Trust, which also maintains its headquarters there.

=== Green Pond ===
White Lake was previously fed by water from Green Pond, until mining destroyed it in 1924. In 1908, William Martin Beauchamp described the pond as being bordered in three directions by cliffs roughly 200 feet (61 m) high.

Green Pond was known by various names, including Green Lake, East Green Lake, and Scolopendrium Pond. The botanist R. C. Benedict wrote in 1915, "the lake itself is of equal geological interest and, from the standpoint of the hart's tongue fern, is of greater interest than the west lake region because the best specimens in the country grow near the east lake."

== Ecology ==
The land contains a marl fen and around 300 acres (120 ha) of forest, including ash, maple, and hickory trees. In 1997, The Post Standard reported that botanists had identified over 60 species of "state-protected" plant on the land. The land is also a habitat for the endangered Indiana bat and Northern long-eared bat, including hosting a hibernaculum, or bat cave, where the bats live in the winter. This cave is one of eight known of its kind in upstate New York.

== History ==
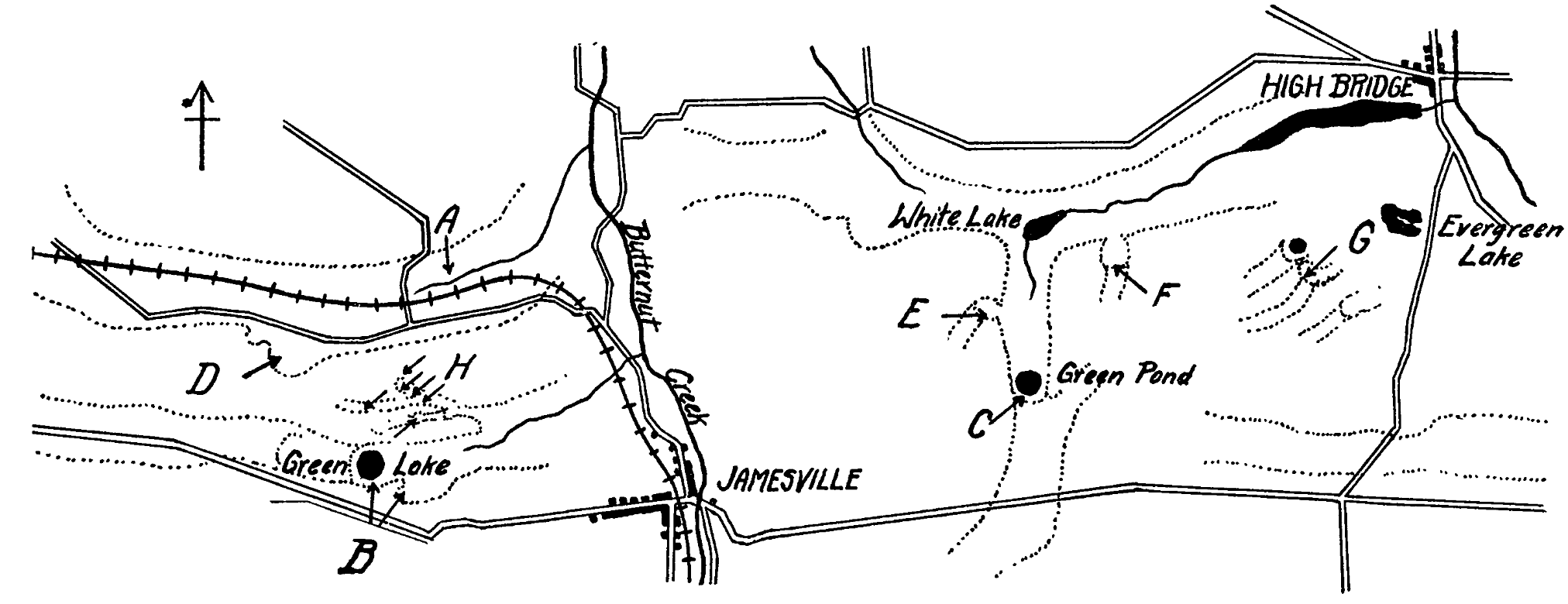
A map of the White Lake Natural Area in 1922, between Clark Reservation State Park and High Bridge, New York.

The White Lake area is part of the historic homeland of the Onondaga people. In 1866, J. A. Paine Jr. found populations of the Hart's-tongue fern around White Lake and Green Pond.

=== Corporate ownership (until 1997) ===
In the 1900s, the Solvay Process Company (later purchased by Allied Chemical) purchased a 2,500-acre (1,000 ha) tract of land for the purposes of mining that included the White Lake area. It opened a quarry nearby in the 1920s. Around this time, the company announced plans to fill in Green Pond. An effort to expand Clark Reservation State Park to include, and preserve, the ponds was unsuccessful. Before the pond was destroyed, a group of local botany enthusiasts transplanted around 700 Hart's-tongue ferns to Clark Reservation, between 1924 and 1925. Mining also filled in eastern portions of White Lake, but most of the tract remained undeveloped.

Into the 20th century, White Lake functioned as an informal recreation site for local inhabitants, who used the land as a site for walking, hiking, biking, and swimming, developing informal trails. As early as the 1920s, the county considered acquiring the land and developing it into a park. In 1929, the region was described by The Syracuse Herald as "one of the beauty spots of Onondaga County." Again in the 1970s, the state and county discussed purchasing the land from Allied, but the company was unwilling to sell. In 1978, 16 acres of nearby land were donated to The Nature Conservancy (TNC).

In 1986, ownership transferred from Allied to the General Crushed Stone Company. When Allied sold the property, they included a legal covenant that stipulated the White Lake area would remain natural, functioning as "buffer land" for the quarry. In 1992, the state Department of Environmental Conservation (DEC) included the area on its Open Space Plan, which listed natural areas that they considered worthy of preservation.

=== Development controversies (1997–2025) ===
In 1997, rumors began circulating that the land was going to be sold to an individual, prompting the town of DeWitt began working with TNC to try and purchase the land instead. By this point the land was operated by Benchmark New York.

In July, Scott Congel, the son of local real estate developer Robert Congel, formally purchased 461 acres (187 ha) of the land surrounding White Lake for $300,000. Upon the sale's closure, Congel was sued by several local inhabitants and TNC, who hoped to prevent him from building on the land, arguing that the land covenant restricted any development. The town of DeWitt filed a brief in support of the lawsuit. In October, the New York Supreme Court ruled in favor of Congel, and declared the covenant to have been invalid. In December began work to fence the land in and build his house.

The decision was appealed to the State Supreme Court, Appellate Division, and overturned. In 2002 an injunction was issued preventing further development of the land for housing. By 2008, the Congels had abandoned plans to build, and the land remained undeveloped.

=== Preservation ===
In 2025, Congel sold 459 acres (186 ha) of the land to Micron Technology, which donated the land to The Wetland Trust, a nonprofit that aims to preserve New York wetlands. Micron was required to purchase the land after a semiconductor plant that they constructed in the region destroyed forests where species of endangered bat lived. In 2026, the state DEC awarded almost $250,000 to Syracuse University to fund a project aimed at reducing the impact of phragmites in the wetland area.
