= Hunts Corners, New York =

Hamlet in Clarence, New York, US

Coordinates: 43°01′52″N 78°35′13″W

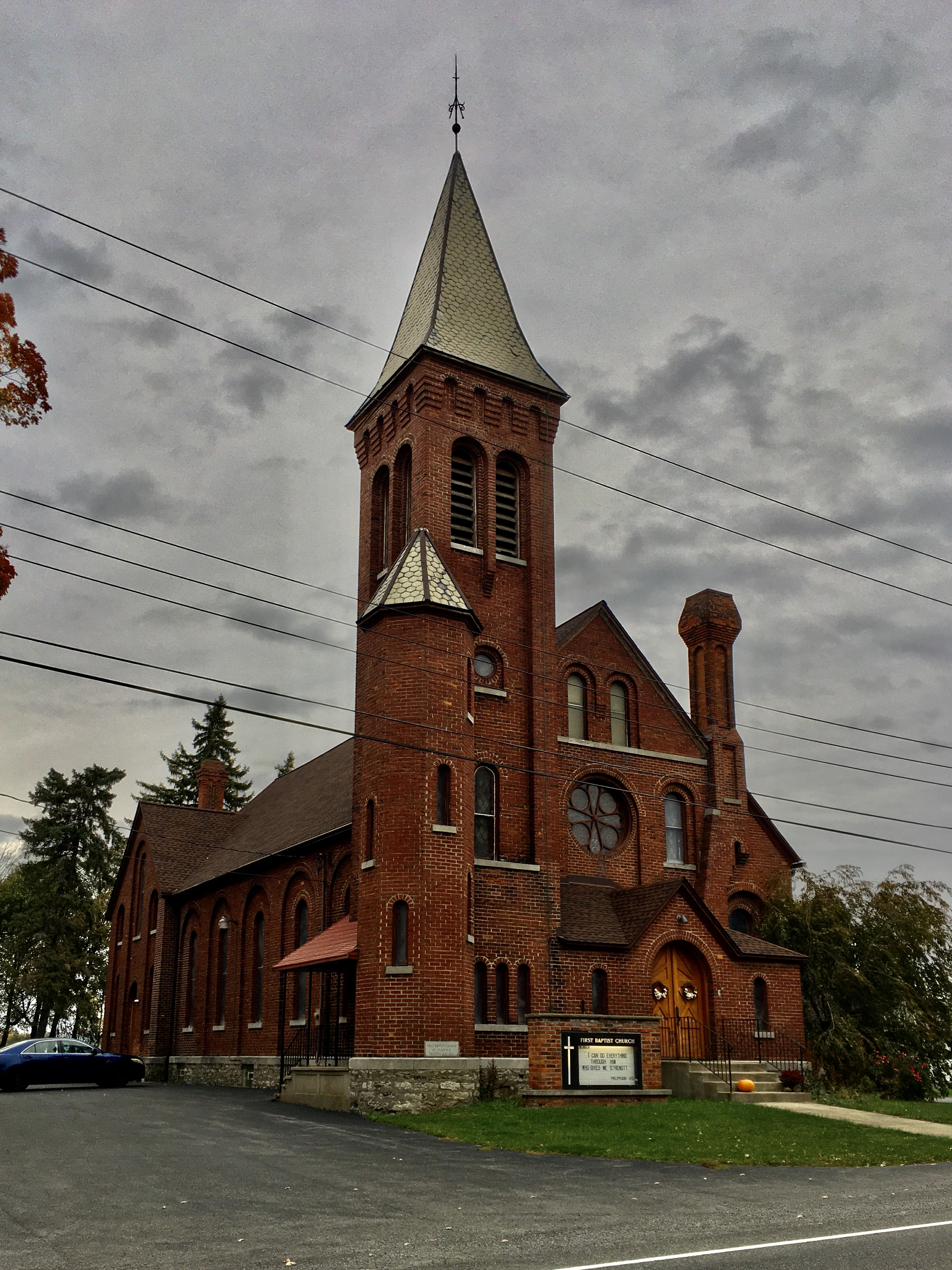
First Baptist Church

Hunts Corners is a hamlet in the town of Clarence in Erie County, New York, United States.
