= Himrod, New York =

- Hamlet
- Location within New York Location within the United States
- Coordinates: 42°35′23″N 76°57′18″W
- Country: United States
- State: New York
- County: Yates
- Elevation: 797 ft (243 m)
- Time zone: UTC-5 (Eastern (EST))
  - Summer (DST): UTC-4 (EDT)
- ZIP code: 14842
- Area code: 607
- GNIS feature ID: 952874

Himrod is a hamlet in Yates County, New York, United States. The community is 4.7 miles (7.6 km) north-northeast of Dundee. Himrod has a post office with ZIP code 14842, which opened on December 28, 1831.

== See also ==
- Himrod Junction (New York)
