= High Bridge, New York =

Coordinates: 43.014°N 76.012°W

High Bridge is a former hamlet located in the town of Manlius, New York in Onondaga County, just east of the city of Syracuse. High Bridge was founded around 1833 but was defunct less than a century later.

== History ==
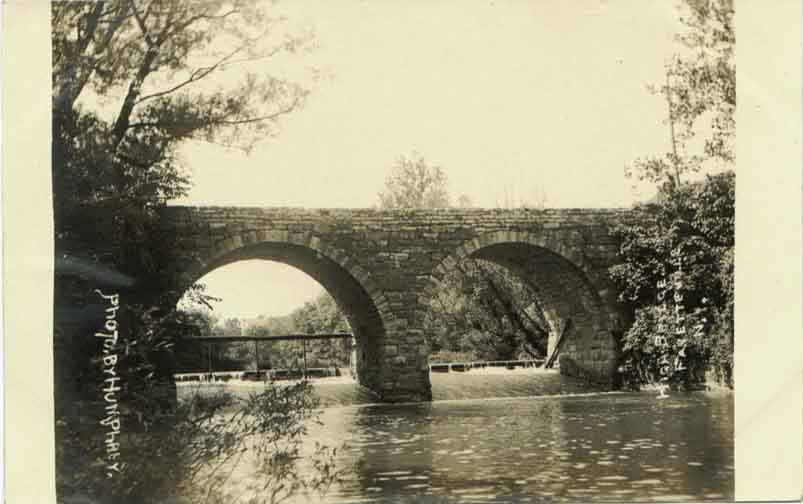
A postcard depicting the bridge over Limestone Creek that gave High Bridge its name, c. 1900.

The village was founded around 1833, shortly after the discovery of nearby mineral springs, which in its heyday were known as the "Elkhorn Dier Lick Springs" or "Balsley Springs" and thought to have beneficial medicinal properties. A one-room schoolhouse was built in 1849, and a double arch bridge in 1856. The community became known as High Bridge shortly afterwards. High Bridge was renamed to Elk Horn in 1880 in anticipation of the building of a post office; however, it was not built until 1895 and lasted just two years. The name then reverted to High Bridge. In the 19th century, several mills operated around High Bridge, powered by Limestone Creek and outflow from the White and Green Lakes. Other industry included a butcher block factory, which remained open into the 20th century.

High Bridge began to decline even as early as 1856 when many residents moved to the Midwest. A newspaper article published around the turn of the century described the area around the mineral springs as having been "practically desolation" by 1883, prompting their owner to fill in the springs. However, the village lasted until the nearby lime mines gave out in the early 1900s. The hotel burned in 1913, and the union church was abandoned in 1925. The 1849 schoolhouse was operated in the area until 1941; students were subsequently incorporated into the Fayetteville-Manlius Central School District.

Highbridge Road, now New York Route 92, runs from NY-5 at Lyndon Corners to NY-257 in Manlius. The arch bridge was replaced with a modern steel and concrete span in 1953, which was expanded in the 1990s.
