= Hornby, New York =

- Town
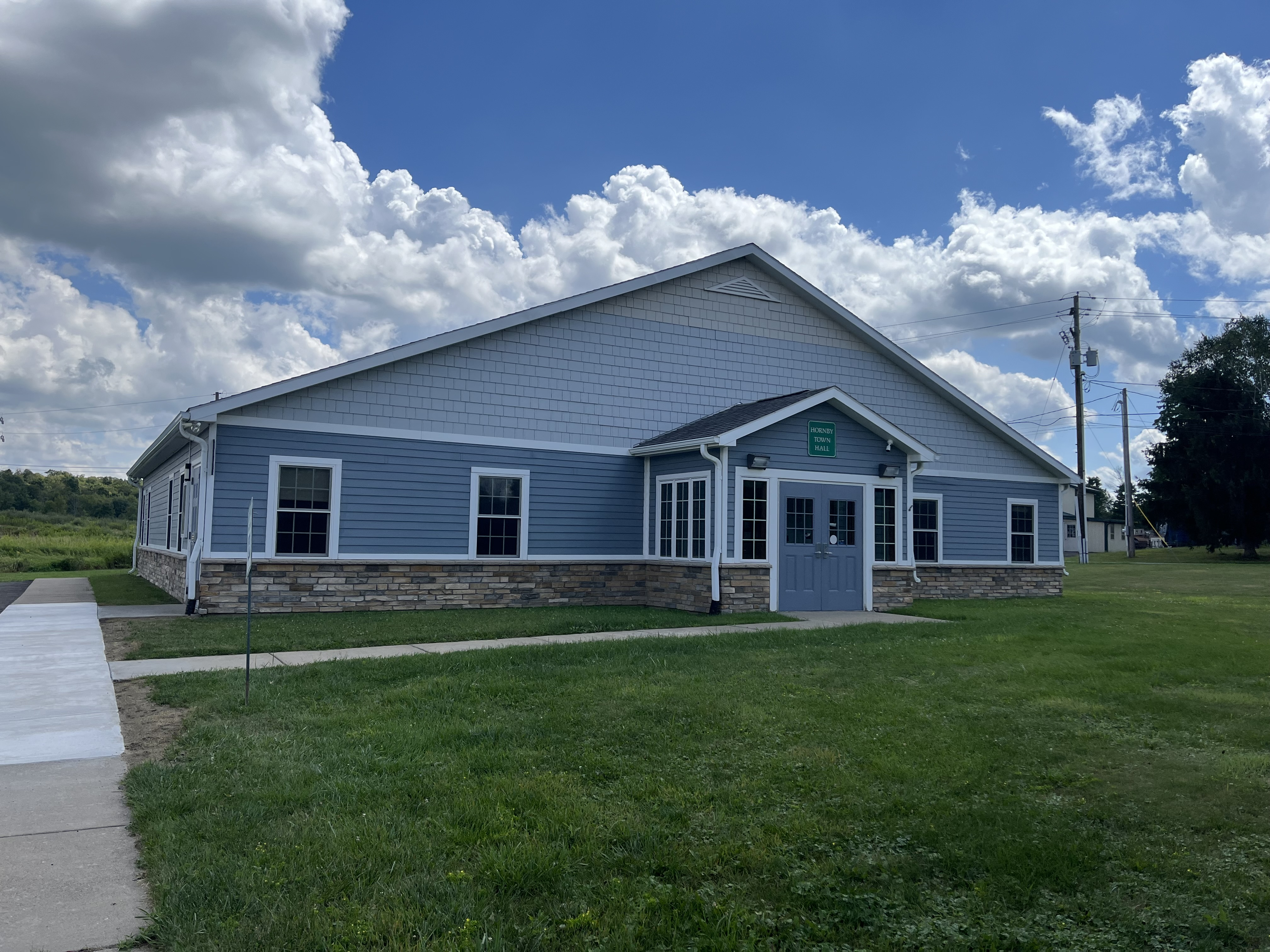
- Hornby Town Hall

- Location within the state of New York
- Coordinates: 42°13′38″N 77°1′36″W
- Country: United States
- State: New York
- County: Steuben

Area
  - Total: 40.89 sq mi (105.90 km^{2})
  - Land: 40.85 sq mi (105.80 km^{2})
  - Water: 0.039 sq mi (0.10 km^{2})
- Elevation: 1,617 ft (493 m)

Population (2020)
  - Total: 1,682 ▼
  - Estimate (2021): 1,674
  - Density: 40.9/sq mi (15.78/km^{2})
- Time zone: UTC-5 (Eastern (EST))
  - Summer (DST): UTC-4 (EDT)
- FIPS code: 36-35661
- GNIS feature ID: 0979077

Hornby is a town in Steuben County, New York, United States. The population was 1,682 at the 2020 census. The name is from John Hornby, a land owner of the Pulteney Tract.

The Town of Hornby is located on the eastern border of the county, north of Corning.

== History ==
The first settlers were Asa and Uriah Nash, in 1814. The town was created in 1826 from part of the Town of Corning (then known as "Painted Post"). In 1831, part of Hornby was used to found the Town of Campbell, and another part of Hornby was added in 1842 to the Town of Orange (now in Schuyler County).

== Geography ==
According to the United States Census Bureau, the town has a total area of 40.9 square miles (106 km^{2}), of which 40.9 square miles (106 km^{2}) is land and 0.02% is water.

The northern town line is the border of Schuyler County, and the eastern town line is the border of Chemung County.

New York State Route 414 crosses the southeastern corner of the town.

Dry Run is a small stream running through the town past Hornby village, and Post Creek runs through the southeastern part of the town.

== Demographics ==
Historical population
Census	Pop.	Note	%±
1830	1,572		—
1840	1,048		−33.3%
1850	1,314		25.4%
1860	1,291		−1.8%
1870	1,202		−6.9%
1880	1,209		0.6%
1890	1,011		−16.4%
1900	959		−5.1%
1910	870		−9.3%
1920	700		−19.5%
1930	683		−2.4%
1940	837		22.5%
1950	1,014		21.1%
1960	1,383		36.4%
1970	1,377		−0.4%
1980	1,786		29.7%
1990	1,655		−7.3%
2000	1,742		5.3%
2010	1,706		−2.1%
2020	1,682		−1.4%
2021 (est.)	1,674		−0.5%
U.S. Decennial Census

As of the census of 2000, there were 1,742 people, 613 households, and 464 families residing in the town. The population density was 42.6 inhabitants per square mile (16.4/km^{2}). There were 659 housing units at an average density of 16.1 per square mile (6.2/km^{2}). The racial makeup of the town was 97.30% White, 0.75% African American, 0.11% Native American, 0.57% Asian, 0.23% from other races, and 1.03% from two or more races. Hispanic or Latino of any race were 0.40% of the population.

There were 613 households, out of which 39.0% had children under the age of 18 living with them, 63.3% were married couples living together, 7.2% had a female householder with no husband present, and 24.3% were non-families. 17.9% of all households were made up of individuals, and 6.0% had someone living alone who was 65 years of age or older. The average household size was 2.84 and the average family size was 3.21.

In the town, the population was spread out, with 29.5% under the age of 18, 7.4% from 18 to 24, 29.5% from 25 to 44, 24.2% from 45 to 64, and 9.4% who were 65 years of age or older. The median age was 36 years. For every 100 females, there were 94.9 males. For every 100 females age 18 and over, there were 100.0 males.

The median income for a household in the town was $38,060, and the median income for a family was $41,389. Males had a median income of $34,821 versus $27,500 for females. The per capita income for the town was $16,743. About 9.7% of families and 12.3% of the population were below the poverty line, including 16.7% of those under age 18 and 13.2% of those age 65 or over.

== Communities and locations in the Town of Hornby ==
- Dyke – A hamlet south of Hornby village, located on County Road 42 and Cutler Creek.
- Ferenbaugh – A hamlet near the south town line on NY-414 and Post Creek.
- Hornby – The hamlet of Hornby is located on County Road 41 near the center of the town.
