= Handsome Eddy, New York =

Coordinates: 41°26′34″N 74°53′27″W

Handsome Eddy is a hamlet in Sullivan County, New York, United States.

It has frequently been noted on lists of unusual place names.
