= Hindsburg, New York =

Coordinates: 43.2539481°N 78.1058518°W

Hindsburg is a hamlet in the town of Murray in Orleans County, New York, United States. It is named after Jacob Hinds, a native of Arlington in Bennington County, Vermont. Hinds settled in Murray circa 1829 and purchased a farm from Jared Luttenton, who had previously constructed a dwelling on the lot. The area quickly became a point of shipping for wheat and produce by way of the Erie Canal and a warehouse was constructed by Hinds in 1830. With no stops between Albion and Hulberton prior to the establishment of Hindsburg, commerce grew quickly and businesses opened in the vicinity.

Shortly after the construction of the first warehouse, Joel, Darius, and Franklin Hinds arrived in the vicinity and partnered with their brother in establishing a framed hotel and dry goods store. A small settlement quickly developed at this location as settlers, traveling by way of the Erie Canal, departed north for Kendall after stopping at Hindsburg. The little village remained active in commerce until the completion of the railroad, at which time businesses waned and the population became stagnant. In 1894, the hamlet consisted of two warehouses, a store, blacksmith shop, post office, and approximately fifteen dwellings.
