= Hawthorne Park =

Public park in British Columbia, Canada

Coordinates: 49.195°N 122.827°W

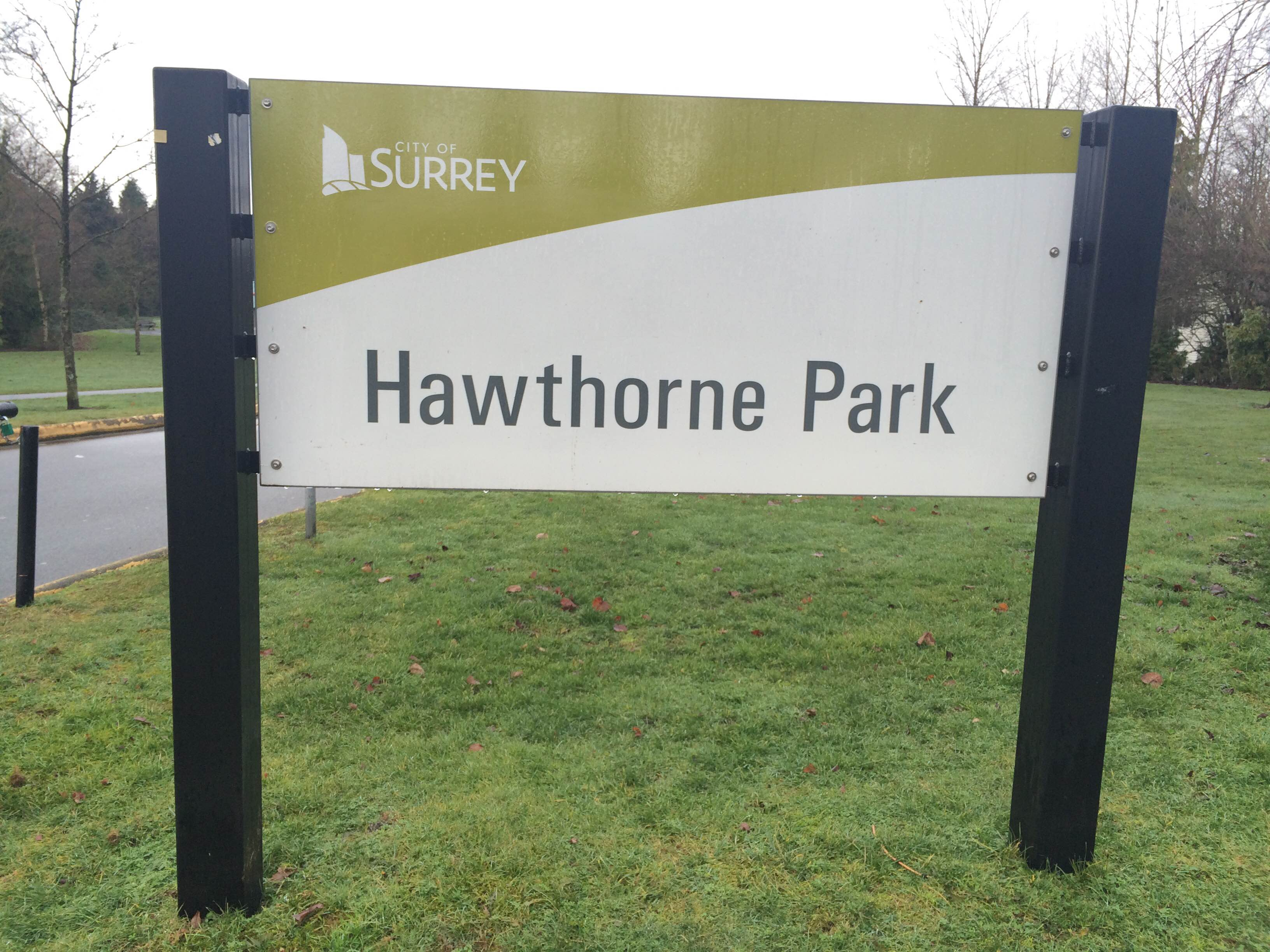
Main sign for Hawthorne Park

Hawthorne Rotary Park is a public park in Surrey, British Columbia. The park's main entrance is located along 144th Street and 104 Avenue. There are many other entrances that can be accessed by foot or vehicle. The park has a perimeter of 3.05 kilometers (1.90 mi) and an area of 0.23 square kilometers (0.089 sq mi). The park includes a water park, playground, picnic area, nature trails, ponds and two creeks. Hawthorne Park has a diverse ecosystem that contains a variety of invasive and native plants and animals.

== History ==
In 1973, the City Of Surrey discussed land expropriation for Hawthorne Park. By April 6, 1987, the Surrey City Council had decided that the Parks and Recreation Commission had not provided enough details to justify using $100,000 towards the Phase I construction of Hawthorne Park. The Surrey-Guildford Rotary Club presented a $20,000 cheque to Hawthorne Park on November 25, 1991, in honour of having the park named as Hawthorne Rotary Park. Satellite imagery shows that during 2004-2005 a gazebo was built as a central point for Hawthorne Gardens. The playground inside Hawthorne Park was renovated and was finished between 2011 and 2012. In the summer of 2000, the City Of Surrey Parks, Recreation, and Culture Department recommended the acquisition of two properties for the expansion of Hawthorne Park. These properties were located at 14350-108 Avenue, and at 14364 and 14372-108 Avenue. This area is now a part of Hawthorne Park.

== Physical geography ==
=== Geology ===
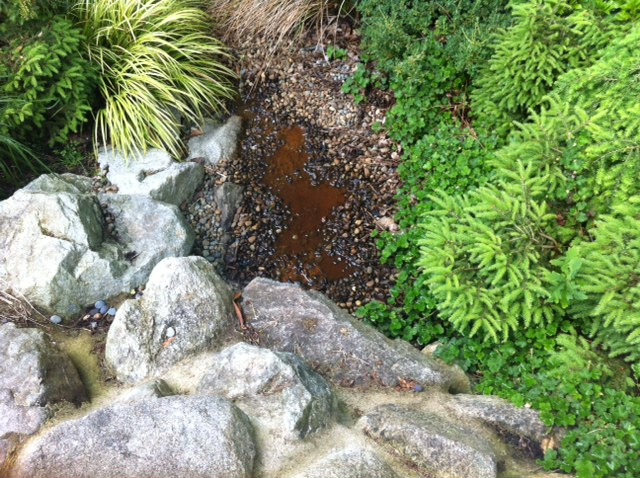
Iron in water

In Hawthorne Park, there are two bodies of water known as Bon Accord Creek and Hawthorne Stream. On the sides of the streams, large, white granite rocks line the edges. It is common practice for workers to position rocks in such a way, to prevent widening of the river through erosion. If the river were to widen, it could cause structural problems, or unstable grounds.

In Hawthorne Park, the soil has traces of till, iron, calcium, salt, and magnesium. Calcium is found from the heavy precipitation in the Guildford area. Iron is very common in stream paths and can be spotted if the area of water and rocks are tinted with a copper tone.

=== Landscape ===
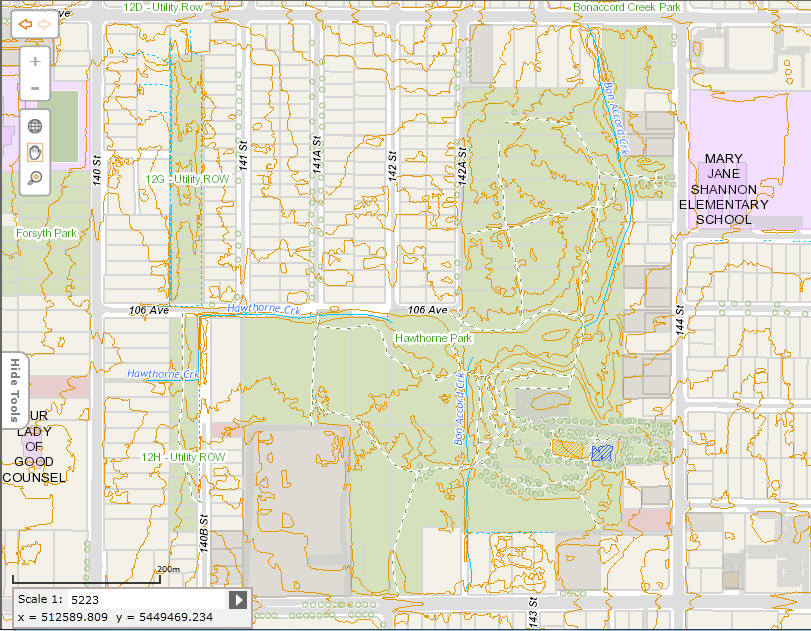
Hills in Hawthorne park

The landscape in Hawthorne Park is mostly flat with small hills and a parking lot. The elevation of Hawthorne Park varies between 101–106 meters above sea level, with the highest elevation being the main parking lot (49.194009, -122.825645), and the lowest being a patch of forest at 91–95 meters.

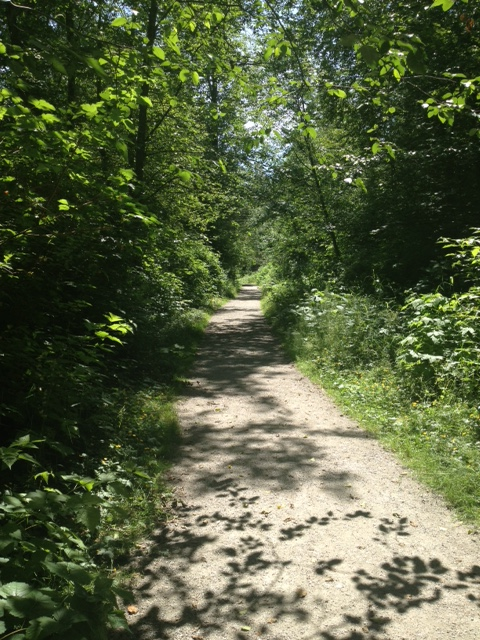
A Trail in Hawthorne Park

The land near Hawthorne Park could be considered fertile based on the many different types of berries and plants that grow in the area. This feature in the park makes it the perfect land for flowers and plants, which attracts different species of bugs and wildlife in the area. Hawthorne Park has many man-made aspects such as small wooden bridges, erratic boulders, small fences, and trails.

=== Trails ===
The trails at Hawthorne Park are approximately 2.6 kilometers long, and would take less than an hour to walk. Throughout this trail, many of the plants and animals that inhabit Hawthorne Park can be seen. The trails consist of 3/4 road mulch, causing the paths to be slightly rocky.

=== Hawthorne Creek ===
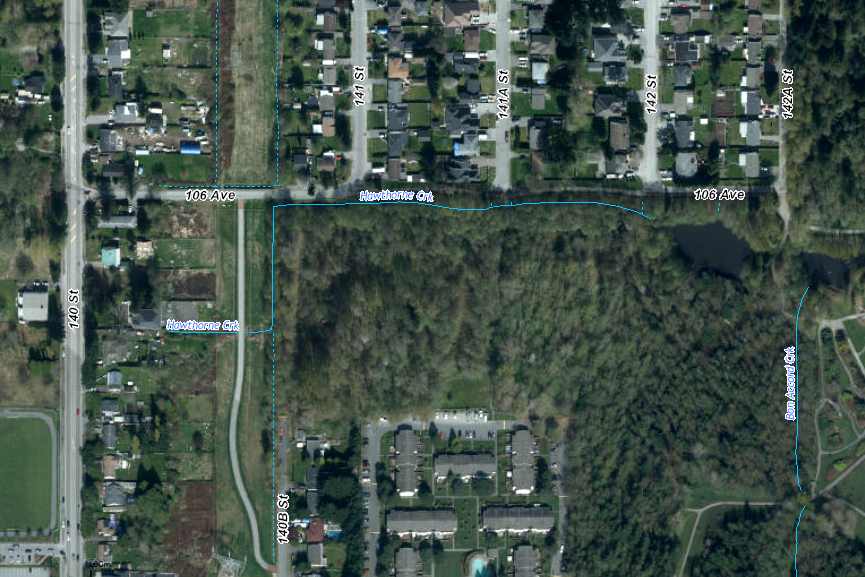
Hawthorne Creek

The source of Hawthorne Creek starts behind the properties on the southeast corner at the intersection of 140 Street and 106 Avenue. The creek proceeds to flow through another pipe under a small pathway that runs parallel to 140 Street. The water flows north for a short distance before being directed east along 106 Avenue eventually flowing into the pond at the center of Hawthorne Park.

=== Bon Accord Creek ===
Bon Accord Creek, which flows through Hawthorne Park, was named after a steamboat dock that was used in the late 1800s. Bon Accord was a piece of land northeast of New Westminster on the southern shoreline of the Fraser River which was pre-empted by William Ross, John Hasselwood and Robert Halloway. One of the uses of the land was for delivering cordwood up the Fraser River to Yale. In 1885, a fish hatchery also existed at this location next to Bon Accord Creek. Donald Mann, who worked in Canadian Northern Railway, purchased the land from the New Westminster Southern Railway. The name of Bon Accord then changed to Port Mann.

== Native plants ==
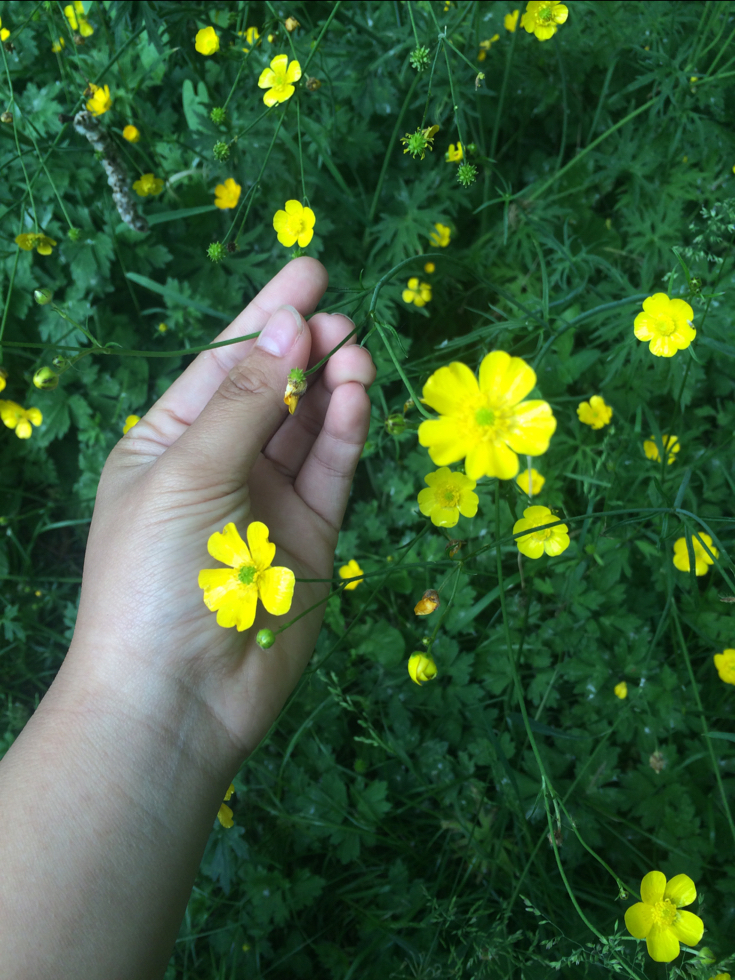
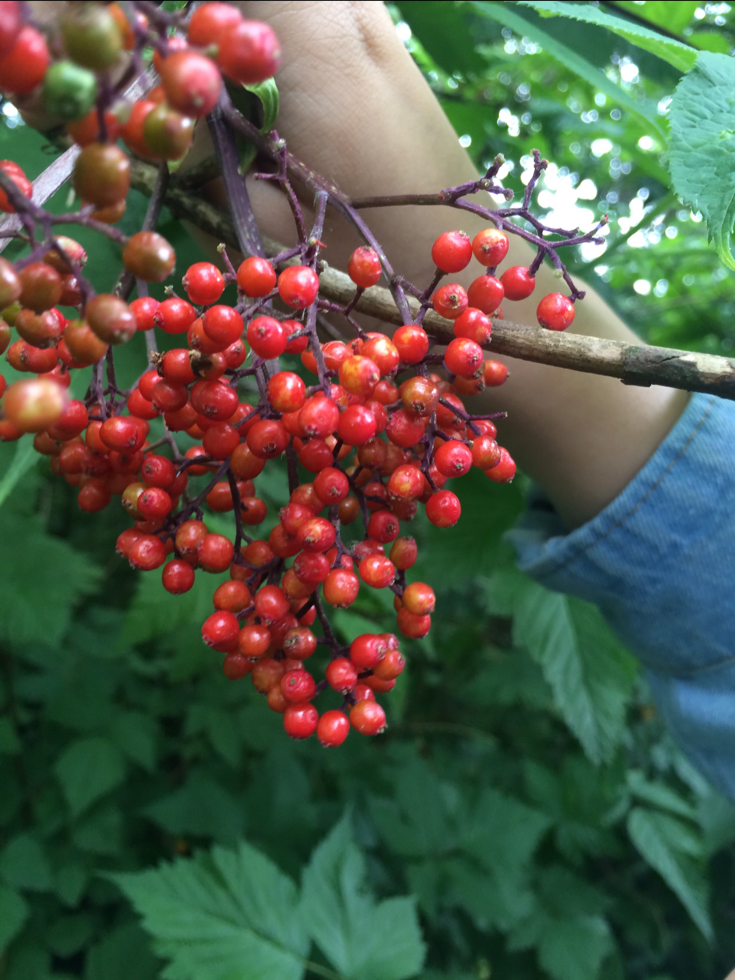
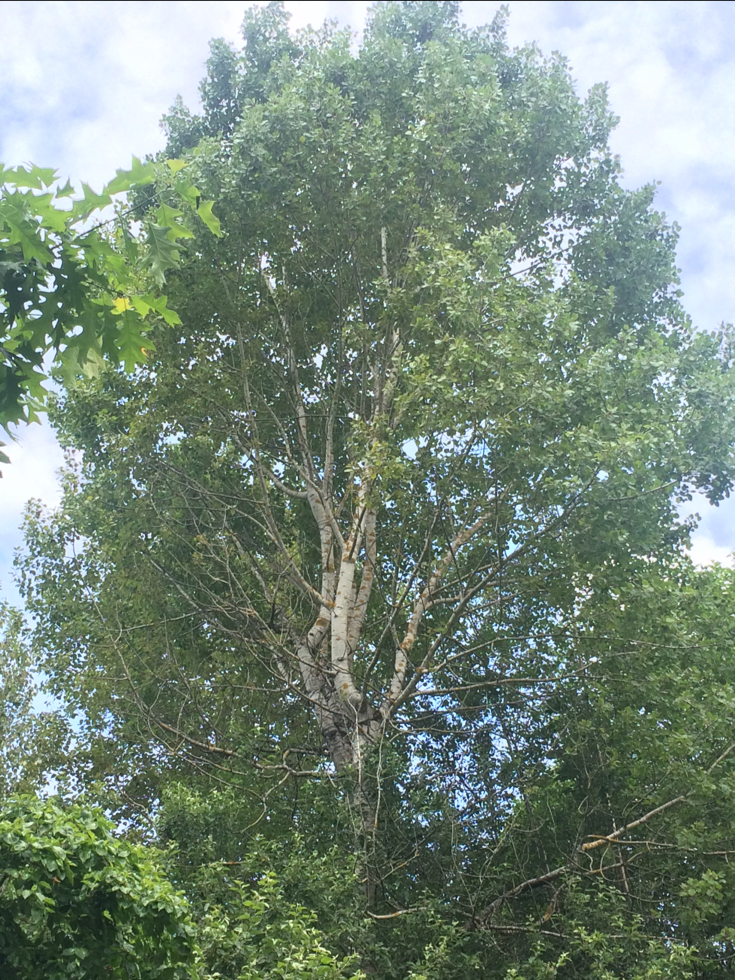
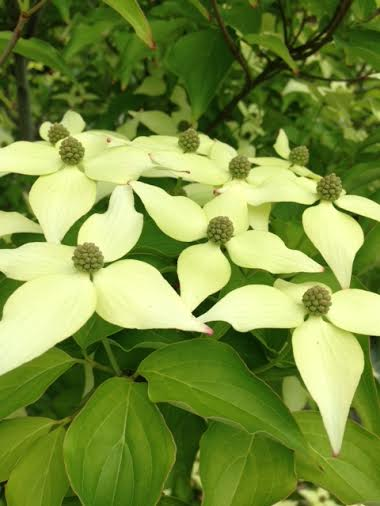
This Picture shows pacific dogwood, red elderberries, meadow buttercups, and a paper birch tree in Hawthorne Park.

Hawthorne Park houses an assortment of trees and plants, scattered around the nature trails and garden. Nursery logs in and around the park support plant life growing in the park. The native tree species inside of Hawthorne Park includes pacific dogwood, paper birch, and western hemlock. The native shrubs within Hawthorne Park include salmonberry, and red elderberry. Hawthorne Park has many native plants in its ecosystem that are common throughout the lower mainland such as grass, and meadow buttercups. Bracket fungi are one of the various native fungi growing in Hawthorne Park. There are semi-native plants within Hawthorne Park like mint and lavender located in the garden area, along with many other plant species and flowers. These plants were introduced into Hawthorne Park by humans, but pose no threat to the native species in the park.

== Native animals ==
The native animals in Hawthorne Park are the keystone species in the ecosystem, without them the environment would crumble and biodiversity would be lost. Native bird species in Hawthorne Park includes mallard ducks, bald eagles, and woodpeckers. Hawthorne Park possesses many mammal species such as coyotes, and squirrels. The garter snake is one of the many reptile species inhabiting Hawthorne Park. There have also been sightings of the great blue heron.

== Invasive animals ==
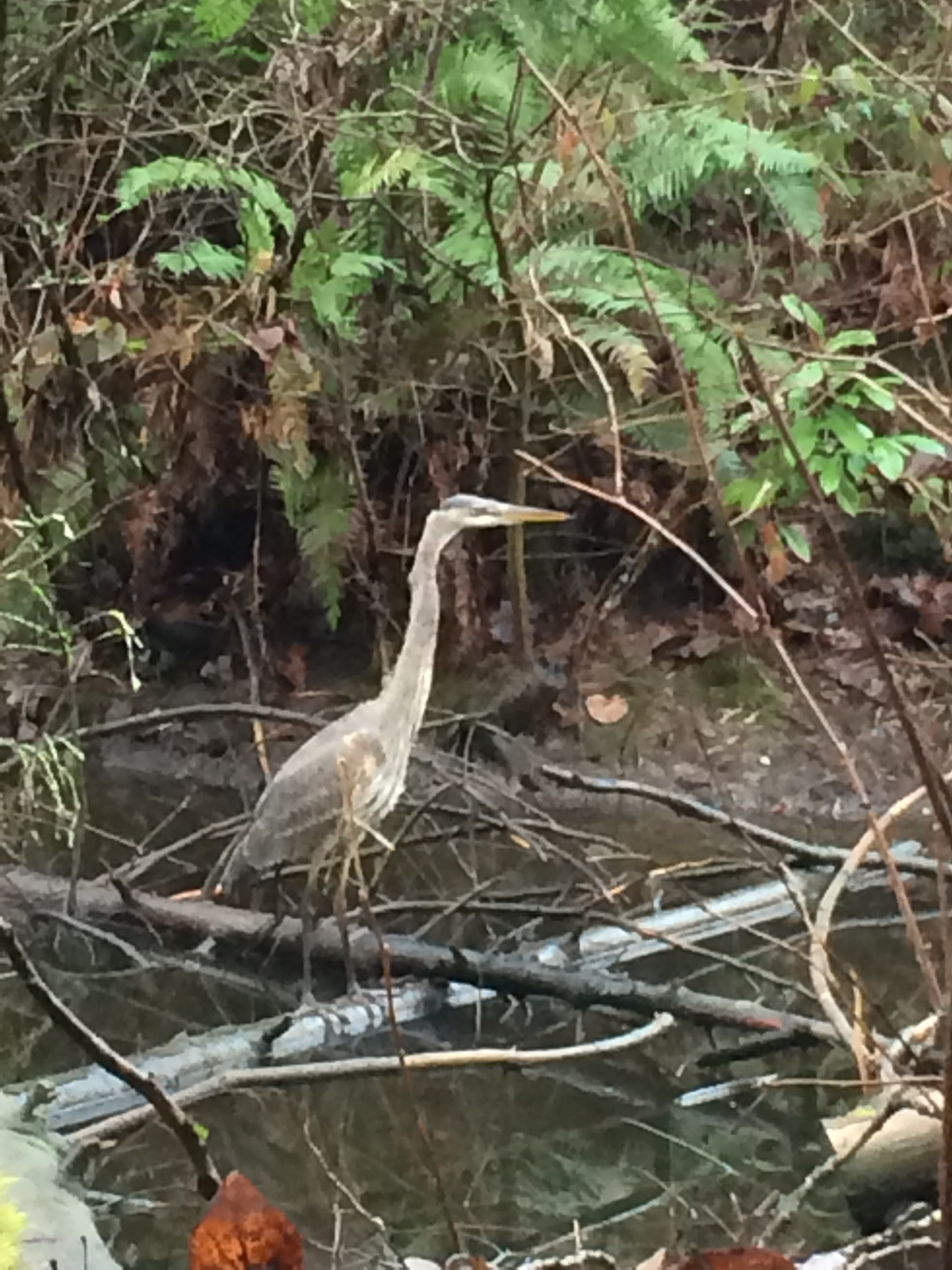
Blue Heron

The invasive species found in Hawthorne Park are the Eastern Grey Squirrel and the House Sparrow. The Eastern Gray Squirrel has a strong impact on the ecosystem. They are a highly invasive species and can be found throughout British Columbia, including Hawthorne Park. They compete with native squirrels for food and habitat, which results in the native squirrels becoming threatened or endangered. They were first brought to Canada in 1914 when eight of the squirrels were released into Stanley Park, Vancouver. The House Sparrow spends its time hunting other bird’s nests and eggs. It competes with other native birds for food and shelter, pushing the native animals out of their habitat. House sparrows were brought to Stanley Park, British Columbia in 1898, and later on migrated to Hawthorne Park.

== Environmental issues ==
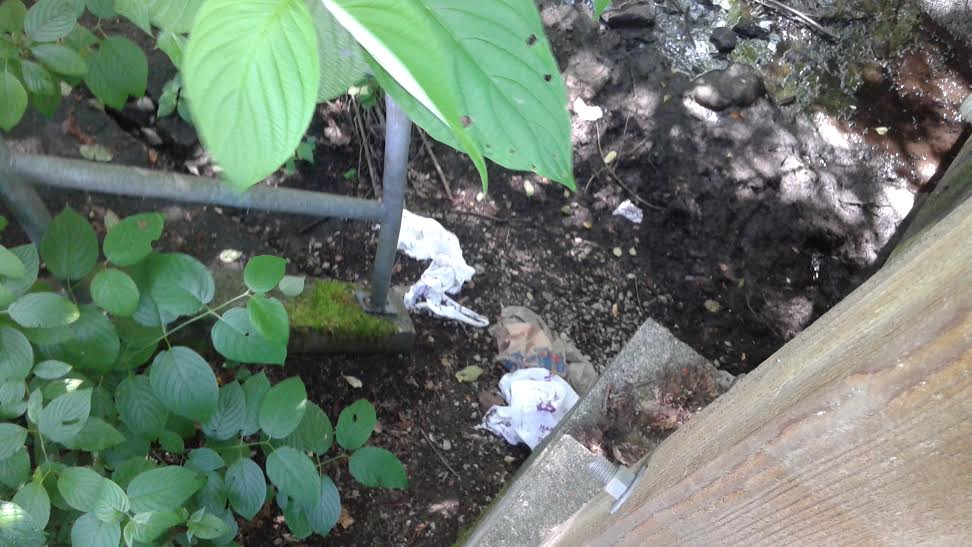
Pollution near Creek in Hawthorne Park

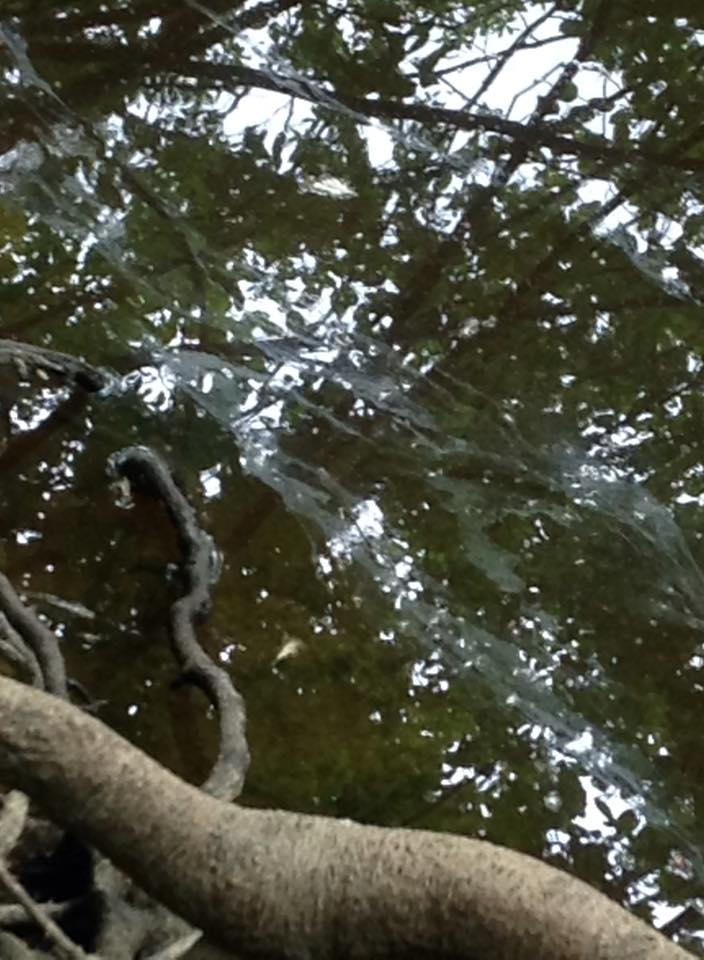
Traces of oil above the water

=== Land pollution ===
Land pollution is when pollutants or harmful chemicals get into the soil and change its quality. There is currently a large amount of litter in Hawthorne Park, mainly food packaging, cigarette butts or filters, furniture, and other garbage. Ducks, coyotes and other wildlife may ingest litter, which can block the intestinal tract of animals and result is disease or death. Furthermore, there is the chance that the animals at Hawthorne Park could get tangled up in plastic material and suffocate.

=== Water pollution ===
Litter and chemicals in Hawthorne Creek and Bon Accord Creek can change the pH level, affect the turbidity, and destroy habitats. An acidic or alkaline pH level can result in the death of insects, fish, and plants in the water, while a high turbidity prevents sunlight from reaching aquatic plants requiring photosynthesis. The origins of the chemical substances in the water can likely be traced to the storm drains, car fluids, cigarette butts or filters and possibly even drugs in the proximity. Cigarettes especially, can leak many toxic chemicals into the water that may harm the aquatic ecosystems. Aside from the chemicals, littering and the dumping of large objects destroy plant life, as well as the habitats of animals or insects. Animals, such as dogs, take in nitrates and nitrites from their food, if these nitrates are excreted and come into contact with the water, eutrophication can occur.

Water quality has been monitored since fall 2014, in a collaboration between students in a nearby school and the Take the Dip organization.
