= Hillside, New York =

- CDP
- Location in Ulster County and the state of New York.
- Coordinates: 41°55′5″N 74°2′0″W
- Country: United States
- State: New York
- County: Ulster

Area
  - Total: 0.82 sq mi (2.13 km^{2})
  - Land: 0.82 sq mi (2.12 km^{2})
  - Water: 0.0039 sq mi (0.01 km^{2})
- Elevation: 318 ft (97 m)

Population (2020)
  - Total: 860
  - Density: 1,050.7/sq mi (405.66/km^{2})
- Time zone: UTC-5 (EST)
  - Summer (DST): UTC-4 (EDT)
- FIPS code: 36-34786
- GNIS feature ID: 1852902

Hillside is a census-designated place (CDP) in Ulster County, New York, United States. The population was 860 at the 2020 census. It is located just south of the city of Kingston, and the Town of Ulster.

== Geography ==
Hillside is located at 41°55′5″N 74°2′7″W (41.9181, -74.0351).

According to the United States Census Bureau, the CDP has a total area of 0.8 square miles (2.1 km^{2}), all land.

== Demographics ==
Historical population
Census	Pop.	Note	%±
2000	882		—
2010	877		−0.6%
2020	860		−1.9%
U.S. Decennial Census

At the 2000 census there were 882 people, 336 households, and 276 families in the CDP. The population density was 1,048.8 inhabitants per square mile (404.9/km^{2}). There were 344 housing units at an average density of 409.1 per square mile (158.0/km^{2}). The racial makeup of the CDP was 95.24% White, 1.36% African American, 2.49% Asian, 0.23% from other races, and 0.68% from two or more races. Hispanic or Latino of any race were 1.81%.

Of the 336 households 32.4% had children under the age of 18 living with them, 74.7% were married couples living together, 4.5% had a female householder with no husband present, and 17.6% were non-families. 16.1% of households were one person and 10.7% had someone living alone who was 65 years of age or older. The average household size was 2.63 and the average family size was 2.90.

The age distribution was 25.3% under the age of 18, 3.6% from 18 to 24, 20.4% from 25 to 44, 31.2% from 45 to 64, and 19.5% who were 65 years of age or older. The median age was 45 years. For every 100 females there were 103.7 males. For every 100 females age 18 and over, there were 97.9 males.

The median household income was $80,095 and the median family income was $88,061. Males had a median income of $67,361 versus $50,536 for females. The per capita income for the CDP was $38,809. None of the families and 0.5% of the population were living below the poverty line, including no under eighteens and 3.0% of those over 64.

== Education ==
The school district for the CDP is Kingston City School District. The comprehensive high school of the Kingston City district is Kingston High School.
