= Himrod Junction (New York) =

Coordinates: 42.594286°N 76.955671°W

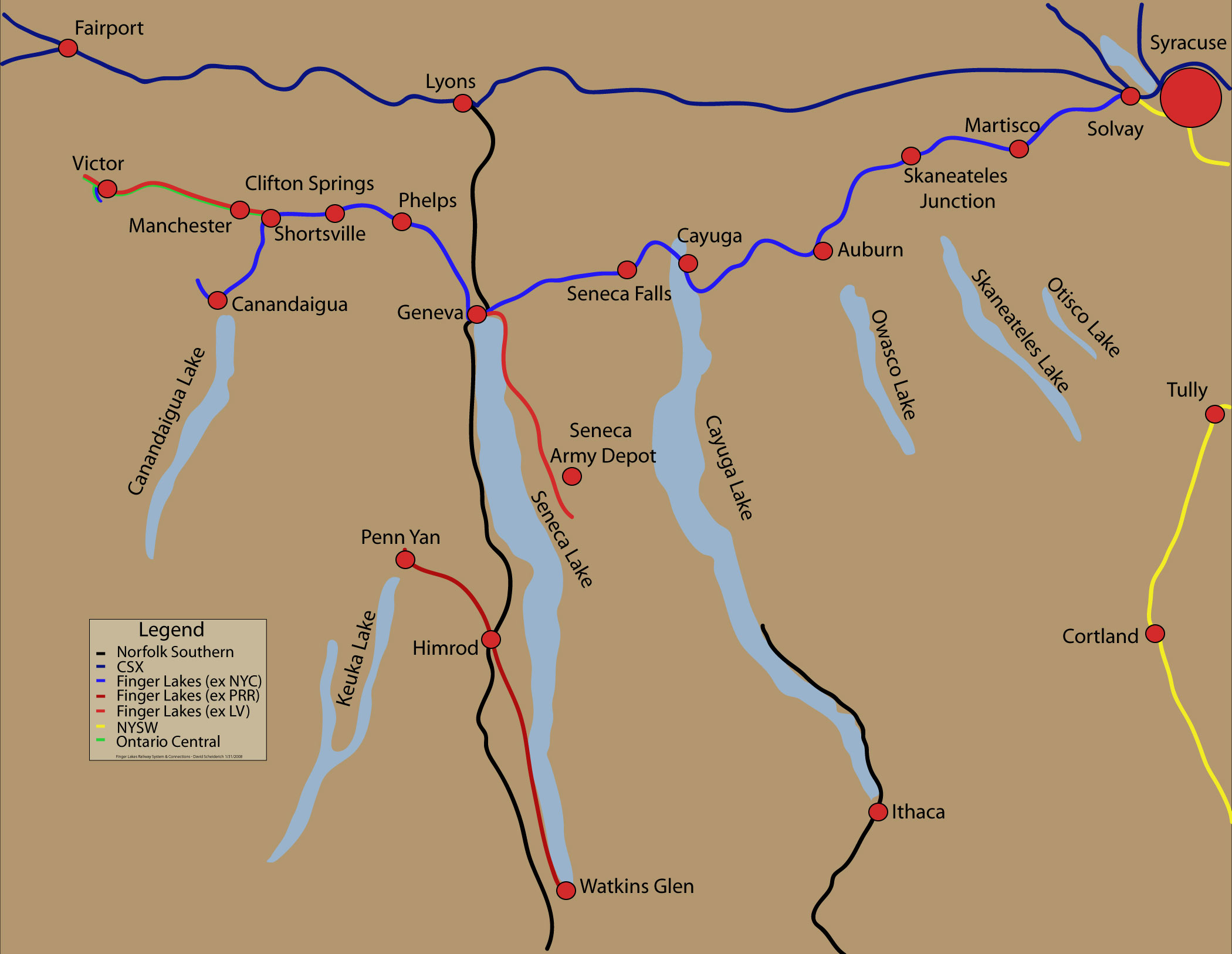

Himrod Junction is a railroad junction located in the town of Himrod, New York. It currently is where the Finger Lakes Railway accesses Norfolk Southerns's Corning Secondary line. Finger Lakes Railway uses trackage rights over Norfolk Southern's Corning Secondary from Geneva to Himrod Junction to access its branch line which spans from Penn Yan in the north to Watkins Glen, New York in the south.

== Railroad Activity in Himrod ==
=== Norfolk Southern's Corning Secondary ===
Norfolk Southern runs a local, round-trip freight train, symboled H06, from Corning to Geneva to interchange with FGLK Sunday through Thursday. This train usually runs in the early/late evening hours.

=== Finger Lakes Railway Penn Yan To Watkins Glen Branch line ===
Southwest of Himrod Junction, FGLK has a small yard in which staging and run-arounds for the local to Watkins Glen or Penn Yan is made. GW2 (Geneva, NY to Watkins Glen NY, round trip) serves the branch line on an as needed basis. GW2 will run to Penn Yan if needed. Runs to Watkins Glen are more regular than runs to Penn Yan.
