= Highland Lake, New York =

- Hamlet
- Location within New York Location within the United States
- Coordinates: 41°31′24″N 74°51′05″W
- Country: United States
- State: New York
- County: Sullivan
- Elevation: 1,332 ft (406 m)
- Time zone: UTC-5 (Eastern (EST))
  - Summer (DST): UTC-4 (EDT)
- ZIP code: 12743
- Area code: 845
- GNIS feature ID: 952786

Highland Lake is a hamlet in Sullivan County, New York, United States. The community is 12.4 miles (20.0 km) southwest of Monticello. Highland Lake has a post office with ZIP code 12743, which opened on June 18, 1897.

The lake is at an elevation of 1,339 feet (408 m) and covers a surface area of 198.3 acres (80.3 hectares). The maximum depth is approx 21 ft.

Since 2012, there have been no confirmed toxic algal blooms, although there was a suspicious bloom in 2019 (page 22 of 25).

== Notable people ==
- Melissa Gilbert (b. 1964), actress, Little House on the Prairie
- Timothy Busfield (b. 1957), actor, The West Wing
