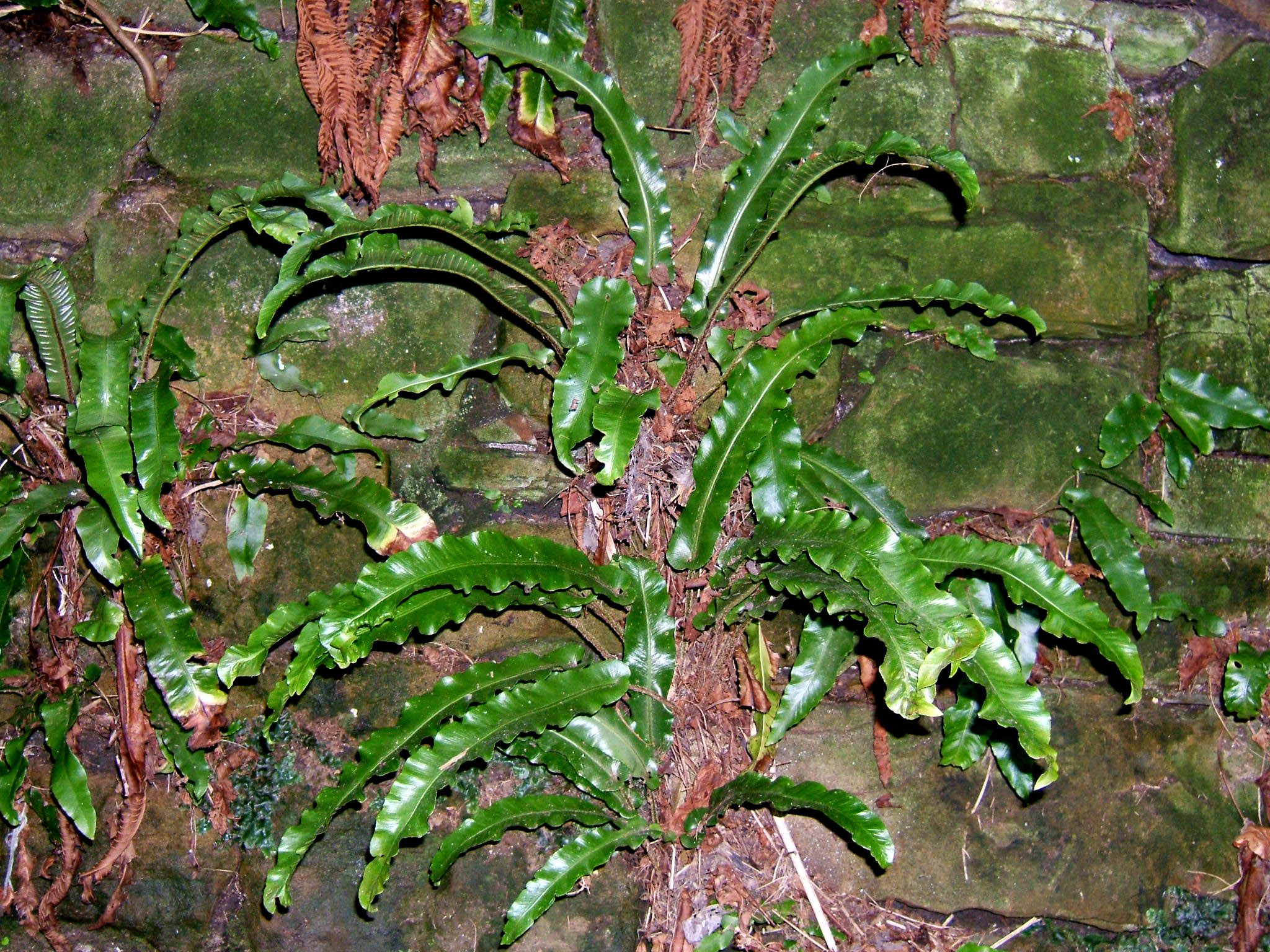

Conservation status
- Apparently Secure (NatureServe)

- Vulnerable (NatureServe) (var. americanum)

Scientific classification
- Kingdom: Plantae
- Clade: Tracheophytes
- Division: Polypodiophyta
- Class: Polypodiopsida
- Order: Polypodiales
- Suborder: Aspleniineae
- Family: Aspleniaceae
- Genus: Asplenium
- Species: A. scolopendrium

Binomial name
- Asplenium scolopendrium L.

Synonyms
- List: Asplenium scolopendrium subsp. antri-jovis (Kümmerle) Brownsey & Jermy; Biropteris antri-jovis Kümmerle; Phyllitis antri-jovis (Kümmerle) Seitz; Phyllitis fernaldiana Á. Löve; Phyllitis japonica Kom.; Phyllitis japonica subsp. americana (Fernald) Á. Löve & D. Löve; Phyllitis lindenii (Hook.) Maxon; Phyllitis scolopendrium (L.) Newman; Phyllitis scolopendrium var. americana Fernald; Phyllitis scolopendrium var. scolopendrium (L.) Newman; Scolopendrium lindenii Hook.; Scolopendrium officinarum Sw.; Scolopendrium scolopendrium (L.) H. Karst.; Scolopendrium vulgare Sw.

= Asplenium scolopendrium =

Species of fern in the spleenwort family

Asplenium scolopendrium, commonly known as the hart's-tongue fern, is an evergreen fern in the family Aspleniaceae native to the Northern Hemisphere.

== Description ==
The most striking and unusual feature of the fern is its simple, strap-shaped undivided fronds. The supposed resemblance of the leaves to the tongue of a hart (an archaic term for a male red deer) gave rise to the common name "hart's-tongue fern".

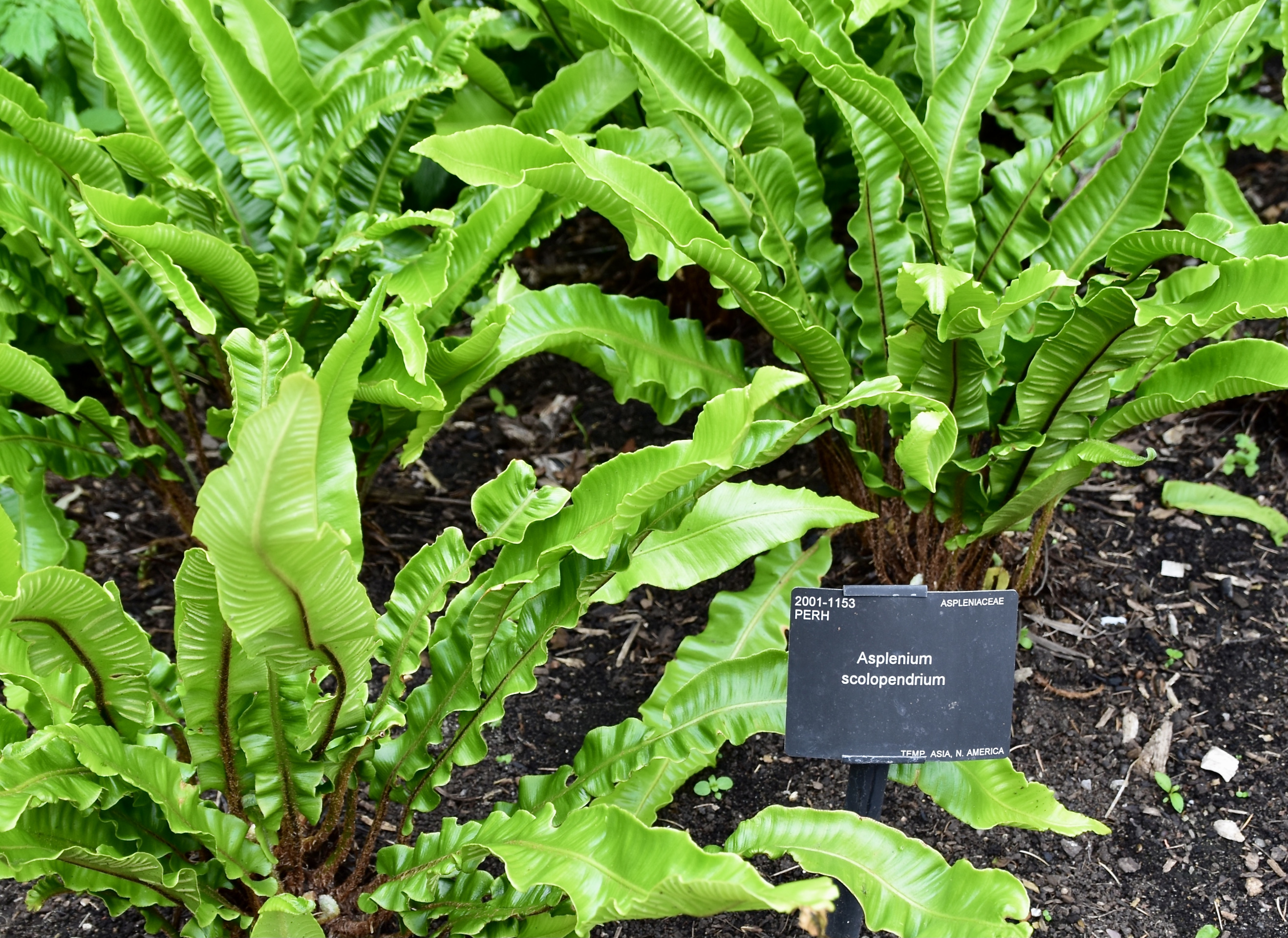
Asplenium scolopendrium

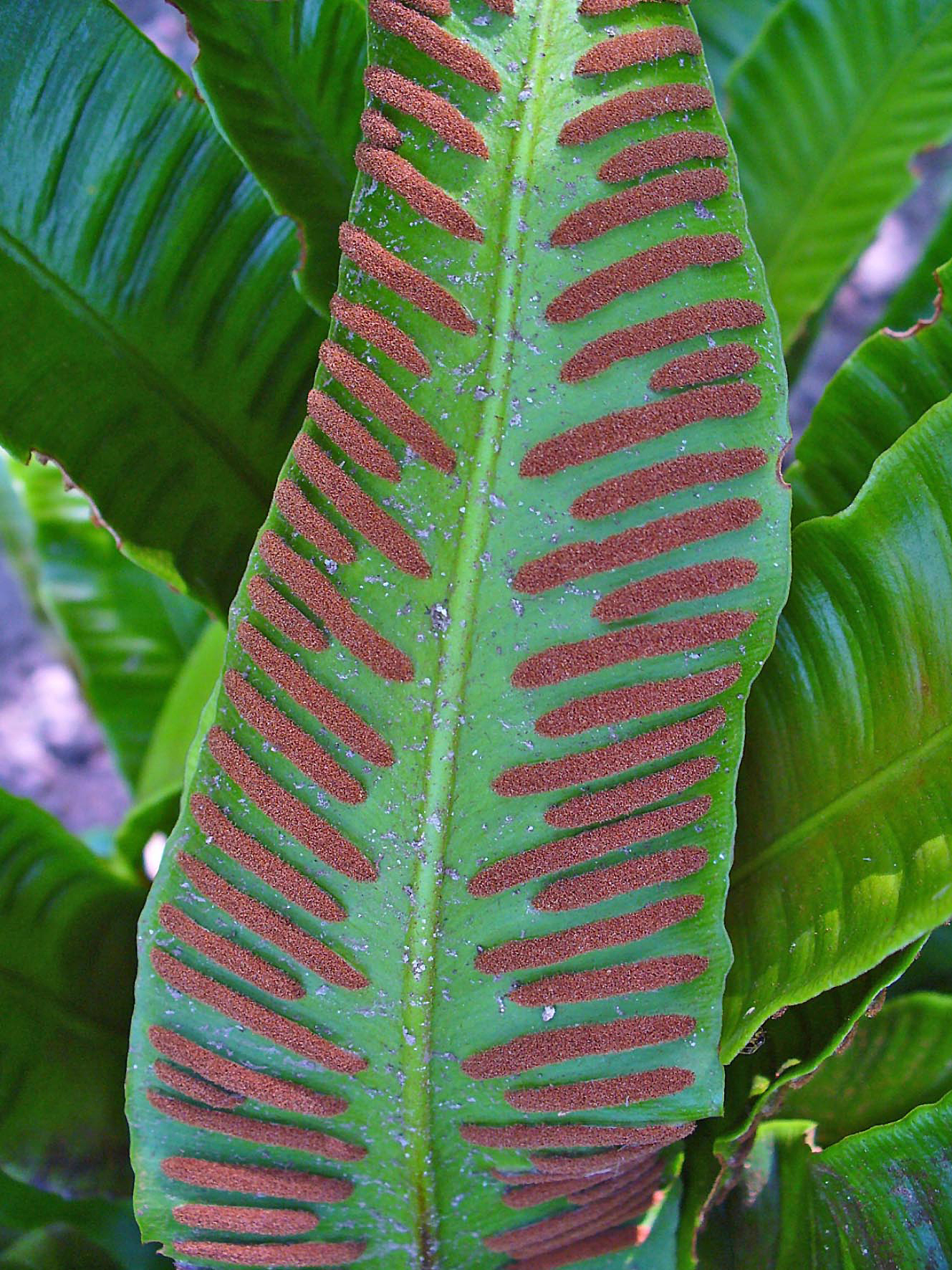
Asplenium scolopendrium sori

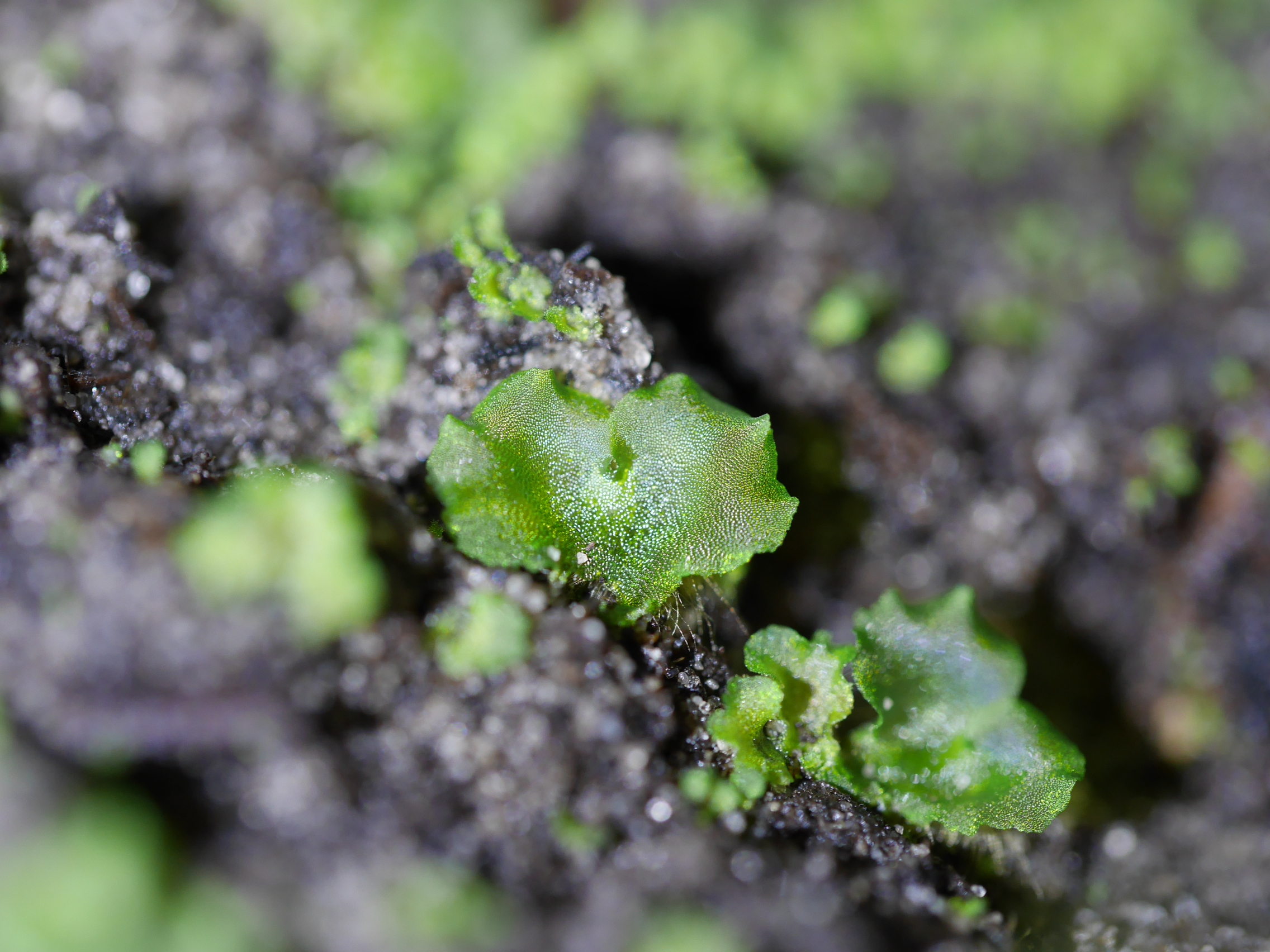
Asplenium scolopendrium prothallus

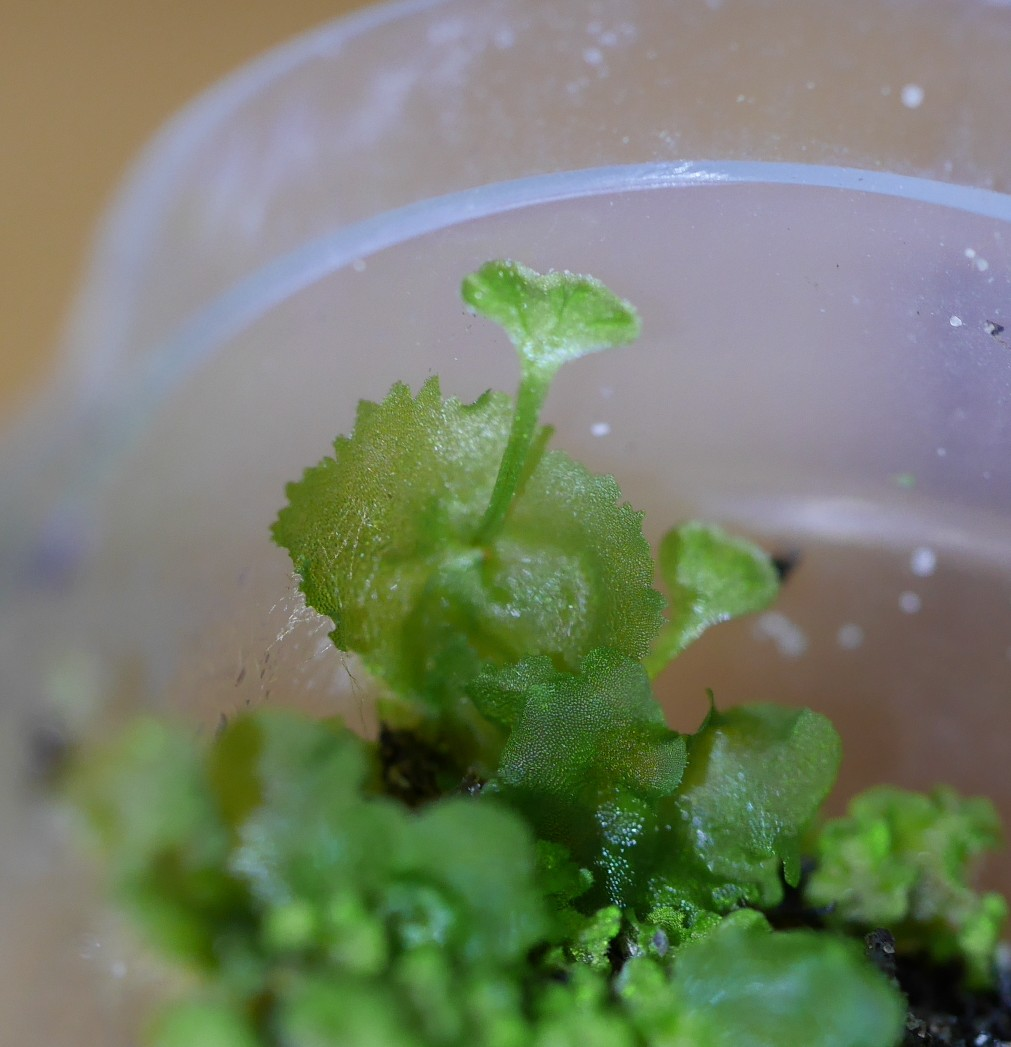
Young Asplenium scolopendrium sporophyte

== Taxonomy ==
Linnaeus first gave the hart's-tongue fern the binomial Asplenium scolopendrium in his Species Plantarum of 1753. The Latin specific epithet scolopendrium is derived from the Greek skolopendra, meaning a centipede or millipede; this is due to the sori pattern being reminiscent of a myriapod's legs.

A global phylogeny of Asplenium published in 2020 divided the genus into eleven clades, which were given informal names pending further taxonomic study. A. scolopendrium belongs to the "Phyllitis subclade" of the "Phyllitis clade". Members of the Phyllitis clade have undivided or pinnatifid leaf blades with a thick, leathery texture, persistent scales on their stalk, and often possess anastomosing veins. Members of the Phyllitis subclade have undivided leaves with freely branching veins and single or paired sori. They are widely distributed through the Northern Hemisphere. If defined to include the former A. komarovii, A. scolopendrium makes up the former segregate genus Phyllitis and is sister to A. sagittatum.

Three subspecies were accepted in the most recent revision of the species:

- A. scolopendrium subsp. scolopendrium is native to Europe, North Africa, the Middle East, and Central Asia. Populations in the eastern Mediterranean have been referred to as A. scolopendrium var. antri-jovis.
- A. scolopendrium subsp. americanum is native to Ontario in Canada, the United States, southern Mexico, and Hispaniola. The tropical populations have been referred to as A. scolopendrium var. lindenii.
- A. scolopendrium subsp. japonicum, formerly A. komarovii, is native to eastern Russia, China, Taiwan, and Japan

Morphological differences between the varieties are minor, but the North American variety americanum is tetraploid, while the Old World subspecies A. scolopendrium scolopendrium) is diploid.

== Distribution ==
Asplenium scolopendrium is a common species in the Old World:

- The subspecies scolopendrium occurs throughout Europe (including the Caucasus and the British Isles). It is absent however in northeast Europe (Finland, Belarus, Latvia, Lithuania and European Russia). Beyond Europe, it is found in the Middle East, and North Africa (in Morocco, Algeria, Tunisia and Libya, as well as the Canary Islands). It has also been introduced to the Falkland Islands. Unlike its American counterpart, the scolopendrium of Europe is used for many horticultural uses. Specimens of this variety found in North America (such as in New Brunswick and Ontario in Canada, and Maryland in the United States) are considered naturalized descendants of cultivated plants.

In North America, it occurs in rare, widely scattered populations located in different locales:

- in the Mexican states of Chiapas, Coahuila, Nuevo León, and Oaxaca, as well as the Caribbean island of Hispaniola (in Haiti).
- along the Onondaga Limestone and Niagara Escarpment geological formations in Central New York (present in two counties), southern Ontario (present in seven counties), and the eastern Upper Peninsula in Michigan (present in two counties). Exceptions are disjunct populations that exist in Alabama (in Fern Cave National Wildlife Refuge, a wildlife refuge centered around an off-limits cave in Jackson County, Alabama, where it has declined heavily due to illegal plant collecting, and an undisclosed pit in Morgan County that is also off-limits and protected), and Tennessee (in just a single county); these southern populations are at dire risk of extirpation. An introduced population descended from New York plants is found in New Jersey; it is a remnant of a 1936 effort to practice ex-situ conservation of populations in New York.
- In 2020, a new population of hart's-tongue ferns was discovered inside a cave with basaltic lava flows in El Malpais National Monument, Cibola County, New Mexico; this represents the first confirmed population of the species in North America west of the Mississippi. Genetic analyses and surveys are currently being performed to determine the population's variation and overall health.

In East Asia, A. scolopendrium subsp. japonicum is distributed in the Russian Far East, north-eastern China and the Korean Peninsula, however it is considered as being generally rare on the mainland. In contrast, it is relatively abundant on many islands including the Japanese Archipelago.

The unique dispersal of Asplenium scolopendrium has caught the attention of international botanists. In fact, the very existence of such varieties beg that "...these populations arose following colonization events involving a single spore".

== Habitat ==
The plants grow on neutral, calcium-rich, and/or lime-rich substrates under deciduous hardwood canopies (usually sugar maples in eastern North America), including moist soil and damp crevices in old walls; they are found most commonly in shaded areas. Plants in full sun are usually stunted and yellowish in colour, while those in full shade are dark green and healthy. The disjunct populations of the North American variation in the southeastern US are found exclusively in sinkhole pits or limestone caves. These populations may be relics of cooler Pleistocene climates.

== Conservation ==
The most recent International Union for Conservation of Nature (IUCN) assessment for The IUCN Red List of Threatened Species was conducted in 2016, with the conservation status of Asplenium scolopendrium being listed as being a species of Least Concern (LC). Despite the positive status, this assessment is chiefly limited to the conservation situation of A. scolopendrium in Europe, as opposed to other parts of its natural range.

=== Europe ===
Asplenium scolopendrium is found across the vast majority of European countries, in a wide variety of natural settings, across a multitude of habitats. It is also able to colonise manmade environments including growing in walls and brickwork crevices, particularly in limestone mortar. Furthermore, it is considered to be a gregarious species – it is able to spread both sexually and asexually, frequently forming large clumps and present in high densities – in some areas it is considered very common.

Across Europe as a whole, the IUCN assessed no immediate threats to this species in natural settings, and predicted that the species may benefit from milder wetter winters predicted under various climate change scenarios. In the urban environment, where A. scolopendrium frequently grows on vertical faces and in crevices of lime mortared brick walls, the species may be threatened by wall renovation projects. Although the fern is often cultivated as a garden plant or used in landscape planting, commercially sold plants are sourced from horticultural stock.

Asplenium scolopendrium is not a specifically protected species in the majority of European states, however in part due to its wide distribution, A. scolopendrium inhabits a large number of legally protected areas across the continent. Despite this, it is considered to be declining in numbers or a species at risk in certain parts of its range. Asplenium scolopendrium was first listed as "Vulnerable" in the National Red Lists for Albania in 2014 and Norway in 2010 (under Criterion D1, that is, having a very small population of under 1000 individuals). It is considered "critically threatened and rare" in the Czech Republic's 2012 plant Red List; and "Endangered" in Sweden's 2010 Red List.

=== North America ===
==== United States ====
In the United States, A. scolopendrium var. americanum was declared endangered by the U.S. Fish and Wildlife Service in 1989. The reasons for its rarity are currently being researched, with reintroduction programs in New York and elsewhere also in development.

==== Canada ====
Ontario, Canada has the highest population numbers of A. scolopendrium var. americanum of any region in the variation's distribution, with around 80% of all subpopulations and around 94% of all individuals. The fern was reported at more than 100 sites across the province, with around 75 still believed to be existing. Despite this, A. scolopendrium var. americanum was listed as a species of Special Concern under the Committee on the Status of Species at Risk in Ontario in May 2017, due to its extremely specific habitat requirements, relatively small distribution, and some subpopulations consisting of too little individuals.

== Uses ==
=== Cultivation ===
Asplenium scolopendrium is often grown as an ornamental plant, with several cultivars selected with varying frond form, including with frilled frond margins, forked fronds and cristate forms. The species has gained the Royal Horticultural Society's Award of Garden Merit, as has the cultivar 'Angustatum'.

The American variety is reputed to be difficult to cultivate (making conservation efforts for it even more troublesome); due to this, most, if not all, cultivated individuals are derived from the Old World subspecies.

=== Herbal medicine ===
This fern was used in the 1800s as a medicinal plant in folk medicine as a spleen tonic (hence an archaic name for the genus, "spleenworts") and for other uses.

=== Other uses ===
A manuscript written by Katharine Palmer in the 18th century contains a recipe for hart's-tongue ale.

== Gallery ==
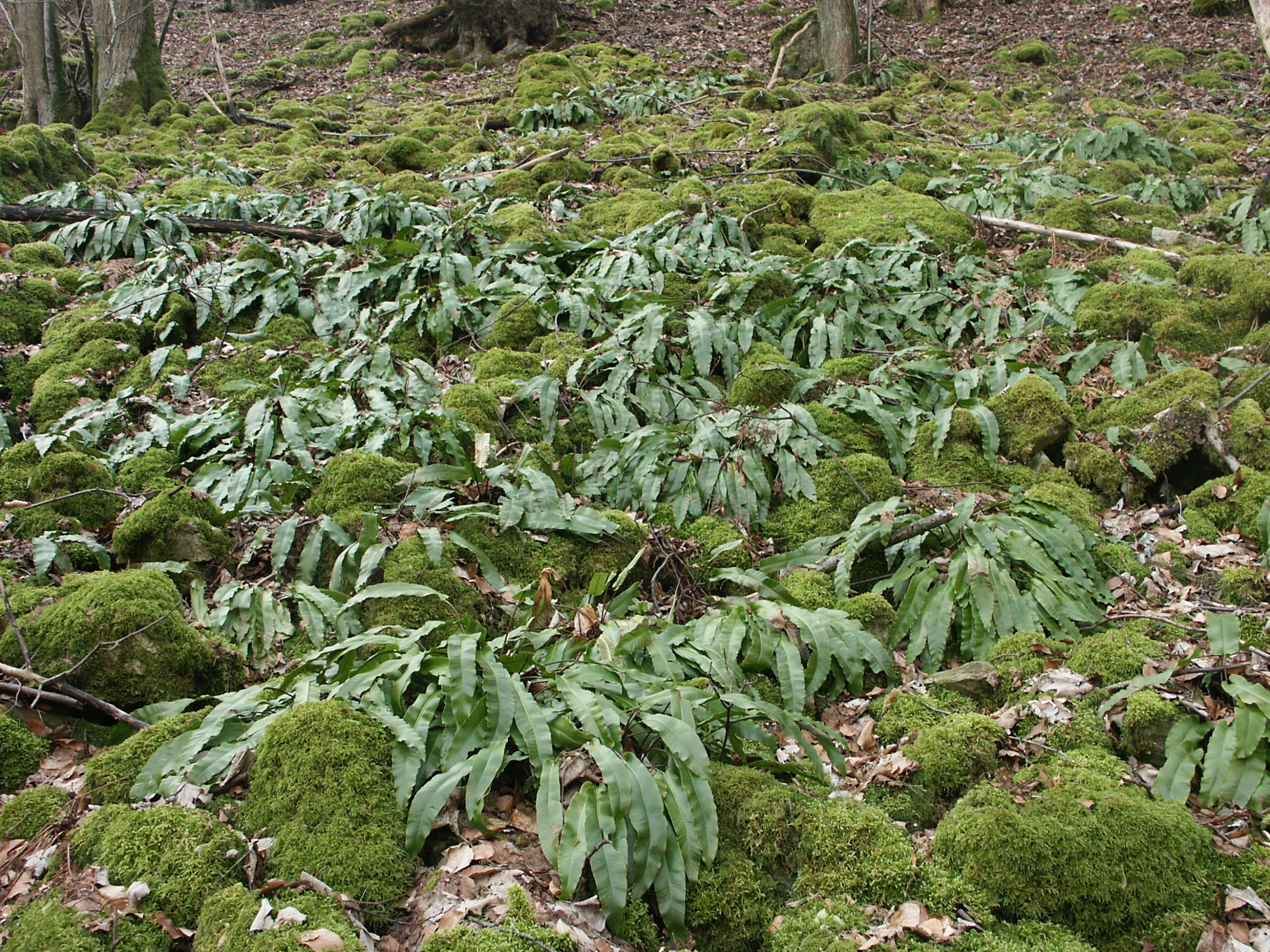
Habitat

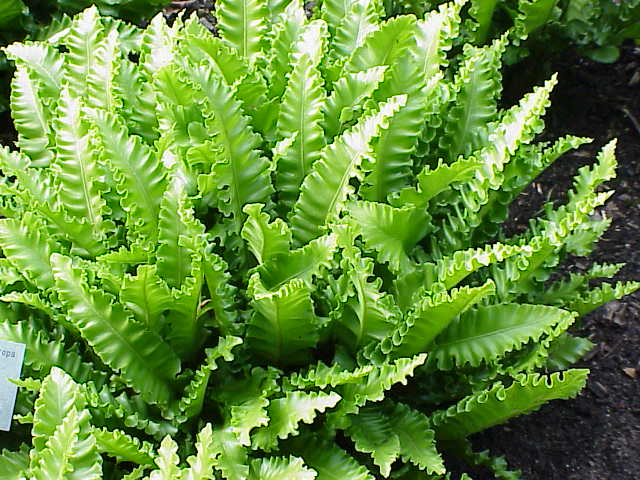
A cultivar with frilled frond margins

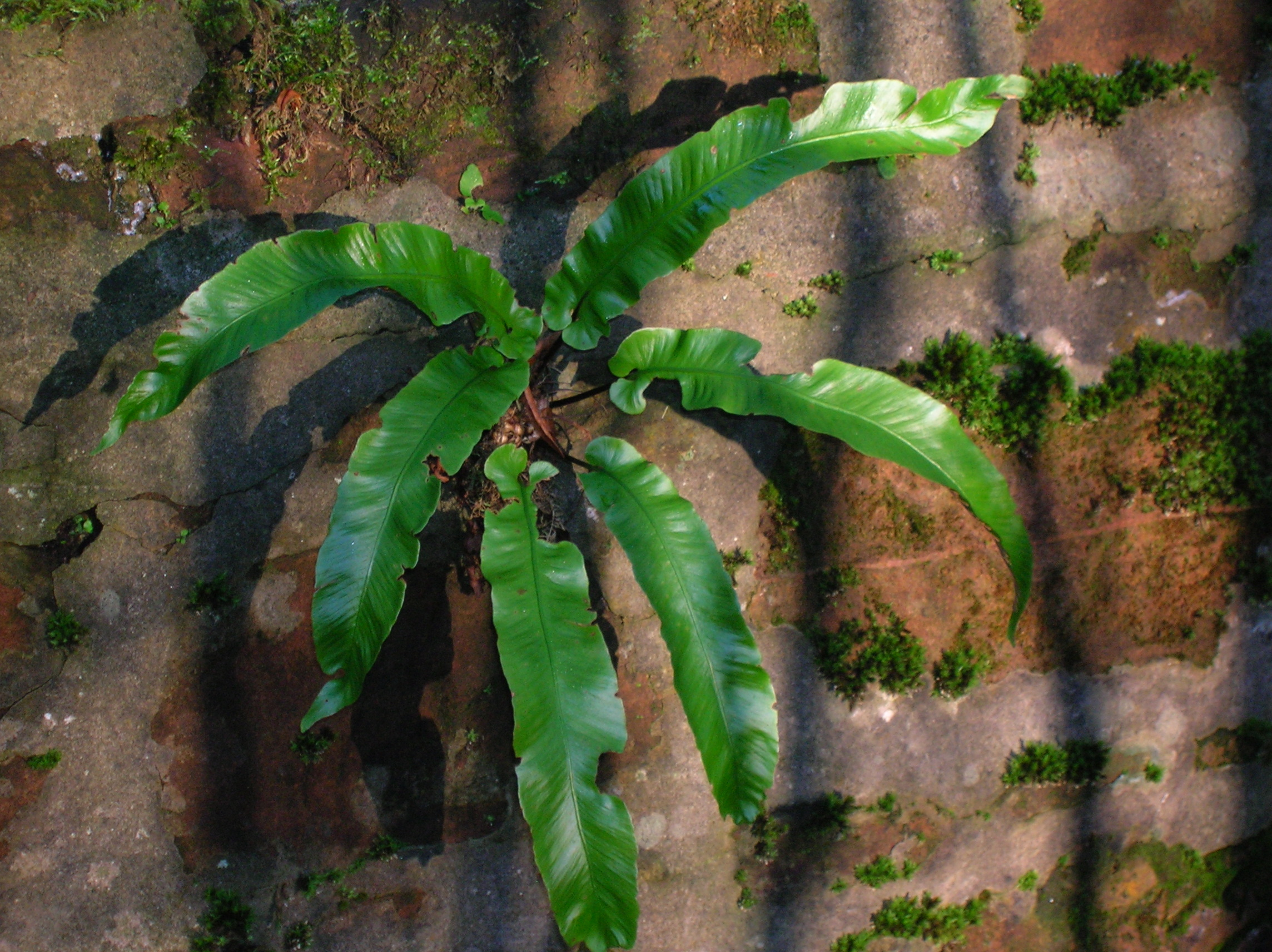
A specimen growing in lime mortar on a wall

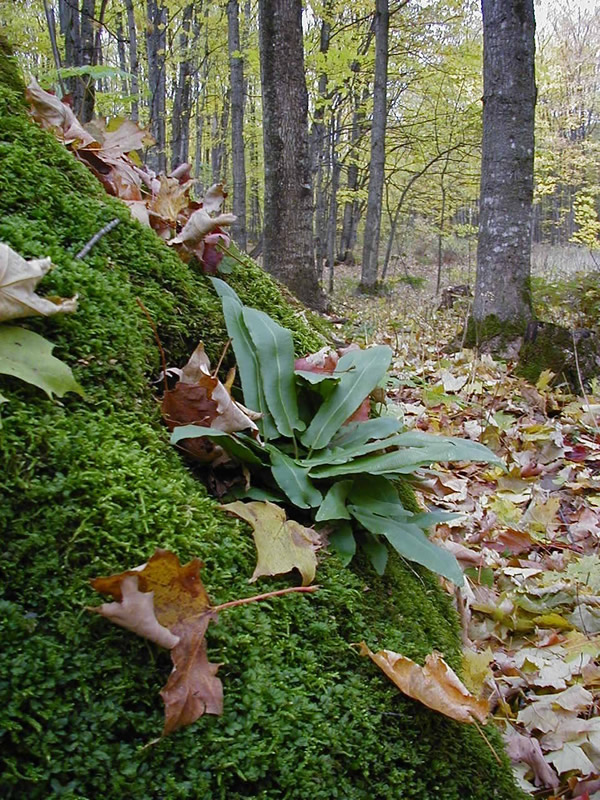
Example of the North American variety
