= Balsam Mountain (Ulster County, New York) =

28th highest peak of Catskill Mountains

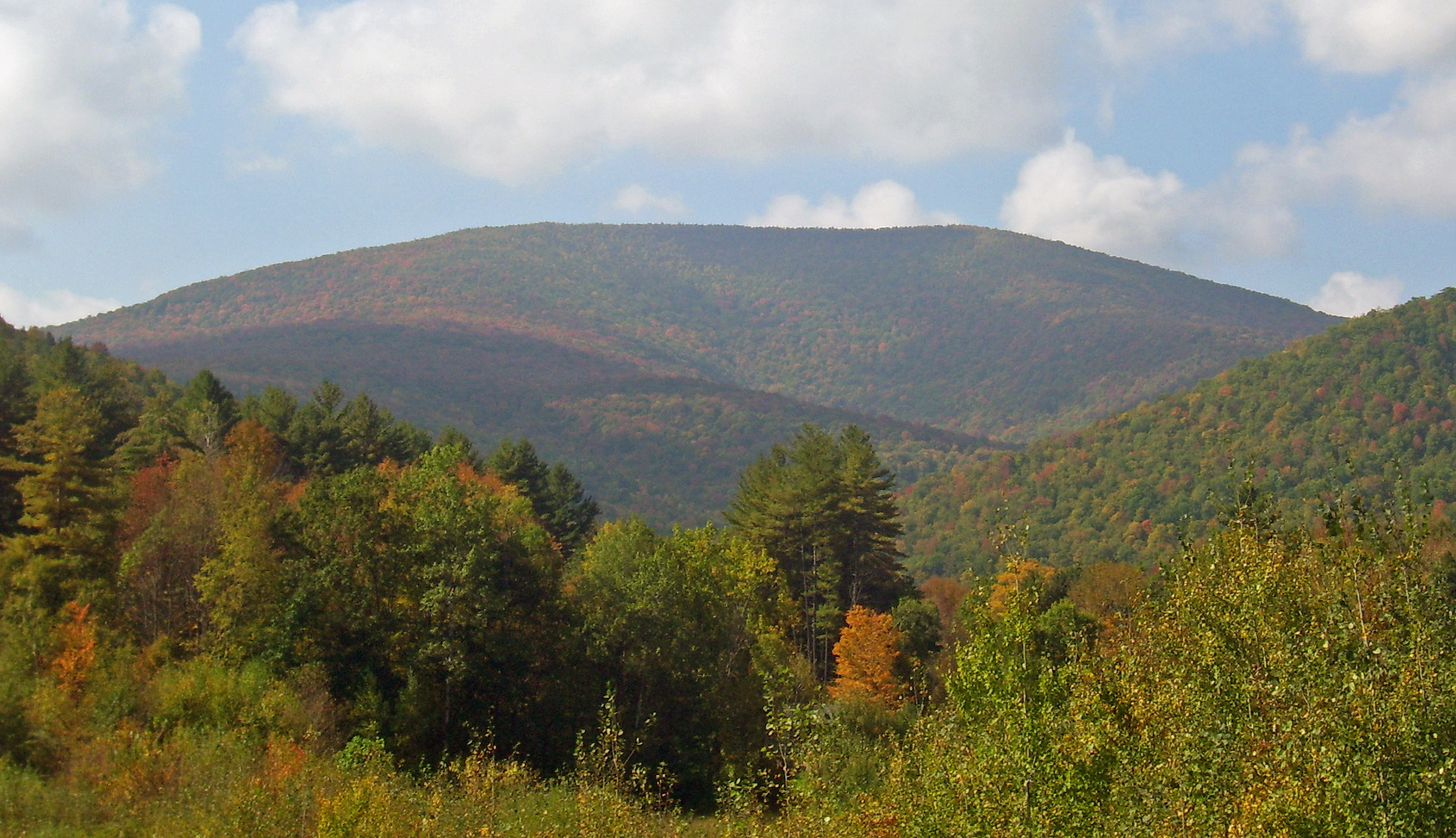
- Balsam seen from Route 28 to the northeast

Highest point
- Elevation: 3,610 ft (1,100 m)
- Prominence: 580 ft (180 m)
- Listing: Catskill High Peaks #28
- Coordinates: 42°5.45′N 74°29.28′W

Geography
- Location within New York Location within the United States
- Location: Oliverea, New York, U.S.
- Parent range: Catskill Mountains
- Topo map(s): USGS Shandaken, Seager

Geology
- Rock age: 250–350 mya
- Mountain type: Dissected plateau

Climbing
- Easiest route: Trail

Balsam Mountain is one of the High Peaks of the Catskill Mountains in the U.S. state of New York. Its exact height has not been determined, so the highest contour line, 3,600 feet (1,100 m), is usually given as its elevation. It is located in western Ulster County, on the divide between the Hudson and Delaware watersheds. The summit and western slopes of the peak are within the Town of Hardenburgh and its eastern slopes are in Shandaken. The small community of Oliverea is near its base on that side. Most of the mountain is publicly owned, managed by the New York State Department of Environmental Conservation as part of the state Forest Preserve, part of the Big Indian-Beaverkill Range Wilderness Area in the Catskill Park. The summit is on a small corner of private land.

As one of the High Peaks it is a popular destination for hikers, especially peakbaggers seeking membership in the Catskill Mountain 3500 Club, since along with Slide, Panther and Blackhead it is one of four peaks that members must climb twice, at least once in winter. The Pine Hill-West Branch Trail (PHWB) crosses its summit; hikers usually approach from either side via the Oliverea-Mapledale Trail, which intersects the PHWB south of the summit, and make the ascent from there. The northwestern approach makes a loop route possible via the Mine Hollow Trail; the southeastern ascent, from McKenley Hollow, has the steepest stretch of trail on any ascent of a Catskill High Peak.

== Geography ==
Balsam Mountain is one of several peaks on an officially unnamed range that carries the watershed divide to Winnisook Lake near Slide Mountain. It is the second northernmost peak on the range after Belleayre Mountain, and the northernmost to exceed 3,500 feet (1,100 m), the threshold for inclusion as a High Peak. A ridge almost two miles (3.2 km) in length separates it and Belleayre. South of Balsam the ridge turns to the southwest, connecting it to 3,420-foot (1,040 m) Haynes Mountain after a mile (1.6 km). The summit, a small bump, is at the south end of a narrow ridge 2,000 feet (610 m) in length with a slight dip between it and the false summit on the northern end.

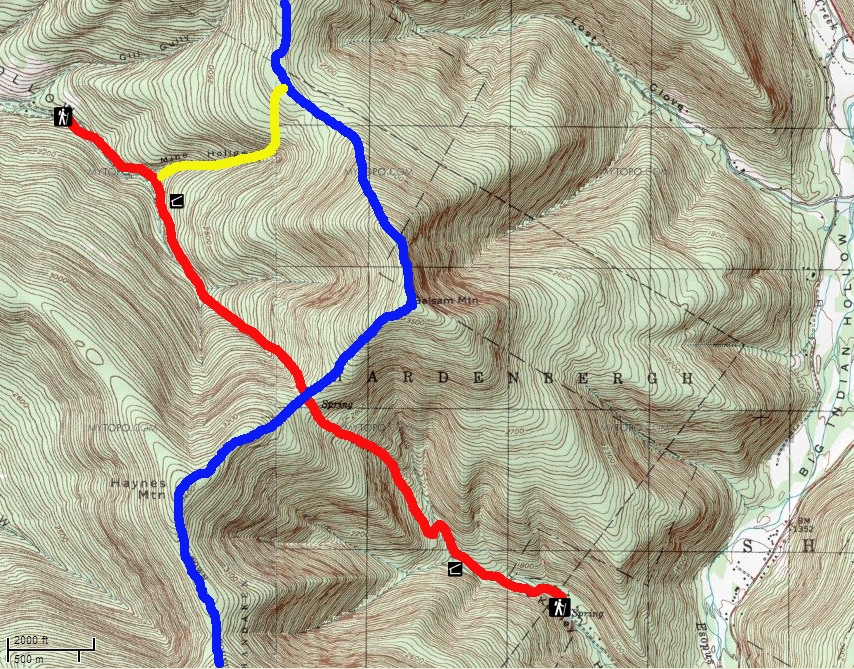
Map of Balsam Mountain, with trails indicated in blaze colors

On its east the slopes drop generally steeply down to Big Indian Hollow, the valley of the headwaters of Esopus Creek, around 1,200 feet (370 m) above sea level. There some more gently sloped areas at mid-mountain level, around 2,200 to 2,700 feet (670 to 820 m), on the southeast side. Tributaries and subtributaries of the Esopus drain even steeper valleys radiating out in a fan-shaped pattern from Lost Clove at the northeast to McKenley (also McKinley) Hollow in the southeast.

The valleys on the west side are also steep but not as numerous, and converge at a higher elevation, 2,100 feet (640 m) than the base on the eastern side. A narrow valley carries the combined streams down to Dry Brook, a tributary of the East Branch of the Delaware River. The northernmost valley, Mine Hollow, is the only one with an official name, the result of a failed attempt to mine gold believed to be in the area. The larger valley it forks off from is known informally as Rider Hollow.

== Geology ==
Like the Catskills as a whole, a dissected plateau, Balsam was formed not through the uplift of rock layers but by the gradual erosion of stream valleys in an uplifted region about 350 mya. Its rock layers and bedrock are primarily Devonian and Silurian shale and sandstone. Later glaciation, primarily the Illinois and Wisconsin periods, shaped the slopes of the mountain, making them even steeper and gradually forming Esopus Creek from its meltwater.

The steeper slopes and deeper valley on the east side reflect the unusual orogeny of the Esopus and Panther Mountain to the east. The rocks of the stream are fractured and faulted much more than elsewhere in the Catskills, and it and its tributary Woodland Creek make an almost complete circle around the mountain, a rosette pattern similarly unusual in the region. Yngvar Isachsen of the New York State Geological Survey has found evidence strongly suggesting that the entire Panther Mountain region is the inverse form of a crater that formed after an ancient meteor impact when the Catskills were a river delta at the northeastern corner of the inland sea that is now the Allegheny Plateau. The rims of the crater wall were thus more prone to erosion and created a deeper valley for the eventual headwaters of the Esopus.

== Flora and fauna ==
Balsam's slopes are covered with typical forestation for their elevations in the Catskills. Northern hardwoods, primarily beech, birch and maple species, predominate, with some occasional cherry and mountain ash. Southern species such as oaks, isolated American chestnuts that survived the blight, shagbark hickory and dogwoods are located close to streams near the base. The northern hardwood species become more stunted and dwarfed at higher elevations, more so on the ridges. On the mountain's summit, boreal species such as balsam fir and red spruce make an appearance, forming some small stands but not a continuous cover as is seen on higher peaks in the range. Around 1970, Catskill forest historian Michael Kudish found the few remaining trees in a fir stand at 3,150 feet (960 m) on the north slope; these have since all died due to heavy deer browse. A large stand of tall hemlock is located in Mine Hollow around 2,400 feet (730 m).

Most of the upper forest remains in first growth, having never been logged or otherwise exploited. Kudish puts the average lower boundary of this area at around 2,300 feet (700 m). The sole exception is 2,940 feet (900 m) on the north slope, where the absence old sugar maples and the presence of white ash are signs that a small area along the ridgeline was logged at some point in the past.

The mountain's forests support a diverse ecosystem of typical Catskill species. Black bear and white-tailed deer, both favorites of hunters, are the largest omnivores and herbivore mammalian species. Smaller mammals, mainly rodent species like porcupines and chipmunks are joined by salamanders and toads.

== History ==
The Iroquois tribes who first settled the Hudson Valley rarely went high into the mountains except to hunt. The earliest human settlements, by the descendants of Dutch and English colonists, near the mountain date to 1805. Small farms were established on the mountain's lower slopes; as late as 1900 the U.S. Geological Survey quadrangle maps of the area show a road going up the ridge between Lost Clove and McKenley Hollow to a structure called Platt's Cabin just below 2,500 feet (760 m). It was exceptionally high; most other farmland on that side went no higher than 1,800 feet (550 m). A 1910 photograph shows a small farm in the head of Rider Hollow on the west.

Balsam's slopes were originally more abundant in hemlock than they are now. Most were harvested by tanners for the tannin in their bark. Roads built to reach hemlock stands survive in McKenley Hollow as high as 2,360 feet (720 m). The Mine Hollow stand is located at the end of another one on the west side.

In 1885, political machinations by the Ulster County delegation to the state legislature led to the Catskill counties being included in the newly created Forest Preserve along with the Adirondacks. Tax-delinquent lands, many of them abandoned by loggers and tanners who had taken all the harvestable timber, which had become the county's by default were transferred to the state as a way of settling the county's outstanding property tax obligations to the state. They were to remain "forever wild", with no timber being harvested again from them. In 1894, a more strongly worded version of the law was incorporated into the state constitution as Article 14.

Under these provisions, the state bought most of the land it currently owns on Balsam, about three-quarters of the mountain, in 1918. By 1931 the trail that had been built up Belleayre for tourists to reach its lookout tower had been extended over Balsam and was marked as a state-maintained trail on maps. The other two trails had been built by that time as well, the Oliverea-Mapledale trail possibly following an old cattle-herding route over the ridge. A few years later, the pairs of lean-tos in McKenley and Rider hollows were built.

The large tract of state land on the range west of Esopus Creek and extending south toward the Beaver Kill Range was designated a wilderness area in the 1980s following a recommendation made in the first Catskill Park State Land Master Plan. This committed the state Department of Environmental Conservation (DEC) to manage the land with the goal of minimizing human impact as much as possible. Accordingly, the lower of the two McKenley Hollow lean-tos was removed as it had become a site for parties due to its proximity to the trailhead and parking lot on that side. The lower Rider Hollow lean-to burned in 1995 and was likewise not replaced.

== Access ==
Hikers usually approach Balsam from the south, by climbing the Oliverea-Mapledale Trail from either hollow to the PH-WB junction at 3,030 feet (920 m) and then going up the summit from there. The eastern approach, from McKenley Hollow, is more frequently used as it is more convenient to NY 28, the main state highway through the central Catskills. The western approach, from Rider Hollow, is more distant from main roads but regarded as more scenic. It can be combined with the Mine Hollow Trail to make a loop route.

The McKenley Hollow approach begins at the parking lot 1 mile (1.6 km) west of County Route 47 in Oliverea, 1,600 feet (490 m) above sea level, where state land begins on the south side of the brook that drains the hollow. The Oliverea-Mapledale Trail follows red plastic markers along the brook past the trail register and the former site of the first lean-to, then the second, in its first, climbing gently. It follows a wood road and begins to climb a little more, still paralleling the brook although higher above it, for the next 0.6 mile (1 km).

A series of stone steps in the trail here begin a section that climbs over 450 feet (140 m) in the next 0.25 mile (400 m). This 35% grade is the steepest section of trail in the Catskills. At the top it levels off and reaches the trail junction.

On the Rider Hollow side, the trailhead at the end of Rider Hollow Road is at a higher elevation, 2,000 feet (610 m). Its first mile remains relatively level as it follows the brook on that side closely, passing the lean-to site on that side and a developed spring. The Mine Hollow Trail's yellow markers fork off to the left 0.4 miles (640 m) from the parking lot. Almost a mile later, the trail crosses another tributary and begins to climb steeply, ascending 750 feet (230 m) in the next 0.8 miles (1.3 km). After passing another spring below a rock ledge, the trail levels out and reaches the junction.

From the junction, the blue-blazed Pine Hill-West Branch Trail ascends the final 570 feet (170 m) moderately up the 0.75 miles (1.21 km) to the summit. Just below the summit a sign at 3,500 feet (1,100 m) advises hikers of special DEC regulations allowing camping above that elevation only in wintertime, and prohibiting open fires. Shortly afterwards it crosses a corner of the large private holding that goes down to Lost Clove. The mountain's actual height of land is a small mound less than 100 feet (30 m) northeast of the trail, in open forest. The total ascent and mileage is 2,000 feet (610 m) and 2.15 miles (3.46 km) from McKenley Hollow, 1,600 feet (490 m) and 1.95 miles (3.14 km) from Rider Hollow.

After the summit the trail drops down slightly again. In the saddle between the two summits a small ledge allows for views to the northwest over the hamlet of Big Indian with West Kill, Hunter and Plateau mountains, all High Peaks, beyond. It is the only view available from the mountain when the leaves are up.

Hikers from Rider Hollow taking the Mine Hollow loop continue over the lower northern summit to where the trail begins a 700-foot (210 m) descent through a rock cut down the north slope of Balsam to the Mine Hollow Trail junction, 1.3 miles (2.1 km) north of the true summit. That trail descends at first steeply through more rock outcrops and then levels off in a hemlock grove. A mile (1.6 km) from the junction it reaches the Oliverea-Mapledale Trail. The loop's total length is 5.2 miles (8.4 km).

Backpackers doing overnight trips along the Pine Hill-West Branch Trail also climb the peak. From the northern end in Pine Hill, it is 4.3 miles (6.9 km) over the southern summit of Belleayre Mountain. The southern terminus of the trail is near Frost Valley YMCA along County Route 47, 9.9 miles (15.9 km) away, and entails climbing Big Indian, Eagle and Haynes mountains before Balsam.

== See also ==
- Geography of New York
- List of mountains in New York
