= French Woods Festival of the Performing Arts =

Coordinates: 41.917112°N 75.184400°W

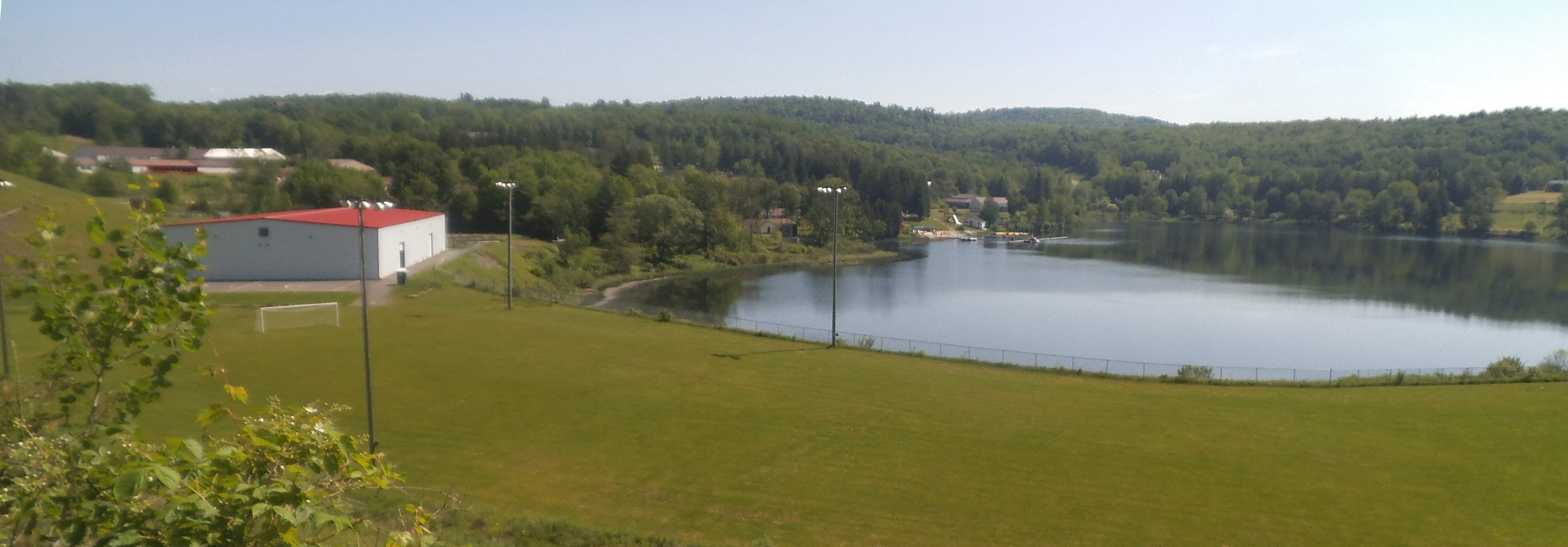
- A wide view of the site and its grounds in 2013
- 199 Bouchoux Brook Road, Hancock, New York 13783

Information
- Type: Private summer camp
- Established: 1970
- Founder: Ron Schaefer
- Director: Ron Schaefer, Beth Schaefer
- Gender: Co-educational
- Age range: 7-17
- Campus size: 170 acres (68 ha)
- Campus type: Rural
- Affiliation: ACA
- Sister Campus: French Woods Sports & Arts Center
- Website: frenchwoods.com

French Woods Festival of the Performing Arts (or simply French Woods Festival or French Woods), is a private, co-educational performing and visual arts camp for youth aged 7 to 17 located in Hancock, New York. Established in 1970, French Woods is among the most prestigious summer arts programs in the United States.

French Woods Festival runs one of the longest summer programs in American camping, running four three-week sessions, one week-long mini-session, and sponsoring a week-long adult camp at its sister camp, French Woods Sports and Arts Center. The primary summer schedule (the first four sessions) itself is among the longest in camping, ending in the last week of August. Campers are not required to attend for the entire summer and are able to choose any arrangement of the four sessions they wish to attend.

French Woods Festival has prepared generations of prominent alumni in arts and culture, particularly in the performing arts. Alumni have either won or been nominated for a total of 40 Billboard Awards, 29 Emmy Awards, 26 Tony Awards, 22 Drama Desk Awards, 18 Grammy Awards, 7 Golden Globe Awards, 6 People's Choice Awards, 4 BRIT Awards, and others.

In recent years, French Woods has premiered several amateur productions of Broadway shows, including Billy Elliot and Honeymoon in Vegas.

== Program Overview ==
French Woods runs four, three-week sessions (e.g. First Session, Second Session, etc.) from early June to late August. An additional one-week session immediately follows Fourth Session. The program incorporates major-minor scheduling. The daily schedule revolves around three majors and three minors, beginning at 9:30 am and ending at 5:45 pm. French Woods offers nearly 400 individual majors and minors each session, stemming from over a dozen departments.

The camp produces a series of shows each session, which were described by Broadway World as having "full production values, including sets, lighting, sound, costumes and live orchestras". Each camper may work on a number of shows per session, and any auditioning for a musical are guaranteed a slot of some kind on the production.

The camp and its activities are divided into three aged camps: Lower Camp (7–11 years), Middle Camp (11–14 years), and Upper Camp (14–17 years).

Each September, French Woods sponsors the French Woods Classic Band Festival, an adult band camp hosted by its sister camp, French Woods Sports & Arts Center.

French Woods administers the Hancock-French Woods Arts Alliance, a 501(c)3 nonprofit that primarily provides financial scholarships to a selected group of staff pursuing education in the arts.

== Location & Facilities ==
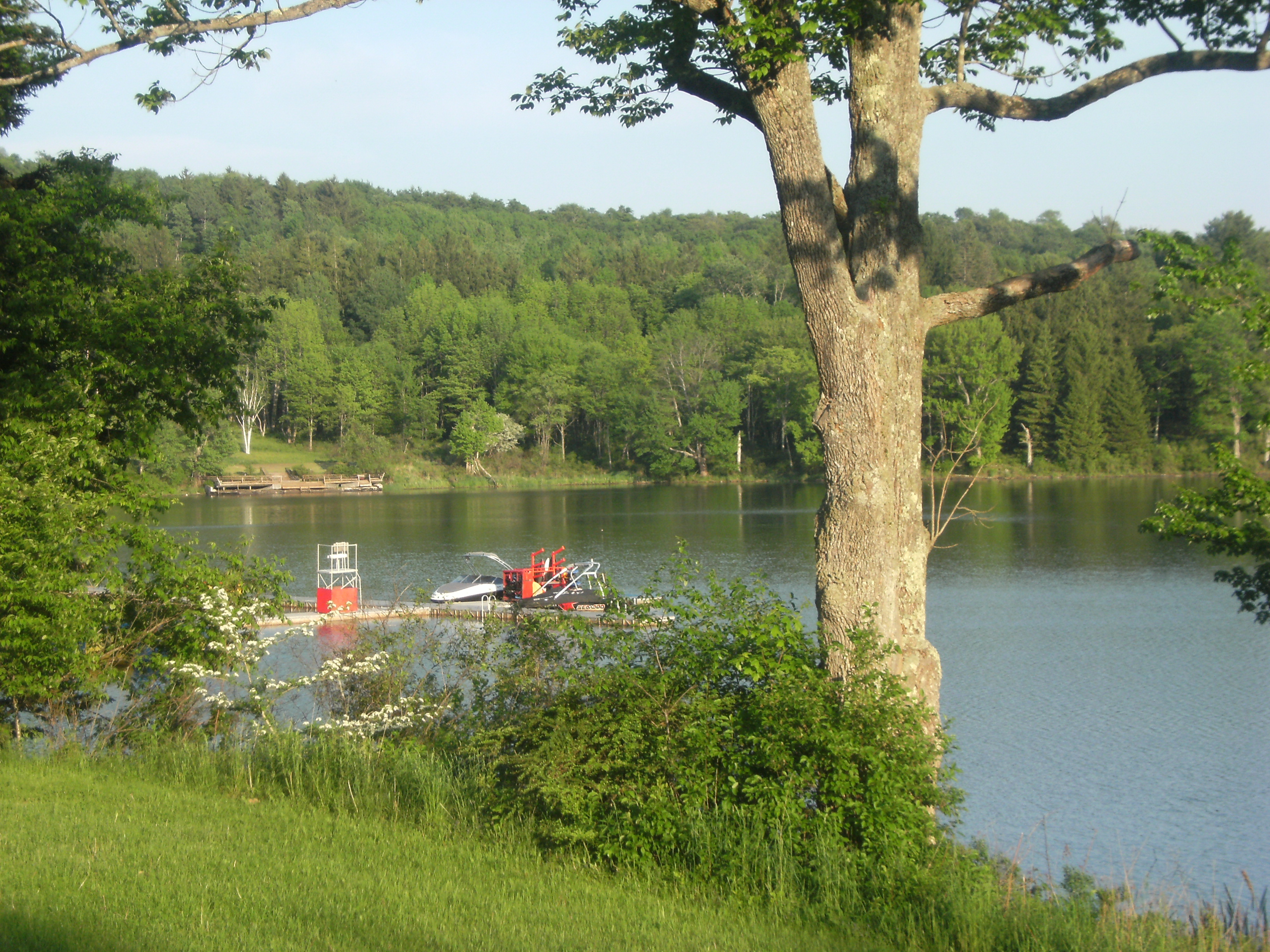
The boating lake at French Woods in 2013

French Woods Festival of the Performing Arts is situated on a small lake in the town of Hancock, New York, roughly two and a half hours from New York City and three hours from Philadelphia. The camp is situated in the western Catskill Mountains near the convergence of that region and New York's Southern Tier. The Delaware River (and thus, the New York-Pennsylvania border) is about 6 miles south and west of French Woods. The camp's name is derived from the hamlet of French Woods where it resides. It is approximately 170 acres (68 hectares).

French Woods is home to five theaters, two circus pavilions, two music centers, two visual arts complexes, a costumes building, dance center, culinary shed, and a collection of fitness facilities including eleven outdoor tennis courts, an indoor skatepark, hilltop challenge course, equestrian stables, sports complex consisting of a gymnasium and sport-specific fields/courts, fitness center, and pool.

The property also has two administrative buildings, a dining hall, wellness center, camp store, and a canteen.

== Notable alumni ==
- Steve Augeri, former lead vocalist, Journey
- Doug Besterman, Tony Award-winning orchestrator
- Jason Robert Brown, Tony Award-winning composer and lyricist
- Andréa Burns, actress
- Jesse Carmichael, keyboardist, Maroon 5
- Aiden Curtiss, model
- Daniel Delaney, restaurateur
- Zooey Deschanel, actress
- Max Ehrich, actor
- Melissa Errico, actress
- Jon Favreau, actor
- Barrett Foa, actor
- Gideon Glick, actor
- Ilan Hall, restaurateur
- David Javerbaum, Executive Producer, The Daily Show with Jon Stewart
- Adam Kantor, actor and singer
- Cameron Kasky, activist
- Adam Levine, lead singer, Maroon 5
- Natasha Lyonne, actress
- Tito Muñoz, music director, The Phoenix Symphony
- Benj Pasek, Tony Award winning composer and lyricist
- David Pogue, contributor, The New York Times
- Zac Posen, fashion designer
- Elena Satine, actress
- Dan Schneider, Emmy-winning television producer
- Max Schneider, singer-songwriter and actor
- David Sheinkopf, actor
- Iliza Shlesinger, stand-up comedian
- Howard Stelzer, composer and owner of Intransitive Recordings
- David Stone, musical theater producer
- Olivia Thirlby, actress
- Jed Whedon, screenwriter and musician
- Nat Wolff, singer-songwriter
- Jason Wise, choreographer
- Harris Wulfson, composer and violinist
- Remy Zaken, actress
- Andrew Wotman, record producer/songwriter

== In popular culture ==
- Camp'd Out: I'm Going to Performing Arts Camp is a documentary television movie in the MTV True Life series that was filmed in the summer of 2008 and first shown on April 25, 2009. The film follows three aspiring Broadway stars through nine weeks of competitive drama at French Woods.
