= Nmperign =

American jazz group

nmperign
- Origin: Boston, Massachusetts
- Genres: Free improvisation, experimental music, free jazz
- Years active: 1998 – present
- Labels: Twisted Village, Intransitive, Selektion, Siwa
- Members: Bhob Rainey; Greg Kelley
- Past members: Tatsuya Nakatani

Nmperign is an experimental improvisational jazz group formed in Boston, Massachusetts in 1998.

== Early history ==
The idea for the group came when soprano saxophonist Bhob Rainey decided to embark upon an ambitious cross-country tour, choosing trumpeter Greg Kelley and percussionist Tatsuya Nakatani as his travelmates. The three, who had been playing together in various groups for a number of months prior (most notably with multi-instrumentalist Masashi Harada), then began rehearsing regularly as a trio and recorded their first album at Studio 7A West in Charlestown, Massachusetts that summer. The album was released as 44'38"/5 by the Twisted Village label and the group began their 6-week cross-country tour in November of that year. 2 weeks into the tour nmperign became a duo, with Nakatani departing for personal reasons.

Releasing an album of quiet abstract improvisations on a psych label and touring across the country garnered the group some attention. And despite Rainey's move to Chicago in 1999, the group remained very active that year, beginning their ongoing collaboration with electronic musician Jason Lescalleet, travelling out to the West Coast for a number of concerts and making a 7-week cross-country tour later that fall. All of this activity resulted in the release of This is nmperign's 2nd CD on Twisted Village (which featured the group's last performance with Nakatani and their first performance with Lescalleet) and the collaborative CD In Which The Silent Partner-Director Is No Longer Able To Make His Point To The Industrial Dreamer with Jason Lescalleet on Intransitive Recordings.

By the year 2000, Rainey was back in Boston and the group embarked on their first tour of Europe. It was at this time that the group began its relationships with a number of European improvisers including Axel Dörner and Andrea Neumann, with whom the duo would embark on a 4-week United States tour in September 2001.

Over the next few years, nmperign continued to travel the United States and Europe, including tours on both continents with percussionist Le Quan Ninh and dancer Yukiko Nakamura, an inexplicable pairing with noise provocateur Emil Beaulieau (including some collaborations which came to be known as nmpeRRRon), and collaborations with Jerome Noetinger & Lionel Marchetti, and Gunter Müller.

== The BSC ==
The BSC was formed in 2000 by Bhob Rainey as a way to explore the dynamics of large group improvisation. The group also includes his nmperign partner Greg Kelley on trumpet, Mike Bullock on double bass, James Coleman on theremin, Chris Cooper on prepared guitar, Vic Rawlings on cello & electronics, Howard Stelzer on tapes, and Liz Tonne on voice. The group has released one CD on Grob entitled Good (2003) and has collaborated a number of times with pianist Steve Drury and his Callithumpian Consort (performing graphic scores by Stockhausen, Cardew and Christian Wolff), as well as with composer Christian Wolff in a realization of his graphic score, Edges. In 2010, the group released 23% Bicycle and/or Ribbons of the Natural Order, a download-only release which was made available by posting a tweet or "liking" it on Facebook.

== Damon and Naomi ==
In 2004, Damon and Naomi, via their mutual friends at Twisted Village, invited nmperign to play on a bill with them and subsequently to play on their new album, which would be the first on their own 20|20|20 label. Rainey and Kelley appeared on a number of tracks on their 2005 album The Earth is Blue and also began performing live with the duo and guitarist Michio Kurihara. Rainey became a touring member of the group and has performed with them throughout the United States, Europe and Japan. Both Kelley and Rainey have appeared on subsequent recordings with Rainey handling all the string and horn arrangements on their 2007 album Within These Walls.

== Salt Peanuts ==
A seeming anomaly in the discography of nmperign is the 2003 CDr release Salt Peanuts released on American Tapes. Released in an edition of 80, the recording showcases 12 maniacal takes of the "head" section of the title standard as well 12 takes of the "head" of Donna Lee. Apparently the result of some good-natured heckling by John Olson and Aaron Dilloway of Wolf Eyes at the 2003 De Stijl/Freedom From Festival in Minneapolis, the recording showcases nmperign's sense of humor and conceptual rigorousness.

== Points of reference ==
Despite the fact that the title of their first album was not a reference to John Cage (but simply the total time of the album divided by the number of tracks), nmperign has used a number of literary and other references in their titles, ranging from Marguerite Duras' The Malady of Death and Four Novels, Georges Bataille's Poems, Zen Master Eihei Dogen, a book of interviews with Jean-Luc Godard, Herman Melville's Pierre; Or, the Ambiguities, a box of Chinese tea, The Doors and micromosaic artist Henry Dalton.

The name nmperign itself is derived from the Latin phrase "igNotuM PER IGNotius," meaning "the unknown through the more unknown."

== 2009 - ==
In 2009, Rainey moved out of Boston to New Orleans. This move was ironically timed with a renewed spate of activity from the band with the release of Ommatidia (their first duo recording since 2004's double LP We Devote Every Effort To Offer You The Best That You Deserve To Have For Your Enjoyment) on Intransitive Recordings and a 1-sided collaborative LP with percussionist Jake Meginsky on Rel Records entitled Selected Occasions of Handsome Deceit. The group's only performance as nmperign since Rainey's move was at the 2010 Neon Marshmallow Festival in Chicago, as a trio with Jason Lescalleet. Further concerts with Lescalleet are planned for 2011.

== Members ==
=== Current ===
- Bhob Rainey – soprano saxophone (1998–present)
- Greg Kelley – trumpet (1998–present)

=== Adjunct ===
- Jason Lescalleet – tape loops, electronics (1999–present)
- Jake Meginsky – percussion (2008–present)
- Le Quan Ninh – percussion (2002–present)
- Yukiko Nakamura – dance (2002–present)

=== Former ===
- Tatsuya Nakatani – percussion (1998)

== Festival appearances ==
- Autumn Uprising Festival, Cambridge Massachusetts 1999
- East Bay Creative Music Festival, Oakland California 1999
- Festival Densités, Verdun France 2001
- Superfici Sonore, Florence Italy 2001
- Improvised and Otherwise Festival, Brooklyn New York 2002
- Fruits De Mhere, Mhere France 2002
- Festival des Musiques Innovatrices, St. Etienne France 2002
- Musique Action, Nancy France 2002, 2004
- AMPLIFY New York New York 2003
- The De Stijl/Freedom From Festival, Minneapolis Minnesota 2003
- No Fun Fest, New York New York 2004
- Erstquake 2, New York New York 2005
- Music Lovers' Field Companion, Gateshead England 2005
- The End Times Festival, Minneapolis Minnesota 2006
- Instal, Glasgow Scotland 2006
- Courtisane Festival, Ghent Belgium 2007
- Brainwaves 2008, Arlington Massachusetts 2008
- Neon Marshmallow Festival, Chicago Illinois 2010

== Discography ==
44′38″/5 CD (Twisted Village, US) 1998

Recycled cassette (RRRecords, US) 1999

This Is Nmperign’s Second CD CD (Twisted Village, US) 1999

In Which The Silent Partner-Director Can No Longer Make His Point To The Industrial Dreamer CD w/ Jason Lescalleet (Intransitive Recordings, US) 1999

Bhob Rainey/Greg Kelley: nmperign CD (Selektion, Germany) 2001

Nmperign + Dörner, Beins LP (Twisted Village, US) 2002

More Gloom, More Light CD w/ Günter Müller (Rossbin, Italy) 2003

Salt Peanuts CDr (American Tapes, US) 2003

We Devote Every Effort To Offer You The Best That You Deserve To Have For Your Enjoyment 2LP (Siwa, US) 2004

Thanks, Cash CD w/ Axel Dörner & Andrea Neumann (Sedimental, US) 2004

Love Me Two Times 2CD w/ Jason Lescalleet (Intransitive Recordings, US) 2006

Marvin/Live 1978 Split 7″ w/ Skeletons Out (Absurd, Greece) 2009

Ommatidia CD (Intransitive Recordings, US) 2009

Selected Occasions of Handsome Deceit 1-sided LP w/ Jake Meginsky (Rel Records, US) 2010

with The BSC

Good CD (Grob, Germany) 2003

23% Bicycle and/or Ribbons of the Natural Order download-only 2010

with Damon & Naomi

The Earth is Blue CD, LP (20|20|20)

Within These Walls CD (20|20|20)

== Sources ==
- Todd S. Jenkins: Free Jazz and Free Improvisation, Vol. 1, 2; Greenwood Press, 2004; ISBN 978-0-313-33313-2, ISBN 978-0-313-33314-9
- Aden Evens: Sound Ideas: Music, Machines, and Experience (Theory Out Of Bounds); Univ Of Minnesota Press, 2005; ISBN 978-0-8166-4536-7
- Brian Marley, Mark Wastell: Blocks of Consciousness and the Unbroken Continuum; Sound 323, 2005; ISBN 978-0-9551541-0-2
- Richard Cook, Brian Morton: The Penguin Guide to Jazz Recordings: Ninth Edition; Penguin (Non-Classics), 2008; ISBN 978-0-14-103401-0
