= Balsam Mountain =

Balsam Mountain may refer to:

- Balsam Mountain (Ulster County, New York) in the Catskills
- Balsam Mountain (Greene County, New York) in the Catskills
- Balsam Lake Mountain in the Catskills in New York
- Balsam Cap in the Catskills in New York
- Great Balsam Mountains off the Blue Ridge Parkway in North Carolina
