= Beequeen =

Dutch experimental rock musical group

- Origin: Nijmegen, Netherlands
- Genres: Experimental rock
- Years active: 1988–present
- Labels: Plinkity Plonk Records; Korm Plastics
- Members: Frans de Waard; Freek Kinkelaar; Olga Wallis
- Website: beequeen.nl

Beequeen is an experimental rock group formed in 1988 in Nijmegen, the Netherlands. Initially a duo of Frans de Waard and Freek Kinkelaar (both on vocals, keyboards and electronics), they were joined in 2007 by Olga Wallis, also on vocals and keyboards. They have released over 20 albums on different labels around the world.

== Formation ==
In the summer of 1988, de Waard and Kinkelaar recorded and released their first album as Beequeen, a cassette entitled Mappa Mundi released on De Waard’s Korm Plastics label. A review at Chain D.L.K. stated this album had a "...lovely psychotic calmness." The name Beequeen originated from an admiration of the works of German conceptual artist Joseph Beuys. The name is an adaptation of Beuys’ 1956 work Bienenkönigin (German for queen bee).

== Career ==
Between 1988 and 2002, Beequeen’s musical style may be described as experimental ambient-drone music. A collection of their songs spanning several years can be found on their album A Touch of Brimstone that included writings from fans and their webmaster, who at the time ran the Pretentious.network.

In 2002, their musical pallet widened when Beequeen began to incorporate songs into their music, mixing experiment with dreampop music on their album Ownliness.

Beequeen's drone side continued in expression. In 2003, Gund had "Tapestries of sound slowly evolve and unravel their inner beauty" according to a review in Vital Weekly.

Pitchfork Magazine found that The Bodyshop, an album released two years later "...is Beequeen's most musically expansive work yet" with subtle trip-hop beats replacing drones on previous albums. This album was recorded by the guitarist from The Legendary Pink Dots, Erik Drost.

=== Plinkity Plonk Records ===
In 1999, Beequeen released a double LP box set featuring live performances as the first release on their private label Plinkity Plonk records. Over the years, the label would release music by, amongst others, De Fabriek, Mirror, Edward Ka-spel, Legendary Pink Dots, Paul Panhuysen and The Hafler Trio.

=== International tours ===
Beequeen has played live in The Netherlands, Belgium, Germany and Poland. In 2003, Beequeen toured the American east coast with Andrew Liles. The tour was organized by their record label Important records. Beequeen performed several shows in Russia in 2011, and also appeared on Dutch national radio and regional television, VPRO.

=== Olga Wallis joins ===
In 2007, vocalist Olga Wallis joined Beequeen on the album Sandancing. Another appearance of an alumnus from the Legendary Pink Dots, Barry Gray, lends guitar to this album. A Tiny Mix Tapes review found aspects of this album "much closer to the work Julee Cruise did with Angelo Badalamenti in the late ’80s."

Of the 2011 album, Port Out Starboard Home, Record Collector said "it’s wondrous how the dreamy vocal recordings...are interspaced with experimental ambient textures." The final track on this album even used the sound of lambs bleating.

2014’s album Around Midnight was produced by Mekanik Kommando and Use of Ashes-member Peter van Vliet. The album was followed by the single Sturmwind/Gilbert on Tonefloat records.

=== Hiatus and Winter ===
From 2015 to 2020, Beequeen was inactive. In 2020, De Waard and Kinkelaar released a new Beequeen album entitled Winter. The album was created from previous unreleased archive recordings and new recordings made in winter 2020. A review at Spectrum Culture found this album "...highly enjoyable uneasy listening."

== Other Bands and Publishing ==
De Waard and Kinkelaar continued to record instrumental ambient-drone music under the name Wander. As Wander they recorded several albums and singles, each one entitled Wander.

Freek Kinkelaar has also been active with various solo projects including Brunnen, which Inverted Audio reviewed The Garden of Perpetual Dreams as "One minute you're wandering through dark, psychedelic gloom, the next stumbling across an infinitely serene, sun-dappled glade..." and another Brunnen album as "...“bedroom pop” if it was more poppish — quiet songs sparsely implemented, with breathy vocals and occasional noisy (but not loud) touches," in a review at Expose Online. He currently plays in The Blue Mask, and Frans de Waard has been active under various guises such as Kapotte Muziek, Goem, Shifts and Quest. He also publishes Vital Weekly, an online newsletter featuring reviews on experimental music. He also ran another, longer running record label, Korm Plastics, that released an extensive number of bands like Merzbow, Arcane Device, Asmus Tietchens, and Zev, plus self-released recordings. In 2015 Korm Plastics stopped releasing music. As of 2020, Korm Plastics began publishing books.

== Album discography ==
- Mappa Mundi (1989)
- Scala Destillans (split album with Technological Aquiver) (1990)
- Fond (1991)
- Der Holzweg (1993)
- Time Waits for No One (1994)
- Sugarbush (1995)
- Music for the Head Ballet (1996)
- Split (split album with Kapotte Muziek) (1997)
- Stetson (1997)
- The Surrough Gate (1997)
- Do Be Do (1999)
- Treatise (2000)
- Natursymfonie (2002)
- Ownliness (2002)
- A Touch of Brimstone (2002)
- Gund (2003)
- Aughton – The Patient Books (2004)
- The Body Shop (2005)
- Seltenturn – B Sides (2007)
- Sandancing (2008)
- Sandancing Demos (2008)
- Port Out Starboard Home (2011)
- Around Midnight (2014)
- Winter (2020)
