= Van Wyck Mountain =

Mountain in New York, United States

- Location within New York Location within the United States

Highest point
- Elevation: 3,202 feet (976 m)
- Coordinates: 41°57′08″N 74°26′08″W

Geography
- Location: Frost Valley, New York, U.S.
- Topo map: USGS Peekamoose Mountain

Van Wyck Mountain is a mountain located in the Catskill Mountains of New York east-southeast of Frost Valley. Hemlock Mountain is located north, Woodhull Mountain is located west-southwest, Samson Mountain is located southeast, Bangle Hill is located south, and Wildcat Mountain is located northwest of Van Wyck Mountain.
