= Ash Run =

- Location of the mouth of Ash Run

Location
- Country: United States
- State: New York
- County: Delaware

Physical characteristics
- Source
  - coordinates: 42°03′19″N 75°04′44″W
- Mouth: Trout Brook
  - coordinates: 42°02′48″N 75°03′51″W
  - elevation: 1,096 ft (334 m)

Ash Run is a river in Delaware County, New York. It flows into Trout Brook north-northeast of Shinhopple.
