= Launt Pond =

- Location of Launt Pond within New York
- Location: Delaware County, New York
- Coordinates: 42°07′13″N 75°04′18″W
- Type: Reservoir
- Primary inflows: East Trout Brook
- Primary outflows: East Trout Brook
- Basin countries: United States
- Surface area: 12 acres (4.9 ha)
- Surface elevation: 1,883 ft (574 m)
- Settlements: Shinhopple

Launt Pond is a small reservoir located north of Shinhopple in Delaware County, New York. East Trout Brook flows through Launt Pond.

== See also ==
- List of lakes in New York
