= Sand Pond =

Sand Pond may refer to:

- Sand Pond (Maine), a pond on Hancock Brook in Denmark, Maine
- Sand Pond (New York), a small lake near French Woods, Delaware County
- Sand Pond, Rhode Island, a neighborhood and pond located north of Warwick, Rhode Island
