= Indian Creek (Olympia, Washington) =

Creek in Thurston County, Washington state

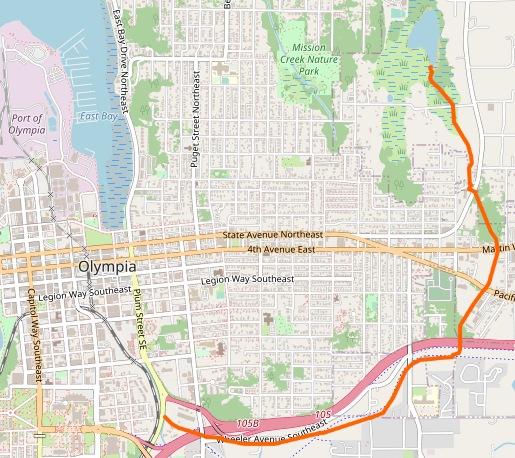
- Flow of Indian Creek in orange next to Olympia, Washington
- Interactive map of Creek location
- Etymology: Indigenous settlements at creek

Location
- Country: United States
- State: Washington
- County: Thurston County

Physical characteristics
- Source: Bigelow Lake
  - coordinates: 47°03′22.3″N 122°52′00.8″W
- Mouth: Moxlie Creek
  - coordinates: 47°02′10.6″N 122°53′24.2″W

Basin features
- Waterbodies: Budd Inlet
- Geographic Names Information System: 1505716

Indian Creek is a stream in Thurston County in the U.S. state of Washington. It is a 3-mile Olympian creek. Its source is a wetland along the northern end of South Bay Road. It enters Budd Inlet at East Bay, having first joined with Moxlie Creek. It can most easily be accessed between Boulevard Road and Frederick Road along the Karen Fraser Woodland Trail. American Indian settlements near the creek's course may account for the name.

Runoff from Interstate-5 is treated at a stormwater facility before entering the creek.

Fecal coliform bacteria have been detected in unsafe levels in the creek.

== See also ==
- List of geographic features in Thurston County, Washington
