= Trout Brook (East Branch Delaware River tributary) =

Location
- Country: United States
- State: New York
- County: Delaware

Physical characteristics
- Source: East Trout Brook
  - location: SE of Walton
  - coordinates: 42°07′45″N 75°04′46″W
- 2nd source: West Trout Brook
  - location: SE of Walton
  - coordinates: 42°07′07″N 75°04′58″W
- Source confluence
  - location: NNE of Shinhopple
  - coordinates: 42°04′17″N 75°03′39″W
  - elevation: 1,283 ft (391 m)
- Mouth: East Branch Delaware River
  - location: Shinhopple
  - coordinates: 42°02′21″N 75°04′04″W
- Basin size: 13.2 mi^{2} (34 km^{2})

Basin features
- Tributaries
  - right: Ash Run, Dry Brook

Trout Brook is a river in Delaware County, New York. It flows into the East Branch Delaware River by Shinhopple.
