= East Trout Brook =

- Location of the mouth of East Trout Brook

Location
- Country: United States
- State: New York
- County: Delaware

Physical characteristics
- Source
  - coordinates: 42°07′45″N 75°04′46″W
- Mouth: Trout Brook
  - coordinates: 42°04′17″N 75°03′39″W
  - elevation: 1,283 ft (391 m)

East Trout Brook is a river in Delaware County, New York. It flows into Trout Brook north-northeast of Shinhopple. It flows through Launt Pond.
