= Trout Brook Mountain =

Mountain in New York, United States

- Location within New York Location within the United States

Highest point
- Elevation: 2,257 feet (688 m)
- Coordinates: 42°04′08″N 75°02′47″W

Geography
- Location: Corbett, New York, U.S.
- Topo map: USGS Corbett

Trout Brook Mountain is a mountain located in the Catskill Mountains of New York west of Corbett, New York.
