= Dry Brook (Corbett, New York) =

- Location of the mouth of Dry Brook

Location
- Country: United States
- State: New York
- County: Delaware

Physical characteristics
- Source
  - coordinates: 42°02′56″N 75°05′12″W
- Mouth: Trout Brook
  - coordinates: 42°02′37″N 75°04′02″W
  - elevation: 1,066 ft (325 m)

Dry Brook is a river in Delaware County, New York. It flows into Trout Brook north-northeast of Shinhopple.
