= Wildcat Mountain (Ulster County, New York) =

Mountain in New York, United States

- Location within New York Location within the United States

Highest point
- Elevation: 3,163 feet (964 m)
- Coordinates: 41°58′39″N 74°28′34″W

Geography
- Location: Frost Valley, New York, U.S.
- Topo map: USGS Peekamoose Mountain

Wildcat Mountain is a mountain located in the Catskill Mountains of New York east-southeast of Frost Valley. Hemlock Mountain is located northeast, Van Wyck Mountain is located southeast, and Fir Mountain is located north of Wildcat Mountain.
