= Panther Mountain (New York) =

Mountain in New York's Catskill range that rose from old meteor crater

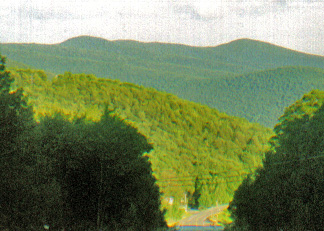
- Panther from the west, along Route 28 near Highmount

Highest point
- Elevation: ~3,720 feet (1,130 m)
- Prominence: 980 feet (300 m)
- Listing: Catskill High Peaks 18th
- Coordinates: 42°03′23″N 74°23′42″W

Geography
- Location within New York Location within the United States
- Location: Shandaken, New York, U.S.
- Parent range: Catskills
- Topo map: USGS Shandaken

Climbing
- Easiest route: Trail

Panther Mountain is one of the Catskill High Peaks, located in the Town of Shandaken in Ulster County, New York. At approximately 3,720 feet (1,130 m) in elevation, it is the 18th highest in the range. A combination of factors has led some geologists to believe the mountain is on the site of an ancient meteorite impact crater.

Its proximity to Slide Mountain, the highest Catskill peak, the relatively short distance required to climb the mountain from the south and the excellent views available from the mountain and nearby Giant Ledge have made Panther one of the most popular hikes in the range. Aspiring members of the Catskill Mountain 3500 Club must climb it twice, at least once during winter.

== Name ==
The origin of the name is unknown. Panthers may once have been seen in the area; but are not resident in the Catskills today.

== Geography ==
The mountain takes the shape of a longitudinal ridge in the center of the rough circle mostly formed by Esopus and Woodland creeks. Slide's north ridge begins right where the Panther/Giant Ledge ridge ends. Two named tributaries of Woodland, its Dougherty Branch and Panther Kill, rise on the mountain's western slopes.

Three of the valleys around the edge of the mountain have earned separate names of their own. Going clockwise from the southwest, they are Little Peck Hollow, Hatchery Hollow and Fox Hollow. The ridge aside the Daugherty Branch is called Fork Ridge.

The mountain rises gradually from the north, with many false summits. The drop to the south, to the col with Giant Ledge, is much sharper.

The entire area has long been a part of New York's Forest Preserve. Today it is within the Slide Mountain Wilderness Area, part of the Catskill Park, managed by the state Department of Environmental Conservation.

== Natural history ==
=== Geology ===
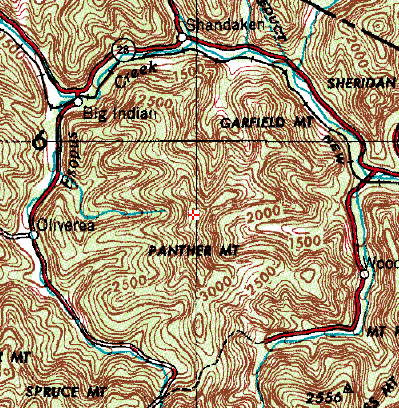
The nearly complete circle made by Esopus and Woodland creeks around Panther gives a rough indication where the crater walls were.

The circular pattern made by the two creeks surrounding Panther Mountain suggest that it might have a different origin from other Catskill peaks. Most mountains' drainage basins show a more dendritic (tree-like) pattern rather than the rosette made by Esopus and Woodland creeks around the mountain.

In the 1940s, geologist George Chadwick noticed this dome structure, and concluded that it might be the result of gas pushing up from below. The Dome Gas Company drilled a 6,000-foot (1,800 m) well into the structure. It produced roughly 50,000 cubic feet (1,400 m^{3}) of natural gas a day, but since that was not profitable, the effort was abandoned.

In the early 1970s, another geologist, Yngvar Isachsen of the New York State Geological Survey at the New York State Museum in Albany, wondered if the stream pattern indicated an impact crater buried beneath the surface. Since it was not his primary task at the Geological Survey, Isachsen did most of his research into the crater question in his own time. He found, when looking at the bed of Esopus Creek, that much of the exposed sandstone and shale showed an unusually closely spaced fracture pattern — every foot (30 cm) instead of every meter (3.3 ft), as is seen elsewhere in the Catskills. He reasoned that if a crater wall lay beneath, the debris from the impact and the sedimentary rock already in the area would have settled more compactly and been more prone to sagging and fracturing over time.

It wasn't until his later years, in the early 1990s, that Isachsen was able to devote more time to the crater question. Since the walls of a newly formed impact crater are often unable to support themselves, landslides occur and build up a mound of rock and soil in the center. This results in a lower density of rock and thus slightly reduced gravitational pull, which can be measured. Isachsen took a gravimeter along on two hikes up the mountain and took regular readings. As he had expected, the gravity in the area was slightly lower than other mountains of comparable elevation in the Catskills, adding more weight to the crater theory.

To prove his hypothesis, Isachsen needed to drill deep into the rock under the mountain and find direct mineral evidence of a meteorite strike, but this was beyond his resources. Then he discovered that drill cuttings from the earlier gas well were archived at the New York State Museum - Geological Survey. These cuttings were examined carefully, during which graduate students working for him found microscopic iron spherules — to him irrefutable evidence of an impact crater.

However, questions from crater specialists at a conference in Budapest sent him back to look more closely at the cuttings. One attendee pointed out that he hadn't ruled out the possibility that the spherules had merely been deposited by a passing meteorite or comet. In October 1999, closer examination of tiny quartz crystals in the samples turned up shock lamellae, which could only have resulted from impact. A group of Canadian specialists confirmed the finding.

The impact is estimated to have occurred 375 million years ago, during the Devonian period, when much of what is now the Catskills was either river delta or a shallow sea. The crater lies 2,640 feet (800 m) below the surface, is 6 miles (9.7 km) wide, and lies directly under the mountain. The meteorite that struck is believed to have been roughly one-half mile (1 km) wide, striking with a force equivalent to 11 trillion tons (9.9 trillion tonnes) of Trinitrotoluene.

Isachsen believes it is possible that there may be significant hydrocarbon deposits, often associated with ancient buried impact craters, very deep beneath the mountain.

In 2004, the European Space Agency's Mars Express probe found an analogous circular plateau in the Solis Planum region of the Thaumasia Planum area of Mars. While it has not yet eroded as Panther has, both are an example of inverted relief.

=== Forests ===
Panther's forests are for the most part typical of the Catskills, with beech-birch-maple northern hardwood forests on its lower slopes giving way to boreal forests of balsam fir and red spruce above 3,500 feet (1,100 m) on the mountain. While the lower slopes were logged in the 19th century, particularly for Eastern hemlock bark and its tannin, the upper mountain remains in first growth. According to Catskill forest historian Michael Kudish, there is a rare virgin spruce grove near the summit. There are also two open areas visible from the summit on a knob known as Beech Flat, one of about 2 acres (0.81 ha) at 2,740 feet (840 m) and another of 5–7 acres (2.0–2.8 ha) at 2,848 feet (868 m), are totally natural, resulting from the absence of soil in those areas.

== Human history ==
It is not known who first climbed Panther, due to the sketchy records kept by early inhabitants of the area. Farming, Kudish found, went much lower on Panther 1,613 feet (492 m) (on average) than it did elsewhere in the Catskills, due to the steep slopes at the mountain's base. Later logging climbed to a higher elevation, particularly near the hamlets of Big Indian and Phoenicia due to nearby train stations (Garfield Mountain's summit does not appear to be in first growth).

The proximity of the railroad led to another common Catskill industry of the time, bluestone quarrying. Kudish has found several along the northern edge of the mountain and suspects there may be more.

The Fox Hollow-Panther-Giant Ledge Trail across the mountain used by hikers to reach the summit today was cut in 1935, based on a contemporary Conservation Department pamphlet. The Fox Hollow Lean-To was built the next year.

== Approaches ==
Panther is traversed by the blue-blazed Fox Hollow-Panther-Giant Ledge Trail (GP), which runs north–south from Fox Hollow down to a junction with the yellow-blazed Phoenicia-East Branch (P-EB) Trail 0.5 miles (0.80 km) south of Giant Ledge. The vast majority of attempts on the mountain use this route.

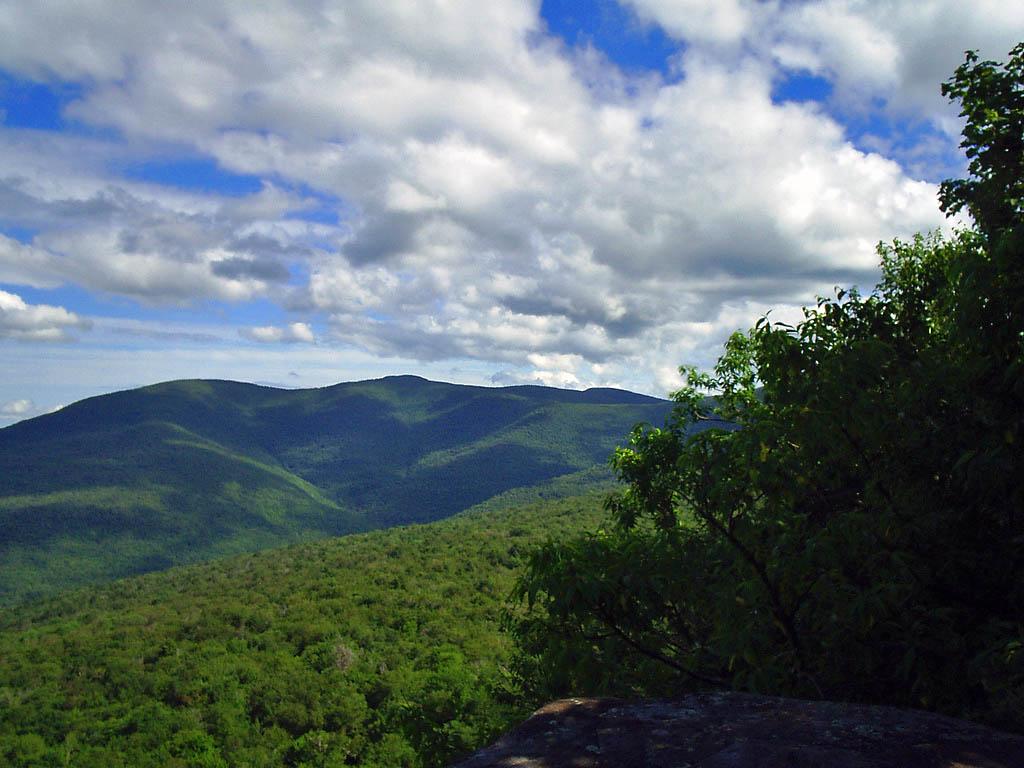
View of Wittenberg and Cornell Mountains from Giant Ledge.

The shorter southern approach is much more popular due not only to its brevity but the excellent views available from Giant Ledge. The northern approach, however, is not without some views of its own. Sometimes the entire 7.5-mile (12.1 km) GP trail, plus the route to the Giant Ledge trailhead or Woodland Valley State Campground, will be hiked as an overnight backpack, with one of the designated campsites along the trail being use, and cars parked at both ends.

=== Southern route ===
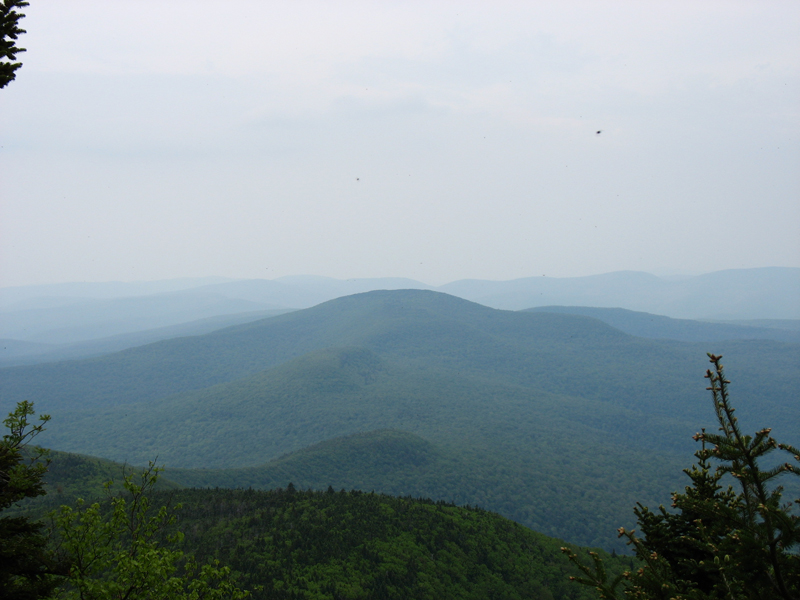
Panther and Giant Ledge from near the summit of Slide

Hikers typically park at the trailhead lot, 2,100 feet (640 m) in elevation, where Ulster County Route 47 bends sharply about three-quarters of a mile (1.3 km) north of Winnisook Lake, midway up or down the hill between it and Big Indian Hollow. Here the P-EB leaves the road again and leads southeast uphill 0.7 miles (1.1 km) and 500 vertical feet (150 m) to the GP in the level area between the ledge and Slide's north ridge. The former route of the P-EB, now closed, leads downhill to the southwest to its former route across the Winnisook Club.

Turning north on the GP, the trail remains level, passing an official campsite and some muddy spots until it reaches the base of Giant Ledge 0.6 miles (0.97 km) later, where a good, reliable spring can be found via a short side trail. A climb of 0.15 miles (240 m) up the steep, rocky south slope of the ledge, sometimes assisted by rock steps, levels out at 3,200 feet (980 m), where the trail stays close to the east side. There are many viewpoints from the cliff tops here that take in the nearby Burroughs Range (Slide, Wittenberg and Cornell) to the south; the valley of Woodland Creek below with a small area of Ashokan Reservoir; and the Devil's Path to the northeast. There are more campsites, often likely to be taken early on good summer weekends.

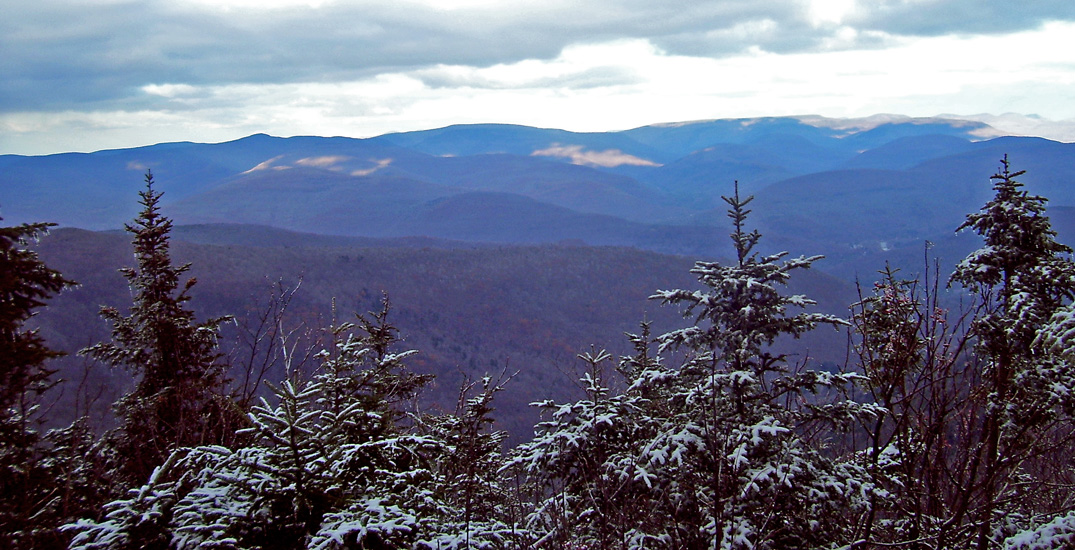
The Devil's Path from Panther's summit

The trail remains on the ledge for 0.3 miles (480 m), then drops down again more gently on the north slope. Not too long after reaching level ground, the 720-foot (220 m) climb up Panther proper begins. At first the trail gently switches back up some rocky stretches of the mountain's south slope, then at 0.75-mile (1.21 km) from the ledge, a short side trail leads to an excellent viewpoint over the Burroughs Range at about 3,300 feet (1,000 m). Another 0.2 miles (320 m) further, the trail passes a grassy area that has been home to a less reliable spring in the past. Not too far beyond, in the middle of two steep, rocky chutes, the trail passes the sign marking 3,500 feet (1,100 m) in elevation, above which open fires are forbidden and camping is only permitted in winter, due to the fragile high-montane environment. The trail levels off gently but there is still almost 0.5 miles (0.80 km) to the small ledge with a view to the northeast that marks the summit.

Via this route, it is 3.2 miles (5.1 km) to the summit. Total vertical gain is 1,920 feet (590 m); net is 1,720 feet (520 m), due to the presence of Giant Ledge along the trail. However, some more experienced hikers sometimes bushwhack around the base of the ledge to save themselves this extra vertical if they do not want to take in the views.

=== Northern route ===
The GP trail's northern end begins at a small parking area at the end of Fox Hollow Road, 1.5 miles (2.4 km) south of NY 28 at 1,420 feet (430 m) in elevation. At 0.4 miles (640 m) from that trailhead, a short side trail leads to the Fox Hollow lean-to and a reliable spring.

The trail then begins to climb the long ridge of Panther, finally reaching the first (3,480-foot; 1,060 m) of two false summits after 2.7 miles (4.3 km). A short descent follows, then another climb to the second false summit 0.6 miles (0.97 km) to the south. Along the way there is an excellent view of the peaks to the west: Balsam, Fir and Big Indian. It is another 1.2 miles (1.9 km) and a steeper climb to the actual summit.

Total distance via this route is 4.9 miles (7.9 km). Total vertical ascent is 2,450 feet (750 m).
