= Clauson Brook =

- Location of the mouth of Clauson Brook

Location
- Country: United States
- State: New York
- County: Delaware

Physical characteristics
- Source
  - coordinates: 42°02′52″N 75°05′44″W
- Mouth: East Branch Delaware River
  - coordinates: 42°01′17″N 75°05′32″W
  - elevation: 1,010 ft (310 m)

Clauson Brook is a river in Delaware County, New York. It flows into the East Branch Delaware River southwest of Shinhopple.
