= Mellis Brook =

- Location of the mouth of Mellis Brook in New York Mellis Brook (the United States)

Location
- Country: United States
- State: New York
- County: Delaware

Physical characteristics
- Source
  - coordinates: 42°06′52″N 75°00′54″W
- Mouth: Wilson Hollow Brook
  - coordinates: 42°05′51″N 75°00′38″W
  - elevation: 1,293 ft (394 m)

Mellis Brook is a river in Delaware County in New York. It flows into Wilson Hollow Brook northwest of Downsville.
