= Pleasant Valley Brook =

Location
- Country: United States
- State: New York

Physical characteristics
- Source
  - location: Delaware County, New York
- Mouth: East Branch Delaware River
  - location: Roxbury, New York, Delaware County, New York, United States
  - coordinates: 42°17′27″N 74°33′48″W
- Basin size: 5.15 mi^{2} (13.3 km^{2})

Pleasant Valley Brook flows into the East Branch Delaware River by Roxbury, New York.
