= Campbell Brook =

Location
- Country: United States
- State: New York
- County: Delaware

Physical characteristics
- Source
  - location: Delaware County, New York
- Mouth: East Branch Delaware River
  - location: Corbett, New York
  - coordinates: 42°02′42″N 75°01′19″W
- Basin size: 9.75 mi^{2} (25.3 km^{2})

Campbell Brook is a river in Delaware County, New York. It flows into the East Branch Delaware River by Corbett.
