= Gee Brook (Baxter Brook tributary) =

River of the Delaware basin in New York state, US

- Location of the mouth of Gee Brook in New York Gee Brook (Baxter Brook tributary) (the United States)

Location
- Country: United States
- State: New York
- County: Delaware

Physical characteristics
- Source
  - coordinates: 42°03′21″N 75°08′10″W
- Mouth: Baxter Brook
  - coordinates: 42°02′30″N 75°06′43″W
  - elevation: 1,115 ft (340 m)

Gee Brook is a river in Delaware County in New York. It flows into Baxter Brook north of Harvard.
