= Gee Brook =

- Location of the mouth of Gee Brook

Location
- Country: United States
- State: New York
- County: Delaware

Physical characteristics
- Source
  - coordinates: 41°54′58″N 75°13′50″W
- Mouth: East Branch Delaware River
  - coordinates: 41°56′09″N 75°14′26″W
  - elevation: 912 ft (278 m)

Gee Brook is a river in Delaware County, New York. It flows into the East Branch Delaware River southeast of Hancock.
