= City Brook =

Location
- Country: United States
- State: New York

Physical characteristics
- Source
  - location: Delaware County, New York
- Mouth: East Branch Delaware River
  - location: Tylers Switch, New York, Delaware County, New York, United States
  - coordinates: 41°58′12″N 75°13′13″W
- Basin size: 3.26 mi^{2} (8.4 km^{2})

City Brook flows into the East Branch Delaware River by Tylers Switch, New York.
