= Downs Brook =

Location
- Country: United States
- State: New York

Physical characteristics
- Source
  - location: Delaware County, New York
- Mouth: East Branch Delaware River
  - location: Downsville, New York, Delaware County, New York, United States
  - coordinates: 42°04′33″N 74°59′31″W
- Basin size: 26.8 mi^{2} (69 km^{2})

Basin features
- Tributaries
  - right: Doe Brook, Wilson Hollow Brook

Downs Brook is a river in Delaware County, New York. It flows into the East Branch Delaware River by Downsville, New York.
