= Karen Fraser =

6th Mayor of Lacey

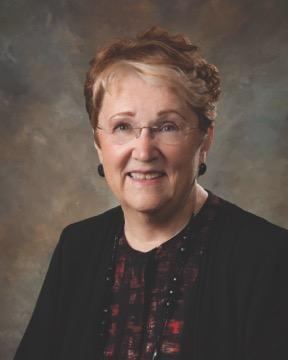

Member of the Washington Senate from the 22nd district
- In office January 11, 1993 – January 9, 2017
- Preceded by: Mike Kreidler
- Succeeded by: Sam Hunt

Member of the Washington House of Representatives from the 22nd district
- In office January 9, 1989 – January 11, 1993
- Preceded by: Jolene Unsoeld
- Succeeded by: Sandra Singery Romero

Thurston County Commissioner
- In office January 1, 1981 – January 1, 1989
- Succeeded by: Diane Oberquell

6th Mayor of Lacey, Washington
- In office January 22, 1976 – November 30, 1980
- Preceded by: William Bush
- Succeeded by: Mark Brown

Personal details
- Born: Karen Riese Fraser; September 12, 1944 (age 82) Seattle, Washington, U.S.
- Party: Democratic
- Spouse: Tim Malone (d. 2013)
- Children: 1
- Education: University of Washington (BA, MPA)

Karen Riese Fraser (born September 12, 1944) is an American politician who served in the state legislature of Washington. She was a Democratic member of the Washington House of Representatives from 1989 to 1993 and a state senator from 1993 to 2017. Fraser represented the Olympia–Lacey–Tumwater Metropolitan Statistical Area in Thurston County.

== Personal history ==
Karen Riese Fraser was born in Seattle on September 12, 1944. In 1967, Fraser began an internship at the Washington State Capitol through the Ford Foundation. Her work included being the only staff member of a health and welfare committee.

Fraser graduated from the University of Washington with a bachelor's degree in sociology and a Master of Public Administration from the university's Daniel J. Evans School of Public Affairs. She was founder of the Legislative International Caucus. By 1973, she was a member of the Thurston County chapter for National Organization for Women, serving in an elected position as a coordinator with the Washington State Legislature.

For parts of Fraser's career in the senate of the state legislature, she taught a state government and environmental policy class at Evergreen State College.

Fraser was married to Tim Malone, who once served as a senior assistant attorney general at the office of the Washington Attorney General. Malone, who was 78 years old, died while accompanying Fraser during a meeting in Alaska in July 2013. As of 2016, Fraser has one daughter and two grandchildren. An avid hiker and skier, Fraser had summited Glacier Peak as well as Mount Baker, Mount Olympus, and Mount St. Helens. She had participated in and won several sailboat races in Puget Sound, using her own vessel which was often crewed by women.

== Public servant career ==
Fraser moved to Lacey and was appointed in 1973 to the city council at the age of 28; she became mayor in 1976 and was the first woman in the city to serve in either office. During her five years as mayor, a city hall was constructed and a museum was founded. She was the election's chair for the 1977 Washington State Conference for Women. Fraser was elected to the Thurston County Commission in 1981 and served for 8 years.

Fraser was a Democratic member of the House of Representative from 1989 to 1993 and a state senator from 1993 to 2017. Fraser represented the 22nd district, which includes Olympia, Lacey, Tumwater, and northern Thurston County.

During her 28-year tenure in the state legislature, Fraser sponsored 90 bills that became state laws and held senior leadership positions in the Washington Senate. Bills included several environmental concerns, such as protections for the Nisqually River Basin, and Fraser sponsored a law for the creation of a Washington state 911 system. Other bills led by Fraser focused on women's history and aid for sex trafficking victims. Fraser's additions to the capital budget led to funding of local parks and recreation, such as Percival Landing, and the Washington Center for the Performing Arts and Hands On Children's Museum. Funding for other projects, included improvements of the Capitol Campus, as well as at Evergreen State College and South Puget Sound Community College. Fraser, along with two other representatives of the 22nd district, created the bill that established the Pacific chorus frog as the state's official amphibian. The effort began as a 3rd-grade class project by students of Boston Harbor Elementary School.

Fraser thrice led the Democratic caucus in the senate. She served on the several committees, such as the Rules Committee, and was a leader in state level international relations, which included three trade missions to China. Fraser was also the first woman President of the Washington State Association of Counties. Fraser was the vice-chair of the Senate's Ways and Means Committee during the mid-2000s and was responsible for construction budget requests.

In 2008, possibly for the first time in her career, Fraser was fined $225 (equivalent to $336.46 in 2025) by the state's Public Disclosure Commission (PDC) for failure to file a campaign funding disclosure before a deadline. The PDC declared the incident to be unintentional.

Fraser was an unsuccessful candidate for Lieutenant Governor during the primary of the 2016 Washington lieutenant gubernatorial election; she lost to fellow Democrat Cyrus Habib. She retired from office in 2017, joining the board of TVW and later became the head of Evergreen State College's board of trustees in 2019.

== Awards and recognition ==
In October 2017, the Olympia Woodland Trail was renamed to the Karen Fraser Woodland Trail in her honor.

Fraser received the Daniel J. Evans Nisqually Stewardship Award in 2024. She was the fourth recipient to receive the honor, which is given once per five years. The award is sponsored by the Nisqually River Foundation and presented to individuals who have "demonstrated tremendous leadership in the stewardship of the Nisqually Watershed". Fraser was a founding member of the Nisqually River Council and served as chair of the Nisqually River Task Force.
