= Watershed Park =

Public park in Olympia, Washington

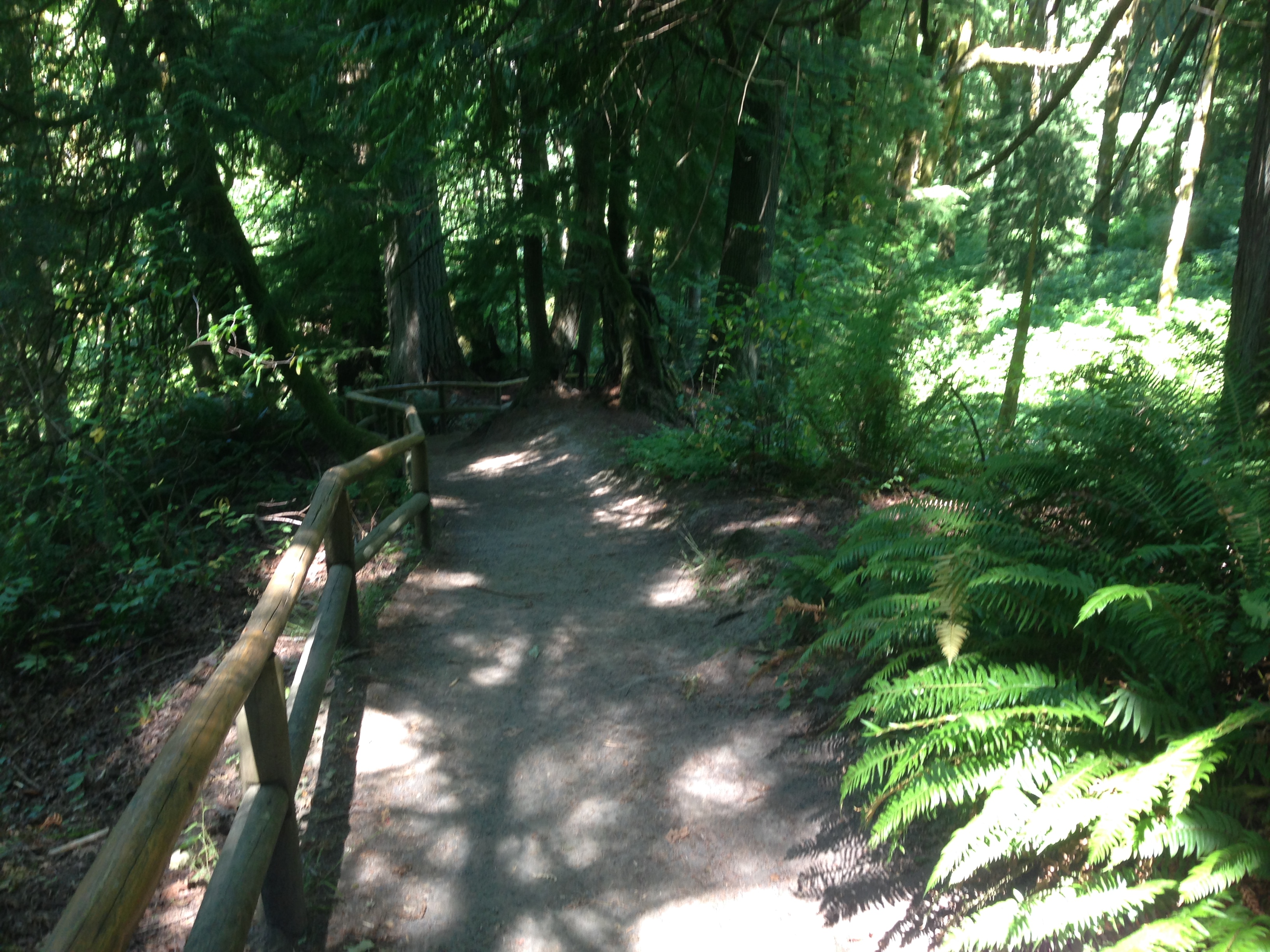
- One of several trails in Watershed Park
- Interactive map of Park location
- Type: Municipal
- Location: Olympia, Washington
- Coordinates: 47.028°N 122.886°W
- Area: 153.03 acres (0.6193 km^{2})
- Created: 1956
- Status: Open all year
- Website: Official City Website

Watershed Park is a 153-acre temperate rain forest public park located in Olympia, Washington that supplied almost all the city's water from privately established wells in the late 1800s. The city acquired and operated the wells starting in 1917 until the 1950s when the municipal water source was replaced. In 1955 the forest was to be logged and the land sold but strong local opposition resulted in an ordinance preserving the area as a city park. Throughout, remnants of the waterworks are visible from the park trails.

== History ==
The park takes its name from the watershed of Moxlie Creek. Water wells for the city of Olympia were first created in the area now comprising Watershed Park in the late 19th century. Influential Western Washington businessman Henry Clay Heermans bought the entire waterworks in 1909, and sold it to the City of Olympia in 1917.

After operating the wells into the 1950s, the city planned to log the area and sell the property, leading to a Washington Supreme Court battle that led to the area's preservation, with a city ordinance protecting the area presently. A local community group, Citizens for the Future, led by environmental activist and naturalist, Margaret McKenny, are recognized for establishing the park as a protected place.

== Features ==
The Moxlie Creek Springs Basin, one of the largest spring basins in the region, is situated in the center of the park, which is completely forested by a temperate rain forest. Skunk cabbage and salmon berries grow alongside Moxlie Creek, which weaves throughout the area. The creek is fed by groundwater and surface water runoff. Chinook, coho salmon and coastal cutthroat trout live in the creek. There are big leaf maple, douglas fir, red alder and incense cedar throughout the park, along with huckleberry, Oregon grape, licorice and sword ferns, and devil's club. The moderate to steep 1.5-mile (2.4 km) G. Eldon Marshall Trail loops around the park and wetland area. Evidence of the former waterworks in the form of pipes is scattered throughout the park, as well.

A future expansion of the paved Karen Fraser Woodland Trail will extend the trail to run along the northwestern edge of the park, creating a connection with Tumwater Falls Park. This expansion will connect with Watershed's hiking trails.

== Environmental Concerns ==
The park has suffered from gypsy moth infestations.

== See also ==
- History of Olympia, Washington
- Parks and recreation in Olympia, Washington
