= Jason Wise =

American dancer & choreographer

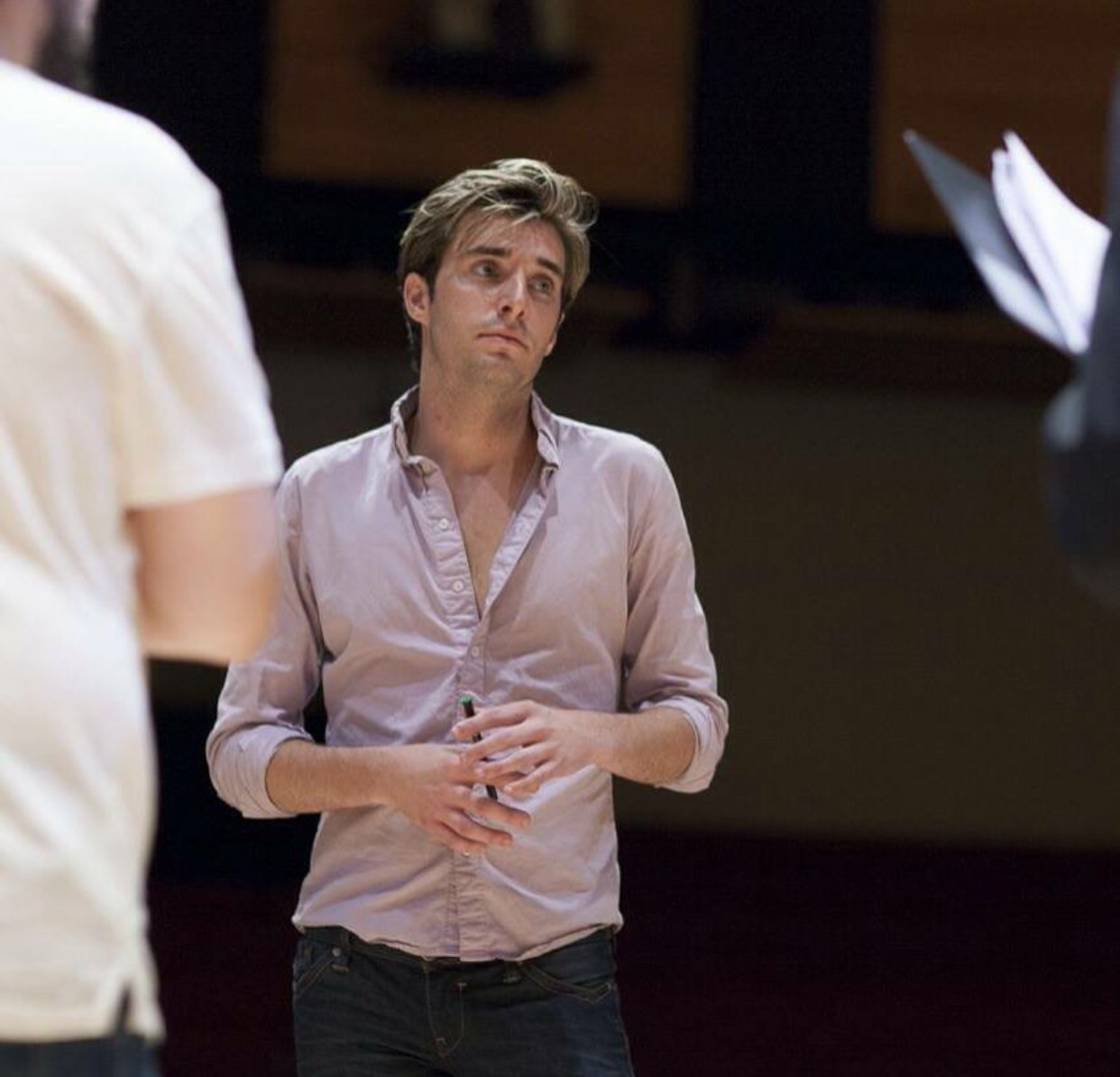
- Born: July 7, 1989 (age 37); Elmira, New York
- Education: The American Musical & Dramatic Academy, Upper West Side, New York City
- Occupations: Dancer, Choreographer, Director
- Years active: 1995 - present

Jason Wise (born July 7, 1989) is an American dancer, choreographer, and theatre director.

== Early life ==
Born in Elmira, New York, Wise began dancing at age 5 at Filippetti's Academy of Dance Arts in Horseheads, New York, where he won national titles at dance competitions across the country. He also attended and received scholarships to French Woods Festival of the Performing Arts and Stagedoor Manor. Wise attended and graduated from Horseheads High School.

== Early career ==
Wise moved to New York City, and attended the American Musical and Dramatic Academy. Upon graduation, he landed a job with The Walt Disney Company, performing in Toy Story: The Musical. Wise then joined the U.S. Company of Andrew Lloyd Webber's Cats, later performing the show in Canada, Costa Rica, Colombia, Panama, and Venezuela. Wise also appeared as the Carpet in the national tour of Beauty and the Beast.

In film and television, Wise made appearances on Lifetime's Dance Moms, ABC's Pan Am, NBC's Smash, The Wolf of Wall Street, and The Normal Heart on HBO.

== Michael Musto and The Village Voice ==
When Wise was 22, he came to the attention of New York journalist Michael Musto when Wise had written an open letter to The New York Times about Judy Garland. A year later, Musto interviewed Wise in his column in The Village Voice, "La Dolce Musto", featuring Wise's opinions on the gay generational divide. Musto said of Wise, "This guy sounded savvy beyond his years and proved to be the perfect young yin to my old yang."

Wise later discussed Judy Garland in the Netflix Documentary, Judy Garland: Too Young To Die alongside Garland’s son, Joseph Luft, and Grammy Award winner Rufus Wainwright.

== Later career ==
With guidance from Thommie Walsh, and ten-time Tony Award Winner Tommy Tune, Wise transitioned into becoming a director and choreographer.

Wise has staged shows and musical numbers for stars such as Donna McKechnie, Andrea McArdle, Faith Prince, Leslie Uggams, Maureen McGovern, Paige Davis, Julia Murney, Ashley Brown, Len Cariou, Carolee Carmello, Karen Mason, Howard McGillin, Linda Lavin, Sierra Boggess, Austin Scarlett, Karen Ziemba, Martha Wash, Lee Roy Reams, Brent Barrett, Tovah Feldshuh, B. D. Wong, and Christine Andreas.

Wise served as the director and choreographer for National Lampoon's Bayside: The Saved by the Bell Musical which featured original sitcom cast members Dustin Diamond, Dennis Haskins, Leanna Creel, and Ed Alonzo. He also served as the director and choreographer for National Lampoon's Full House: The Musical, which starred Perez Hilton. Both musicals were written by Bob and Tobly McSmith.

In 2016, Wise choreographed a revival of Cole Porter's Anything Goes, starring Andrea McArdle and Sally Struthers. The show opened at Gateway Playhouse on Long Island, and transferred to Ogunquit Playhouse in Maine. The production featured the Derek McLane sets and Martin Pakledinaz costumes from the 2011 Broadway Revival, which was produced by the Roundabout Theatre Company.

In 2018, Wise served as Choreographer for Mamma Mia!, a stage musical based on the songs of ABBA, Directed by Daniel C. Levine. The show opened ACT Of Connecticut, a new theater in Ridgefield, Connecticut, which operates under the Artistic Advisory of Stephen Schwartz (composer).

Later that year, Wise provided the Musical Staging for Ryan Raftery’s The Obsession Of Calvin Klein, a parody of Black Swan (film) documenting the rivalry of Calvin Klein and Ralph Lauren which ran at Joe's Pub at The Public Theater in New York City, before transferring to Los Angeles.

== Faculty ==
Wise serves on the Dance Faculty of Broadway Dance Center, The Joffrey Ballet, American Academy of Dramatic Arts, and Peridance Capezio Center, all of which are located in New York City.

== Personal life ==
Wise is openly gay, and lives in New York City.
