= Fish Creek (East Branch Delaware River tributary) =

Location
- Country: United States
- State: New York

Physical characteristics
- Source
  - location: Delaware County, New York
- Mouth: East Branch Delaware River
  - location: Fishs Eddy, New York, Delaware County, New York, United States
  - coordinates: 41°57′56″N 75°10′53″W
- Basin size: 11.4 mi^{2} (30 km^{2})

Basin features
- Tributaries
  - left: Knowles Brook

Fish Creek flows into the East Branch Delaware River by Fishs Eddy, New York.
