= Baxter Brook =

Location
- Country: United States
- State: New York

Physical characteristics
- Source
  - location: Delaware County, New York
- Mouth: East Branch Delaware River
  - location: Harvard, New York, Delaware County, New York, United States
  - coordinates: 42°01′20″N 75°07′05″W
- Basin size: 14.2 mi^{2} (37 km^{2})

Basin features
- Tributaries
  - left: Pine Mountain Branch
  - right: Bear Brook, Carcass Brook, Gee Brook

Baxter Brook flows into the East Branch Delaware River by Harvard, New York.
