= Eagle Mountain (Ulster County, New York) =

Mountain in Ulster County, New York

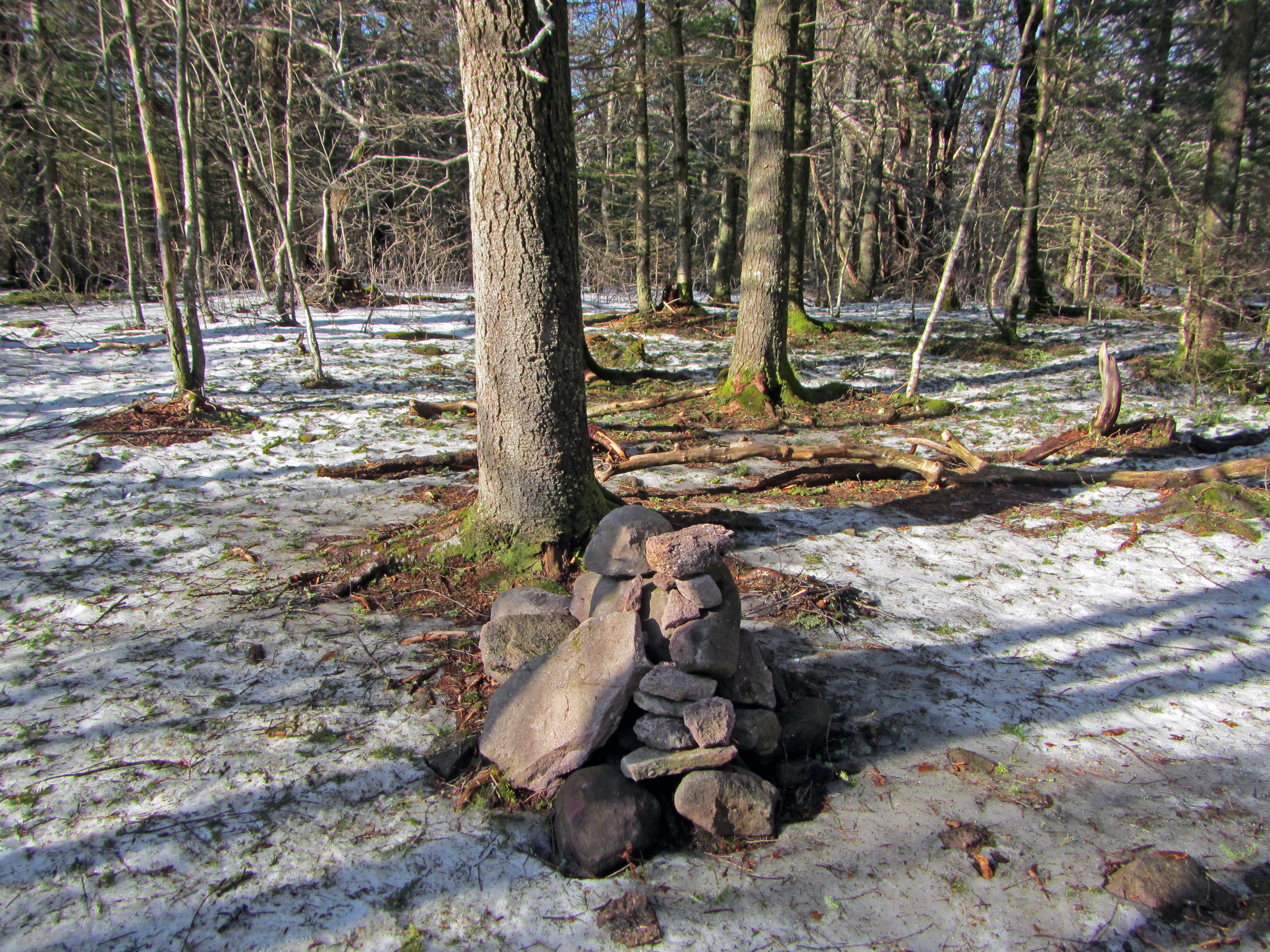
- Cairn marking the summit

Highest point
- Elevation: 3,610 ft (1,100 m)
- Prominence: 500 ft (150 m)
- Listing: Catskill High Peaks 27th
- Coordinates: 42°3.71′N 74°30.56′W

Geography
- Location within New York Location within the United States
- Location: Ulster County, New York
- Parent range: Catskill Mountains
- Topo map: USGS Seager

Eagle Mountain is a mountain located in Ulster County, New York. The mountain is part of the Catskill Mountains. Eagle Mountain is flanked to the north by Haynes Mountain, to the southwest by Doubletop Mountain and Graham Mountain, and to the southeast by Big Indian Mountain.

The east and northeast sides of Eagle Mountain drain into Esopus Creek, thence into the Hudson River, which drains into New York Bay. The north, west and south sides of Eagle Mtn. drain into Dry Brook, thence into the East Branch of the Delaware River, and into Delaware Bay.

Eagle Mountain is within the Big Indian Wilderness of New York's Catskill State Park. There is a supposed plane wreck on the mountain but the location of it has not been found

== See also ==
- List of mountains in New York
