= Wilson Hollow Brook =

Location
- Country: United States
- State: New York

Physical characteristics
- Source
  - location: Delaware County, New York
- Mouth: Downs Brook
  - location: Downsville, New York, Delaware County, New York, United States
  - coordinates: 42°04′58″N 74°59′38″W
- Basin size: 8.81 sq mi (22.8 km^{2})

Basin features
- Tributaries
  - left: Mellis Brook
  - right: Tub Mill Brook

Wilson Hollow Brook is a river in Delaware County, New York. It flows into Downs Brook in Downsville, New York.
