= Bolton Brook =

- Location of the mouth of Bolton Brook

Location
- Country: United States
- State: New York
- County: Delaware

Physical characteristics
- Source
  - coordinates: 42°00′47″N 75°08′56″W
- Mouth: East Branch Delaware River
  - coordinates: 41°59′53″N 75°09′02″W
  - elevation: 984 ft (300 m)

Bolton Brook is a river in Delaware County, New York. It flows into the East Branch Delaware River northwest of East Branch.
