= Spruce Mountain (Ulster County, New York) =

Mountain in New York

- Location within New York Location within the United States

Highest point
- Elevation: 3,386 feet (1,032 m)
- Coordinates: 42°01′03″N 74°27′00″W

Geography
- Location: Frost Valley, New York, U.S.
- Topo map: USGS Shandaken

Spruce Mountain is a mountain located in the Catskill Mountains of New York northeast of Frost Valley. Hemlock Mountain is located southeast and Panther Mountain is located northeast of Spruce Mountain.
