= Bryants Brook =

Location
- Country: United States
- State: New York

Physical characteristics
- Source
  - location: Delaware County, New York
- Mouth: Platte Kill
  - location: Dunraven, New York, Delaware County, New York, United States
  - coordinates: 42°08′54″N 74°41′43″W
- Basin size: 7.27 mi^{2} (18.8 km^{2})

Bryants Brook flows into the Platte Kill by Dunraven, New York.
