= Knowles Brook =

- Location of the mouth of Knowles Brook

Location
- Country: United States
- State: New York
- County: Delaware

Physical characteristics
- Source
  - coordinates: 41°57′00″N 75°06′41″W
- Mouth: Fish Creek
  - coordinates: 41°56′22″N 75°07′26″W
  - elevation: 1,535 ft (468 m)

Knowles Brook is a river in Delaware County, New York. It flows into Fish Creek east-southeast of Luzerne.
