= Carcass Brook =

- Location of the mouth of Carcass Brook in New York Carcass Brook (the United States)

Location
- Country: United States
- State: New York
- County: Delaware

Physical characteristics
- Source
  - coordinates: 42°05′10″N 75°08′50″W
- Mouth: Baxter Brook
  - coordinates: 42°03′22″N 75°06′33″W
  - elevation: 1,217 ft (371 m)

Carcass Brook is a river in Delaware County in New York. It flows into Baxter Brook north of Harvard.
