= Corbett, New York =

- Hamlet
- Location within the state of New York
- Coordinates: 42°02′36″N 75°01′19″W
- Country: United States
- State: New York
- County: Delaware
- Town: Colchester
- Elevation: 1,109 ft (338 m)
- Time zone: UTC-5 (Eastern (EST))
  - Summer (DST): UTC-4 (EDT)

Corbett is a hamlet in Delaware County, New York. It is located southeast of Downsville on the shore of the East Branch Delaware River. Campbell Brook flows west through the hamlet.
