= Pine Mountain Branch =

- Location of the mouth of Pine Mountain Branch in New York Pine Mountain Branch (the United States)

Location
- Country: United States
- State: New York
- County: Delaware

Physical characteristics
- Source
  - coordinates: 42°05′16″N 75°05′26″W
- Mouth: Baxter Brook
  - coordinates: 42°03′52″N 75°06′22″W
  - elevation: 1,289 ft (393 m)

Pine Mountain Branch is a river in Delaware County in New York. It flows into Baxter Brook north of Harvard.
