= Pierce Pond =

- Location of Pierce Pond within New York
- Location: Delaware County, New York
- Coordinates: 41°56′00″N 75°11′00″W
- Type: Lake
- Primary outflows: Lakin Brook
- Basin countries: United States
- Surface area: 16 acres (6.5 ha)
- Surface elevation: 1,588 ft (484 m)
- Settlements: French Woods

Pierce Pond is a small lake located north of the hamlet of French Woods in Delaware County, New York. Pierce Pond drains northwest via an Lakin Brook which flows into Peas Eddy Brook.

== See also ==
- List of lakes in New York
