= Giant Ledge =

Mountain in New York, United States

- Location within New York Location within the United States Location within the United States

Highest point
- Elevation: 3,048 feet (929 m)
- Coordinates: 42°02′24″N 74°23′41″W

Geography
- Location: New York, U.S.
- Topo map: USGS Shandaken

Giant Ledge is a cliff located in the Catskill Mountains of New York. Panther Mountain is located north of Giant Ledge. A 6.3 mile in and out trail is accessible from the Giant Ledge trailhead which provides access to both mountains and their peaks.
