= Hemlock Mountain =

Mountain in New York, United States

- Location within New York Location within the United States

Highest point
- Elevation: 3,248 feet (990 m)
- Coordinates: 42°00′46″N 74°26′21″W

Geography
- Location: Frost Valley, New York, U.S.
- Topo map: USGS Shandaken

Hemlock Mountain is a mountain located in the Catskill Mountains of New York northeast of Frost Valley. Spruce Mountain is located northwest, Wildcat Mountain is located southwest and Panther Mountain is located northeast of Hemlock Mountain.
