= Bear Brook (Baxter Brook tributary) =

- Location of the mouth of Bear Brook in New York Bear Brook (Baxter Brook tributary) (the United States)

Location
- Country: United States
- State: New York
- County: Delaware

Physical characteristics
- Source
  - coordinates: 42°05′39″N 75°07′50″W
- Mouth: Baxter Brook
  - coordinates: 42°04′45″N 75°06′34″W
  - elevation: 1,421 ft (433 m)

Bear Brook is a river in Delaware County in New York. It flows into Baxter Brook north of Harvard.
