= Tub Mill Brook =

- Location of the mouth of Tub Mill Brook in New York Tub Mill Brook (the United States)

Location
- Country: United States
- State: New York
- County: Delaware

Physical characteristics
- Source
  - coordinates: 42°05′32″N 75°01′34″W
- Mouth: Wilson Hollow Brook
  - coordinates: 42°05′12″N 75°00′03″W
  - elevation: 1,175 ft (358 m)

Tub Mill Brook is a river in Delaware County in New York. It flows into Wilson Hollow Brook in Downsville.
