= Platte Kill =

Location
- Country: United States
- State: New York

Physical characteristics
- Source
  - location: Delaware County, New York
- Mouth: East Branch Delaware River
  - location: Dunraven, Middletown, Delaware County, New York United States
  - coordinates: 42°07′31″N 74°41′34″W
- Basin size: 35.4 mi^{2} (92 km^{2})

Basin features
- Tributaries
  - right: Bryants Brook

Platte Kill flows into the East Branch Delaware River by Dunraven, New York.
