= Morrison Brook =

- Location of the mouth of Morrison Brook

Location
- Country: United States
- State: New York
- County: Delaware

Physical characteristics
- Source
  - coordinates: 42°03′01″N 75°08′27″W
- Mouth: East Branch Delaware River
  - coordinates: 42°00′56″N 75°07′45″W
  - elevation: 988 ft (301 m)

Morrison Brook is a river in Delaware County, New York. It flows into the East Branch Delaware River north of East Branch.
