= Karen Fraser Woodland Trail =

Hiking trail in Thurston County, Washington state

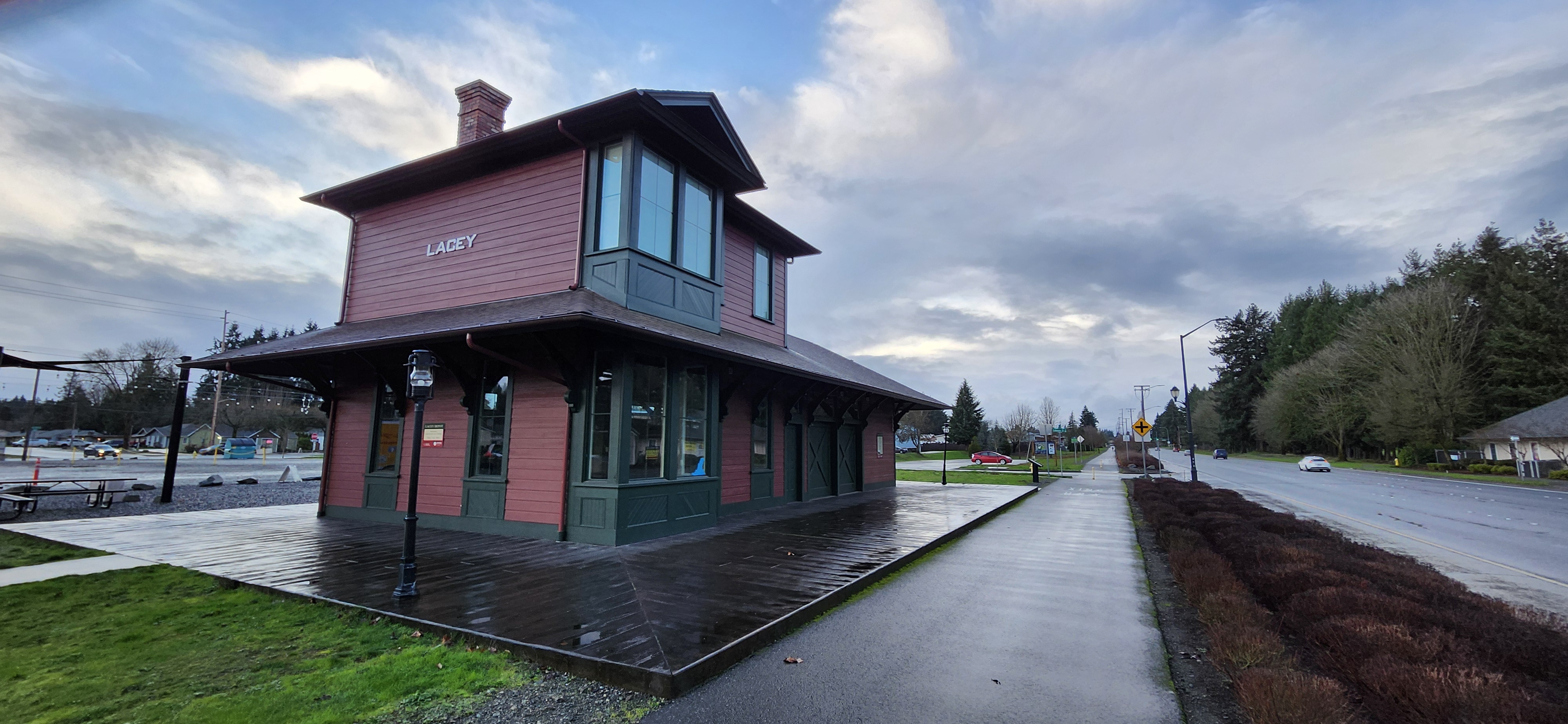
- Lacey Depot at the Karen Fraser Woodland Trail, 2026
- Length: 4.7 miles (7.6 km)
- Location: Thurston County, Washington
- Began construction: 2006 (as the Woodland Trail)
- Completed: 2016
- Trailheads: Multiple including Watershed Park
- Use: Biking, hiking, walking
- Grade: Gentle, 3% or less
- Difficulty: Easy to moderate
- Season: Open year-round
- Sights: Lacey Depot, Hub Junction
- Hazards: Multiple crossings of roadways
- Surface: Paved
- Maintainer: Cities of Lacey and Olympia
- Website: Karen Fraser Woodland Trail (Lacey); Karen Fraser Woodland Trail (Olympia)

The Karen Fraser Woodland Trail, previously known as the Woodland Trail, is a 4.7-mile (7.6 km) paved rail trail in Thurston County, Washington that connects the cities of Olympia and Lacey along an abandoned Burlington Northern corridor.

Purchases of the rail line began in the early 2000s and construction commenced in 2006. The route, then known as the Woodland Trail, was officially connected with the Chehalis Western Trail in 2007. The intersection, located at the border between the two cities, is known as Hub Junction and was completed in 2016. The pathway was renamed in honor of Lacey public servant, Karen Fraser. in 2017.

Over its course from east to west, the trail begins in Lacey near Woodland Creek Community Park and the city's depot, crossing the border between the two cities at the roundabout junction. Continuing into Olympia, the path at times parallels Indian Creek and Interstate 5 before terminating at a trailhead near Watershed Park. Various historical markers and public artworks are located on the trail, particularly at or near the Lacey and Olympia trailheads.

== History ==
In 1990, Olympia residents Jim and Carol Rainwood suggested the creation of the trail and formed the Woodland Trail Greenway Association {WTGA) who contributed time and resources to trail development. Their work resulted in the creation of the Olympia Woodland Trail and the Lacey Woodland Trail. The WTGA, during the first phases of paving the trail in 2006, donated $3,000 and guaranteed 200 hours of labor for the project.

The city of Lacey began to obtain rail lines from Burlington Northern and Georgia-Pacific between 2002 and 2005. An agreement was made by Lacey and Georgia-Pacific, who were the sole users of the rail line, not to challenge the attempt to consider the track as abandoned as part of a federal railbanking program. (Note: As the rail track was being considered abandoned, the city of Lacey paid $369,000 to Georgia-Pacific as the company switched from using the track to transport its goods and materials by truck.) In conjunction with Olympia, both cities had acquired 3.5 miles (5.6 km) by 2004. Paving of the first section started at Sleater-Kinney in 2006 with funding for the project furnished in part by a $229,000 state grant. Over an additional $600,000 was provided by the city of Lacey and the Thurston Regional Planning Council.

The Woodland Trail, as it was known at the time, was officially connected to the Chehalis Western Trail during a ceremony on December 2, 2007.

The completion of two undeveloped sections were undertaken during a project begun in May 2009 at a cost of under $2 million. Meant to fully pave the trail, measured at 2.25 miles (3.62 km) at the time, the efforts also included landscaping of the entire pathway and the installation of pedestrian crossings. During this time, the city removed encroachments in the right of way of the trail, including fencing and abandoned vehicles.

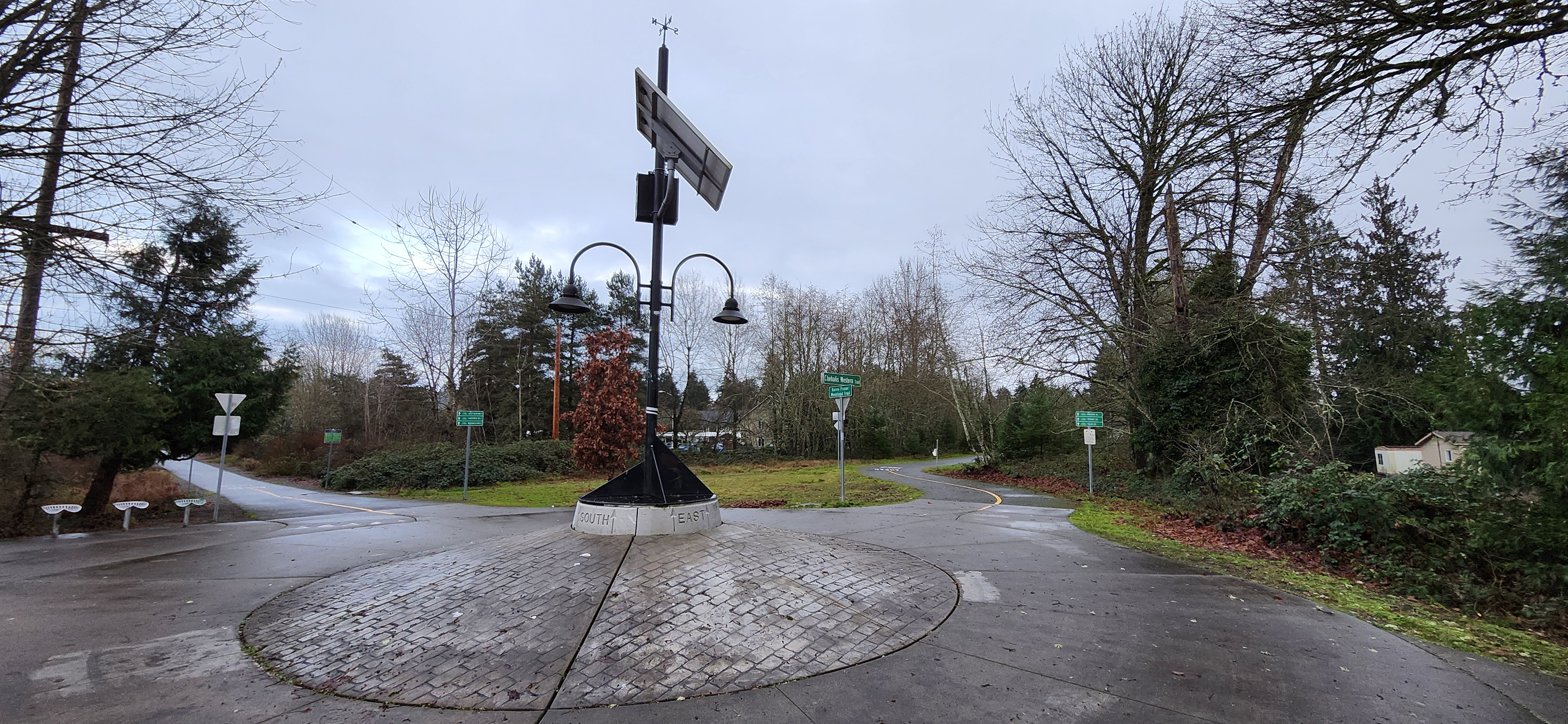
Hub Junction, 2026

The last bridge for the Chehalis Western Trail, part of a larger project known as "Bridging the Gap", was completed in December 2014. The span marked the final step in connecting the Chehalis Western to the Olympia Woodland Trail. At the crossing is a bicycle traffic circle and plaza known as Hub Junction. Dedicated in March 2016, the roundabout is considered to have been the first such of its type in the state. In October 2017, the two Woodland trails were renamed with a single name to honor State Senator Karen Fraser who previously represented the area and was, in 1976, the first female mayor of Lacey.

== Route ==
At the beginning trailhead at Watershed Park, the 4.7-mile (7.6 km) Karen Fraser Woodland Trail heads east, briefly following Interstate 5 and Indian Creek before crossing the Olympia border into the city of Lacey. The trail crosses the Chehalis Western Trail at a roundabout connection named Hub Junction. The trail continues on an easterly course past the Lacey Depot, part of a picnic and trained-themed playground area known as Depot Park. A pedestrian bridge off the trail allows access to Woodland Creek Community Park near Long Lake; the Karen Fraser pathway terminates shortly thereafter.

In September 2016, a biking and hiking trail from the Indian Creek neighborhood at Fairview Street was connected to the Karen Fraser Woodland Trail. The effort was undertaken by the Indian Creek Neighborhood Association and Olympia's Neighborhood Pathways Program.

During a seven-month study between 2015 and 2016, over 57,000 combined bicyclists and walkers had used the trail.

=== Future plans ===
Future phases will extend the trail west through Watershed Park, crossing the Deschutes River, and ending at Tumwater Falls. The future Deschutes Valley Trail will start at Tumwater Falls and continue the trail to Pioneer Park. The Karen Fraser Woodland Trail is planned to be connected to the entire rail trail system in the county, which also includes the Gate to Belmore Trail.

== Features ==
The Olympia trailhead features a sustainably designed shelter and restroom with a living roof and a rain garden.

=== Public art and historical markers ===
A glass mosaic portrait, titled, Cultivating the Future, is installed at Woodland Community Park. The artwork portrays Nat and Thelma Jackson, a married couple noted for their service to the community. The mosaic was created by artist, Jennifer Kuhns, recognized for her work at Olympia's Artesian Commons.

Three historical markers regarding the Lacey Plywood Plant, Lacey Rotary Club, and the Lacey Train Depot are located next to the trail at the train station.

A pair of ten-foot cedar wood carvings, created by an artist of the Squaxin Island Tribe, were installed at the Watershed trailhead in 2021 after an arts initiative begun by the city of Olympia. A commemoration marker to honor a local couple for their civil rights work was installed on the trail at Goose Pond in 2022.

== See also ==
- Parks and recreation in Olympia, Washington
- Yelm–Rainier–Tenino Trail
