= Huckleberry Brook =

Location
- Country: United States
- State: New York

Physical characteristics
- Source
  - location: Delaware County, New York
- Mouth: East Branch Delaware River
  - location: Margaretville, New York, Delaware County, New York, United States
  - coordinates: 42°07′25″N 74°40′25″W
- Basin size: 5.39 mi^{2} (14.0 km^{2})

Huckleberry Brook flows into the East Branch Delaware River by Margaretville, New York.
