= Doe Brook =

- Location of the mouth of Doe Brook in New York Doe Brook (the United States)

Location
- Country: United States
- State: New York
- County: Delaware

Physical characteristics
- Source
  - coordinates: 42°07′20″N 74°58′26″W
- Mouth: Downs Brook
  - coordinates: 42°06′07″N 74°58′16″W
  - elevation: 1,270 ft (390 m)

Doe Brook is a river in Delaware County in New York. It flows into Downs Brook northeast of Downsville.
