= Lakin Brook =

- Location of the mouth of Lakin Brook

Location
- Country: United States
- State: New York
- County: Delaware

Physical characteristics
- Source: Pierce Pond
  - coordinates: 41°55′49″N 75°09′27″W
  - elevation: 1,588 ft (484 m)
- Mouth: Peas Eddy Brook
  - coordinates: 41°56′23″N 75°12′34″W
  - elevation: 1,171 ft (357 m)

Lakin Brook is a river in Delaware County, New York. It drains Pierce Pond and flows west, then turns north, then west again before converging with Peas Eddy Brook east-southeast of Peas Eddy.
