= Sand Pond (New York) =

- Location of Sand Pond within New York
- Location: Delaware County, New York
- Coordinates: 41°54′57″N 75°11′04″W
- Type: Lake
- Basin countries: United States
- Surface area: 48 acres (19 ha)
- Surface elevation: 1,480 ft (450 m)
- Settlements: French Woods

Sand Pond is a small lake located south of the hamlet of French Woods in Delaware County, New York. The pond is also directly adjacent to French Woods Festival Of The Performing Arts. Sand Pond drains south via an unnamed creek that flows into Bouchoux Brook. Pierce Pond is located north of Sand Pond.

== See also ==
- List of lakes in New York
