= Intransitive Recordings =

- Type: Independent Record Publisher
- Industry: Music
- Genre: Electroacoustic, Electronic, Free Improvisation, Improvisation, Noise
- Founded: 1997, Gainesville, Florida
- Headquarters: MA, United States
- Key people: Howard Stelzer; Artists: Kommissar Hjuler, Roel Meelkop, Kapotte Muziek, [[Lionel Marchetti]], C. Spencer Yeh, Nerve Net Noise

Intransitive Recordings was an independent record label for experimental music, founded by the artist Howard Stelzer. Intransitive published electro-acoustic music, free improvisation, sound art, sound poetry, and noise music between its start in 1997 until its ending in 2012.

Stelzer explained that "... (the) reason for starting Intransitive was to publish my own work. I had recorded Stone Blind, a one-hour-long tape piece, and knew that no one outside of Florida had ever heard of me, so no one would have any reason to put it out. I just did it myself, and subsequently fell in love with the idea of putting out CDs."

In 1998, Stelzer decided to publish work by other composers and reached out to artists whose music he had long admired. "Since it was so easy to publish one CD, I felt empowered (and bold!) enough to ask two of my favorite artists, Brume (Christian Renou, from France) and Kapotte Muziek (Frans de Waard, from the Netherlands) to submit an album for me to put out."

In 2002, Stelzer was asked by Philippe Petit of Bip-Hop Magazine if his label's mission was to discover and promote up-and-coming new artists. He replied that it was not: "Many of the artists whose work appears on Intransitive are folks whose music I’ve been excited about since I was young. Brume, for example, is someone whose music first excited me when I was 16 years old and in high school. Frans de Waard's Kapotte Muziek records and cassettes are things I’ve been listening to for years and years. Same with Marc Behrens and others. In many cases, I use the label to give something back (in a way) to the artists who I admire by publishing their new works.

In 2009, the label added a sub-division called Songs From Under the Floorboards (named after the song by Magazine) in order to publish small-edition CDRs.

In addition to publishing CDs, CDRs and records, Intransitive Recordings also hosted concerts in the Boston area.

== Partial Discography ==
- int004 Kapotte Muziek The Use of Recycling
- int006 Brume Kreig
- int007 Roel Meelkop '6 (Mailcop Rules)'
- int013 v/a - Variious (feat: Taylor Deupree, Voice Crack, Kevin Drumm, Brume, Roel Meelkop, Michael Prime, Jerome Noetinger, John Watermann)
- int014 Lionel Marchetti Knud um Nom du Serpent (Le Cercle des Entrailles)
- int015 Mike Bullock / Howard Stelzer & Jason Talbot The Idea of Northeast
- int017 M.Behrens Elapsed Time
- int018 Bernhard Gal Relisten
- int020 Nerve Net Noise Meteor Circuit
- int021 Howard Stelzer & Jason Talbot Songs
- int022 Seth Nehil/JGrzinich 'Confluence'
- int024 Roel Meelkop 5 (Ambiences)
- int025 Kapotte Muziek & Lethe Tsurumai
- int027 Brendan Murray Wonders Never Cease
- int028 Seht & Howard Stelzer Exactly What You Lost
- int029 Nerve Net Noise Dark Garden
- int030 Howard Stelzer Bond Inlets
- int031 Lionel Marchetti & Seijiro Murayama Hatali Atseli (L'Echgange des Yeux)
- int032 Jim Haynes Sever
- int033 Kommissar Hjuler & Mama Baer Asylum Lunaticum
- int034 Lethe Catastrophe Point #5
- int036 Failing Lights Failing Lights
- int037 C. Spencer Yeh 1975

== See also ==
- List of record labels
