= Fir Mountain (New York) =

Mountain in New York, United States

- Location within New York Location within the United States

Highest point
- Elevation: 3620+ ft (1103+ m) NGVD 29
- Prominence: 420 ft (130 m)
- Listing: Catskill High Peaks 25th
- Coordinates: 42°01′39″N 74°28′09″W

Geography
- Location: Ulster County, New York
- Parent range: Catskill Mountains
- Topo map: USGS Shandaken

Fir Mountain is a mountain located in Ulster County, New York. The mountain is part of the Catskill Mountains. Fir Mountain is flanked to the northwest by Big Indian Mountain, and to the southeast by Spruce Mountain.

The east side of Fir Mountain drains into Esopus Creek, thence into the Hudson River, and into New York Bay. The northwest end of Fir Mtn. drains into Elk Bushkill, thence into Esopus Creek. The west and south sides of Fir Mtn. drain into Biscuit Brook, thence into the West Branch of the Neversink River, the Delaware River, and into Delaware Bay.

Fir Mountain is within the Big Indian Wilderness of New York's Catskill State Park.

== See also ==
- List of mountains in New York
