= Big Indian Mountain =

Mountain in the United States

- Location within New York Location within the United States

Highest point
- Elevation: 3700+ ft (1128+ m) NGVD 29
- Prominence: 500 ft (150 m)
- Listing: Catskill High Peaks 19th
- Coordinates: 42°02′06″N 74°29′48″W

Geography
- Location: Ulster County, New York
- Parent range: Catskills
- Topo map: USGS Shandaken

Big Indian Mountain is a mountain located in Ulster County, New York. The mountain is part of the Catskill Mountains. It is flanked to the northwest by Eagle Mountain, to the southeast by Fir Mountain, and to the southwest by Doubletop Mountain.

The northeast slopes of Big Indian Mountain drain into Elk Bushkill, thence into Esopus Creek, the Hudson River, and into New York Bay. The north end of Big Indian Mountain drains into Shandaken Brook, thence into Dry Brook, the East Branch of the Delaware River, and into Delaware Bay. The west side of Big Indian Mtn. drains into the headwaters of Dry Brook. The southern slopes of Big Indian Mountain drain into Biscuit Brook and Pigeon Brook, thence into the West Branch of the Neversink River, and the Delaware River.

Big Indian Mountain is within the Big Indian–Beaverkill Range Wilderness Area, part of New York's Catskill State Park.

== See also ==
- List of mountains in New York
