= Goem =

Dutch electronic band

Goem (pronounced [ɣum]) is the electronic music project of Frans de Waard, Peter Duimelinks and Roel Meelkop. Active since 1996, it is one of the most internationally visible projects hailing from the Netherlands. They have about twenty CD and vinyl releases on various labels from Europe and North America.

== Trivia ==
Goem and Kapotte Muziek share the same members. Goem is a Russian word for stores that we reserved for the apparatchiks, the members of the establishment of the Soviet Communist Party.

== See also ==
- Kapotte Muziek
