= Oliverea, New York =

Oliverea is a populated place in Ulster County, New York, United States. It is situated on Esopus Creek along Ulster Country Route 47 within Catskill State Park. The community is located at 42°03′55″N 74°27′37″W in the Town of Shandaken.
