= Moxlie Creek =

Creek in Thurston County, Washington state

- Interactive map of Creek location
- Etymology: R. W. Moxlie, settler

Location
- Country: United States
- State: Washington
- County: Thurston County

Physical characteristics
- Source: Watershed Park
  - coordinates: 47°02′19″N 122°53′28″W
- Mouth: East Bay, Budd Inlet
- Length: 1.8 miles (2.9 km)
- Basin size: 1,472 acres (596 ha)

Basin features
- Geographic Names Information System: 1506854

Moxlie Creek is a stream in Thurston County in the U.S. state of Washington. The creek is located in the state capitol of Olympia and originates from artesian springs in Watershed Park. The stream flows north into the East Bay of Budd Inlet.

== History ==
Moxlie Creek was named after R. W. Moxlie, an early settler.

For over 50 years the park groundwater was used to supply the city's drinking water, and waterworks remnants can be seen in the area.

== Course and watershed ==
More than a third of the creek's 1.8-mile (2.9 km) length is piped underground between the headwaters at Watershed Park and its terminus at East Bay of Budd Inlet.

The 1,472-acre (596 ha) watershed extends southeast to Boulevard and Log Cabin Roads, west to portions of the South Capitol Neighborhood, and east to the top of the 4th Avenue hill.

== Environment and ecology ==
Fecal coliform bacteria and other contaminants have been detected in the creek water. Occasionally, Chinook salmon, coho, and cutthroat trout can be found in the section of creek within the park; salmon are often spotted in September and October.

== See also ==
- List of geographic features in Thurston County, Washington
