= Peas Eddy Brook =

Location
- Country: United States
- State: New York

Physical characteristics
- Source
  - location: Delaware County, New York
- Mouth: East Branch Delaware River
  - location: Peas Eddy, New York, Delaware County, New York, United States
  - coordinates: 41°56′45″N 75°13′57″W
- Basin size: 5.87 mi^{2} (15.2 km^{2})

Basin features
- Tributaries
  - right: Lakin Brook

Peas Eddy Brook flows into the East Branch Delaware River by Peas Eddy, New York.
