= Howard Stelzer =

- Born: 1974 (age 51–52); Belle Harbor, New York
- Genre: Electro-acoustic
- Instrument: cassette tapes
- Labels: Intransitive Recordings, No Rent Records, Chocolate Monk, Love Earth Music
- Website: https://howardstelzer.bandcamp.com/

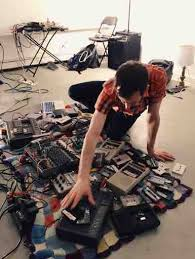
Howard Stelzer performs at Washington Street Gallery in Somerville, MA

Howard Stelzer is a composer of electronic music, whose work is made primarily from sounds generated by cassette tapes and tape players. From 1997 until 2012, he ran the independent record label Intransitive Recordings.

== Early years ==
Stelzer began making music using cassette tapes and metal percussion while he was a teenager in Boca Raton, Florida. After attempting unsuccessfully to learn how to play conventional instruments, he decided instead to use cassette tapes as the source of his music. Beginning in 1996, all of Stelzer's music would be made with manipulated cassette tapes.

I think tapes are simply the language that I speak. When I think about music ideas, I only and always think of them in terms of how they’d be articulated via cassette tapes. – 2016 interview with Tabs Out Podcast

Stelzer explained how he first became "fascinated with (cassette tapes) as sound-producing objects: "When I was in high school (1989–1992) and banging on trash cans in my parents' garage with a boom box recording in the corner, I discovered how the sound captured on the cassette was different from the acoustic sound in the room while I was making the music. From then on, I experimented with making collages on tape-copying decks, furiously pressing the pause button on the record side while changing the source tape on the other."

His first widely-available album, "Stone Blind", was a CD self-released on Stelzer's own Intransitive Recordings label in 1997. The album consisted of three related pieces, each roughly 20 minutes long and made out of crudely spliced cassette tapes assembled with a two-cassette stereo component. Each track was recorded in a single take to one side of a 40-minute tape; a piece ended when the tape ran out.

== First performances and recordings ==
In 1998, Stelzer moved to Boston, Massachusetts. His performances over the next several years were mainly improvised, either solo or with duos or groups. His most frequent collaborator from 1999 until 2003 was Jason Talbot, who played a turntable in a manner similar to that in which Stelzer played cassette tapes. Stelzer credits these years as having a lasting impact on his thinking: "Everything I thought about music for a long time was based on playing with Jason Talbot. The way I played before I started playing with him was pretty ignorant. I just had a whole lot of tape decks and would put tapes in and hit play, and hope that it would sound all right. But Jason got me thinking more about physicality and improvisation, and I started to think of myself more as a player. That really fundamentally changed what I did with the tape decks, and how my sounds fit in the space, and how they worked compositionally and as live performance."

Critics noted the energy of the duo's live performances, but reception to their recordings was mixed:

For Stelzer and Talbot, on the other hand, pause is a weapon, and subversion is the norm, not a change from it. The goal of Songs is disorientation; play it while you're doing something else, and you might think the volume's too low, until an eardrum-bursting noise comes out of nowhere. Listening to it loud in headphones can almost be painful. – Dusted Magazine review of Songs

Stelzer himself seemed to agree. He steadily began moving away from live improvisation and venturing more into studio-based composition. "At first, my published works were simply unvarnished recordings of live improvisations using tape players, but I was never 100% happy with those. As I listened to them, I'd notice that I was mentally filling in the gaps of what should have been fuller sound, more stereo separation, clearer dynamic range, tighter construction... By the time I made the "Mincing Perfect Words" 3"CDR for Chondritic Sound, I felt like I finally produced music that worked as a home listening experience, and not a performance document. Thus emboldened, I diced up my failed earlier recordings and transformed them into “Bond Inlets”, which I consider my first artistically successful proper album after numerous false starts.

== Compositions ==
Bond Inlets was released by Intransitive Recordings as a CD in 2008, and was the first to receive generally favorable notice from critics.

It would be unforgivable to overlook 1998's Bond Inlets, Stelzer’s crowning achievement; an album where he was able to pick the inherent limitations of consumer-grade tapes apart, laying out a foreboding work of rare emotional power. – Tiny Mix Tapes

Subsequent albums included Brayton Point, released in 2014 by Dokuro, which was built out of recordings of the Brayton Point Power Station, the largest coal-fired power generation plant in Massachusetts. The album received the unusual distinction of being recognized in the Boston Globe's year-end business section as one of Massachusetts' "Most Offbeat Business Stories of 2014":

Strangest Use for a Giant Power Plant: When you think power plant, the first thing that comes to mind is a musical melody, right? Oh, wait... electronic music composer Howard Stelzer turned the still-operational Brayton Point coal plant into a giant musical instrument by recording ambient sounds at the site and turning it into a 49-minute album. – Boston Globe

Critical response to Brayton Point was generally positive:

For his first solo album since 2008's Bond Inlets, Howard Stelzer captured sound at the Brayton Point power plant in Somerset, Massachusetts. That’s intriguing on its own, but it seems an inaccurate way to characterize the resulting album. The single, 50-minute piece Stelzer concocted is so much more dense and evocative than the term "field recording" could ever suggest. It’s like calling something a guitar album – it may narrow the context, but it says almost nothing about the listening experience. – The Out Door There's development, at least in terms of sounds transforming from a beginning of identifiable clankings and machine-hums to full-on space gales into moments of tinnitus-shrouded pig screams, to its furnace-blast endpoint... As a hymn to power and a memorial to decrepit industrialisation, Brayton Point is remarkable. – Cyclic Defrost

== Collaborations ==
Since 2019, Stelzer's work has taken on more collaborative and musical elements. The album Invariably Falling Forward, Into the Thickets of Closure included contributions from singers such as Peter Hope, Stefan Neville (Pumice), Elisabeth King, Audrey Chen, Tom Smith (To Live and Shave in L.A.), Antony Milton and Bill Ironfield. Chain D.L.K. writes that "...this album really takes advantage of headphones, because there are so many things happening that it would be easy to miss them all if you don't listen to it that way."

The large-scale collaborative idea expanded further with the five-volume Suburban Observances series. For that project, Stelzer sent sounds to artists around the world who were instructed to manipulate and change them as much as possible. Stelzer then tasked himself to recompose the transformed material into new forms. Some artists who contributed to this series have been Fani Konstantidou, Ralf Wehowsky (P16.D4), Blake Edwards, Yan Jun, Tori Kudo (Maher Shalal Hash Baz (band)), Teresa Smith, Roel Meelkop, Thaniel Ion Lee, Rudolf Eb.er, Phil Todd, John Wiese, France Jobin and many others.

== Partial discography ==
- Songs] CD (Intransitive Recordings, US) with Jason Talbot
- Night Life CD (Korm Plastics, NL) with Giuseppe Ielasi
- Mincing Perfect Words 3"CDr (Chondritic Sound, US)
- Tomorrow No One Will Be Safe CD (Troniks, US) with Jazzkammer
- Bond Inlets CD (Intransitive Recordings, US)
- The Impossible Astronaut c40 (NNA, US)
- Pink Pearl CD (Bocian, PO) with Frans de Waard
- How To CD (Phage Tapes, US)
- The Case Against CD (Monotype Rec., PO)
- Brayton Point CD (Dokuro, IT)
- Dawn Songs c40 (No Rent Records, US)
- Sun Pass c40 (Moss Archive, US)
- A Strange Object Covered With Fur Which Breaks Your Heart c40 (No Rent Records, US)
- Across the Blazer CD (Marginal Frequency, US)
- Nests CDr (Humanhood Recordings, US) with Nerve Net Noise
- Anathematization of the World is Not an Adequate Response to the World 2CDr (Chocolate Monk, UK)
- Their Crowning Achievement CDr (Chocolate Monk, UK) with Neil Campbell
- Invariably Falling Forward, Into the Thickets of Closure 3CD (No Rent Records, US)
- Shaking Off the Metaphors (Suburban Observances Volume 1) CDr (Chocolate Monk, UK)
- I've Told You Once (Suburban Observances Volume 2) tape (Tribe Tapes, US)
- Euclid Is a Dead Sponge (Suburban Observances Volume 3) CDr (Oxidation, US)
- Your Own Working Class Will Bury You (Suburban Observances Volume 4)] CDr (Humanhood Recordings, US)
- The Flemish Giants (Suburban Observances Volume 5) CDr (Love Earth Music, US)
- This Is It CDr (Love Earth Music, US) with Richard Youngs
- oh calm down you're fine tape (No Rent Records, US)
- We Agree tape (Kringloop Kassettes, NL) with Modelbau
- We All Are DAT (Now DAT's What I Call Music, NL)
- Mathematic Sun 2xc40 (Buried In Slag and Debris, CA) with ABH/Nobuo Yamada
- Five Thousand Pretenders Who Passed the Test By Luck Alone CD (Rural Isolation Project, US)
