= Balsam Mountain (Greene County, New York) =

Mountain in New York, US

- Location within New York Location within the United States

Highest point
- Elevation: 3,353 feet (1,022 m)
- Coordinates: 42°11′01″N 74°23′15″W

Geography
- Location: Pine Hill, New York, U.S.
- Topo map: USGS West Kill

Balsam Mountain is a mountain located in the Catskill Mountains of New York south-southwest of Pine Hill. It was formally known as Sheril Mountain. Mount Sherrill is located east-southeast, and Halcott Mountain is located west-southwest of Balsam Mountain.
