= Woodland Creek =

Creek in Thurston County, Washington state

- Interactive map of Creek location
- Etymology: Early name of Lacey, Washington

Location
- Country: United States
- State: Washington
- County: Thurston County

Physical characteristics
- Mouth
  - location: Henderson Inlet
  - coordinates: 47°05′45″N 122°49′28″W

Basin features
- Landmarks: Karen Fraser Woodland Trail
- Geographic Names Information System: 1509620

Woodland Creek is a stream in Thurston County in the U.S. state of Washington. It is a tributary to Henderson Inlet.

== History ==
Woodland Creek took its name from Woodland, Washington, an early variant name of the city of Lacey, which in turn was named after Isaac Wood, an early settler.

== Recreation ==
Woodland Creek Community Park in Lacey takes its name from the stream. A pedestrian bridge spans over the creek connecting the park to the Karen Fraser Woodland Trail.

== See also ==
- List of geographic features in Thurston County, Washington
