= Kapotte Muziek =

Kapotte Muziek is the musical improvisation project of Frans de Waard, Peter Duimelinks and Roel Meelkop. Active since 1984, it is one of the most internationally visible improvisation and experimental projects hailing from the Netherlands. The group began as the solo noise music project of Frans de Waard, who published more than fifty cassettes and several LPs using this name. Duimelinks joined to make it a duo for Kapotte Muziek's first US tour, then Roel Meelkop was added later. The trio toured the US once, playing as both Kapotte Muziek and as Goem, their techno music alter ego. Currently, all Kapotte Muziek music is recorded live by the trio, while de Waard's solo work is published using a variety of aliases, such as Quest, Shifts, Modelbau and Freiband.

== Kapotte Muziek by.. ==
Several artists have been reworking pieces or live documents by Kapotte Muziek into a series of new pieces generically called Kapotte Muziek by. Here is a list of the artists involved :

- (1) RLW ( 7", 1997, Korm Plastics )
- (2) Illusion of Safety ( 7", 1997, Korm Plastics )
- (3) Lasse Marhaug ( 7", 1998, Korm Plastics )
- (4) Leif Elggren ( 7", 1998, Korm Plastics )
- (5) DMDN ( not released )
- (6) Radboud Mens ( 7", 1998, Korm Plastics )
- (7) Wiklund / Stavöstrand ( 7", 1999, Korm Plastics )
- (8) Asmus Tietchens ( 7", 2000, Korm Plastics )
- (9) Troum ( 7", 2001, Korm Plastics )
- (10) Stephan Mathieu ( CD-EP, 2003, Korm Plastics )
- (11) Toshiya Tsunoda ( CD, 2004, Korm Plastics )
- (12) Thurston Moore ( CD, 2004, Korm Plastics )
- (13) Richard Chartier / Boca Raton ( CD, 2005, Korm Plastics )
- (14) Peter Rehberg ( CD-EP, 2006, Korm Plastics )
- Freiband ( CD-R Business card, 2007, Moll )
- Five Elements Music ( CD-R, 2008, Moving Furniture Records )

== Name ==
In Dutch, Kapotte Muziek means broken music.

== See also ==
- Goem
