= East Branch Delaware River =

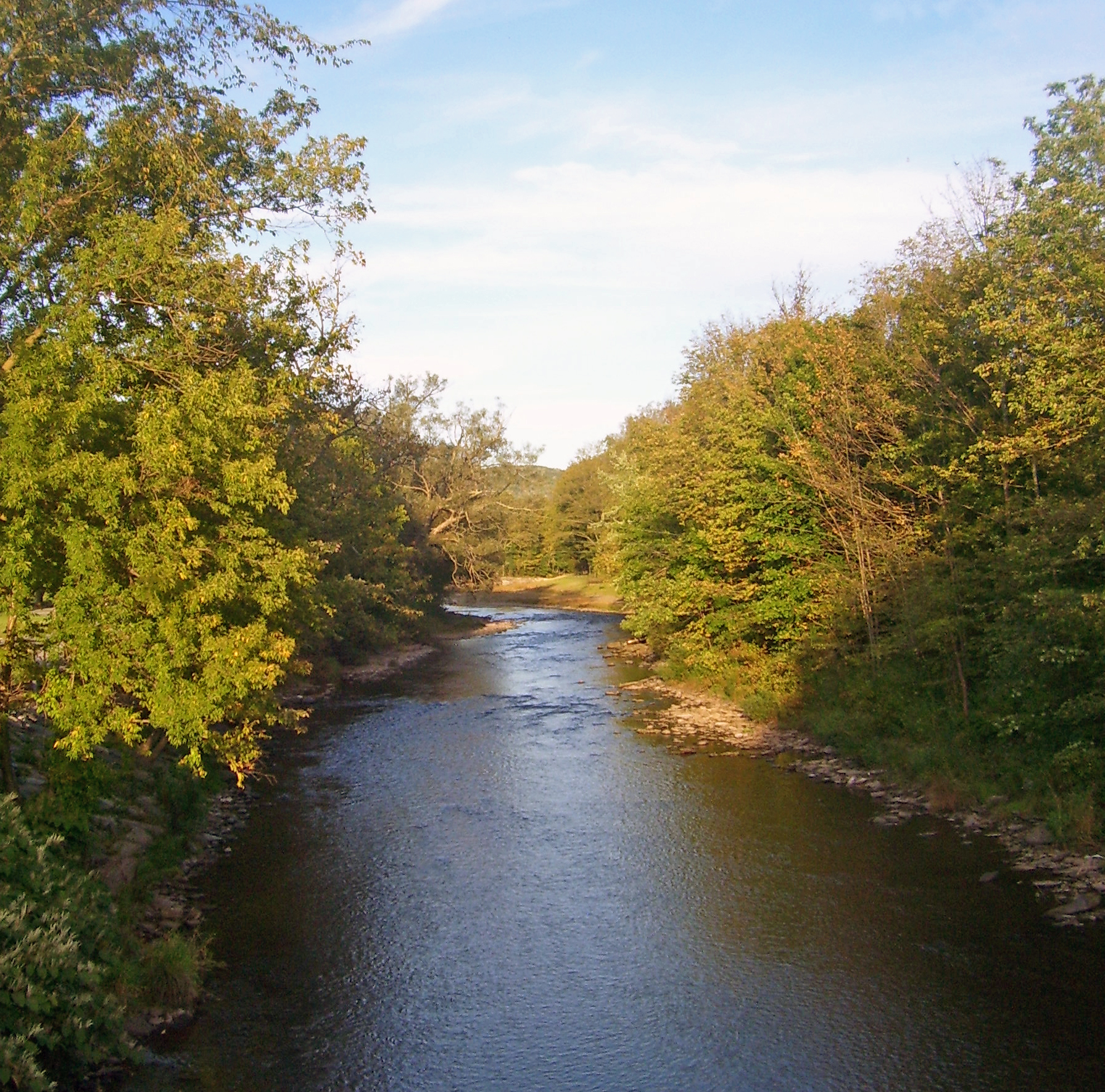
- East Branch at Margaretville, New York

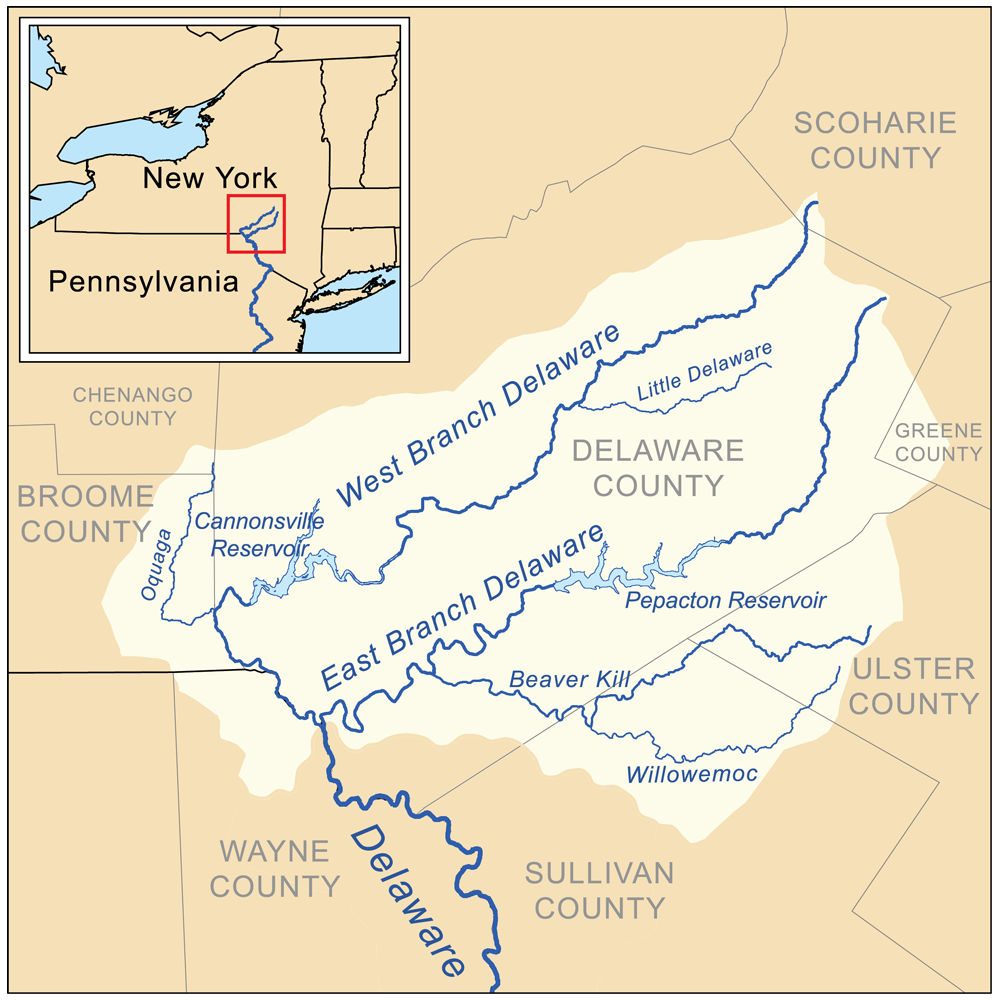

Location
- Country: United States
- State: New York
- Region: Catskills
- County: Delaware
- Towns: Roxbury, Middletown, Andes, Colchester, Hancock

Physical characteristics
- Source: Unnamed pond
  - location: SW of Grand Gorge
  - coordinates: 42°21′21″N 74°31′03″W
  - elevation: 1,560 ft (480 m)
- Mouth: Delaware River
  - location: Hancock
  - coordinates: 41°56′20″N 75°16′45″W
  - elevation: 883 ft (269 m)
- Length: 75 mi (121 km)
- Basin size: 828 mi^{2} (2,140 km^{2})
- Discharge
  - average: 1,715 cu ft/s (48.6 m^{3}/s)
  - maximum: 77,400 cu ft/s (2,190 m^{3}/s)

Basin features
- River system: Delaware River
- Tributaries
  - left: Beaver Kill, Dry Brook
  - right: Platte Kill

The East Branch Delaware River is one of two branches that form the Delaware River. It is approximately 75 mi (121 km) long, and flows through the U.S. state of New York. It winds through a mountainous area on the southwestern edge of Catskill Park in the Catskill Mountains for most of its course, before joining the West Branch along the northeast border of Pennsylvania with New York. Much of it is paralleled by State Route 30.

The river was impounded just north of Downsville in the mid-20th century to create Pepacton Reservoir, part of the New York City water supply system supplying drinking water to the city. It is a popular destination for fly fishing for brown trout.

In 1881 John Burroughs, a native of the area, published "A Summer Voyage", recounting a solo boat trip down the East Branch from Arkville to Hancock.

There are many variant names for the river that include: Papaconck, Papakonk River, Papotunk River, Pepachton River, Pepacton Branch, Popacton River, Popaxtunk Branch.

== Course ==
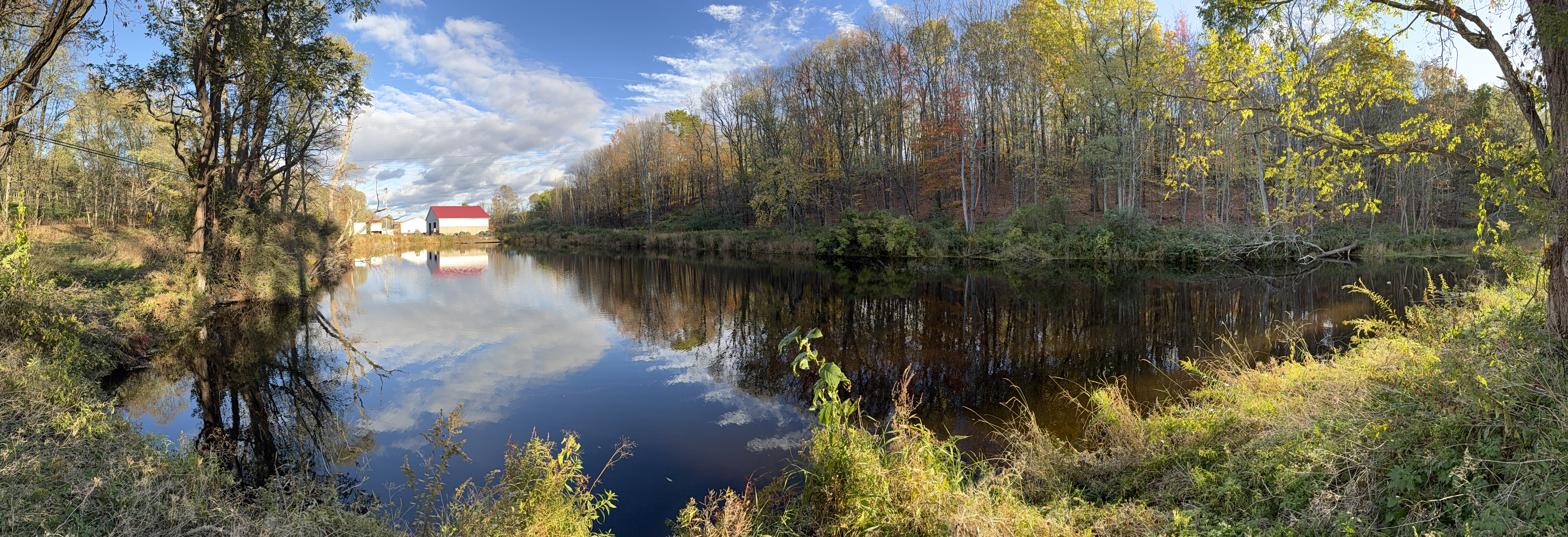
Source of the East Branch Delaware River

The East Branch Delaware River rises in eastern Delaware County, from a small pond next to a gas station on Route 30 just below the divide with the Hudson River watershed southwest of the hamlet of Grand Gorge and flows initially SSW, through the town of Roxbury. Its upper course winds through a narrow valley containing the river and Route 30. Just past the Middletown town line, the river flows through Wawaka Lake and then receives Dry Brook, whose tributaries drain the town of Halcott, the only part of Greene County in the Delaware's watershed, from the east just outside Arkville. This confluence also puts the Catskill Park Blue Line in the middle of the channel.

Route 30 remains parallel as the East Branch returns to the southwest, flowing through the small village of Margaretville, the first significant settlement along the river, where NY 28 joins Route 30. The two roads remain alongside for the next few miles as the East Branch widens into Pepacton Reservoir. A short distance from the north end of the reservoir, Route 28 leaves Route 30 at the hamlet of Dunraven cleared to make room for the reservoir.

Pepacton Reservoir continues, with the Blue Line along its north shore, carrying the river through the towns of Andes and Colchester as its course moves more to the west. Route 30 crosses it midway along its length. The Downsville Dam just north of the village of that name marks the reservoir's southern end. Below the dam and its spillway the river narrows again, to where routes 30 and 206 cross just outside the village.

It continues winding through a wider valley alongside Route 30 to East Branch, where the East Branch's most significant tributary, the Beaver Kill, a world-renowned trout stream that rises in western Ulster County, flows in from the east. Here Route 30 ends at the Route 17 expressway, slowly being converted into Interstate 86, parallels the river, crossing back and forth. At the Hancock town line, the Blue Line turns to follow it south, taking the East Branch out of the Catskill Park. A few miles below that, at the village of Hancock, it turns south and joins the West Branch to create the Delaware's main stem.

== Tributaries ==
Not including tributaries of Pepacton Reservoir

Right

- Pleasant Valley Brook
- Platte Kill
- Downs Brook
- Trout Brook
- Clauson Brook
- Baxter Brook
- Morrison Brook
- Bolton Brook
- Read Creek
- City Brook
- Cadosia Creek

Left

- Batavia Kill
- Dry Brook
- Huckleberry Brook
- Campbell Brook
- Beaver Kill
- Fish Creek
- Peas Eddy Brook
- Gee Brook

== See also ==
- List of New York rivers
- Peas Eddy Island
