= Shinhopple, New York =

- Hamlet
- Location within New York Location within the United States
- Coordinates: 42°02′19″N 75°04′04″W
- Country: United States
- State: New York
- County: Delaware
- Elevation: 1,063 ft (324 m)
- Time zone: UTC-5 (Eastern (EST))
  - Summer (DST): UTC-4 (EDT)
- Area code: 607
- GNIS feature ID: 965125

Shinhopple is a hamlet in Delaware County, New York, United States. The community is located along the East Branch Delaware River and New York State Route 30, 9.6 miles (15.4 km) south-southeast of Walton. Shinhopple had a post office until July 31, 1993.
