= List of dam removals in Massachusetts =

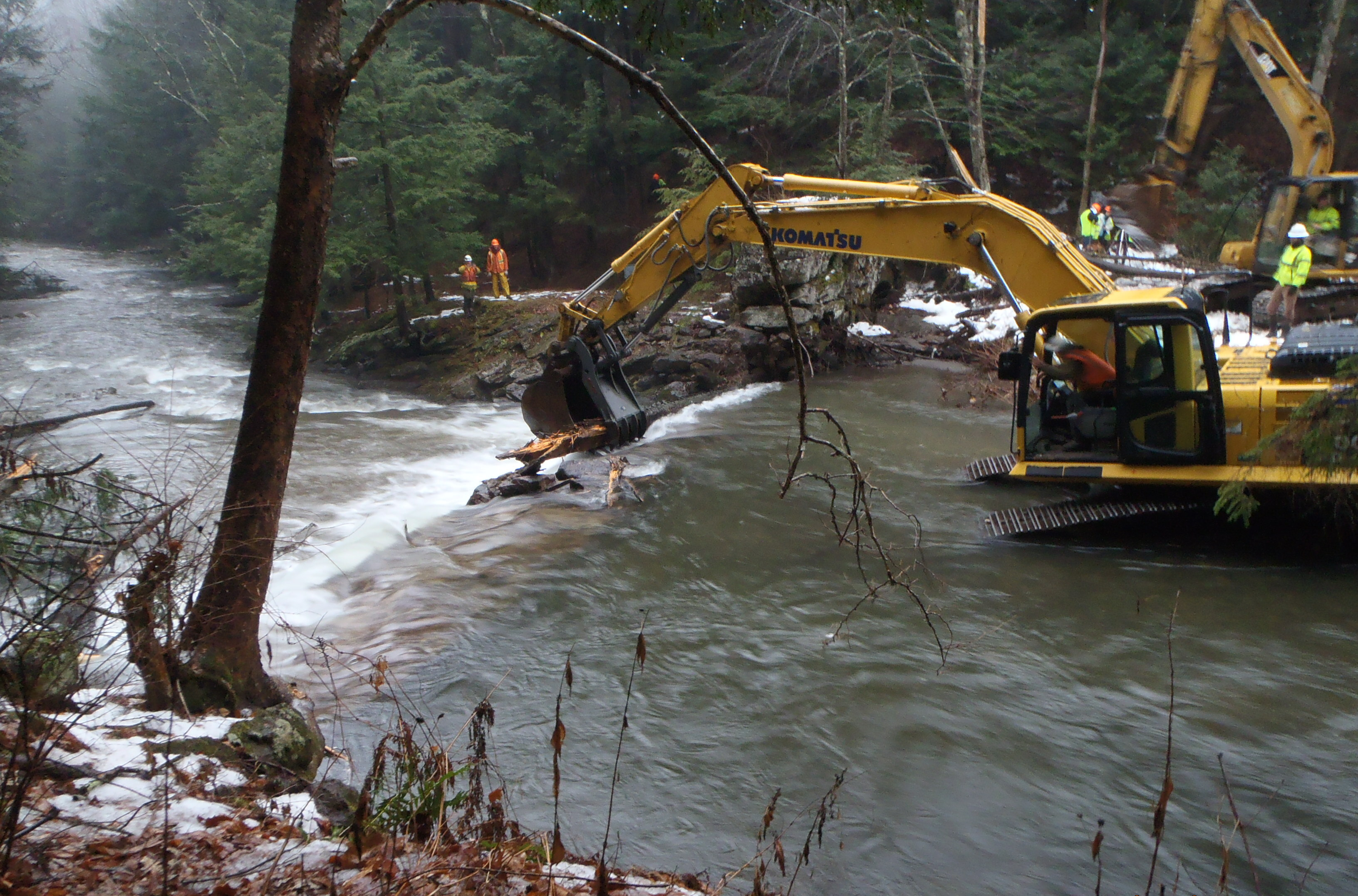
The 2014 removal of the International Paper Co. Dam No. 2 from the Fall River on the border of Greenfield and Gill.

This is a list of dams in Massachusetts that have been removed as physical impediments to free-flowing rivers or streams.

== Removals by watershed ==
=== Housatonic River ===
The Tel-Electric Dam was removed from the West Branch Housatonic River in Pittsfield in 2020. The project required safely disposing of 8,000 tons (7,300 metric tons) of sediment contaminated with polychlorinated biphenyl pollution from a General Electric plant. The project cost around $4 million and benefited an environmental justice community as defined by the Massachusetts Executive Office of Energy and Environmental Affairs.

=== South River ===
==== Proposed removals ====
The North and South Rivers Watershed Association is working with town, state, and private stakeholders on the South River Restoration Project, which will remove three dams blocking fish migration on the South River.

=== Taunton River ===
The structurally deficient High Street Dam was the most downstream barrier on the Town River to fish migrating from Narragansett Bay via the Taunton River. Its removal in 2023 opened 10 miles (16 km) of river to fish passage as well as 354 acres (143 ha) of spawning habitat in Lake Nippenicket.

=== Connecticut River ===
==== Westfield River ====
The 2014 removal of a dam from the Westfield River tributary Kinne Brook in Chester was a collaboration between Trout Unlimited, the Massachusetts Division of Ecological Restoration, the National Resources Conservation Service, the U.S. Fish and Wildlife Service, and a private landowner. It was part of a larger project to restore 10 mi (16 km) of stream, which also involved the replacement of two culverts.

==== Sam Mill River ====
Dudleyville Pond Dam on the Saw Mill River in Shutesbury underwent emergency removal in summer 2024 following an American Rivers study showing the dam was an imminent public safety risk. The Massachusetts Division of Ecological Restoration removed the dam at a cost of $118,000 within a month of the town's Conservation Commission issuing an emergency certification for its removal. The project was noted for its unusually rapid timeline.

=== Ware River ===
The Wheelwright Pond Dam removal over the Ware River in Wheelwright (Hardwick) and New Braintree occurred in 2025 to 2026. The total project cost is estimated at $4 million, mostly with State and Federal dollars. It was a collaboration between the East Quabbin Land Trust and the dam's private owner, Raitto Engineering & Manufacturing Co. This project reconnected 130 miles of high-quality freshwater habitat in the Ware River Watershed, the most continuous stream miles in Massachusetts. The dam was built in the 1800s or early 1900s, and its poor condition prompted Massachusetts to upgrade the status of the dam to a high-hazard level to public safety. It was the largest dam removal in Massachusetts. The dam removal project was made possible by East Quabbin Land Trust's purchase of the former Tanner–Hiller Airport, which is in the process of being converted into the Menameset Habitat and the Mass Central Rail Trail.

== Completed removals ==
Dam	Height	Year removed	Location	Watercourse	Watershed
Moody St. Feeder Dam	12 ft (3.7 m)				
May Brook Dam	5 to 6 ft (1.5 to 1.8 m)	2009	Windsor	May Brook	
Robbins Dike Dam	5.5 ft (1.7 m)	2006	Plymouth; 41.7665°N 70.6351°W	Red Brook	Buttermilk Bay
New Way Dam	2 ft (0.61 m)	2008	Wareham; 41.7659°N 70.6346°W	Red Brook	Buttermilk Bay
Lower Flume Dam		2009	Wareham; 41.7653°N 70.6341°W	Red Brook	Buttermilk Bay
Upper Flume Dam		2009	Wareham; 41.7653°N 70.6342°W	Red Brook	Buttermilk Bay
Beaver Dam Brook Dam	12 ft (3.7 m)	2016	Plymouth; 41.9013°N 70.5712°W	Beaver Dam Brook	Cape Cod Bay
West Beaver Dam Brook - Lower Berm	5 ft (1.5 m)	2020	Plymouth; 41.9163°N 70.5699°W	West Beaver Dam Brook	Cape Cod Bay
West Beaver Dam Brook - Upper Berm	3 ft (0.91 m)	2020	Plymouth; 41.9153°N 70.5711°W	West Beaver Dam Brook	Cape Cod Bay
Sandwich Game Farm Dam		2006	East Sandwich; 41.7311°N 70.4273°W	Mill Creek	Cape Cod Bay
Curtis Pond Dam		2012	Middleton; 42.6183°N 71.0039°W	Boston Brook	Charles River
Lower Dam	8 ft (2.4 m)	2009	Rowley; 42.74°N 70.8881°W	Ox Pasture Brook	Charles River
Traphole Brook Dam	8 ft (2.4 m)	2022	Norwood; 42.1606°N 71.1942°W	Traphole Brook	Charles River
Charles River Mill Dam (Pearl Street Mill Dam)	13.5 ft (4.1 m)	2017	Bellingham; 42.1307°N 71.4447°W	Charles River	Charles River
Upper Cook's Canyon Dam	9.5 ft (2.9 m)	2006	Barre; 42.4145°N 72.1066°W	Galloway Brook	Chicopee River
Falmouth Rod & Gun Club Dam	10 ft (3.0 m)	2021	Falmouth; 41.5933°N 70.5249°W	Childs River	Childs River
Coonamessett Lower Bog Dam		2017	Falmouth; 41.5819°N 70.5734°W	Coonamessett River	Coonamessett River
Coonamessett River Lower Dam	6 ft (1.8 m)	2018	Falmouth; 41.5853°N 70.5726°W	Coonamessett River	Coonamessett River
Middle Bog Dam	6 ft (1.8 m)	2020	Falmouth; 41.5853°N 70.5726°W	Coonamessett River	Coonamessett River
International Paper Co. Dam No. 2	10 ft (3.0 m)	2014	Greenfield and Gill; 42.6255°N 72.5488°W	Fall River	Fall River
Bartlett Rod Shop Co. Dam	20 ft (6.1 m)	2012	Pelham; 42.379°N 72.4722°W	Amethyst Brook	Fort River
Timber Dam	5 ft (1.5 m)	2016	Pelham; 42.3794°N 72.471°W	Amethyst Brook	Fort River
Hall Brook Dam		2009	Adams; 42.6243°N 73.1241°W	Hoxie Brook	Hoosic River
Briggsville Dam	15 ft (4.6 m)	2010	Clarksburg; 42.7147°N 73.083°W	North Branch Hoosic River	Hoosic River
Thunder Brook Restoration Project	15 ft (4.6 m)	2012	Cheshire; 42.5649°N 73.1768°W	Thunder Brook	Hoosic River
Lower Hathaway Brook Dam		2010	Dalton; 42.4215°N 73.186°W	Hathaway Brook	Housatonic River
Upper Hathaway Brook Dam		2010	Dalton; 42.4204°N 73.1854°W	Hathaway Brook	Housatonic River
Old Berkshire Mill Dam		2000	Dalton; 42.4706°N 73.1691°W	Housatonic River	Housatonic River
Gravesleigh Pond Dam	6 ft (1.8 m)	2013	Pittsfield; 42.4295°N 73.2365°W	Sackett Brook	Housatonic River
Tel-Electric Dam	22 ft (6.7 m)	2020	Pittsfield; 42.4471°N 73.2638°W	West Branch Housatonic River	Housatonic River
Lyman Pond Dam	12 ft (3.7 m)	2022	Southampton; 42.2174°N 72.7303°W	Manhan River	Manhan River
Mordecai Lincoln Road Pond Dam (Hunters Pond Dam)	11 ft (3.4 m)	2017	Scituate; 42.2231°N 70.7887°W	Bound Brook	Massachusetts Bay
Balmoral Dam	6 ft (1.8 m)	2017	Andover; 42.6724°N 71.1494°W	Shawsheen River	Merrimack River
Marland Place Dam (Stevens Street Dam)	12 ft (3.7 m)	2017	Andover; 42.6623°N 71.1468°W	Shawsheen River	Merrimack River
Roberts Meadow Upper Reservoir Dam	30 ft (9.1 m)	2018	Northampton; 42.338°N 72.7279°W	Roberts Meadow Brook	Mill River
Phillipston Reservoir Dam #1	15 ft (4.6 m)	2012	Phillipston; 42.5789°N 72.1752°W	Thousand Acre Brook	Millers River
Phillipston Reservoir Dam #2	8 ft (2.4 m)	2012	Phillipston; 42.5784°N 72.1735°W	Thousand Acre Brook	Millers River
Whites Mill Pond Dam		2023	Winchendon; 42.6940°N 72.0121°W	Tributary to North Branch Millers River	Millers River
Carding Mill Dam	8 ft (2.4 m)	2014	Harwich; 41.6709°N 70.062°W	Cold River	Nantucket Sound
Gulf Brook Dam	10 ft (3.0 m)	2021	Pepperell; 42.6991°N 71.6352°W	Gulf Brook	Nashua River
Millie Turner Dam	10 ft (3.0 m)	2015	Pepperell; 42.6748°N 71.5818°W	Nissitissit River	Nashua River
Sucker Brook Dam	7 ft (2.1 m)	2021	Pepperell; 42.6839°N 71.6096°W	Sucker Brook	Nashua River
Bartlett Pond Dam		2014	Lancaster; 42.4883°N 71.7141°W	Wekepeke Brook	Nashua River
Mill Pond Dam	5 to 9 ft (1.5 to 2.7 m)	2014	Hanover; 42.1397°N 70.8355°W	Third Herring Brook	North River
Tack Factory Dam	10 ft (3.0 m)	2016	Hanover; 42.1227°N 70.9082°W	Third Herring Brook	North River
Unnamed Low Head Dams	3 ft (0.91 m)	2022	Hanover; 42.1466°N 70.8388°W	Third Herring Brook	North River
Peterson Pond Dam	10 ft (3.0 m)	2020	Hanover and Norwell; 42.1437°N 70.8376°W	Third Herring Brook	North River
Eel River Headwaters Restoration (7 small dams)	8 ft (2.4 m)	2009	Plymouth	Eel River	Plymouth Bay
Sawmill Pond Dam	12 ft (3.7 m)	2010	Plymouth; 41.9113°N 70.6408°W	Eel River	Plymouth Bay
Wapping Road Dam	6.6 ft (2.0 m)	2011	Kingston; 41.9929°N 70.7484°W	Jones River	Plymouth Bay
Elm Street Dam	9 ft (2.7 m)	2019	Kingston; 41.99°N 70.73°W	Jones River	Plymouth Bay
Billington Street Dam		2002	Plymouth; 41.9508°N 70.6731°W	Town Brook	Plymouth Bay
Off Billington Street Dam	8.4 ft (2.6 m)	2013	Plymouth; 41.949°N 70.6741°W	Town Brook	Plymouth Bay
Plymco Dam	16 ft (4.9 m)	2015	Plymouth; 41.9465°N 70.6739°W	Town Brook	Plymouth Bay
Holmes Dam	19 ft (5.8 m)	2018	Plymouth; 41.9525°N 70.6687°W	Town Brook	Plymouth Bay
Wellingsly Dam #1	3 to 5 ft (0.91 to 1.52 m)	2012	Plymouth; 41.949°N 70.6534°W	Wellingsly Brook	Plymouth Bay
Wellingsly Dam #2	3 to 5 ft (0.91 to 1.52 m)	2012	Plymouth; 41.949°N 70.6534°W	Wellingsly Brook	Plymouth Bay
Wellingsly Dam #3	3 to 5 ft (0.91 to 1.52 m)	2012	Plymouth; 41.949°N 70.6534°W	Wellingsly Brook	Plymouth Bay
Hamant Brook Lower Pond Dam	10 ft (3.0 m)	2017	Old Sturbridge Village; Sturbridge; 42.0977°N 72.0918°W	Hamant Brook	Quinebaug River
Hamant Brook Middle Pond Dam	13 ft (4.0 m)	2017	Sturbridge; 42.095°N 72.0946°W	Hamant Brook	Quinebaug River
Hamant Brook Upper Pond Dam	11 ft (3.4 m)	2017	Sturbridge; 42.0928°N 72.0955°W	Hamant Brook	Quinebaug River
Dudleyville Pond Dam (Brown's Dam)		2024	Shutesbury; 42.4850°N 72.4444°W	Sawmill River	Sawmill River
Forge Pond Dam		2010	Freetown; 41.8028°N 71.0523°W	Assonet River	Taunton River
Bleachery Dam (Rattlesnake Brook Dam)	7 ft (2.1 m)	2016	Freetown; 41.7811°N 71.0864°W	Assonet River	Taunton River
West Street Dam	12 ft (3.7 m)	2022	Foxborough; 42.0384°N 71.275°W	Cocasset River	Taunton River
Barstowe's Pond Dam	8.5 ft (2.6 m)	2018	Taunton; 41.8823°N 71.0485°W	Cotley River	Taunton River
Hopewell Mills Dam	8 ft (2.4 m)	2012	Taunton; 41.9147°N 71.0969°W	Mill River	Taunton River
Whittenton Dam	8 ft (2.4 m)	2013	Taunton; 41.9243°N 71.1063°W	Mill River	Taunton River
West Britannia Dam	8 ft (2.4 m)	2018	Taunton; 41.919°N 71.1015°W	Mill River	Taunton River
Carver Cotton Gin Pond Dam	15 ft (4.6 m)	2017	East Bridgewater; 42.0214°N 70.951°W	Satucket River	Taunton River
High Street Dam	12.5 ft (3.8 m)	2023	Bridgewater; 42.0025°N 70.9822°W	Town River	Taunton River
Wheelwright Pond Dam	12 ft (3.7 m)	2026	New Braintree 42.3524°N 72.1369°W	Ware River	Ware River
Kinne Brook Dam (Stroud Dam)	6 ft (1.8 m)	2014	Chester; 42.3085°N 72.9078°W	Kinne Brook	Westfield River
Winchell Dam	14.5 ft (4.4 m)	2016	Granville; 42.0838°N 72.8421°W	Westfield River	Westfield River
Silk Mill Dam	15 ft (4.6 m)	2003	Becket; 42.3283°N 73.0836°W	Yokum Brook	Westfield River
Ballou Dam	10 ft (3.0 m)	2006	Becket; 42.3319°N 73.0834°W	Yokum Brook	Westfield River
Horseshoe Pond Dam	6 ft (1.8 m)	2020	Wareham; 41.7653°N 70.7476°W	Weweantic River	Weweantic River
Lyman Pond Dam No. 2		2024	Waltham	Chester Brook	
Quinapoxet Accretion Dam		2024	West Boylston	Quinapoxet River	
Becker Pond Dam		2025	Mt. Washington		

== Planned and proposed removals ==
Dam	Expected year	Location	Watercourse	Watershed
Talbot Mills Dam		Billerica; 42.5918°N 71.2840°W	Concord River	Merrimack River
Veterans Memorial Park Dam		Marshfield; 42.0948°N 70.7185°W	South River	Massachusetts Bay
Chandler Pond Dam		Marshfield; 42.0926°N 70.7229°W	South River	Massachusetts Bay
Temple Street Dam		Duxbury; 42.0794°N 70.7457°W	South River	Massachusetts Bay
