= Tompkins Falls =

- Location within New York
- Location: Delaware County, New York
- Coordinates: 42°04′31″N 74°45′54″W
- Elevation: 1,489 ft (454 m)
- Watercourse: Barkaboom Stream

Tompkins Falls is a waterfall in Delaware County, New York. It is located southwest of Arena on Barkaboom Stream.
