= Deerlick Brook =

- Location of the mouth of Deerlick Brook in New York Deerlick Brook (the United States)

Location
- Country: United States
- State: New York
- County: Delaware

Physical characteristics
- Source
  - coordinates: 42°04′40″N 74°43′38″W
- Mouth: Barkaboom Stream
  - coordinates: 42°04′23″N 74°45′38″W
  - elevation: 1,539 ft (469 m)

Deerlick Brook is a river in Delaware County in New York. It flows into Barkaboom Stream southwest of Arena.
