= D&E =

D&E may refer to:

- Davis & Elkins College, a small liberal arts college in West Virginia
- Delaware and Eastern Railroad, which later became the Delaware and Northern Railroad
- De Queen and Eastern Railroad
- Dilation and evacuation, a surgical procedure
- The Design and Evolution of C++, a book about the history of the C++ programming language
- Super Junior-D&E, South Korean boy band
