= Andes station =

- Delaware and Northern Railroad Station
- U.S. National Register of Historic Places
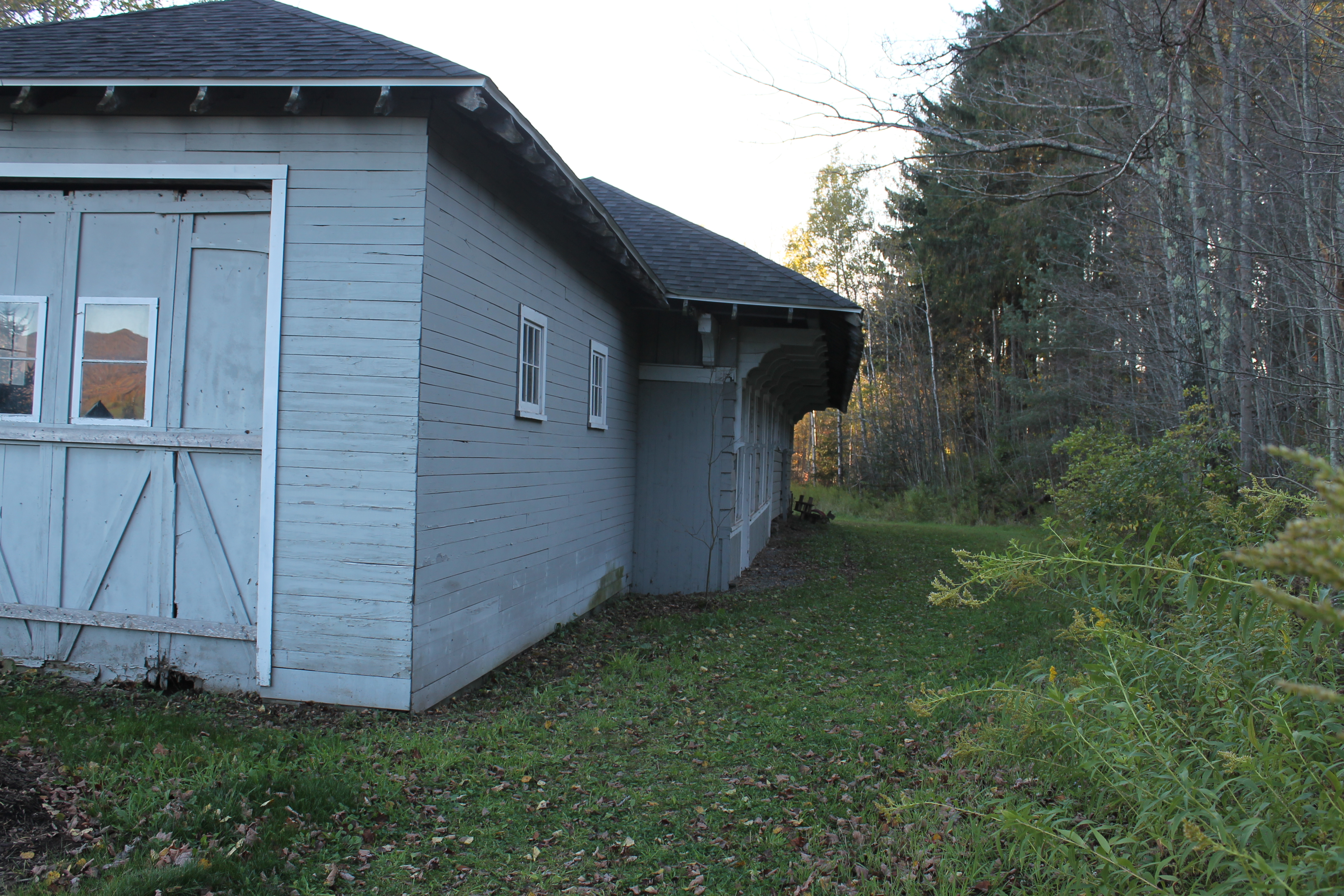
- Andes station

- Location within New York Location within the United States
- Location: Cabin Hill Rd., Andes, New York
- Coordinates: 42°11′14″N 74°47′21″W
- Area: less than one acre
- Built: 1907
- NRHP reference No.: 04000872
- Added to NRHP: August 20, 2004

Andes station, branch MP 8.45, was the busiest railroad station on the Delaware and Northern's Andes Branch, serving the bustling Village of Andes, and was also at the branch's northern terminus. It was fully erected, including minor details, in 1907, a year after the branch opened up.

The station was abandoned when the Delaware & Northern abandoned the Andes branch in 1925, and was left to a poor fate. It was then purchased by the Decker family for their lumber, hardware and feed store and was used to store inventory. The Decker family donated the depot building and property to the Town of Andes. It has been restored by the town and now houses an auditorium type space to be used to show historical movies and programming.

It was listed on the National Register of Historic Places in 2004 as the Delaware and Northern Railroad Station.

The Depot building is a few steps away from the trailhead of the Andes Rail Trail.
