= Flynn Brook =

- Location of the mouth of Flynn Brook in New York Flynn Brook (the United States)

Location
- Country: United States
- State: New York
- County: Delaware

Physical characteristics
- Source
  - coordinates: 42°06′21″N 74°52′06″W
- Mouth: Pepacton Reservoir
  - coordinates: 42°05′36″N 74°52′28″W
  - elevation: 1,280 ft (390 m)

Flynn Brook is a river in Delaware County in New York. It flows into the Pepacton Reservoir east of Downsville.
