= Bryden Hill =

Mountain in United States of America

- Location within New York Location within the United States

Highest point
- Elevation: 2,487 feet (758 m)
- Coordinates: 42°07′45″N 74°55′38″W

Geography
- Location: Downsville, New York, U.S.
- Topo map: USGS Hamden

Bryden Hill is a mountain located in the Catskill Mountains of New York northeast of Downsville. Conklin Hill is located south, and Renard Hill is located southwest of Bryden Hill.
