= Walter J. Lunn =

American politician

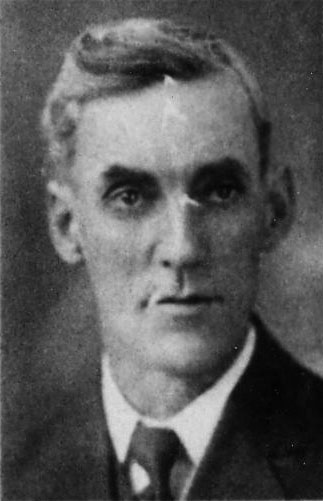
- Lunn in 1917

Member of the Washington House of Representatives for the 40th district
- In office 1915–1921

Member of the Washington State Senate for the 30th district
- In office 1923–1935

Personal details
- Born: September 6, 1867 Andes, New York, United States
- Died: May 17, 1947 (aged 79) King County, Washington, United States
- Party: Republican

Walter J. Lunn (September 6, 1867 – May 17, 1947) was an American politician in the state of Washington. He served in the Washington House of Representatives and Washington State Senate.
