= Murphy Hill Brook =

- Location of the mouth of Murphy Hill Brook in New York Murphy Hill Brook (the United States)

Location
- Country: United States
- State: New York
- County: Delaware

Physical characteristics
- Source
  - coordinates: 42°07′44″N 74°51′57″W
- Mouth: Pepacton Reservoir
  - coordinates: 42°06′08″N 74°53′56″W
  - elevation: 1,280 ft (390 m)

Murphy Hill Brook is a river in Delaware County in New York. It flows into the Pepacton Reservoir east-northeast of Downsville.
