= Mill Brook (Pepacton Reservoir tributary) =

Location
- Country: United States
- State: New York
- Counties: Delaware, Ulster

Physical characteristics
- Source
  - coordinates: 42°02′59″N 74°35′27″W
- Mouth: Pepacton Reservoir
  - coordinates: 42°06′58″N 74°44′46″W
  - elevation: 1,280 ft (390 m)

Mill Brook is a river in Delaware County and Ulster County in New York. It flows into the Pepacton Reservoir west of Arena.
