= The Sea of Trees =

2015 American drama mystery film by Gus Van Sant

- Theatrical release poster
- Directed by: Gus Van Sant
- Written by: Chris Sparling
- Produced by: Gil Netter; Ken Kao; Kevin Halloran; F. Gary Gray; E. Brian Dobbins; Allen Fischer; Chris Sparling
- Starring: Matthew McConaughey; Ken Watanabe; Naomi Watts
- Cinematography: Kasper Tuxen
- Edited by: Pietro Scalia
- Music by: Mason Bates
- Production companies: Bloom; Gil Netter Productions; Waypoint Entertainment
- Distributed by: A24
- Release dates: May 16, 2015 (Cannes); August 26, 2016 (United States)
- Running time: 110 minutes
- Country: United States
- Languages: English; Japanese
- Budget: $25 million
- Box office: $906,995

The Sea of Trees is a 2015 American drama mystery film directed by Gus Van Sant and written by Chris Sparling. The film stars Matthew McConaughey, Ken Watanabe, Naomi Watts, Katie Aselton and Jordan Gavaris.

The film is about an American man who attempts suicide in Aokigahara, an infamous suicide hotspot in Japan, where he meets a Japanese man who is there for the same reason. Principal photography began on July 28, 2014, in Foxborough, Massachusetts; the production moved to Japan in September of the same year. It was selected to compete for the Palme d'Or at the 2015 Cannes Film Festival.

The film was released on August 26, 2016, by A24. It received negative reviews from critics and was a box office bomb, grossing mere $825,577 on a $25 million budget.

== Plot ==
Arthur Brennan, an adjunct physics professor, travels to Aokigahara ("The Suicide Forest") with a sealed package. Once there, he attempts to end his life via drug overdose but encounters a Japanese man named Takumi Nakamura. Takumi entered the forest two days prior and slit his wrists because he was demoted at work, but soon realized he would miss his wife and daughter. Since then, he has tried to escape the dense sea of trees but cannot find the trail back. Arthur decides to help but the two end up disoriented and lost. To keep their minds occupied, they share details about their lives, including the names of Takumi's wife and daughter: "Kiiro" and "Fuyu".

Through flashbacks, it is revealed that Arthur lived in a crumbling marriage alongside his wife Joan, a real estate agent. Joan resented Arthur for his affair with Gabriella, his coworker, and always putting his own needs before their needs as a couple. Arthur despised Joan's alcoholism and constant need to demean him for earning less money than her. One night, Joan suffers a heavy nosebleed after a vicious argument. They go to the hospital, where she is diagnosed with a brain tumor. Joan and Arthur slowly rekindle their love for each other. After her surgery, they reminisce about trips to their lake house where Joan would spend hours walking amongst the orchids. He says he will take her there when she is fully recovered.

Joan is transported to a recovery hospital. Arthur follows behind the ambulance in his car while talking to her on the phone. He jokes about not knowing what her favorite color or season is. Before Joan can respond, a truck plows into the ambulance, killing her. At her funeral, Arthur tells the funeral director he did not really know her even after being married for years. The director replies he overheard one of Joan's sisters saying she mailed a copy of Joan's favorite book to Arthur's house.

Back in the present, Arthur and Takumi struggle to escape the forest. They survive falls, a flash flood, dehydration, and hypothermia over the course of a single night. Along the way, they encounter the bodies of others who succeeded in ending their lives. They take refuge in a tent with a corpse who brought emergency supplies with him. Sitting by a campfire, Arthur tells Takumi he is in the forest because of his guilt over how he and Joan treated each other.

The next morning, Arthur leaves an ill Takumi by the tent to try and find help. He promises Takumi he will come back for him. Arthur uses the walkie-talkie from the deceased camper and makes contact with the park rangers. He tries to help but is too weak to inform them that Takumi is still in the forest.

12 days later, Arthur is being evaluated by a hospital psychiatrist before his release. His plans are to return to the forest and find Takumi; the psychiatrist informs him that the rangers found the tent he spoke of but did not find anyone there. She also claims that there is no one by the name of Takumi Nakamura who has a wife and daughter with the names Takumi mentioned, and that the camera at the entrance to the park only shows Arthur entering the forest.

Arthur returns to the forest and finds the unopened package he left behind when he first found Takumi. Arthur locates the tent and coat he used to cover Takumi for warmth but finds a beautiful orchid in Takumi's place. He remembers Takumi describing the forest as a form of purgatory, where the spirits of your loved ones are closest during your darkest moments. He opens the package containing Joan's favorite book: a copy of Hansel and Gretel. Arthur realizes that Takumi was Joan's spirit and is helping him heal his guilt.

Arthur returns to the United States and brings the orchid with him. During office hours, Arthur's student Eric reveals that the names of Takumi's wife and daughter are not names but words that mean "yellow" and "winter". Arthur remembers the last conversation he had with his wife about her favorite color and season. He travels to the lake house and plants the orchid in Joan's garden.

== Cast ==
- Matthew McConaughey as Arthur Brennan, Joan’s husband
- Ken Watanabe as Takumi Nakamura
- Naomi Watts as Joan Brennan, Arthur’s wife
- Katie Aselton as Gabriella Laforte, a woman who had an affair with Arthur.
- Jordan Gavaris as Eric
- Bruce Norris as Dr. Howerton

== Production ==
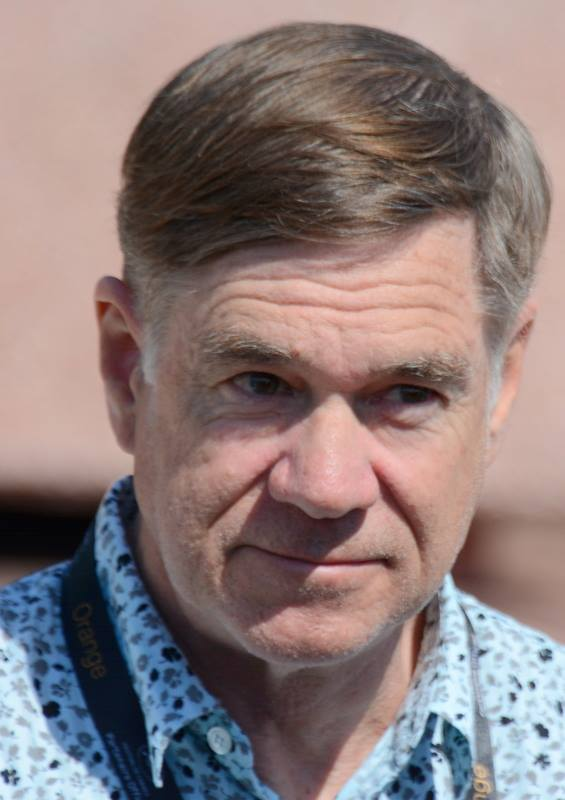
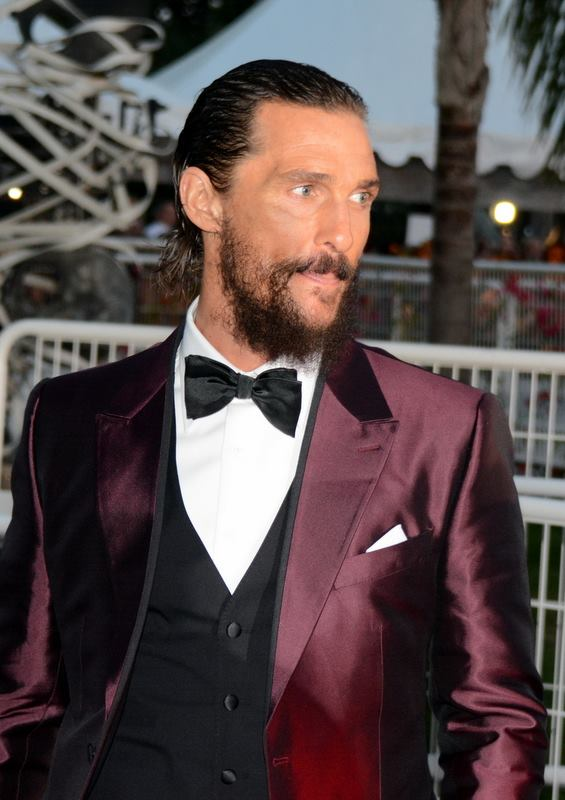
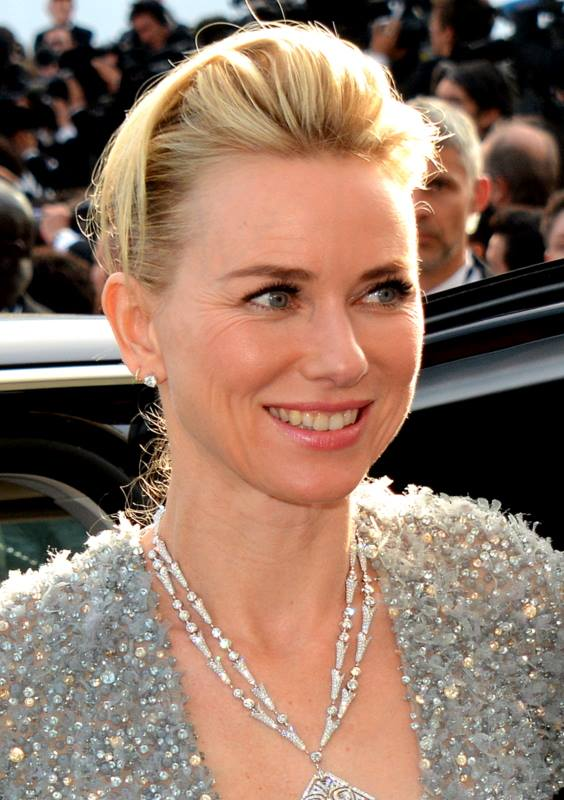
Director Gus Van Sant, and stars Matthew McConaughey and Naomi Watts at the 2015 Cannes Film Festival.

The project was first announced in December 2013. Matthew McConaughey joined the cast in February 2014 with Naomi Watts joining in May of that year The film's international distribution was sold to different companies at 2014 Cannes Film Festival, which includes Entertainment One to handle the rights for UK, Australia and New Zealand, and Sony Pictures Worldwide Acquisitions to handle for Eastern Europe, Pan-Latin America and Scandinavia. On August 15, Katie Aselton joined the cast to play a woman who has an affair with McConaughey's character.

=== Filming ===
On May 15, 2014, McConaughey and Van Sant talked about the upcoming film which was officially slated to start on July 15, Van Sant said, "My latest feelings is to try to shoot in Japan, if it's too difficult, we would probably go to the northwest in the States, where the land is very similar." The film's budget was set at $25 million with McConaughey receiving a $3.5 million salary.

The principal photography of the film began on July 28, 2014, in Foxborough, Massachusetts. The crews were filming deep in the woods in the Purgatory Chasm, Sutton, Massachusetts, where they were also using the recreation hall and chapel at Cocasset River Recreation Area, which they scheduled to rent again on August 14. Publicist Gregg Brilliant said, "The film makers looked at about half a dozen places around the country. The story takes place in Japan and the Northeast United States, and we chose Massachusetts. It's a beautiful location."

Shooting began in Massachusetts through September, after which filming moved to Japan. The filming wrapped-up on September 30, 2014, in Massachusetts and Japan, with post-production beginning in Los Angeles.

== Release ==
The film had its world premiere at the 2015 Cannes Film Festival on May 16, 2015. Prior to, Roadside Attractions and Lionsgate acquired U.S distribution rights to the film. A24 later acquired distribution rights, after Roadside and Lionsgate dropped the film for unknown reasons. The film was released in a limited release and through video on demand on August 26, 2016.

== Reception ==
The Sea of Trees received negative reviews from critics. On Rotten Tomatoes, the film holds a rating of 19%, based on 53 reviews, with an average rating of 4/10. The consensus states, "Dull, maudlin, and fundamentally empty, The Sea of Trees extinguishes the contributions of a talented cast and marks a depressing low point in director Gus Van Sant's career." On Metacritic the film has a score of 23 out of 100 score, based on 18 critics, indicating "generally unfavorable reviews".

At its May 2015 debut at the Cannes Film Festival, the film was met with harsh critical reception; it was loudly booed and laughed at by an audience of critics, with critic Scott Foundas calling it a film "for nobody." Some critics were more impressed by the film; Pete Hammond wrote "Their film deserves a better fate" and he praised its "pared sentimentality." While Hammond was also impressed with the "beautiful lush score", others found it "cloying" and "ever-present."

Critic Richard Mowe stated this audience reaction should "give the film’s creative team pause for reflection about exactly where they went so badly awry." Justin Chang, chief film critic for Variety, deemed the film "dramatically stillborn, commercially unpromising", though Chang did single out the film's aesthetic as noteworthy, stating "Cinematographer Kasper Tuxen works wonders with the forest's softly diffused light by day, and makes exquisite use of a campfire to illuminate McConaughey's and Watanabe's faces at night." He also described co-star Naomi Watts as "solidly moving and sometimes awesomely passive-aggressive." Nonetheless, he concludes that the film is, "Almost impressive in the way it shifts from dreary two-hander to so-so survival thriller to terminal-illness weepie to M. Night Shyamalan/Nicholas Sparks-level spiritual hokum, this risibly long-winded drama is perhaps above all a profound cultural insult, milking the lush green scenery of Japan's famous Aokigahara forest for all it's worth, while giving co-lead Ken Watanabe little to do other than moan in agony, mutter cryptically, and generally try to act as though McConaughey's every word isn't boring him (pardon the expression) to death."

Further critical dissatisfaction with the film has been attributed to the fact that "the twists and turns of this narrative fail to ring true with too many implausibilities in the plotting to give any credibility" and with its "complete lack of narrative momentum, it all adds up to a film that's easily Van Sant's worst, and is a sad black mark on McConaughey's mostly excellent recent run. Ultimately, "Sea of Trees" feels like an entirely appropriate title: it makes you feel like you're drowning, and it's full of sap."

== See also ==
- The Forest
