= Liddle Brook =

- Location of the mouth of Liddle Brook in New York Liddle Brook (the United States)

Location
- Country: United States
- State: New York
- County: Delaware

Physical characteristics
- Source
  - coordinates: 42°13′29″N 74°47′13″W
- Mouth: Tremper Kill
  - coordinates: 42°11′20″N 74°47′14″W
  - elevation: 1,594 ft (486 m)

Liddle Brook is a river in Delaware County in New York. It flows into Tremper Kill in Andes.
