= Laurel Lake (New York) =

Lake in Delaware County, New York, United States

- Location of Laurel Lake within New York
- Location: Delaware County, New York
- Coordinates: 42°05′38″N 74°46′27″W
- Surface elevation: 1,611 feet (491 m)
- Settlements: Arena

Laurel Lake also known as Mud Lake is a small lake southwest of Arena in Delaware County, New York. It drains northwest via an unnamed creek that flows into the Pepacton Reservoir.

== See also ==
- List of lakes in New York
