= Tremper Kill =

- Location of the mouth of Tremper Kill in New York Tremper Kill (the United States)

Location
- Country: United States
- State: New York
- County: Delaware

Physical characteristics
- Source
  - coordinates: 42°12′49″N 74°44′30″W
- Mouth: Pepacton Reservoir
  - coordinates: 42°05′44″N 74°49′45″W
  - elevation: 1,280 ft (390 m)

Basin features
- Tributaries
  - right: Liddle Brook

Tremper Kill is a river in Delaware County in New York. It flows into the Pepacton Reservoir west of Arena.
