= Mud Lake (New York) =

There are over 30 lakes named Mud Lake within the U.S. state of New York.

- Mud Lake, Chautauqua County, New York. 42°21′15″N 79°19′00″W
- Laurel Lake, also known as Mud Lake, Delaware County, New York. 42°05′38″N 74°46′27″W
- Mud Lake, Delaware County, New York. 42°26′56″N 74°51′59″W
- Mud Lake, Delaware County, New York. 42°27′32″N 74°48′24″W
- Mud Lake, Delaware County, New York. 42°28′32″N 74°55′39″W
- Mud Pond, also known as Mud Lake, Franklin County, New York. 44°32′11″N 74°05′48″W
- Mud Lake, Fulton County, New York. 43°05′17″N 74°25′03″W
- Mud Lake, Fulton County, New York. 43°10′21″N 74°31′38″W
- Mud Lake, Fulton County, New York. 43°12′46″N 74°13′49″W
- Mud Lake, Fulton County, New York. 43°13′32″N 74°22′00″W
- Mud Lake, Hamilton County, New York. 43°20′27″N 74°27′08″W
- Mud Lake, Hamilton County, New York. 43°22′47″N 74°31′15″W
- Mud Lake, Hamilton County, New York. 43°29′28″N 74°29′48″W
- Mud Lake, Hamilton County, New York. 43°31′08″N 74°25′47″W
- Mud Lake, Hamilton County, New York. 43°35′38″N 74°36′39″W
- Mud Lake, Herkimer County, New York. 42°54′15″N 74°54′05″W
- Mud Lake, Herkimer County, New York. 43°17′26″N 74°47′49″W
- Mud Lake, Herkimer County, New York. 43°53′46″N 74°58′09″W
- Clear Lake, also known as Mud Lake, Jefferson County, New York. 44°16′40″N 75°49′35″W
- Mud Lake, Jefferson County, New York. 44°17′31″N 75°48′37″W
- Mud Lake, Lewis County, New York. 43°28′57″N 75°31′53″W
- Mud Lake, Onondaga County, New York. 43°10′51″N 76°24′35″W
- Mud Lake, Otsego County, New York. Otsego County, New York. 42°43′02″N 74°59′25″W
- Mud Lake, Putnam County, New York. 41°25′24″N 73°50′35″W
- Mud Lake, Rensselaer County, New York. 42°37′10″N 73°36′33″W
- Mud Lake, Schoharie County, New York. 42°35′57″N 74°36′55″W
- Lamoka Lake, also known as Mud Lake, Schuyler County, New York. 42°24′23″N 77°04′41″W
- Mud Lake, St. Lawrence County, New York. 44°22′11″N 75°36′01″W
- Mud Lake, St. Lawrence County, New York. 44°30′15″N 75°27′31″W
- Mud Lake, Steuben County, New York. 42°28′13″N 77°33′43″W
- Mud Lake, Steuben County, New York. 42°29′30″N 77°16′46″W
- Harrisburg Lake, also known as Mud Lake, Warren County, New York. 43°24′30″N 74°04′48″W
