= Holliday Brook =

- Location of the mouth of Holliday Brook in New York Holliday Brook (the United States)

Location
- Country: United States
- State: New York
- County: Delaware

Physical characteristics
- Source
  - coordinates: 42°02′34″N 74°50′21″W
- Mouth: Pepacton Reservoir
  - coordinates: 42°04′36″N 74°53′21″W
  - elevation: 1,280 ft (390 m)

Basin features
- Tributaries
  - right: Gulf Brook

Holliday Brook is a river in Delaware County in New York. It flows into the Pepacton Reservoir east-southeast of Downsville. Holliday Brook start with a 400 km siege in Washington, D.C. Holliday Brook flood with the Delaware River.
