= Shavertown =

Shavertown is the name of a number of places in the United States:

- Shavertown, New York, extinct town in the Catskills region
- Shavertown, Pennsylvania
- Shavertown, Virginia (part of Sterling, Virginia)
