= Bryden Hill Brook =

- Location of the mouth of Bryden Hill Brook in New York Bryden Hill Brook (the United States)

Location
- Country: United States
- State: New York
- County: Delaware

Physical characteristics
- Source
  - coordinates: 42°08′04″N 74°55′17″W
- Mouth: Pepacton Reservoir
  - coordinates: 42°06′53″N 74°53′55″W
  - elevation: 1,280 ft (390 m)

Bryden Hill Brook is a river in Delaware County in New York. It flows into the Pepacton Reservoir east-northeast of Downsville.
