= Bush Kill (Pepacton Reservoir tributary) =

- Location of the mouth of Bush Kill in New York Bush Kill (Pepacton Reservoir tributary) (the United States)

Location
- Country: United States
- State: New York
- County: Delaware

Physical characteristics
- Source
  - coordinates: 42°09′20″N 74°31′49″W
- Mouth: Pepacton Reservoir
  - coordinates: 42°08′43″N 74°36′58″W
  - elevation: 1,352 ft (412 m)

Bush Kill is a river in Delaware County in New York. It flows into the Pepacton Reservoir west of Arena.
