= Lower Beach Hill Brook =

- Location of the mouth of Lower Beach Hill Brook in New York Lower Beach Hill Brook (the United States)

Location
- Country: United States
- State: New York
- County: Delaware

Physical characteristics
- Source
  - coordinates: 42°03′32″N 74°46′48″W
- Mouth: Pepacton Reservoir
  - coordinates: 42°04′30″N 74°50′20″W
  - elevation: 1,280 ft (390 m)

Lower Beach Hill Brook is a river in Delaware County in New York. It flows into the Pepacton Reservoir east-southeast of Downsville.
