= Delaware and Northern Railroad =

Railroad in New York (1905–1942)

Overview
- Headquarters: Margaretville, New York
- Reporting mark: D&N
- Locale: Arkville, New York to East Branch and Andes, New York
- Dates of operation: 1905–1942

Technical
- Track gauge: 4 ft 8 1/2 in (1,435 mm) standard gauge

The Delaware and Northern Railroad (reporting mark D&N) was a small railroad in Delaware County, New York, that was founded in 1905, and was planned to go from the hamlet of East Branch, where it would make a connection with the New York, Ontario and Western Railway, to Arkville, where it would connect with the Ulster and Delaware. This line ran close to the banks of the East Branch of the Delaware River, and had plans of expansion, but never made it far, only getting to Arkville. The all but defunct line was sold to the state of New York in 1942, which took over its right of way, scrapped the line, and built the Pepacton Reservoir. . The Pepacton railroad then took over any remaining viable right of way.

== History ==
=== Delaware and Eastern Railroad ===
The president of the New York, Ontario and Western Railway, whose name was R.B. Williams, got the idea for another railroad near the end of the 19th century. This railroad would start at the busy town of Wilkes-Barre, Pennsylvania, reach the beginning of the East Branch of the Delaware River near the town of Hancock, New York, where it would make a junction with Williams' O&W Railway and the Erie Railroad, and keep going along the rest of the river to Arkville, New York, where it would make a connection with the already existing Ulster and Delaware Railroad. It would then go northeast to Delanson, New York, where it would make a sharp north turn to the thriving town of Schenectady, New York, where there also lie the Schenectady Locomotive Works. There was also to be a branch that was to go from an area between the towns of Union Grove, New York, and Shavertown, New York, where a branch would go to Andes, New York, and make a sharp northeast turn for the town of Bovina, New York. It would be called the "Delaware and Eastern Railroad", as construction would begin at the Delaware River and go east (northeast, actually) to the town of Schenectady.

There was a problem, though; there was another railroad that was about to be chartered, called the Middleburgh and Schoharie. It would go from Middleburgh, New York, to Grand Gorge, New York, where it would meet the Ulster and Delaware Railroad, and continue on to Scranton, Pennsylvania. That would mean that it would serve practically the same purpose as the Delaware and Eastern. So the future crew of the D&E and the future crew of the M&S had a meeting in Albany, New York, to see which railroad would be chartered. It was eventually decided that the D&E would be chartered. So another person, J.J. Searing, became president of the D&E, and had taken on the task of charting. Construction began at East Branch, New York in 1906, with two subsidiaries helping with the construction; the Hancock and East Branch and the Schenectady and Margaretville, which were soon incorporated into the D&E. Service started later that year. The D&E's first locomotive, an ex-Delaware, Lackawanna and Western locomotive that arrived at Downsville, New York, the D&E's headquarters. The branch to Andes, which was planned to reach Bovina, was constructed the same year, and was called the Andes Branch. Service didn't begin on the branch until 1907, however, and when it first opened, the station at the end of the branch, the Andes Station, was just being completed.

While things might have seemed good on the surface, there were bad things in the progress of the railroad being finished. There were rises in drops in the progress of extending the railroad, and a telegraph was sent in 1907 saying that they weren't continuing the extension. This was because the workers believed that they were getting insufficient pay. With extension ground to a halt, the railroad was stuck being a 37.52-mile-long railroad from East Branch to Arkville, New York, where it met the Ulster & Delaware. There wasn't enough money being made from the passenger service in the small Delaware County towns, and the railroad was headed straight for bankruptcy. A wreck also took place in 1908. It took place in Arena, New York, where a train had collapsed on the weak rails and sent it into the river below. This cut into service on the line by holding up trains trying to go by. The railroad went bankrupt in 1911, when it had five locomotives, and it was re-organized later that year as the Delaware and Northern Railroad.

==== Schenectady and Margaretville ====
For a time Grand Gorge was the site of great activity when the construction of the Schenectady and Margaretville Railroad was attempted. Special sidings were built for contractors and a large volume of equipment and supplies were delivered to commence construction. Hundreds of Italian laborers recruited from New York City were set to work grading the new line. Unfortunately, the money soon ran out, the workers were not paid and the whole project collapsed. Many of the laborers walked back to New York City following the tracks on which they had arrived. Evidence of the grading can still be seen today along the valley from Grand Gorge Railroad Station down to Prattsville.

=== Delaware and Northern Railroad ===
This new railroad had William H. Seif as the new president, and still had the plans of the old railroad, hoping to extend to Wilkes-Barre and Schenectady. Many changes were made; three of the D&E's old locomotives were scrapped (D&N #1-3), and the remaining two (D&E #2 & 4), were reassigned as D&N locomotives #4 & 6, along with new ones purchased from the Chicago and Eastern Illinois Railroad, along with the headquarters being moved from Downsville to Margaretville, with an entire yard built there. Margaretville was now the busiest part of the line, with 20 workers and two motor cars for maintenance on the line, and when it was time for the town fair, ten people were given jobs at the shops.

Since 1907, the City of New York was looking for a good place to put a reservoir. There was the Ashokan Reservoir in what used to be the Ashokan Valley, which the U&D helped build. The D&N officials got together to discuss an idea of an extension from Andes to Bovina, and another from Grand Gorge to Prattsville, where the line could get the supplies for a reservoir that was planned to be near the line. However, the town of Bovina didn't like the idea, and it was dropped. The railroad now had an income loss of $50,898, and because there was a good chance of a $29,392 debt, prices were increased from 3.6 cents a mile to 5 cents a mile. An offer came to the D&N from the Delaware and Hudson Railroad in 1921 to buy the line, but they refused. With the new receivers being Andrew Moreland and Jim Welch, they made wage cuts, as to keep some money to pay off the debts they owed.

A big relief came in 1926, when the railroad purchased a maroon Brill motor car which they named the "Red Heifer". It made two round trips a day, and saved the line $30,000 a year. But this still didn't save it from bankruptcy. The growing usage of the automobile was killing the line. The Title Guarantee & Trust Company filed a petition to abandon the line in 1926, as the line was now doing very poorly. Concrete was destroying the bluestone industry. The hillsides were nearly stripped of timber. The chemical plants were closing down, for they needed wood to run the plant. There wasn't even enough traffic to raise money to pay for one round trip a day. But then Sam Rosoff, from present-day Belarus, became the new president in 1928. But this didn't mean a lot to some people, considering there were rumors that he intended a $9,000,000 squeeze, and that he brought the line just to transport materials for the construction of the Pepacton Reservoir.

After all the commotion, when the D&N workers were finally about to extend the line, the Interstate Commerce Commission wasn't allowing any extensions. There would be too much competition from other railroads. There were very few places that the railroad could get to Pennsylvania without crossing or touching another railroad. The new president sold the railroad to the State of New York in 1939 for $200,000, and was sinking $60,000 into the line every year until he sold it. The railroad was abandoned in 1942, with all the 40,000 tons of rolling stock and locomotives sold for scrap at a price of $50,000 apiece. The entire railroad was soon scrapped, with the Pepacton taking over most of its right-of-way.

== Stations ==
=== Main Line stations ===
- East Branch Railroad Station
- Harvard Railroad Station
- Long Flat Railroad Station
- Shinhopple Railroad Station
- Gregorytown Railroad Station
- Corbett Railroad Station
- Colchester Railroad Station
- Downsville Railroad Station
- Scoville Railroad Station
- Pepacton Railroad Station
- Shavertown Railroad Station
- Andes Junction Railroad Station
- Union Grove Railroad Station
- Arena Railroad Station
- Dunraven Railroad Station
- Keeney's Railroad Station
- Margaretville Railroad Station
- Arkville Railroad Station

=== Branch stations ===
- Pleasant Valley Railroad Station
- Wolf Hollow Railroad Station
- Kaufman's Railroad Station
- Andes Railroad Station
