= Andes Historic District =

Historic district in New York, United States

- U.S. National Register of Historic Places
- U.S. Historic district
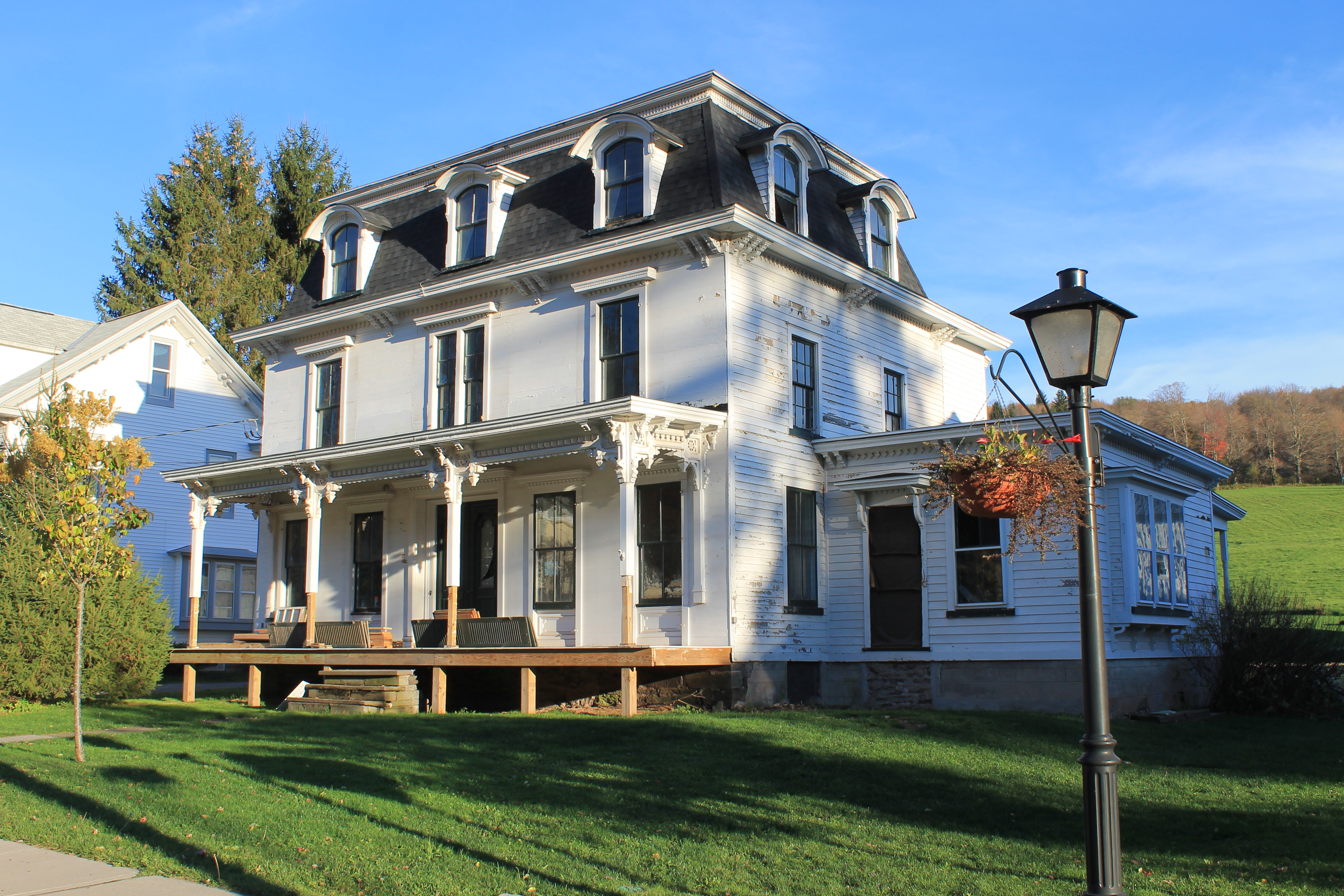
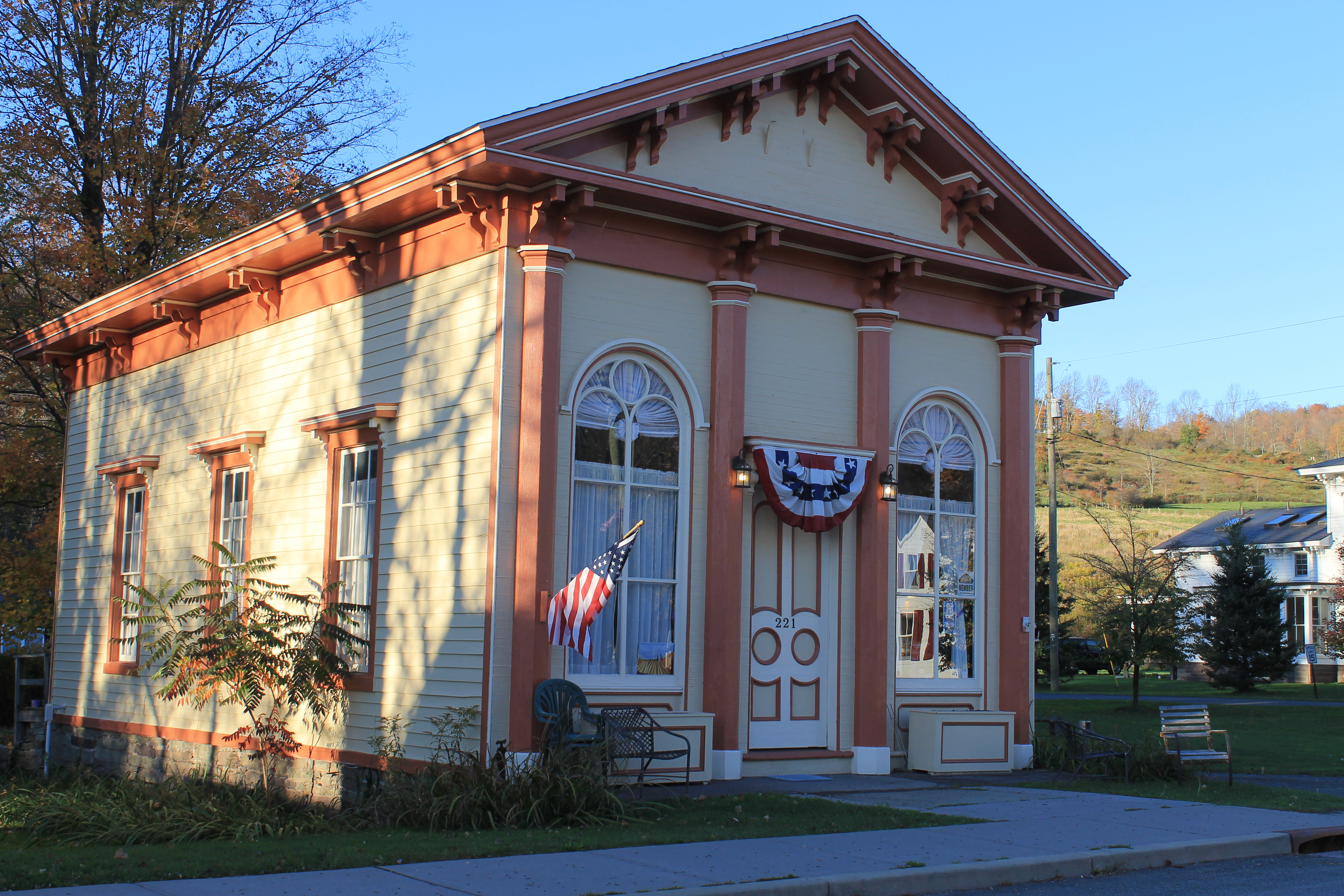
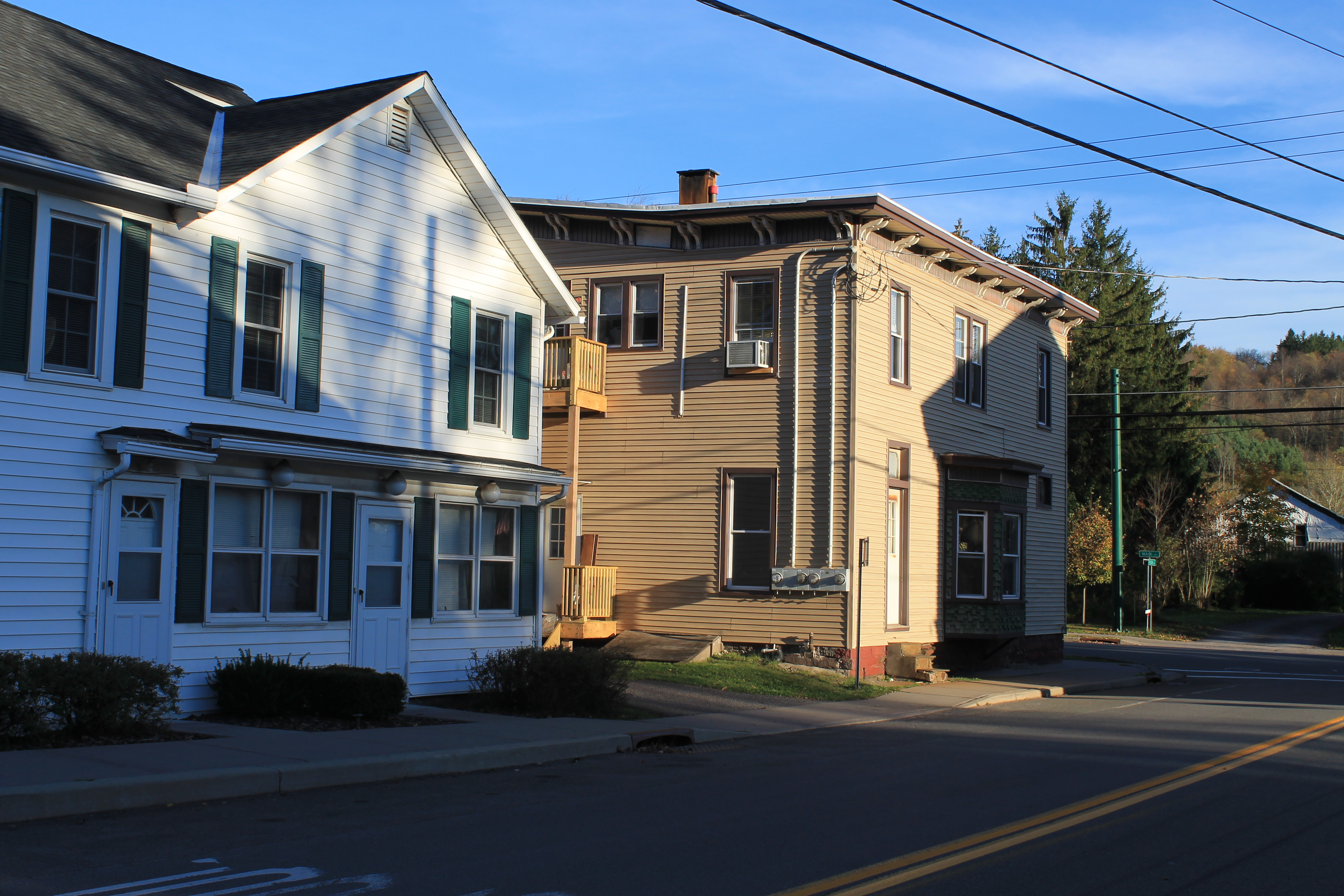
- Three buildings in the Andes Historic District

- Location within New York Location within the United States
- Location: Delaware Ave., Main and High Sts., and Tremperskill Rd., Andes, New York
- Coordinates: 42°11′22″N 74°46′51″W
- Area: 55 acres (22 ha)
- Built: 1825
- Architectural style: Greek Revival, Late Victorian
- NRHP reference No.: 84002215
- Added to NRHP: June 28, 1984

Andes Historic District is a national historic district located at Andes in Delaware County, New York. The district contains 129 contributing buildings. The buildings are largely two story detached frame structures dating to the mid-19th century. The majority are residential structures.

It was listed on the National Register of Historic Places in 1984.
