= East Delaware Tunnel =

Aqueduct in New York

Coordinates: 42.07423342°N 74.898356°W

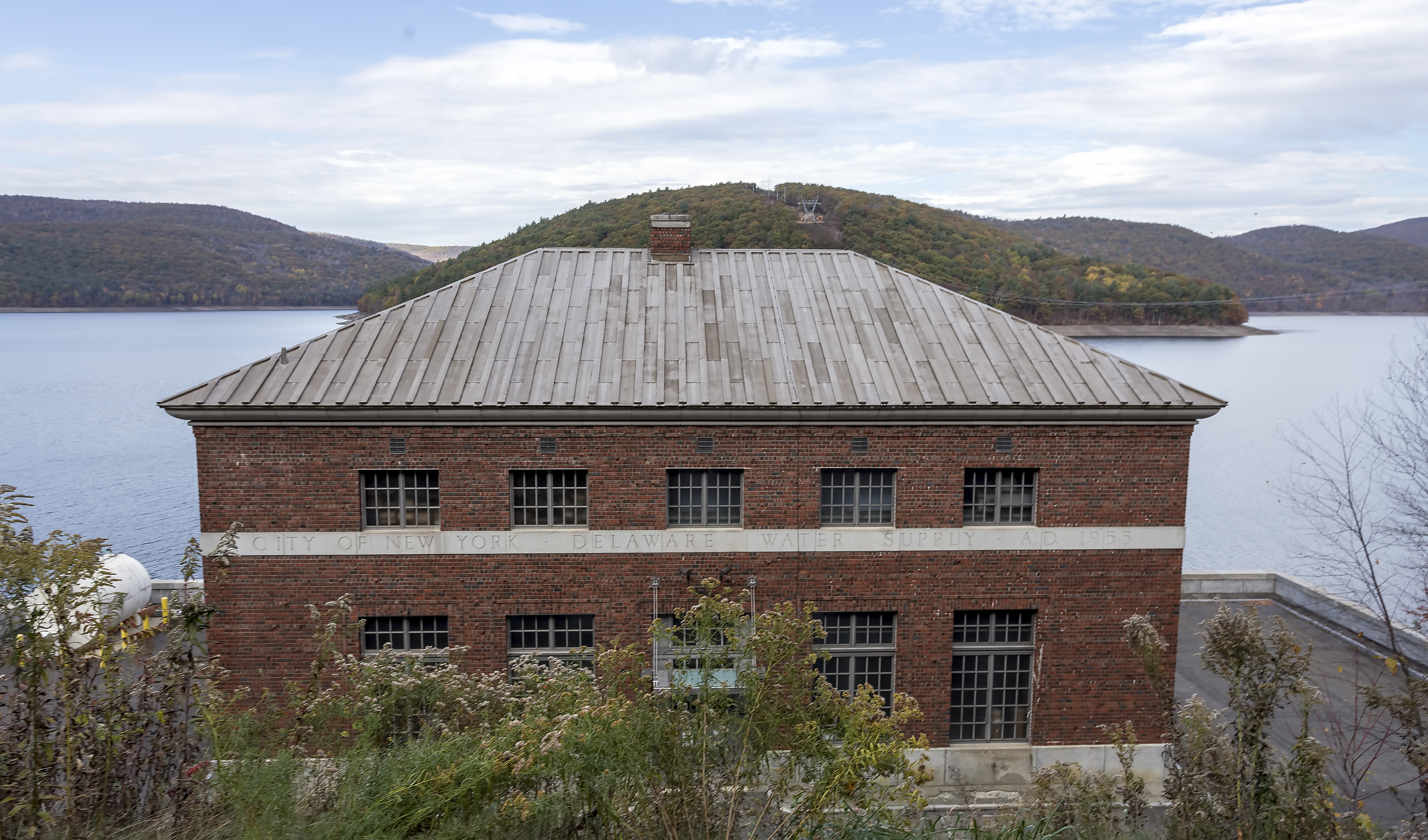
Entrance building, Pepacton Reservoir in 2015

The East Delaware Tunnel is a 25-mile (40 km) aqueduct in the New York City water supply system. Located in the Catskill Mountains of New York State, it was constructed within a six-year period between 1949 and 1955 to transport drinking water from the Pepacton Reservoir to the Rondout Reservoir. The tunnel begins near the former site of Pepacton, New York, and ends near the former site of Eureka, New York, passing through Delaware County, Sullivan County and Ulster County. The tunnel has a maximum transmission capacity of 500 million US gallons (1,900,000 m^{3}) per day and was constructed at a width of 11 feet (3.4 m).

== See also ==
- List of reservoirs and dams in New York
