= Kathryn Krick =

American pastor, author and social media personality (born 1991)

- Krick in 2021
- Born: January 1, 1991 (age 35); Andes, New York, United States
- Education: Ithaca College
- Occupations: Pastor, author

Instagram information
- Page: Kathryn Krick
- Followers: 608,000

TikTok information
- Page: apostlekathrynkrick
- Followers: 279,900

YouTube information
- Channel: Apostle Kathryn Krick
- Years active: 2011–present
- Subscribers: 1,070,000
- Last updated: October 14, 2026
- Website: apostlekathrynkrick.com

Kathryn Krick (born January 1, 1991) is an American Pentecostal pastor, author and social media personality. She is the founder of Five-Fold Church in Los Angeles, having been made an "apostle" by Tanzanian minister GeorDavie. Krick claims to perform miracles, faith healing and deliverance from demonic activity. Gaining online exposure through social media, she has been labeled "the TikTok apostle of Los Angeles." Critics have described Krick as a "cult leader," and her claims of performing healings have been scrutinized by medical professionals and religious commentators.

== Early life, education and performing career ==
Krick was born in Andes, New York, on January 1, 1991. She was raised in a Presbyterian church. After receiving her undergraduate degree from Ithaca College in 2013, she moved to Los Angeles to find work as an actor. She appeared in some commercials and had a small part in a reality TV dating show and worshiped at Mosaic, a multisite evangelical church. In 2015, she released her first Christian EDM single, called "Perfect Love". She also worked as a waitress, nanny and Lyft driver.

== Ministry career ==
Around this time, Krick began attending Pentecostal worship services held by Kenyan pastor Lovy Elias. In 2016, at age 25, Krick attended a Pentecostal healing conference in L.A. at which Tanzanian minister and self-proclaimed "prophet" GeorDavie Moses Kasambale was a lead speaker. During the conference, according to Krick, GeorDavie singled out Krick and told her that she was called to be an apostle of Jesus and that God would do miracles through her. Krick has described GeorDavie as her spiritual father.

Krick has no formal seminary training. She began holding services for what she called Advanced Anointing Church in 2017. Her services were initially held outdoors on Mulholland Drive with just a few people in attendance. After several months, she traveled to Tanzania to visit GeorDavie's church. On stage, she asked GeorDavie for the power to perform miracles. Pouring oil on her head, GeorDavie said that she had been anointed for this purpose. Krick later said that video remarks she made praising GeorDavie were poorly chosen and that she "wish[ed] [she] could go back and say it in a different way."

Her church held small outdoor services during the COVID-19 pandemic. It continued to struggle until December 2020, when she released a "highlight reel" on TikTok of purported miraculous healings and claimed deliverances from demonic oppression. Participants would fall to the ground, kneel, weep, and convulse their bodies. Within two days, the highlight reel received over one million views and thousands of comments. By 2024, she had amassed nearly a million followers on social media and subscribers on YouTube and had begun leading large in-person events around the world. Her church—renamed Five-Fold Church—received attendance of hundreds at services in the Belasco Theater.

== Books ==
Krick has released three books: The Secret of the Anointing: Accessing the Power of God to Walk in Miracles (2023), Unlock Your Deliverance: Keys to Freedom From Demonic Oppression (2025) and Ignite Revival: Be Set on Fire to Change the World (2026). Videos of attendees visibly shaking at book signings for Ignite Revival went viral in 2026.

== Reception ==
Alta Journal compared Krick to Aimee Semple McPherson, who a century before had built a large Pentecostal megachurch and broadcast ministry in Los Angeles, and Kathryn Kuhlman, who filled the Shrine Auditorium with monthly "healing and miracle services." Leah Payne of Portland Seminary said that Krick fell into a trend in Pentecostalism of making "wonder-workers of many kinds" into important figures. "For the faithful, they provide public demonstrations of the Holy Spirit's capacity to work in the life of any practitioner."

Pippa MacKay, a retired general practitioner and former chairwoman of the New Zealand Medical Association, countered Krick's claims of performing miraculous healings and said Krick's claims crossed a "dangerous line", noting that for "someone who has genuine epilepsy, stopping a medication is dangerous." Archer said it was "very dangerous" for leaders to "tell people that they're healed from something and then they're not".

Krick has been described by Mike Winger as a "cult leader" and by Allie Beth Stuckey as leading a "false ministry". Winger cited a 2024 video of Krick's church members bowing down before her on her birthday. Melissa Archer, who traveled with Krick to Tanzania when she was anointed by GeorDavie, later left what she called GeorDavie's "cult". In an October 2026 investigative video series, The Roys Report described GeorDavie's church and Krick's Five-Fold Church as "cult-like churches". Cult deprogrammer Rick Alan Ross said that Five-Fold Church "fits well within the construct of what can be seen as a destructive personality cult."

In 2023, Krick said that critics of her ministry were operating in a "spirit of jealousy" and in 2022 attributed her detractors' comments to Satan.
