= Gulf Brook =

- Location of the mouth of Gulf Brook in New York Gulf Brook (the United States)

Location
- Country: United States
- State: New York
- County: Delaware

Physical characteristics
- Source
  - coordinates: 42°03′33″N 74°50′38″W
- Mouth: Holliday Brook
  - coordinates: 42°03′20″N 74°52′12″W
  - elevation: 1,457 ft (444 m)

Gulf Brook is a river in Delaware County in New York. It flows into Holliday Brook east-southeast of Downsville.
