= Jackson-Aitken Farm =

Historic house in New York, United States

- U.S. National Register of Historic Places
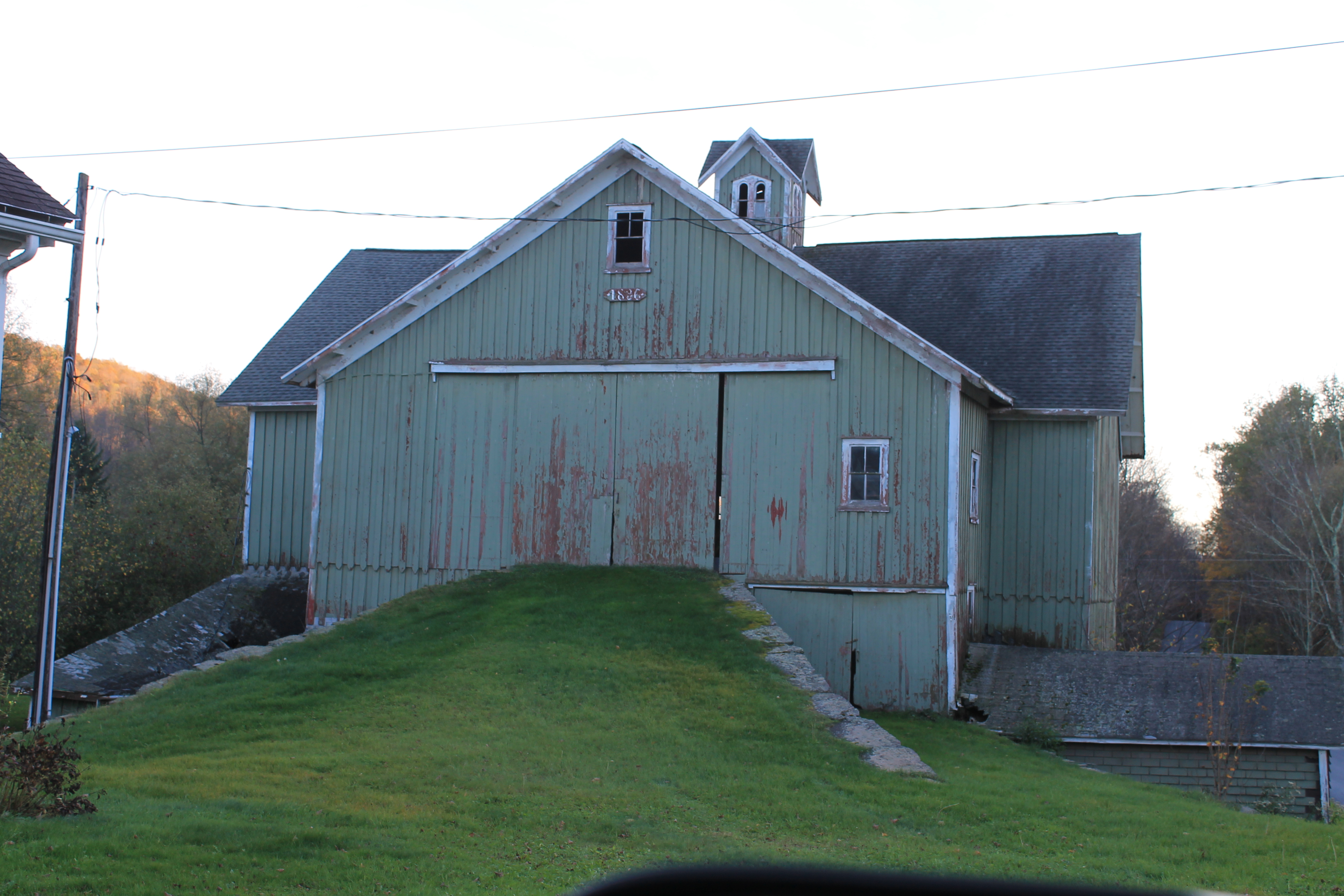

- Location within New York Location within the United States
- Nearest city: Andes, New York
- Coordinates: 42°9′28″N 74°52′10″W
- Area: 39 acres (16 ha)
- Built: 1853
- Architectural style: Greek Revival
- NRHP reference No.: 03000044
- Added to NRHP: February 20, 2003

Jackson-Aitken Farm is a historic farm house, dairy barn and farm fields located at Andes in Delaware County, New York, United States. The farmhouse was built about 1850 and is a one and one half wood-frame structure in a vernacular Greek Revival style. The barn is a large three story wooden building with a cross gabled banked entrance built in 1896. It features a distinctive cupola.

It was listed on the National Register of Historic Places in 2003.

== See also ==
- National Register of Historic Places listings in Delaware County, New York
