= Barkaboom Stream =

- Location of the mouth of Barkaboom Stream in New York Barkaboom Stream (the United States)

Location
- Country: United States
- State: New York
- County: Delaware

Physical characteristics
- Source
  - coordinates: 42°04′04″N 74°43′50″W
- Mouth: Pepacton Reservoir
  - coordinates: 42°05′07″N 74°47′48″W
  - elevation: 1,280 ft (390 m)

Basin features
- Tributaries
  - right: Deerlick Brook

Barkaboom Stream is a river in Delaware County in New York. It flows into the Pepacton Reservoir southwest of Arena.
