= Purgatory Chasm State Reservation =

Protected area in Massachusetts, US

- Purgatory Chasm
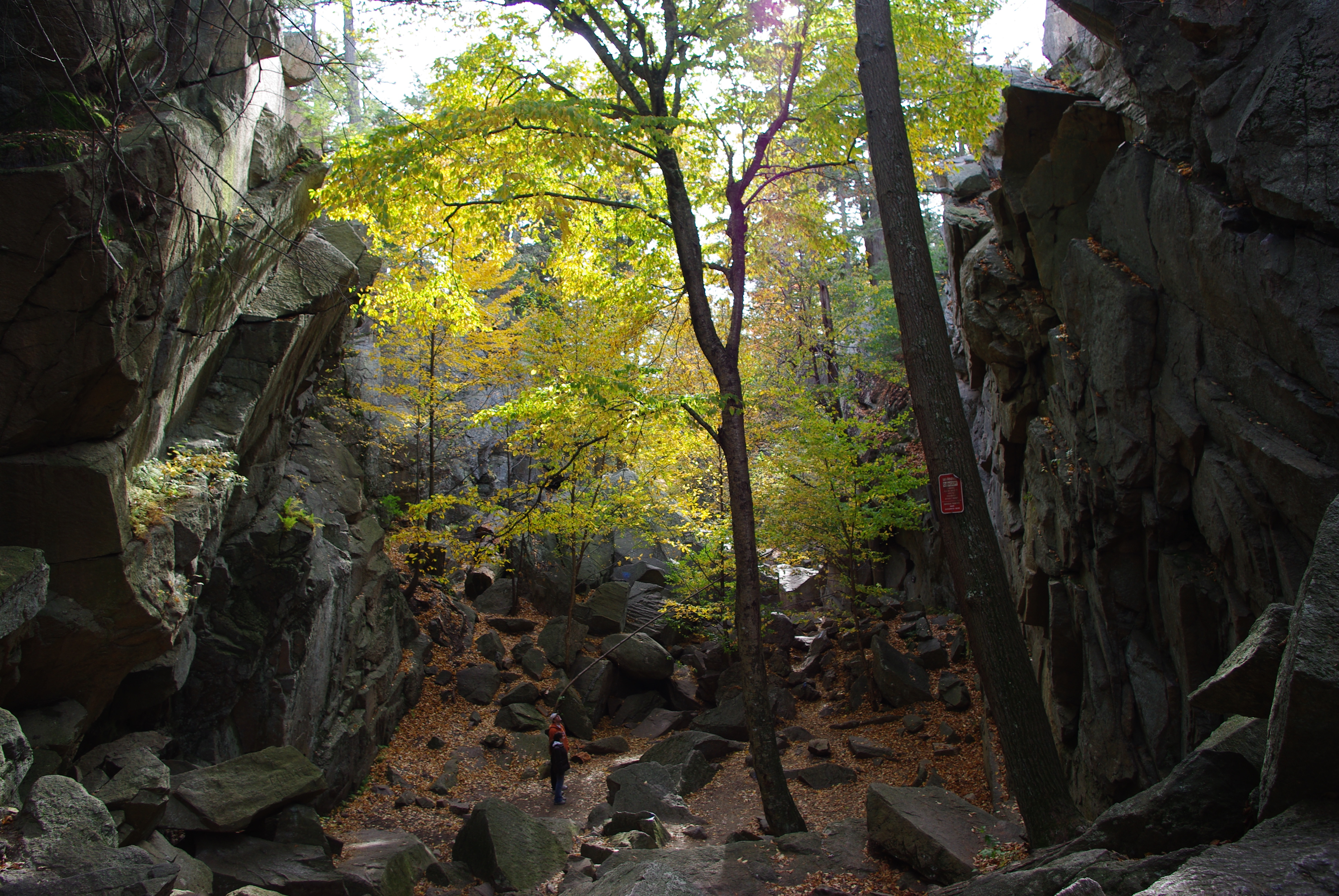
- View of Purgatory Chasm, looking south, in 2008.

- Location within Massachusetts
- Location: 198 Purgatory Road; Sutton, Massachusetts 01590
- Coordinates: 42°07′45″N 71°42′43″W
- Length: 2.14 mi (3.44 km)
- Area: 100 acres (40 ha)
- Elevation: 472 ft (144 m)
- Established: 1919
- Operator: Massachusetts Department of Conservation and Recreation
- Website: Website

Purgatory Chasm State Reservation is a protected state park in Sutton, Massachusetts. Located within the Blackstone Valley, the reservation is managed by the Massachusetts Department of Conservation and Recreation.

== History ==
Previously owned by the Whitin Machine Works, Purgatory Chasm was declared a state park in 1919. The reservation is notable for its .25-mile-long (400 m), 70-foot-deep (21 m) chasm in granite bedrock with abrupt precipices and caves. Various theories have been proposed to account for the creation of the chasm. According to one source, it was created when glacial meltwater ripped out bedrock at the end of the last Ice Age.

Purgatory Chasm is open to the public, although the chasm proper is closed to hikers during the winter season because of icy hazards. There are 2 miles (3.2 km) of hiking trails, and rock climbing is allowed by permit. The reservation also includes picnic areas, a visitor center, and a playground.

== In popular culture ==
- A 1992 episode of Rescue 911 concerned events at Purgatory Chasm.
- Scenes from the 2015 film The Sea of Trees were filmed at Purgatory Chasm.

== Gallery ==
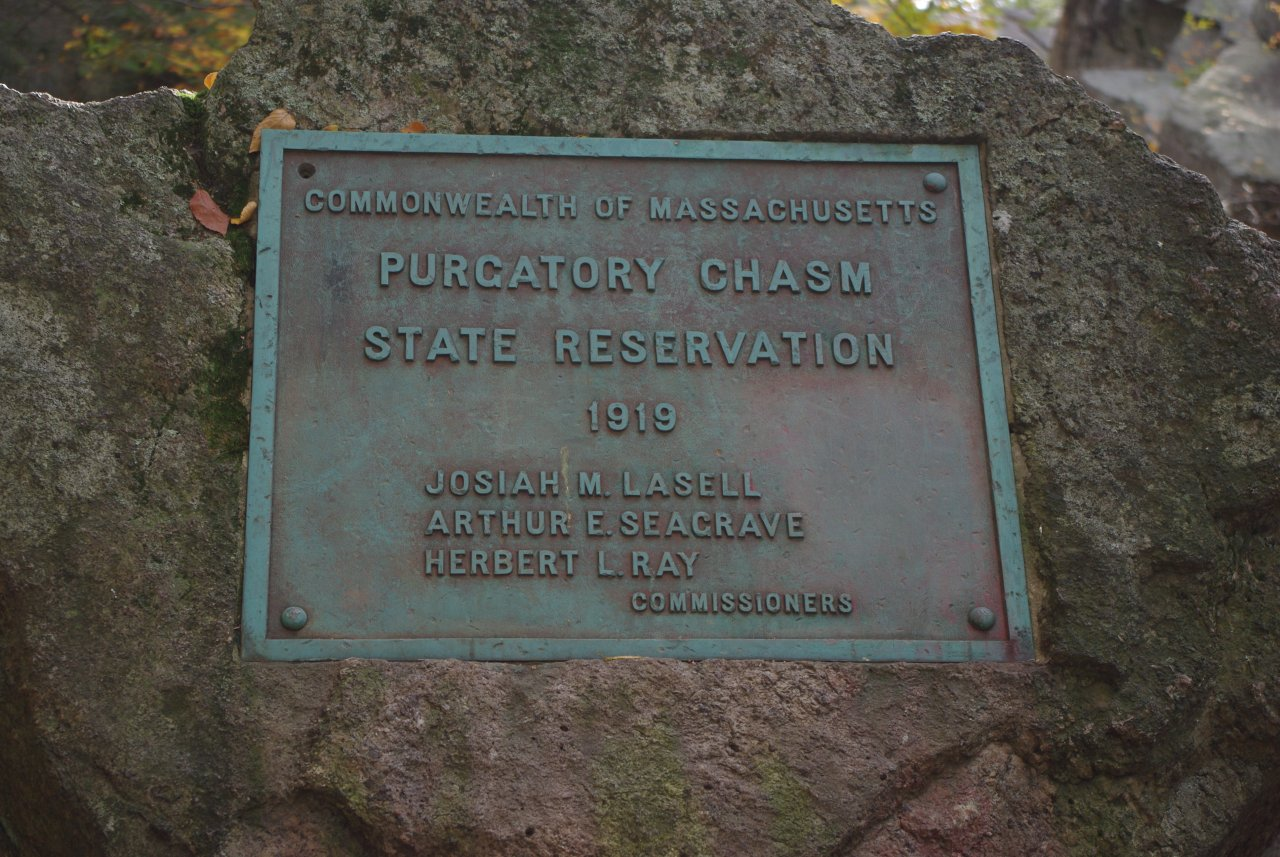
A state plaque on the north side.

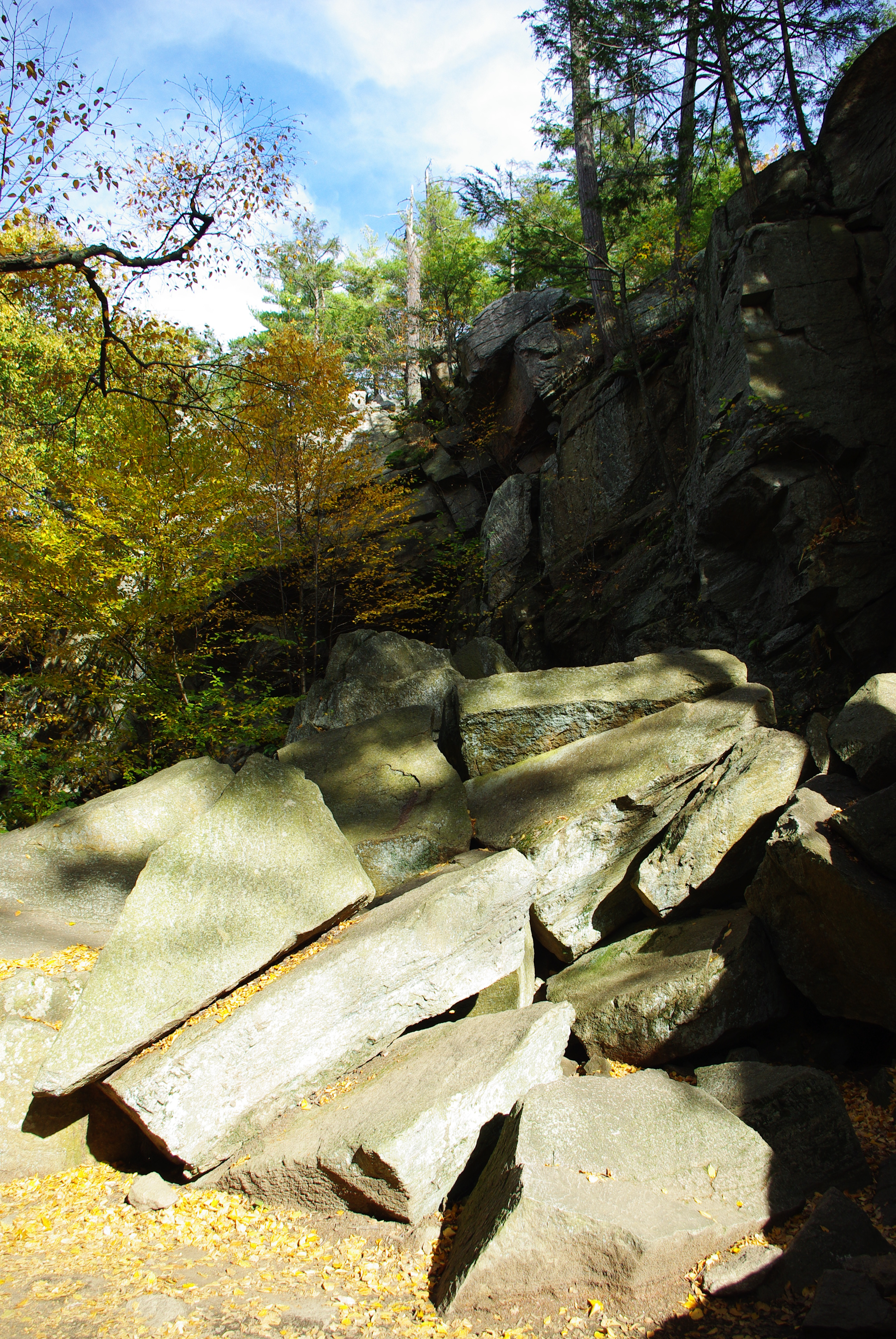
Partial view of the park, looking south.

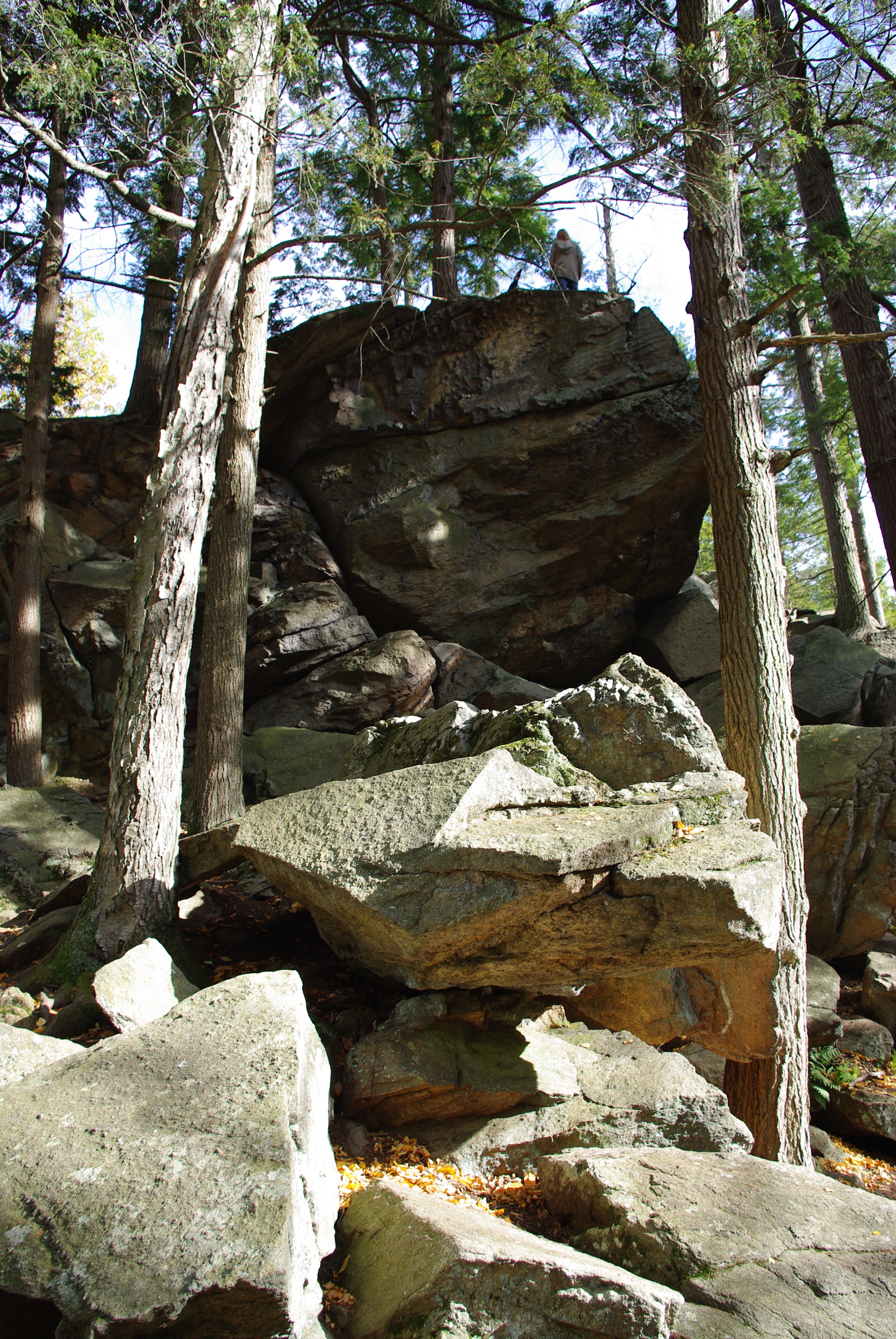
A rock formation.

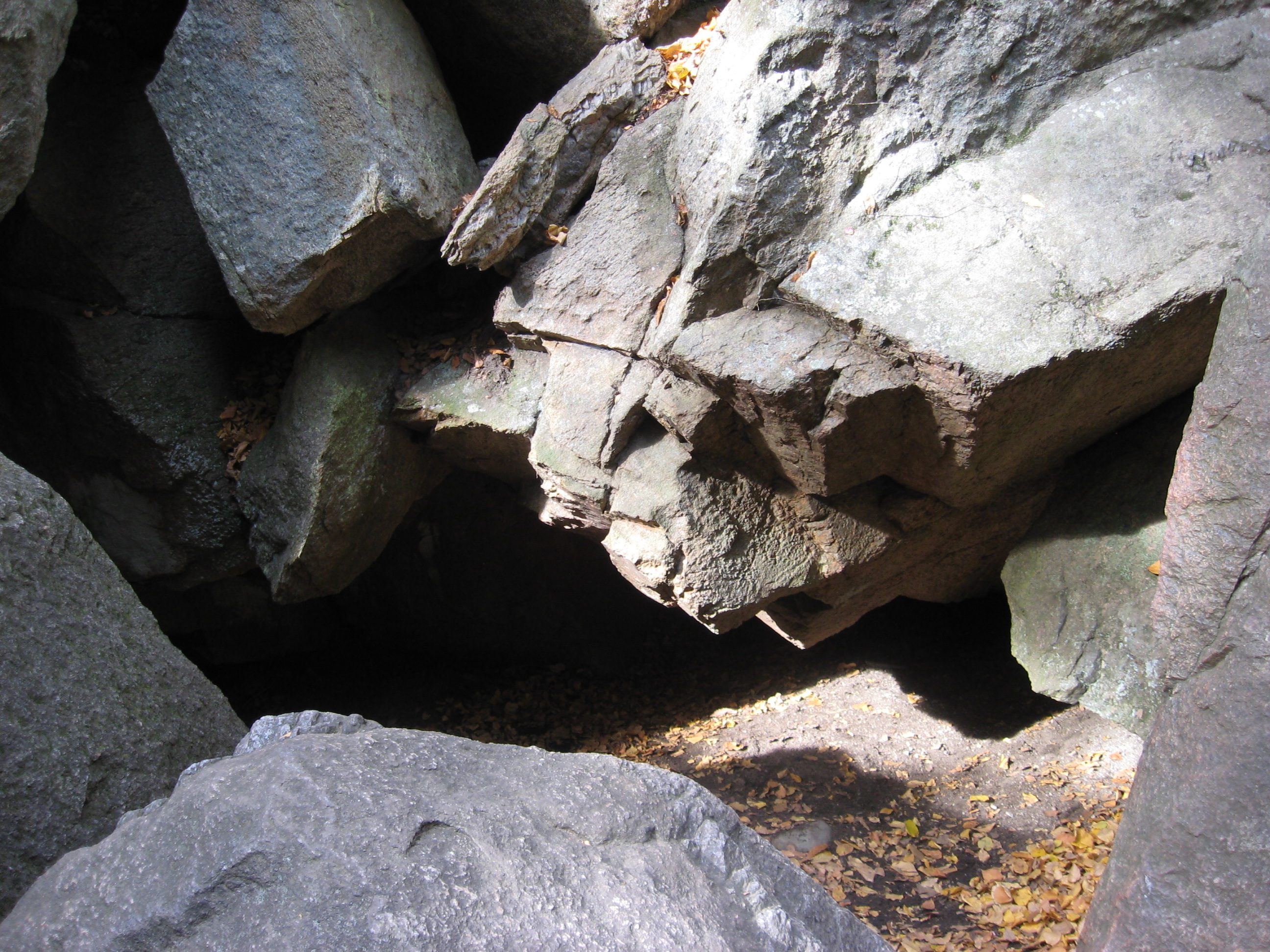
View of King's Cave.

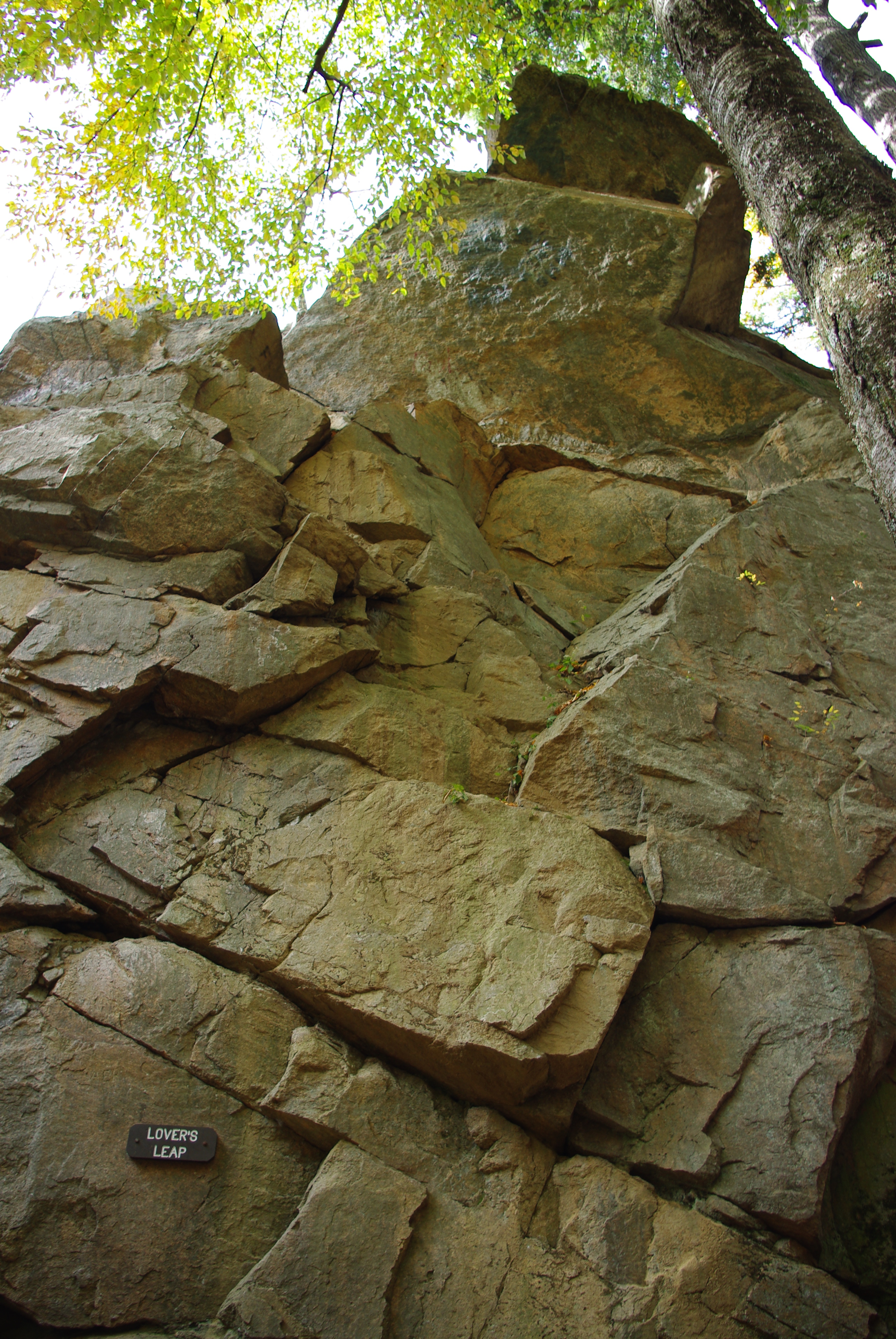
View of Lover's Leap.

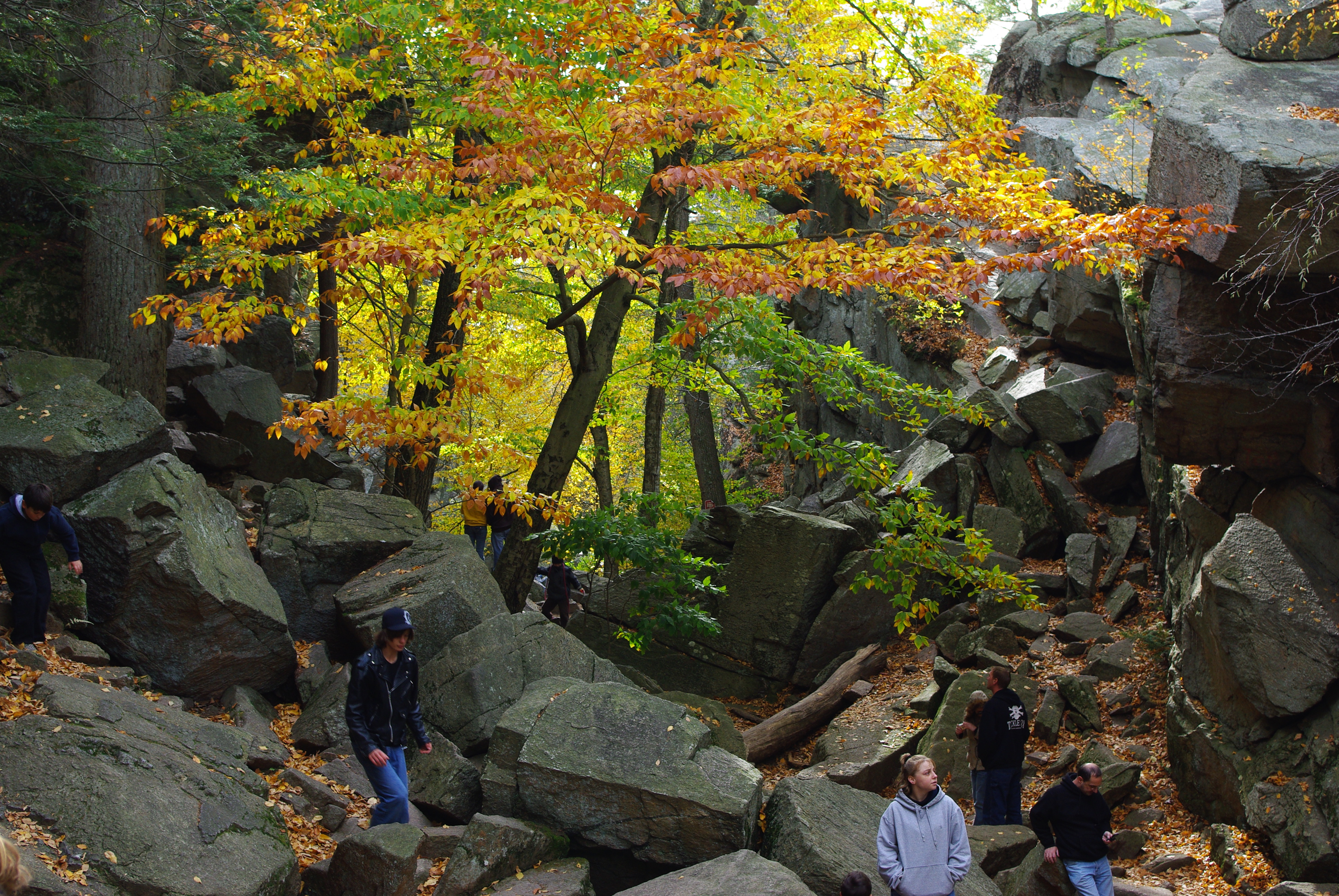
Partial view of the park, with visitors.
