= Union Free School (Downsville, New York) =

- U.S. National Register of Historic Places
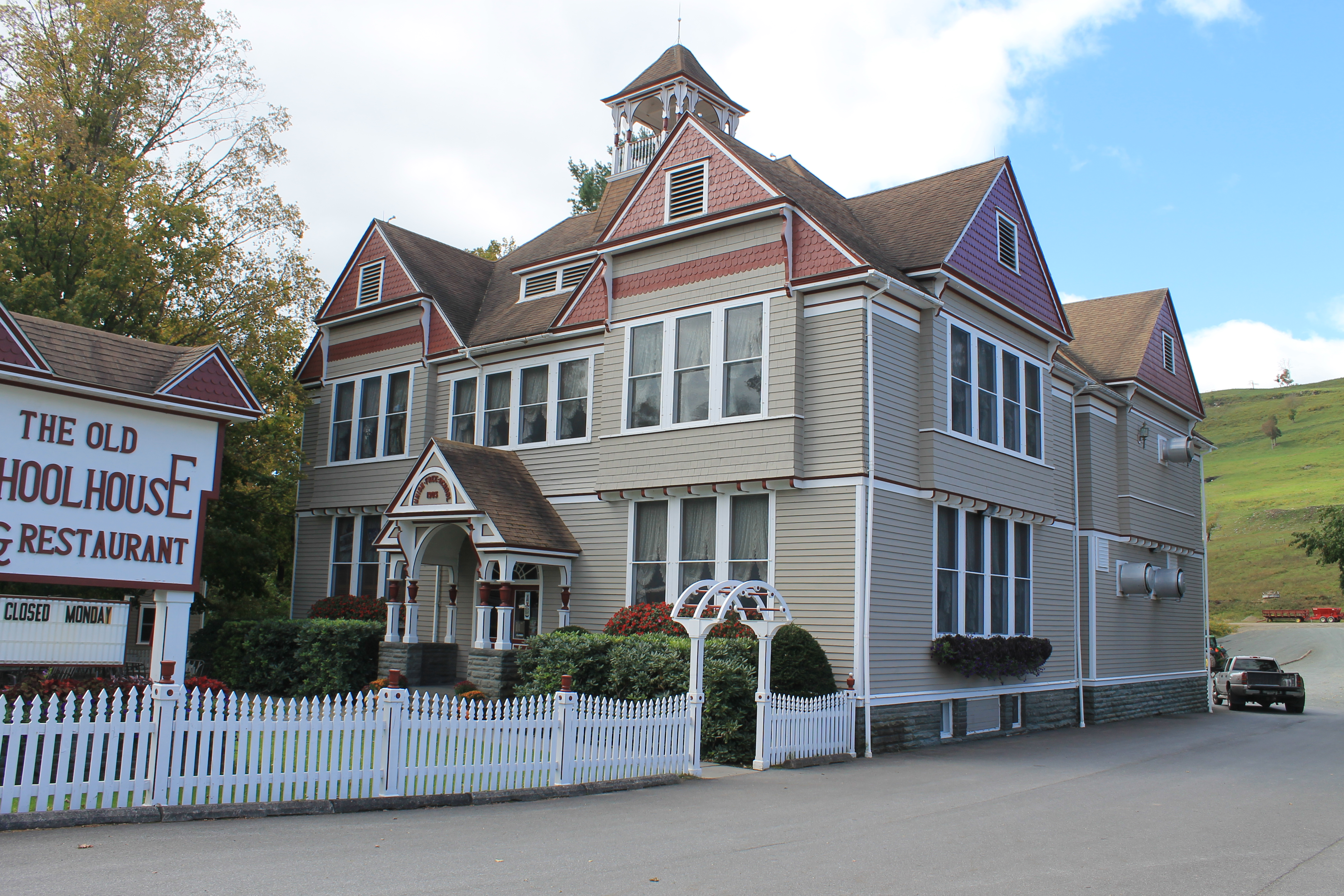
- Downsville Union Free School

- Location within New York Location within the United States
- Location: 218 NY 206, Downsville, New York
- Coordinates: 42°4′59″N 74°59′53″W
- Area: 1 acre (0.40 ha)
- Built: 1903
- Architect: Fairbanks, Andrew J.
- Architectural style: Late Victorian
- NRHP reference No.: 04001345
- Added to NRHP: December 6, 2004

Union Free School is a historic school building located at Downsville in Delaware County, New York, United States. It was built in 1903-1906 and is a large T-shaped wood-framed building on a raised foundation of concrete and bluestone. The main section of the school is two and one half stories with a hipped roof and features a decorative belfry.

It was listed on the National Register of Historic Places in 2004.

== See also ==
- National Register of Historic Places listings in Delaware County, New York
