= Downsville Bridge =

- Downsville Covered Bridge
- U.S. National Register of Historic Places
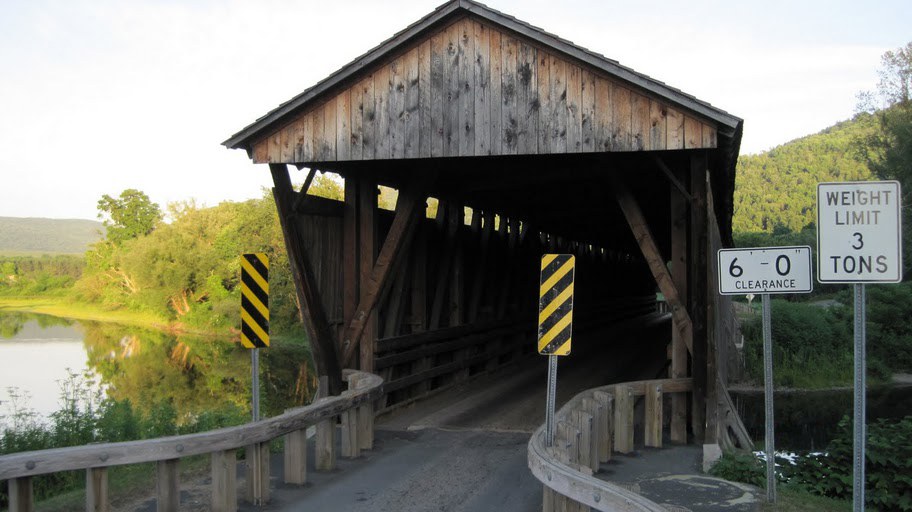

- Location within New York Location within the United States
- Location: East Branch of the Delaware River, Bridge Street, Downsville, New York
- Coordinates: 42°4′34″N 74°59′28″W
- Area: less than one acre
- Built: 1854
- Built by: Murray, Robert
- NRHP reference No.: 99000503
- Added to NRHP: April 29, 1999

Downsville Bridge is a wooden covered bridge over the East Branch of the Delaware River in the hamlet of Downsville in Delaware County, New York. Designed by Scottish immigrant Robert Murray, the bridge was built in 1854, and is a single span, timber and plan framed bridge. The bridge measures 174 feet (53 m) long and 19 feet (5.8 m) wide.

The bridge was listed on the National Register of Historic Places in 1999. It was closed to motor vehicle traffic on May 14, 2026 after structural concerns were found during a safety inspection by Delaware County Public Works. There is currently no date set as to when repairs to the bridge will be made.

== See also ==
- List of bridges on the National Register of Historic Places in New York
- List of covered bridges in New York
- National Register of Historic Places listings in Delaware County, New York
