= Shavertown, New York =

Coordinates: 42°5′34″N 74°50′21″W

Shavertown was a hamlet in Delaware County, New York. It was submerged by the construction of the Pepacton Reservoir in 1954. Shavertown had a few hundred inhabitants, mostly reliant on the town's timber industry. Acid factories in Shavertown produced wood alcohol and other chemicals. The Delaware and Eastern Railroad ran through the town.
