= Coonamessett River =

River in Falmouth, Massachusetts, US

Coordinates: 41°36′55″N 70°34′23″W

The Coonamessett River, (Latitude: N41° 34.913', Longitude: W 070° 34.412') is a largely groundwater fed coastal river in Falmouth, Massachusetts, on Cape Cod.

== Location ==
It is one of Cape Cod’s largest rivers, flowing approximately 3 miles from the 158- acre kettlehole Coonamessett Pond to the Great Pond estuary and thence 2 miles to Vineyard Sound.

== Fish ==
The Coonamessett River once contained some of the largest populations of five species of diadromous fish in southeast Massachusetts – Alewife, Blueback Herring, American Eel, White Perch, and sea-run Brook Trout.

== History ==
=== Pre-colonization ===
Humans have modified the river for centuries with mill construction and cranberry cultivation along the banks and its alluvial valley. The Coonamessett River was important to the native people of Cape Cod and to the immigrants who settled here. Coonamessett means “long fish, white pine place” in Wampanoag, also known as the Wôpanâak language. The “long fish” likely referred to Atlantic eels that can still be found in the river

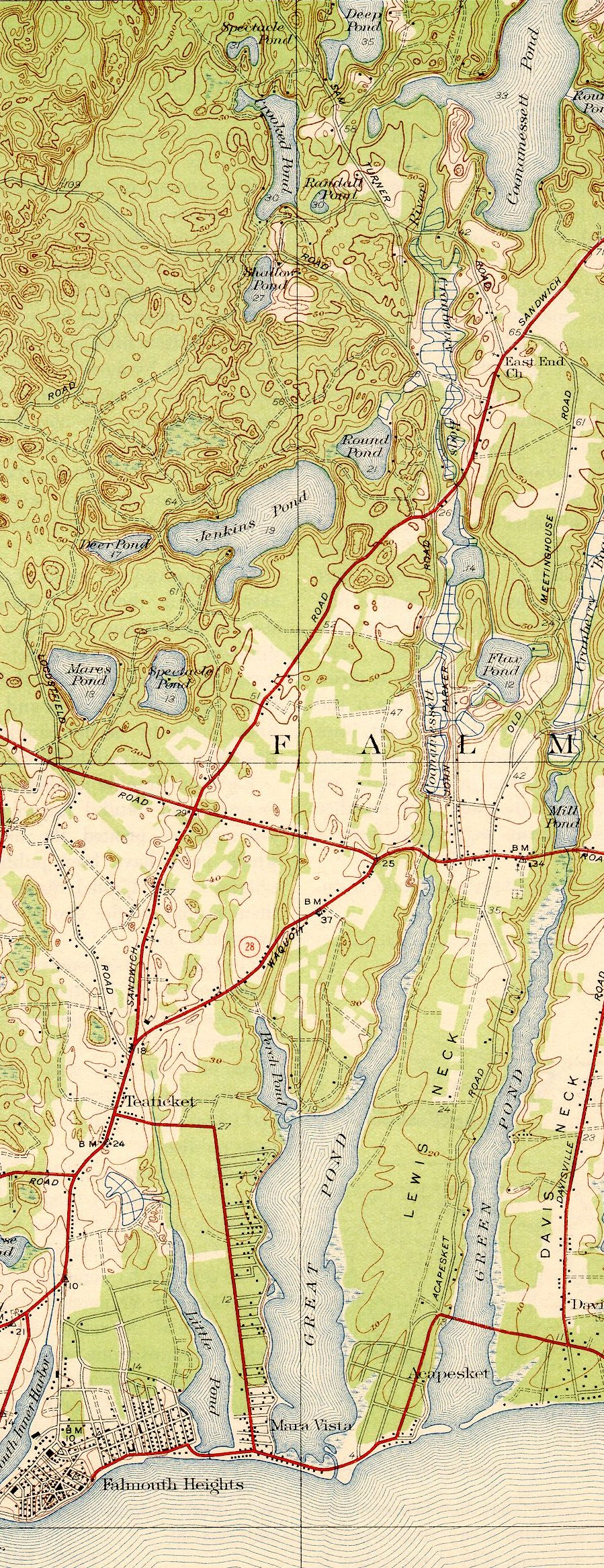
Coonamessett River and environs

Long ago nearly the entire river may have been bordered by red maple or white cedar swamp when the Wampanoag fished for herring.

=== European settlement ===
After European settlers arrived in 1660, the river was initially known as the Five Mile River. Philip Dexter located Falmouth's first grist mill at its mouth around 1700, and by 1795 there were three mills along the river with a corresponding decline in fisheries.

=== Herring war and bylaws ===
A "herring war" began in 1798 with a bylaw giving an elected committee the right to remove any obstructions to allow fish free passage from April 1 to June 10. Tensions reached a peak in 1805 when the anti-herring group packed a cannon on the Village Green with herring. It exploded, killing the gunner. In 1865 further vestiges of the war appeared with another bylaw that read:

Voted that the herring of rivers of the town be allowed to pass up and down said rivers into the ponds unmolested, from 12 o’clock, noon Saturday, to 12 noon on Monday each week, except that the herring in Coonamessett River be allowed from 10 o’clock at night to 5 in the morning of each day in the week unmolested in addition.

=== Conversion of wetland ===
In 1891 the Swift brothers converted river wetlands into cranberry bogs, thus straightening, diking, damming, and channeling the river, reducing some sections to a simple ditch, although much of the river today remains a meandering stream wending through the broad vistas provided by the commercial bogs. Cranberry cultivation increased to 15,000 barrels by 1895. David Belding, Commonwealth Biologist, reported in his 1912 "Report Upon the Alewife Fisheries of Massachusetts":

Below Coonamessett Pond is a timbered channel 3 feet (0.91 m) in width. At the upper fish house is a dam below which the stream passes through 150 acres (0.61 km^{2}) of cranberry bogs, where it is crossed by nine embankments before it finally passes into a series of five ponds. In 1906, alewives were plentiful in Coonamessett River, and a 300-yard (270 m) ditch was dug to allow the fish to reach Coonamessett Pond. The fishery,…is of considerable importance, as the stream is naturally adapted for alewives and Coonamessett Pond provides an excellent spawning ground. The inevitable conflict with the cranberry industry cannot be remedied except by requiring the bog owners to maintain competent passageways for the fish.

=== Cranberries and herrings ===
In 1971, the town of Falmouth purchased more than 100 acres (0.40 km^{2}) of upland, cranberry bog, and Coonamessett River for the dual purposes of conservation and growing cranberries as published in the Town Meeting Warrant. Cranberry agriculture has played a major role in the Town of Falmouth's history and, as noted in the newspapers and correspondence from the Conservation Commission to the Massachusetts Department of Environmental Protection shortly thereafter, the major goal was to preserve cranberry cultivation as farming was rapidly disappearing in Falmouth.

Since this time, cranberry cultivation has continued unchanged while environmental awareness has increased, bringing the conservation goal to the fore. While the Coonamessett maintained a healthy herring run for many years alongside Cranberry cultivation, in recent years the herring run has undergone a massive decline, following a similar decrease across New England which has been widely attributed to at-sea factors external to the rivers. In 2004, fish counters saw only 640 fish and the only about 2000 herring returned to spawn. Concern over the herring run and the disappearance of sea run trout has led to a consensus in the Town for better protection and improvement of the river for fisheries including herring. Critical problems include overfishing and Dutchman's Ditch at the head of the river.

The latter provides the only access to Coonamessett Pond where the herring spawn. The ditch was dug between the stream and the river and lies above the water table during the summer, and is frequently dry when the main herring occurs throughout New England. The river temperature was also raised by the creation of a through-flow agricultural reservoir and the lack of shade along much of the river above that tolerated by trout. Flooding of the bed of the river by sand released from behind dams due to bad river management has eliminated spawning grounds. Some issues raised in the debate over the depth of the river, which is the same as other major New England Herring runs, and nitrate loading have proved to be unfounded. Studies and measurements of nitrate released from commercial and natural bogs shows no significant difference, and both are sinks for nitrates. Many of the major problems have not been addressed in the current plans for the river, due largely to a lack of a consensus among all parties as to the extent and manner of future cranberry cultivation.
