= Massachusetts Division of Ecological Restoration =

The Division of Ecological Restoration (DER) is a division of the Massachusetts Department of Fish and Game within the Executive Office of Energy and Environmental Affairs. DER was created in 2009 with the merger of the Riverways and Wetlands Restoration Programs (formerly within the Massachusetts Office of Coastal Zone Management). DER coordinates ecological restoration to improve ecological condition and to restore ecosystem services.

The Riverways Program (MGL Chapter 21A Section 8) has been maintained within DER and coordinates outreach and technical assistance to support watershed conservation and protection.

The division and partners facilitate capital-based projects including (but not limited to) dam removal and culvert replacement with the goal of restoring aquatic habitats (e.g. salt marshes) and ecosystems across the state. These projects support commercial and recreational fisheries and provide many other benefits such as reduced flooding, improved water quality, carbon sequestration and increased public safety.

Ecological restoration is a core component of the Commonwealth of Massachusetts efforts to build habitat resiliency to better allow fish and wildlife to adapt to climate change – including sea level rise, elevated water temperatures, and increased floods and periods of drought.

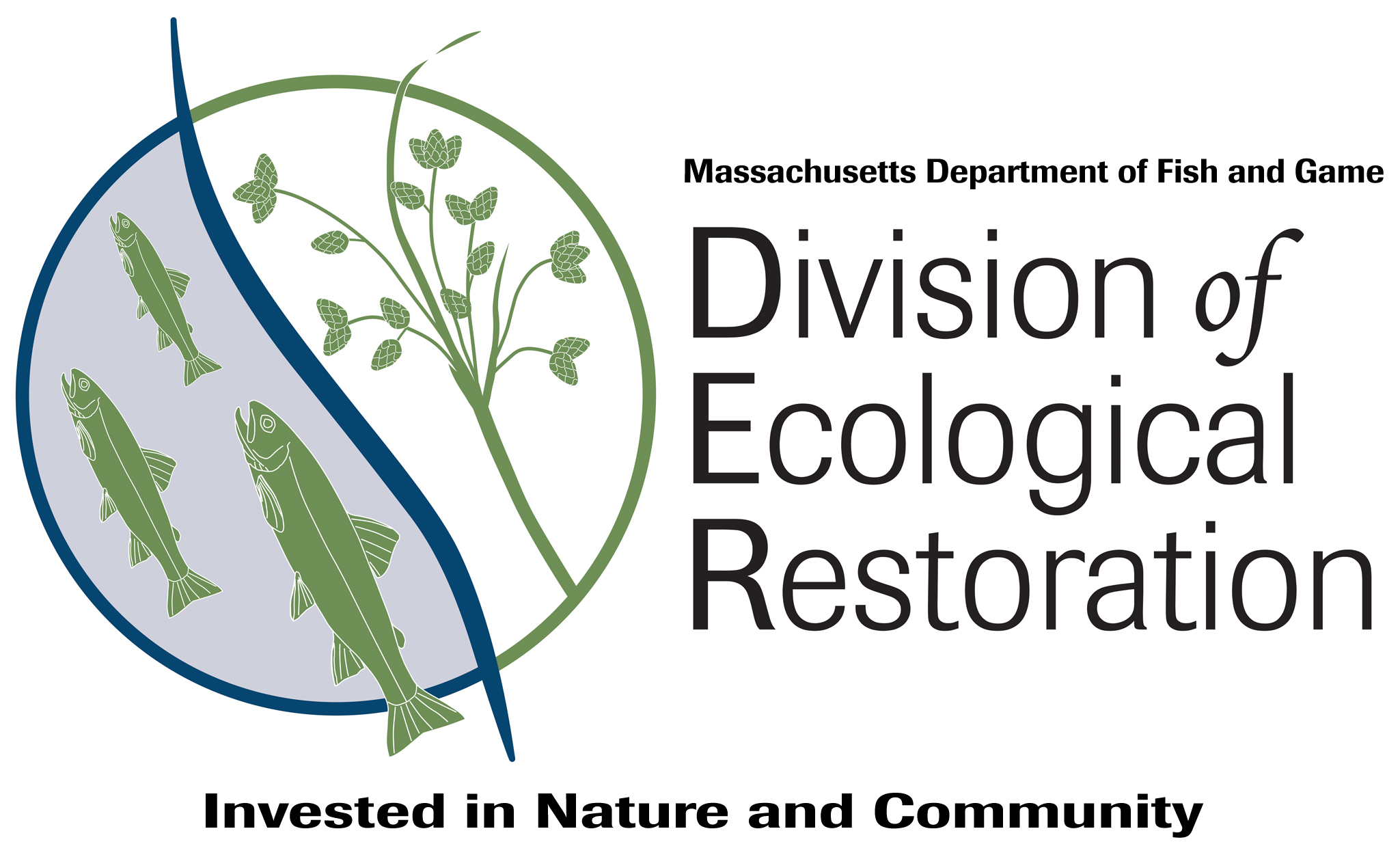
Division of Ecological Restoration seal

Beth Lambert currently serves as the director of the Division of Ecological Restoration. The founding director was Tim Purinton, who served in this role from 2009 to 2017.
