= Fall River (Connecticut River tributary) =

River in the United States of America

Coordinates: 42°36′50″N 72°33′8″W

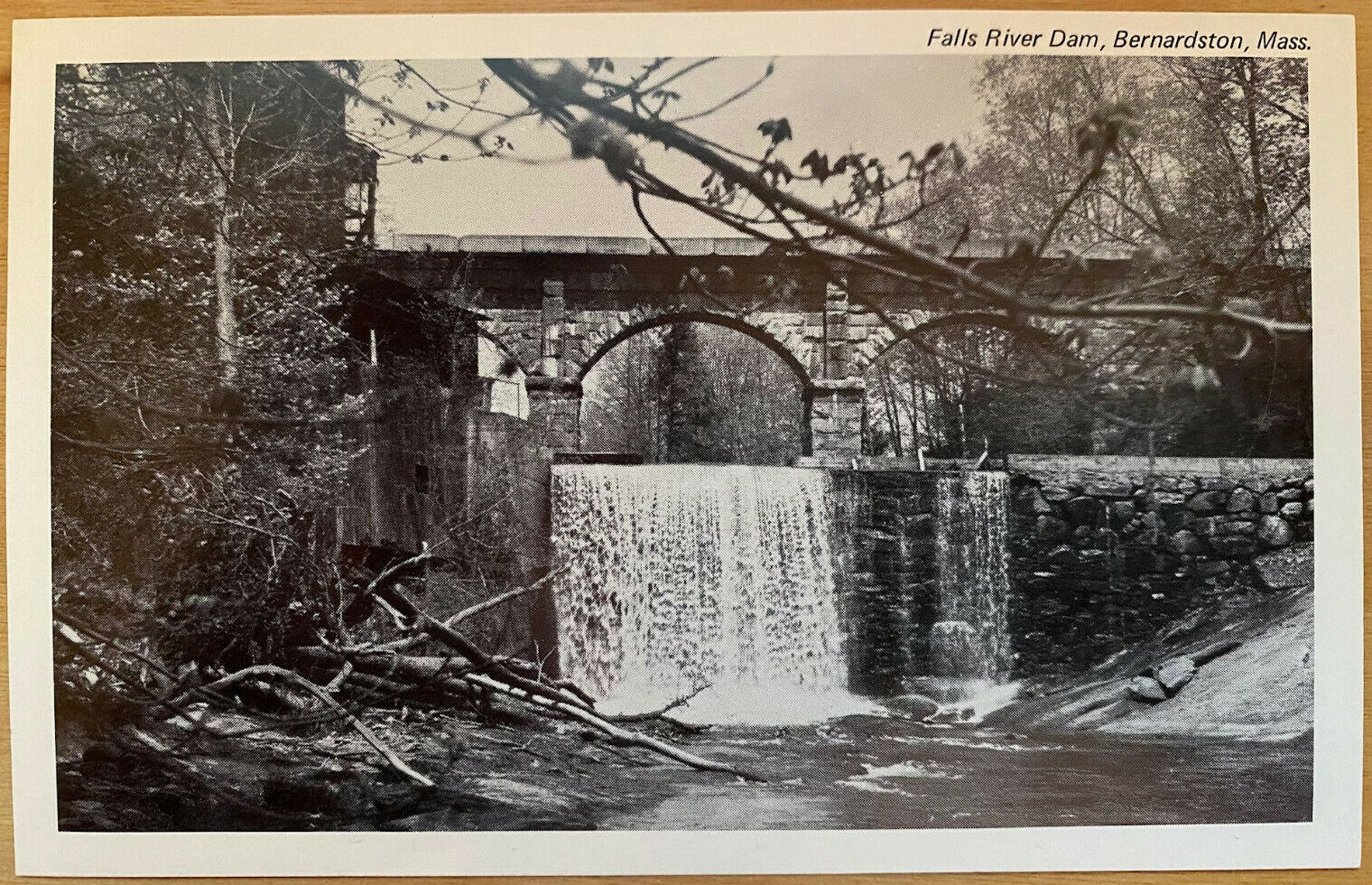
Dam and Connecticut River Line railroad bridge in Bernardston

The Fall River is a 14.1-mile-long (22.7 km) river in southern Vermont and northern Massachusetts, joining the Connecticut River just downstream from Turners Falls, Massachusetts.

The river rises on the eastern slopes of East Mountain in Guilford, Vermont, and flows southward into Bernardston, Massachusetts. For nearly its entire length in Bernardston it is followed by U.S. Route 5 and Interstate 91, flowing for most of that distance between the two highways. South of Bernardston the river forms the boundary between the town of Gill and the city of Greenfield. The Fall River enters the Connecticut River directly across from the village of Turners Falls within the town of Montague and just downstream from the Turners Falls dam.

== See also ==
- List of rivers of Massachusetts
