= Andes, New York =

Town in Delaware County, New York, US

- Town
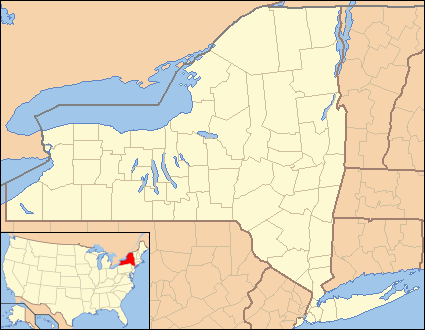
- Location of Andes in New York
- Coordinates: 42°11′20″N 74°47′09″W
- Country: United States
- State: New York
- County: Delaware

Government
  - Type: Town Council
  - Town Supervisor: Martin A. Donnelly (R)
  - Town Council: Members' List: • Thomas Hall (D); • Wayland 'Bud' Gladstone (D); • Daniel Grommeck (R); • Martin Liddle (R)

Area
  - Total: 112.36 sq mi (291.01 km^{2})
  - Land: 108.66 sq mi (281.44 km^{2})
  - Water: 3.69 sq mi (9.57 km^{2})
- Elevation: 1,600 ft (490 m)

Population (2020)
  - Total: 1,114
  - Density: 10.25/sq mi (3.958/km^{2})
- Time zone: Eastern (EST)
- ZIP Codes: 13731 (Andes); 13752 (Delancey); 12776 (Roscoe); 12455 (Margaretville)
- Area code: 845
- FIPS code: 36-025-02132
- GNIS code: 978680
- Website: andesnewyork.gov

Andes is a town in Delaware County, New York, United States. The population was 1,114 at the 2020 census.

The town of Andes contains a hamlet (formerly a village) also named Andes. The town is on the southeastern border of the county.

== History ==
Settlement began in 1784. The town was formed in 1819 breaking off from the Town of Middletown. Most of Delaware County, including Andes, became part of the Hardenbergh Patent, a manor which was owned by members of the Livingston family. The name of the town was the result of a jocular suggestion by Daniel H. Burr, who seeing that the new town was to include one of the hilliest sections of the county, said it ought to be called Andes. In 1845, in what became known as the Anti-Rent War, protesters, several hundred dressed as "Calico Indians", shot and killed Under-Sheriff Osman Steele, when he and deputies attempted to collect rent overdue to the lord of the manor of about $64. Hundreds of protesters were arrested and two were sentenced to death, but their sentences were later commuted.

On December 31, 2003, the incorporated village of Andes ceased to exist. During a special village election on June 3, 2002, the residents approved the dissolution of the village by a vote of 81 to 63.

The Jackson-Aitken Farm was listed on the National Register of Historic Places in 2003.

== Geography ==
Andes is located in southeastern Delaware County on the western edge of the Catskill Mountains. The southern town line is the border of Ulster County. Andes is partly in the Catskill Park.

According to the United States Census Bureau, the town has a total area of 112.7 square miles (291.8 km^{2}), of which 108.6 square miles (281.3 km^{2}) is land and 3.7 square miles (9.6 km^{2}), or 3.29%, is water. The Pepacton Reservoir, an impoundment on the East Branch Delaware River, crosses the south-central part of the town.

== Demographics ==
Historical population
Census	Pop.	Note	%±
1820	1,378		—
1830	1,859		34.9%
1840	2,176		17.1%
1850	2,672		22.8%
1860	2,990		11.9%
1870	2,840		−5.0%
1880	2,639		−7.1%
1890	2,264		−14.2%
1900	1,927		−14.9%
1910	2,007		4.2%
1920	1,922		−4.2%
1930	1,899		−1.2%
1940	1,687		−11.2%
1950	1,665		−1.3%
1960	1,274		−23.5%
1970	1,193		−6.4%
1980	1,312		10.0%
1990	1,291		−1.6%
2000	1,356		5.0%
2010	1,301		−4.1%
2020	1,114		−14.4%
U.S. Decennial Census

=== 2000 ===
As of the census of 2000, there were 1,356 people, 604 households, and 381 families residing in the town. The population density was 12.4 inhabitants per square mile (4.8/km^{2}). There were 1,326 housing units at an average density of 12.2 per square mile (4.7/km^{2}). The racial makeup of the town was 96.90% White, 0.44% Black or African American, 0.29% Native American, 0.59% people of Asian descent, 1.03% from people descended from other races, and 0.74% from two or more races. Hispanic or Latino of any race were 1.92% of the population.

There were 604 households, out of which 20.4% had children under the age of 18 living with them, 53.3% were married couples living together, 5.8% had a female householder with no husband present, and 36.8% were non-families. 31.8% of all households were made up of individuals, and 14.6% had someone living alone who was 65 years of age or older. The average household size was 2.25 and the average family size was 2.77.

In the town, the population was spread out, with 18.4% under the age of 18, 6.3% from 18 to 24, 21.4% from 25 to 44, 32.4% from 45 to 64, and 21.6% who were 65 years of age or older. The median age was 48 years. For every 100 females, there were 104.8 males. For every 100 females age 18 and over, there were 107.7 males.

The median income for a household in the town was $35,119, and the median income for a family was $39,474. Males had a median income of $28,074 versus $22,847 for females. The per capita income for the town was $20,650. About 6.1% of families and 9.4% of the population were below the poverty line, including 14.4% of those under age 18 and 6.8% of those age 65 or over.

== Education ==
At the center of the Andes community is Andes Central School. The Andes school system is one of the smallest public schools in New York State, in 2019, it served 65 students, K-12.

== Communities and locations in Andes ==
- Andes – The hamlet of Andes, is on Route 28 in the northern part of the town.
- Pepacton Reservoir – A reservoir partly inside the town.
- Shavertown – A community lost to the reservoir.
- Union Grove – A community lost to the reservoir.

== Notable people ==
Notable current and former residents of Andes include:

- Ira Black (1941–2006), neuroscientist and stem cell researcher who served as the first director of the Stem Cell Institute of New Jersey.
- Susan Dey (born 1952), actress who moved to the area in 2007.
- Kathryn Krick (born 1991), Pentecostal pastor and social media personality

== Climate ==
This climatic region is typified by large seasonal temperature differences, with warm to hot (and often humid) summers and cold (sometimes severely cold) winters. According to the Köppen Climate Classification system, Andes has a humid continental climate, abbreviated "Dfb" on climate maps.
