= Cocasset River =

River in Foxborough, Massachusetts, US

Coordinates: 42°2′33.5″N 71°16′16.4″W

The Cocasset River is a small river in Foxborough, Massachusetts. It flows approximately 4.7 miles (7.5 km) in a southwesterly direction to where it joins the Wading River near Green Street. It is a tributary of the Taunton River.

== See also ==
- Taunton River Watershed
