= Andes (CDP), New York =

Andes, New York
- Census-designated place
- Location within New York
- Coordinates: 42°11′19″N 074°47′09″W
- Country: United States
- State: New York
- County: Delaware County
- Town: Andes
- Incorporated: January 3, 1861
- Dissolved: December 31, 2003

Area
  - Total: 1.40 sq mi (3.62 km^{2})
  - Land: 1.40 sq mi (3.62 km^{2})
  - Water: 0 sq mi (0.00 km^{2})
- Elevation: 1,598 ft (487 m)

Population (2020)
  - Total: 189
  - Density: 135.1/sq mi (52.18/km^{2})
- Time zone: UTC-5 (Eastern (EST))
  - Summer (DST): UTC-4 (EDT)
- ZIP code: 13731
- Area code: 845
- FIPS code: 36-02121
- GNIS feature ID: 942462

Andes is a hamlet and census-designated place (CDP) in Delaware County, New York, United States. The population was 189 at the 2020 census. It was formerly a village.

Andes is located on Route 28 and is the only significant community in the town of Andes.

== History ==
The village was almost destroyed by a fire in 1878.

It is the location of the Andes Historic District and Andes Railroad Station, both listed on the National Register of Historic Places.

During a special village election on June 3, 2002, the residents approved the dissolution of the village by a vote of 81 to 63. On December 31, 2003, the incorporated village of Andes ceased to exist.

== Geography ==
The hamlet of Andes is located in the northern part of the town of Andes at 42°11′19″N 074°47′09″W (42.1886976, -74.7857138). Its elevation is 1,598 feet (487 m). New York Route 28 leads northwest 12 miles (19 km) to Delhi, the Delaware County seat, and southeast 11 miles (18 km) to Margaretville.

According to the United States Census Bureau, the Andes CDP has a total area of 1.2 square miles (3.1 km^{2}), all land.

== Demographics ==
Historical population
Census	Pop.	Note	%±
2010	252		—
2020	189		−25.0%
U.S. Decennial Census

As of the census of 2000, there were 289 people, 132 households, and 76 families residing in the village. The population density was 253.1 inhabitants per square mile (97.7/km^{2}). There were 161 housing units at an average density of 141.0 per square mile (54.4/km^{2}). The racial makeup of the village was 96.89% White, 0.69% Black or African American, 0.35% Asian, 1.73% from other races, and 0.35% from two or more races. Hispanic or Latino of any race were 3.11% of the population.

There were 132 households, out of which 22.7% had children under the age of 18 living with them, 46.2% were married couples living together, 6.1% had a female householder with no husband present, and 42.4% were non-families. 37.9% of all households were made up of individuals, and 21.2% had someone living alone who was 65 years of age or older. The average household size was 2.19 and the average family size was 2.87.

In the village, the population was spread out, with 18.7% under the age of 18, 10.7% from 18 to 24, 25.6% from 25 to 44, 22.1% from 45 to 64, and 22.8% who were 65 years of age or older. The median age was 42 years. For every 100 females, there were 114.1 males. For every 100 females age 18 and over, there were 115.6 males.

The median income for a household in the village was $32,857, and the median income for a family was $47,500. Males had a median income of $28,281 versus $23,333 for females. The per capita income for the village was $22,716. About 6.8% of families and 7.6% of the population were below the poverty line, including 3.6% of those under the age of eighteen and 2.7% of those 65 or over.

== Media coverage ==
Andes was the subject of a 2009 opinion piece in The New York Times and a 2011 article in the New York Post.
