= Pepacton Reservoir =

Reservoir in Delaware County, New York

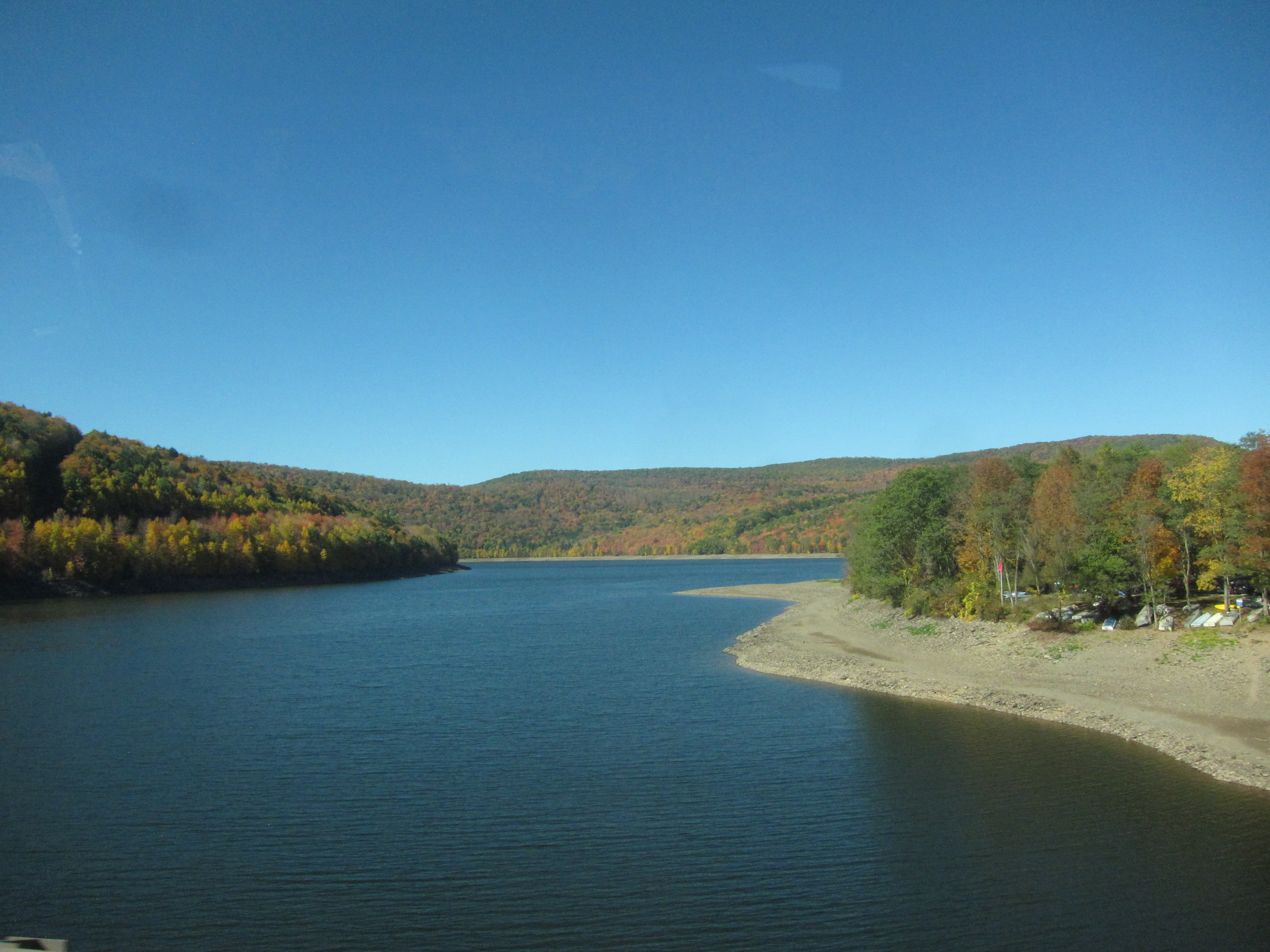
- Pepacton reservoir at Route 30 bridge

- Location within New York Pepacton Reservoir (the United States)
- Location: Delaware County, New York
- Coordinates: 42°05′20″N 74°49′20″W
- Type: Reservoir
- Primary inflows: East Branch of the Delaware River
- Basin countries: United States
- Max. length: 15 mi (24 km)
- Max. width: 0.7 mi (1.1 km)
- Surface area: 5,726 acres (23.17 km^{2})
- Max. depth: 180 ft (55 m)
- Water volume: 140.2 billion U.S. gallons (531 million cubic meters)
- Surface elevation: 1,280 ft (390 m)

The Pepacton Reservoir is a reservoir in the New York City water supply system located in Delaware County, New York. Lying in the Catskill Mountains on the East Branch of the Delaware River, it was formed by the construction of Downsville Dam, and impounds over one-quarter of the tributary's flow.

== Description ==
The reservoir lies 12 miles (19 km) south of the village of Delhi and is 101 miles (163 km) northwest of New York City. It is narrow and winding, some 15 miles (24 km) long and about 0.7 miles (1.1 km) across at its widest point. The reservoir is over 160 feet (49 m) deep at its maximum point and contains 140.2 billion U.S. gallons (531 million cubic meters) of water at full capacity. This makes it the city water system's largest reservoir by volume.

Pepacton Reservoir supplies New York City with nearly 25% of its drinking water. Its water empties into the 25.5-mile (41.0 km) East Delaware Tunnel near the former site of Pepacton, then flows through the aqueduct into the Rondout Reservoir, which empties into the 85-mile (137 km) Delaware Aqueduct. Flow is then routed under the Hudson into the West Branch Reservoir in Putnam County, New York, then on to the Kensico Reservoir in Westchester County just north of The Bronx. From there the aqueduct continues on to Hillview Reservoir, from which it is distributed by tunnel to users in the City.

Peapackton is a Lenape Native American term meaning "marriage of the waters". The reservoir lies on land New York City purchased in the valley in 1942, and led to the displacement of 974 people, destruction of four hamlets (Arena, Pepacton, Shavertown and Union Grove), and submersion of nearly one-quarter of the Delaware and Northern Railroad in the process. The dam, located at Downsville, was finished in 1954, and the flooding was completed in 1955.

The reservoir is a significant factor in the local economy of Downsville, as thousands of tourists travel to Downsville each year to fish for trout. No motor boats are allowed on the reservoir; non-motorized boats that have been steam-cleaned and that have required tags may be used in the reservoir during the summer.

== Tributaries ==
- Mill Brook
- Barkaboom Stream
- Lower Beach Hill Brook
- Holliday Brook
- Bryden Hill Brook
- Murphy Hill Brook
- Flynn Brook
- Tremper Kill
- Bush Kill

== See also ==
- List of reservoirs and dams in New York
