= Arena, New York =

- Hamlet
- Location within the state of New York
- Coordinates: 42°06′56″N 74°44′15″W
- Country: United States
- State: New York
- County: Delaware
- Town: Middletown
- Elevation: 1,283 ft (391 m)
- Time zone: UTC-5 (Eastern (EST))
  - Summer (DST): UTC-4 (EDT)

Arena is a hamlet in Delaware County, New York, United States. It is located southwest of Margaretville on the eastern end of Pepacton Reservoir.
