= Downsville, New York =

- Census-designated place
- Location within New York
- Coordinates: 42°4′51″N 74°59′44″W
- Country: United States
- State: New York
- County: Delaware
- Town: Colchester

Area
  - Total: 4.47 sq mi (11.58 km^{2})
  - Land: 4.39 sq mi (11.38 km^{2})
  - Water: 0.081 sq mi (0.21 km^{2})
- Elevation: 1,125 ft (343 m)

Population (2020)
  - Total: 474
  - Density: 107.9/sq mi (41.67/km^{2})
- Time zone: UTC-5 (Eastern (EST))
  - Summer (DST): UTC-4 (EDT)
- ZIP Codes: 13755 (Downsville); 13782 (Hamden)
- Area code: Area code 607
- FIPS code: 36-20852
- GNIS feature ID: 948622

Downsville is a hamlet, census-designated place (CDP), and former village in the town of Colchester, Delaware County, New York, United States. The population was 474 at the 2020 census.

== History ==
It is the site of the Downsville Bridge, a covered bridge, and the historic Union Free School. Both are listed on the National Register of Historic Places.

Downsville is named for Abel Downs, who had a tannery there. The hamlet is located on the East Branch of the Delaware River. A dam on this portion of the river, at Downsville, was completed by workers paid for by New York City in 1954, creating the Pepacton Reservoir, which is part of the New York City water supply system. The Delaware and Northern Railroad ran south of town. There was a station on Depot Street.

Downsville Central School, located on Maple Avenue, serves families from the surrounding areas, including municipalities as far away as East Branch. Downsville Central School's colors are purple and white and their mascot is the Eagle.

== Geography ==
Downsville is located in the northern part of the town of Colchester, along Downs Brook just north of its confluence with the East Branch Delaware River. New York State Route 30 passes through the hamlet, leading southwest 15 miles (24 km) to the hamlet of East Branch at NY 17, and east 26 miles (42 km) along the Pepacton Reservoir to Margaretville. New York State Route 206 leads northwest from Downsville 10 miles (16 km) to Walton and southeast 14 miles (23 km) to NY 17 at Roscoe.

According to the United States Census Bureau, the Downsville CDP has a total area of 4.0 square miles (10.4 km^{2}), of which 3.9 square miles (10.2 km^{2}) is land and 0.1 square miles (0.2 km^{2}), or 1.97%, is water.

== Demographics ==
Historical population
Census	Pop.	Note	%±
2010	617		—
2020	474		−23.2%
U.S. Decennial Census
