= First Presbyterian Church of Margaretville =

Historic church in New York, United States

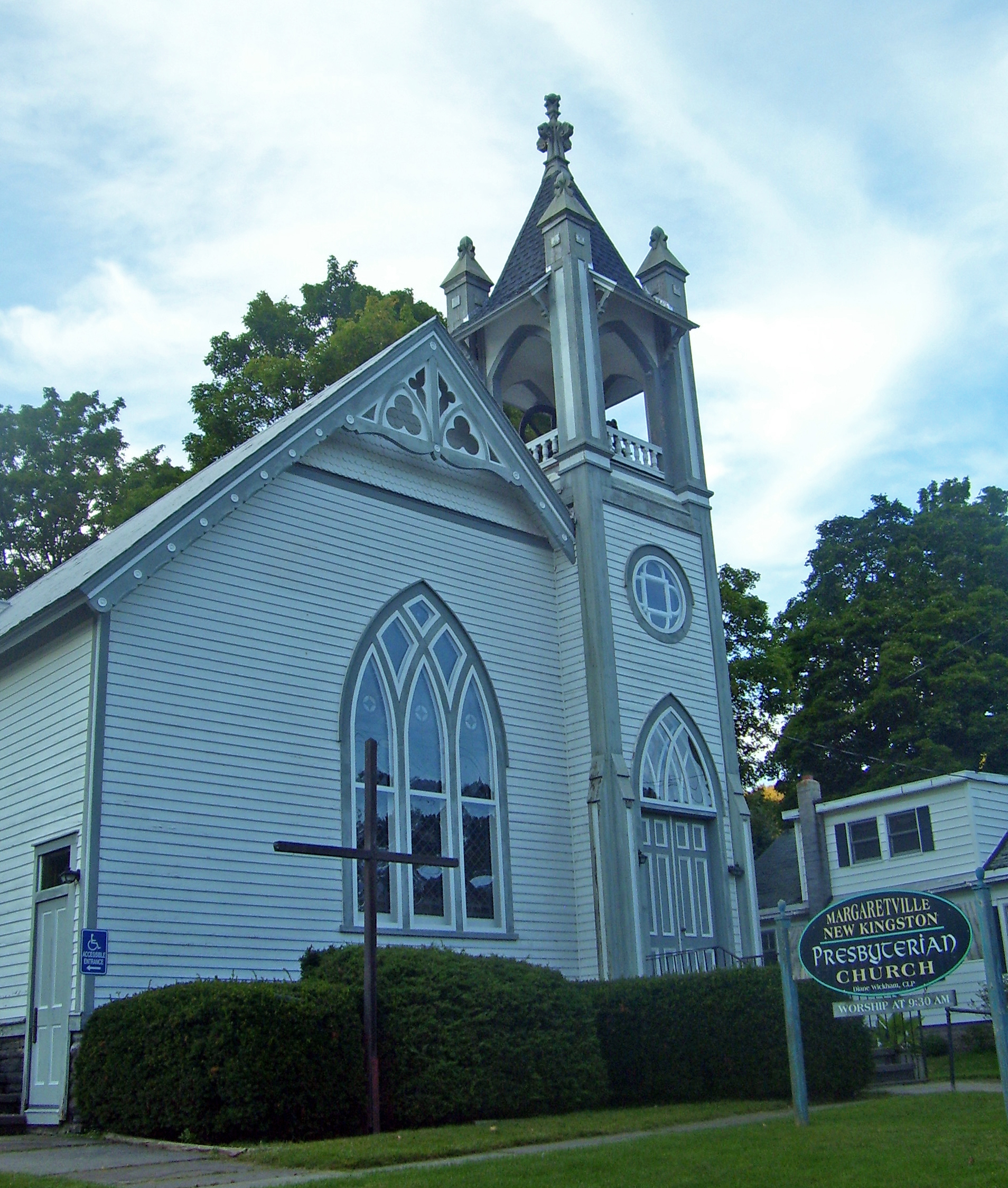
- East elevation, 2008

Religion
- Affiliation: Presbyterian

Location
- Location: Margaretville, New York, US
- Interactive map of First Presbyterian Church of Margaretville
- Coordinates: 42°8′57″N 74°39′6″W

Architecture
- Type: Church
- Style: Late Victorian
- Groundbreaking: 1894
- Completed: 1894

Specifications
- Direction of façade: East
- Materials: Wood, stone, metal

U.S. National Register of Historic Places
- Added to NRHP: 2004
- NRHP Reference no.: 04000348

The First Presbyterian Church of Margaretville, now Margaretville New Kingston Presbyterian Church, is located on Orchard Street in Margaretville, New York, United States. It is an ornate wooden church built late in the 19th century.

It was built shortly after the congregation was established using the "open plan" interior favored by revivalists of the area as more conducive to worship. A rear wing was built on the church in the 1960s. Besides that modification, it has remained mostly intact since then. In 2004 it was listed on the National Register of Historic Places.

== Building ==
The church is situated on the northern corner of Orchard and Mountain streets. The land here begins to slope toward the Catskill peaks west of the village. The church's lot is elevated slightly above street level, giving it a good view of Pakatakan Mountain, the west end of Dry Brook Ridge, and other scenery east of the village. The neighborhood is otherwise residential. A slate walk and stairs lead up to the church from Orchard Street. There is a parking lot on the west side of the church next to Mountain Street.

The building itself is a frame structure on a rusticated stone foundation with full basement. Its clapboard-sided walls rise to a steeply pitched gabled metal roof with overhanging eaves. The gable fields have fish-scale shingle siding; the roof's cornice is decorated with scroll-sawn vergeboards in a trefoil pattern and supporting brackets.

On the southeast corner is an engaged square two-stage bell tower. It, too, is sided in clapboard with wide wooden cornerboards above paneled pilasters and a wide wooden frieze. On its first stage, two double paneled doors, the main entrance, are topped with a lancet arched transom with tracery on the south and a single lancet window on the east. A circular window with tracery tops both. The upper stage has the belfry, with lancet arched balustrades and paneled corner piers topped with pinnacles above the eaves. The wood-shingled pyramidal roof is topped with a crocket.

The south (front) facade has a single tripartite lancet arch stained glass window. A cross-gable gives both side elevations projecting bays with narrow lancet arched windows. Each has a religious motif, such as a Bible, cross, or dove in stained glass at the top. Near the front on the west side is a second double-doored entrance reached by a set of stone steps and, at ground level, a single door providing access to the basement at the corner. The rear addition, a one-story frame block with gabled roof constructed perpendicular to the main block, obscures most of the original north elevation but a circular window depicting Jesus remains.

Both entrances lead into small vestibules, where another set of double wooden paneled doors opens into the auditorium, a single open space with curved pews divided into three sets of rows by side aisles, and straight pews at the rear. The walls are sided in beadboard to the chair rail and plaster above. The ceiling follows the gable from the plate but is flat.

A platform at the west end is raised 20 inches (51 cm) off the floor and faced in beadboard as well. A wooden rail with velvet curtain sets off the edges. It has a lectern in the center and space for a choir at the east. Its furniture, apparently original, includes carved Eastlake chairs and a communion table, in addition to a piano and organ. To the west is the community room, a large open space with kitchen and bathrooms partitioned off at the end.

== History ==
The congregation was organized in 1891 in response to an expressed need in Margaretville for a Presbyterian church, especially with farmers from nearby New Kingston who had worshipped at the church there moving to the village upon retirement. Members met at first in the local Baptist church; a committee was formed to find a church site the following year, 1892. The current parcel, on what was then known as Doolittle Avenue, was selected.

Two years later, in 1894, the church was completed and opened. Architecturally, it is similar to other contemporary Presbyterian churches in Delaware County, such as New Kingston and West Kortright, both also listed on the National Register. All are of frame construction, with corner bell towers and an eclectic assortment of features from various Victorian architectural styles. The architect of the Margaretville church is not known, but the design is very similar to one in a popular pattern book of Benjamin Price designs sponsored by the American Methodist Church, lacking only a Sunday school from the original. The tower is an exact replica of the one at St. Mark's Baptist Church in Highland Falls, on the Hudson River.

The interior followed the auditorium plan advocated by contemporary Revivalists as ideal for worship. They emphasized the importance of individual conversion in the Christian experience and wanted a space, similar to those found at camp meetings of the era, in which every member of the congregation could make individual face contact with the preacher. The curved pews, radiating aisles and corner entrances maximized interior space, echoing the tents of the camp meeting. The platform brought the preacher down from his high pulpit to closer contact with the worshippers, and gave him space to move around and keep the audience focused. Music, texture and color were also used for the same purpose, and these are seen in the beaded walls and stained glass windows.

Since its construction, there have been few changes to the church. The most significant has been the addition of the rear wing in 1964 for Sunday school. It required an entrance cut in the rear of the building, and about ten feet (3.0 m) was cut off the platform to make room. Lights and carpeting have also been installed.

== See also ==
- National Register of Historic Places listings in Delaware County, New York
