= Jacques Reich =

Hungarian-born American etcher (1852–1923)

- Born: August 10, 1852; Waniskoltz, Austrian Empire
- Died: July 8, 1923 (aged 70); Dunraven, New York, United States
- Education: National Academy of Design, Pennsylvania Academy of Fine Arts
- Occupation: Etcher
- Spouse: Caroline Bellinger
- Children: 3

Jakab "Jacques" Reich (10 August 1852 – 8 July 1923) was a Hungarian portrait etcher, active mainly in the United States.

== Biography ==
Jakab was born in Vaniskóc in Sáros, Kingdom of Hungary, situated in present-day Slovakia. He first studied art in Budapest. In 1873, he came to the United States and continued his studies at the National Academy of Design in New York and the Pennsylvania Academy of Fine Arts in Philadelphia. In 1879, he went to Paris to study for a year under the noted painters William-Adolphe Bouguereau and Joseph Nicolas Robert-Fleury. It is likely at this time that Jakab changed his name to be known professionally as "Jacques."

In 1880, Reich returned to Philadelphia, and in 1885 moved to New York and established a studio there. For some years he devoted himself to portraits for Appletons' Cyclopædia of American Biography, numbering over 2,000, and most of the portraits for Scribner’s Cyclopedia of Painters and Paintings. In addition he made many pen and ink illustrations for magazines and text books.

In the early nineties, he turned to etchings on copper and specialized in this field for over 25 years. He etched and published some 14 portraits of American and English authors, poets and artists, and a series of portraits of Famous Americans number some 25 subjects. In addition he executed many private commissions for etched portraits, among them Whitelaw Reid, E. H. Harriman, H. H. Rogers, Nelson W. Aldrich, Charles B. Alexander, John William Mackay, George William Curtis, John Paul Jones, President William McKinley, and President Grover Cleveland.

In 1892, he married Caroline Bellinger, daughter of Emil Bellinger of Frankfurt, Germany. He then became a resident of New Dorp, Staten Island, and lived there until his death. Jacques and Caroline had three sons: Oswald David (1892-1978), Walter (1894-1977), and Herbert Joseph (b. 1900). He died on July 8, 1923, in Dunraven, New York.

== Gallery ==
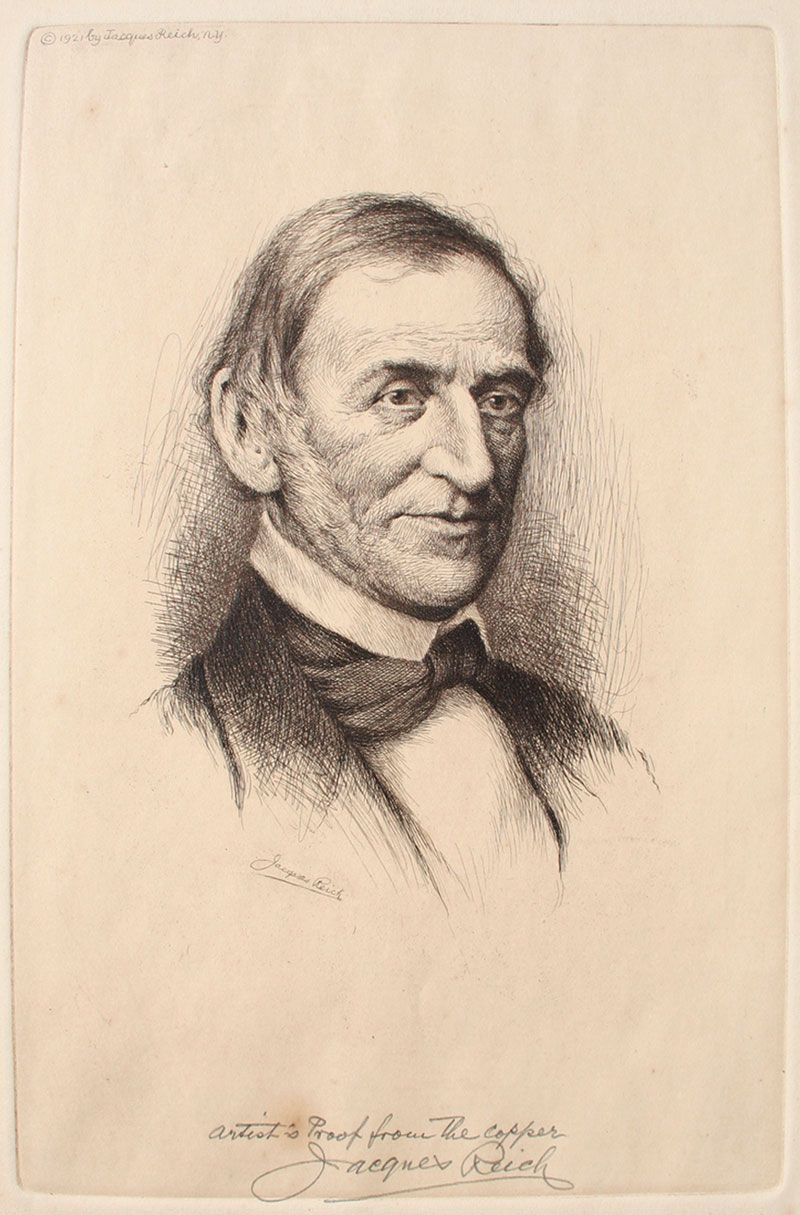

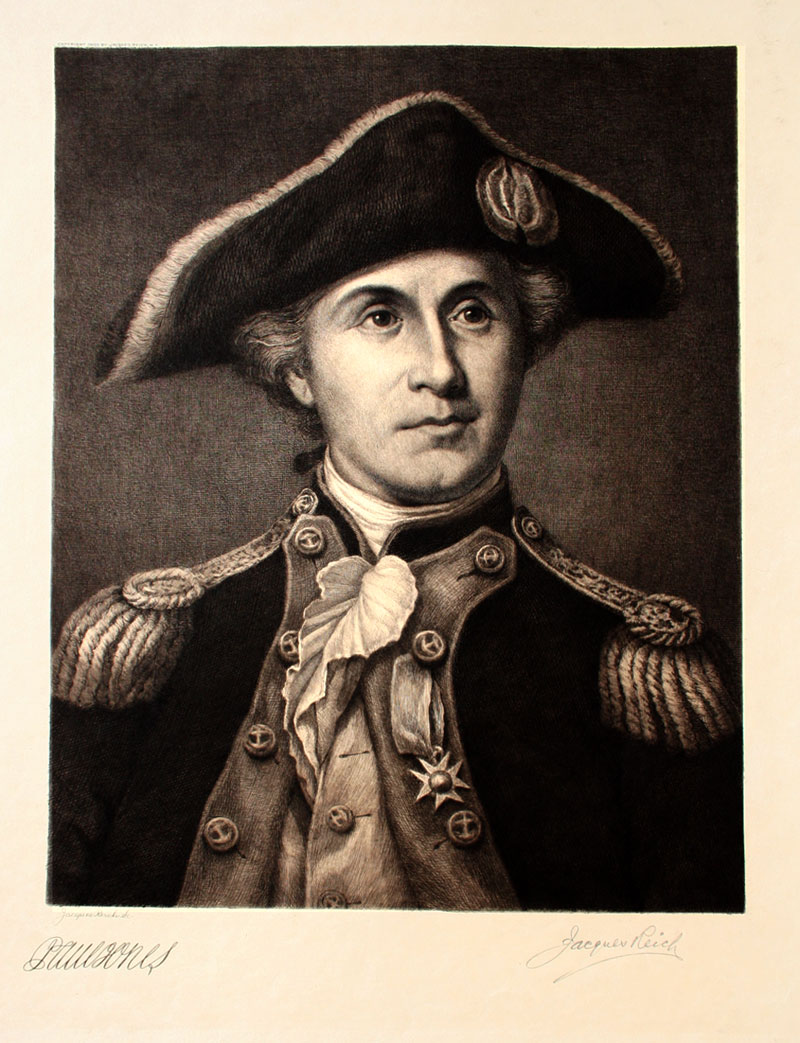

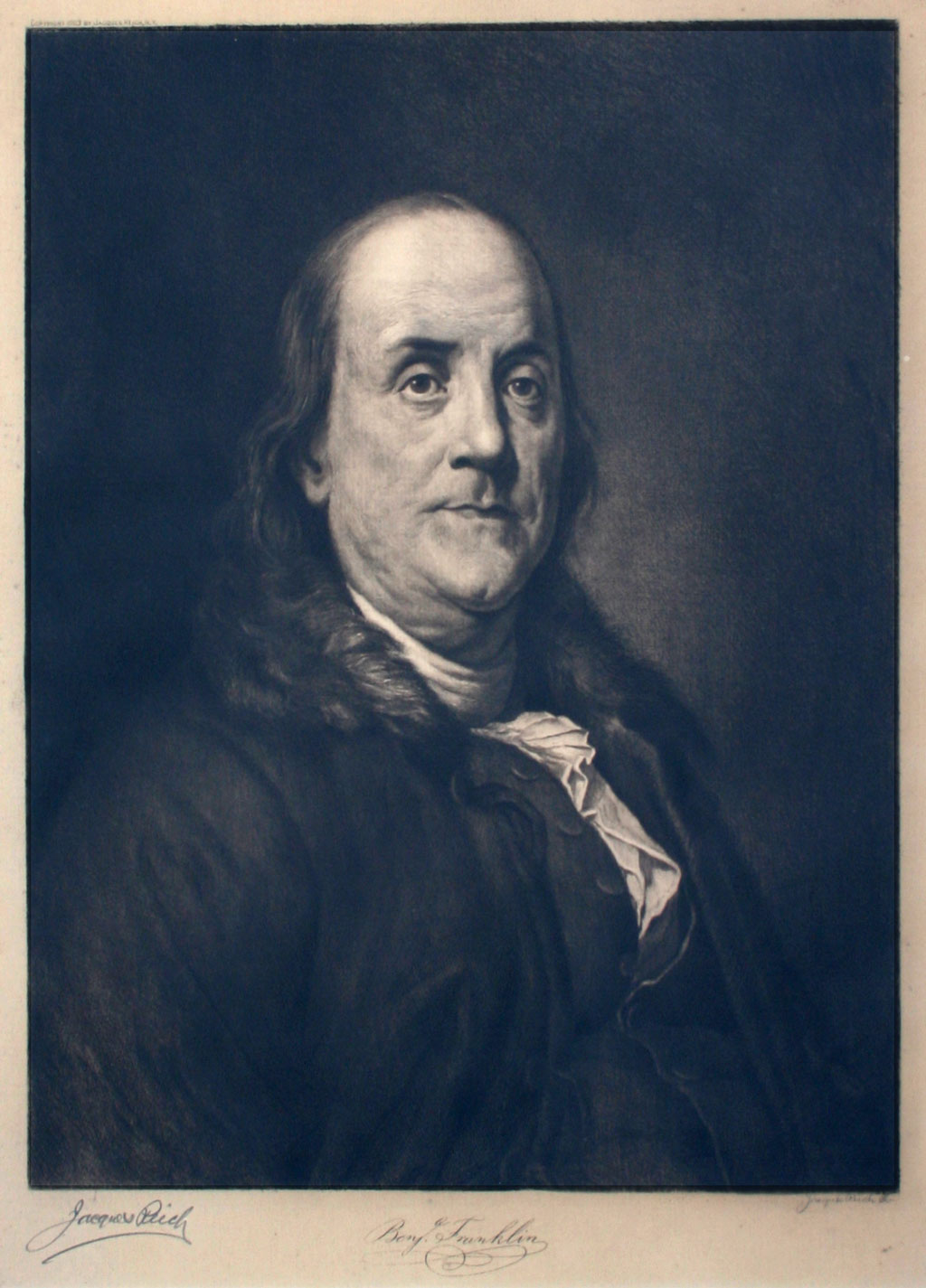

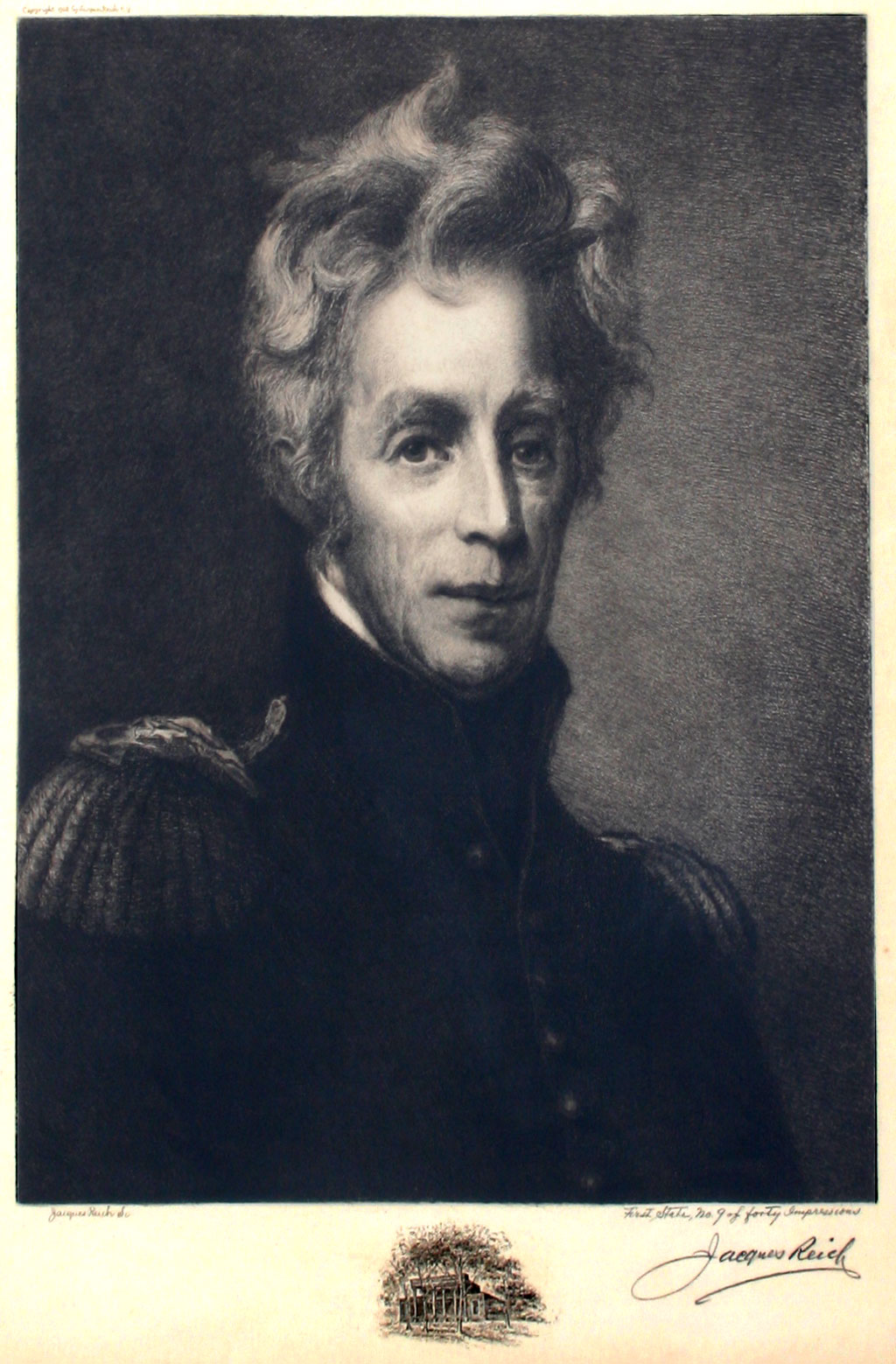

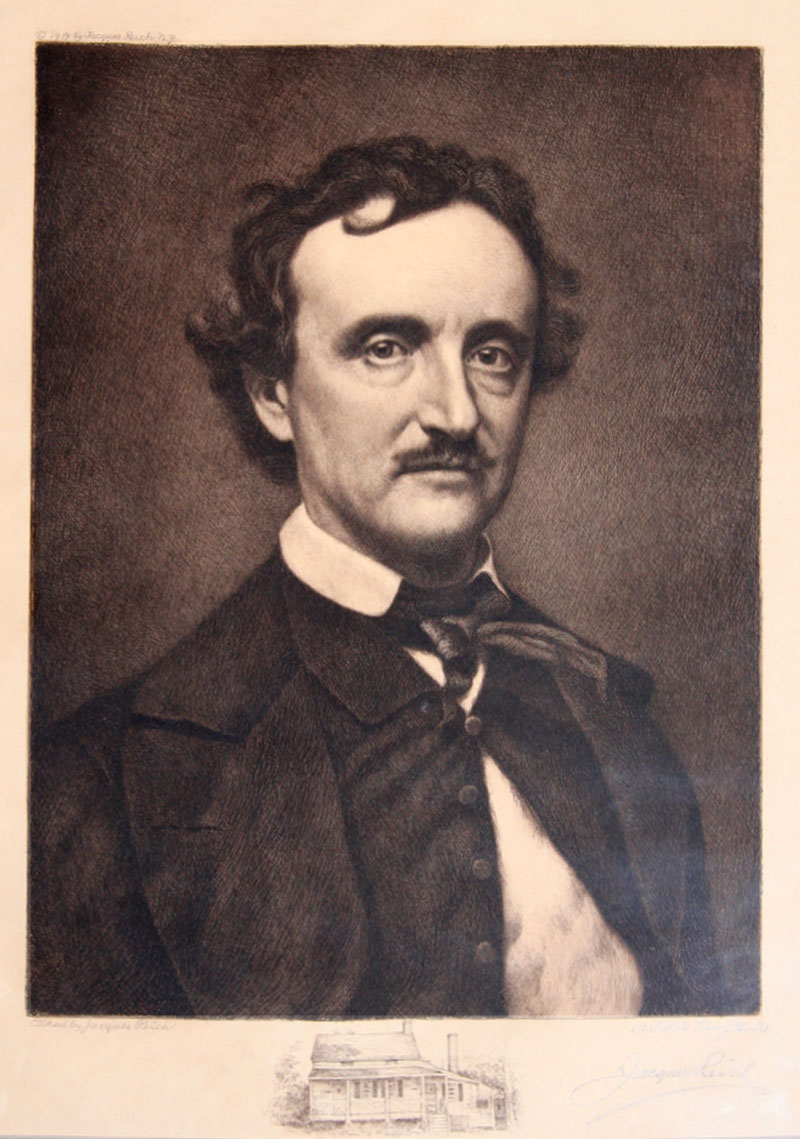

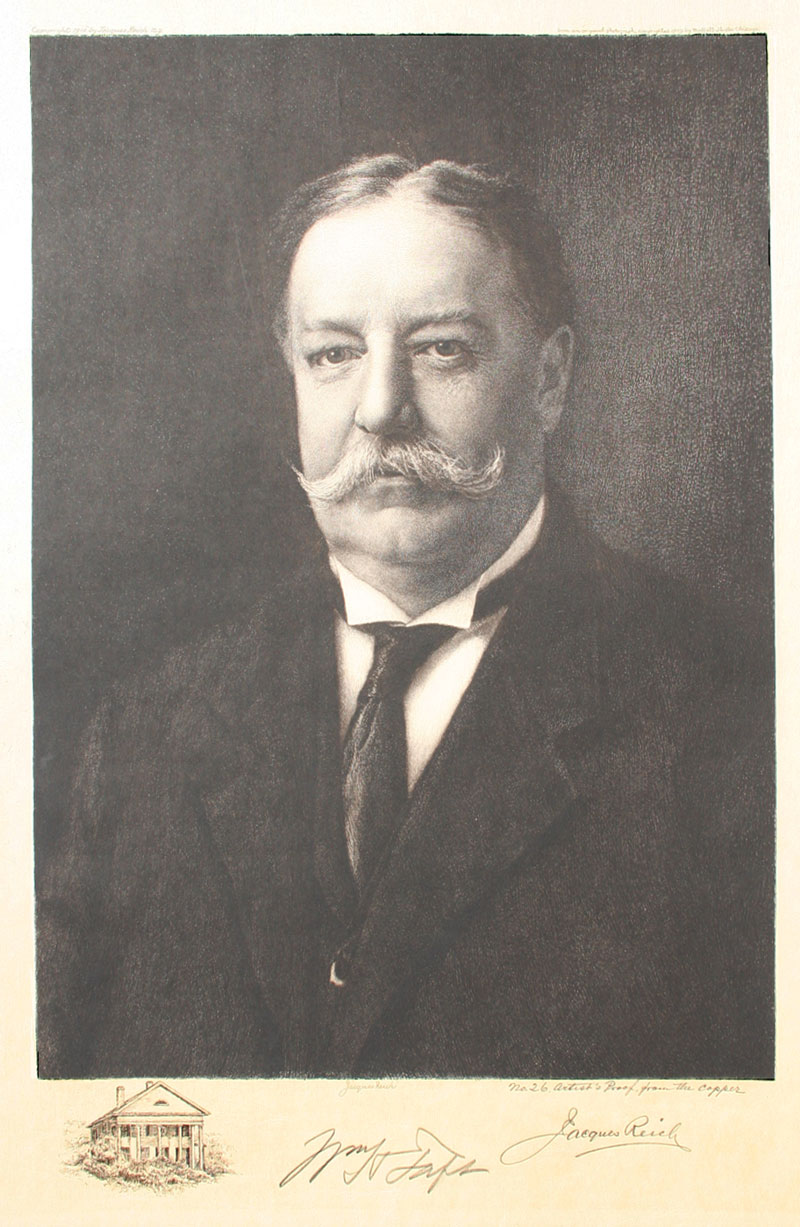

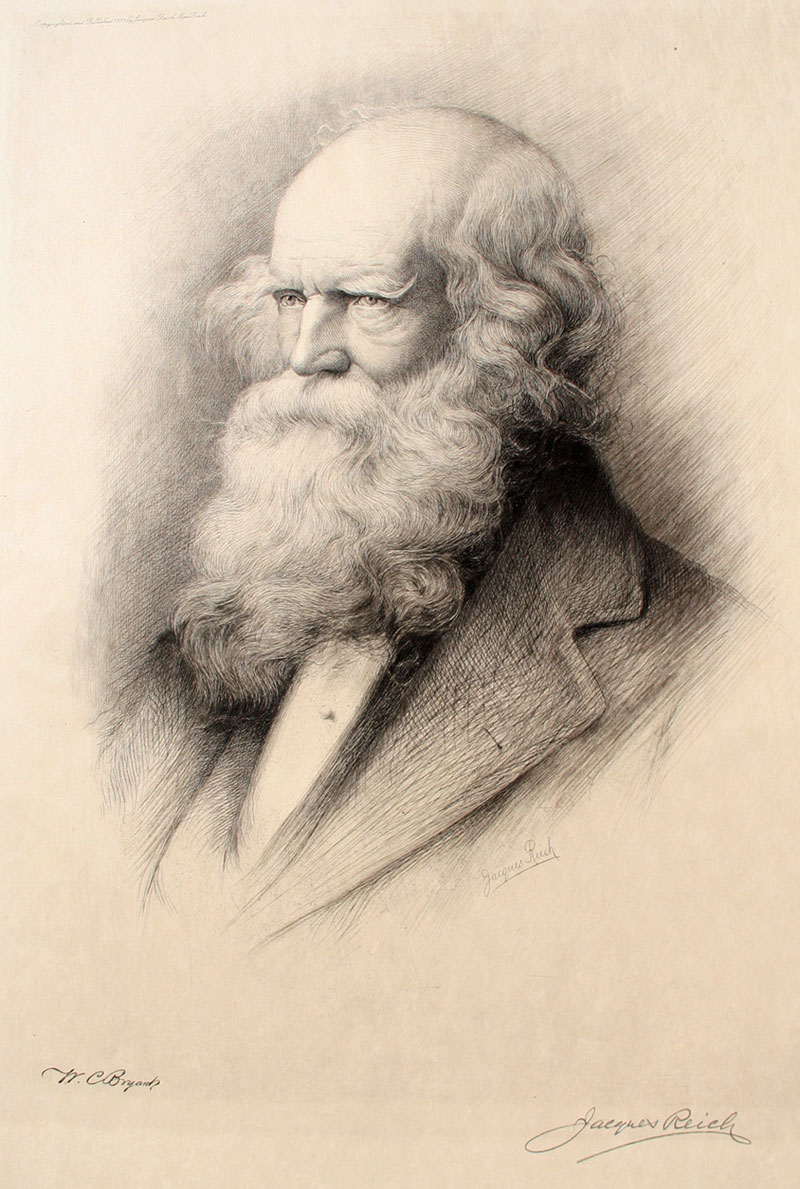

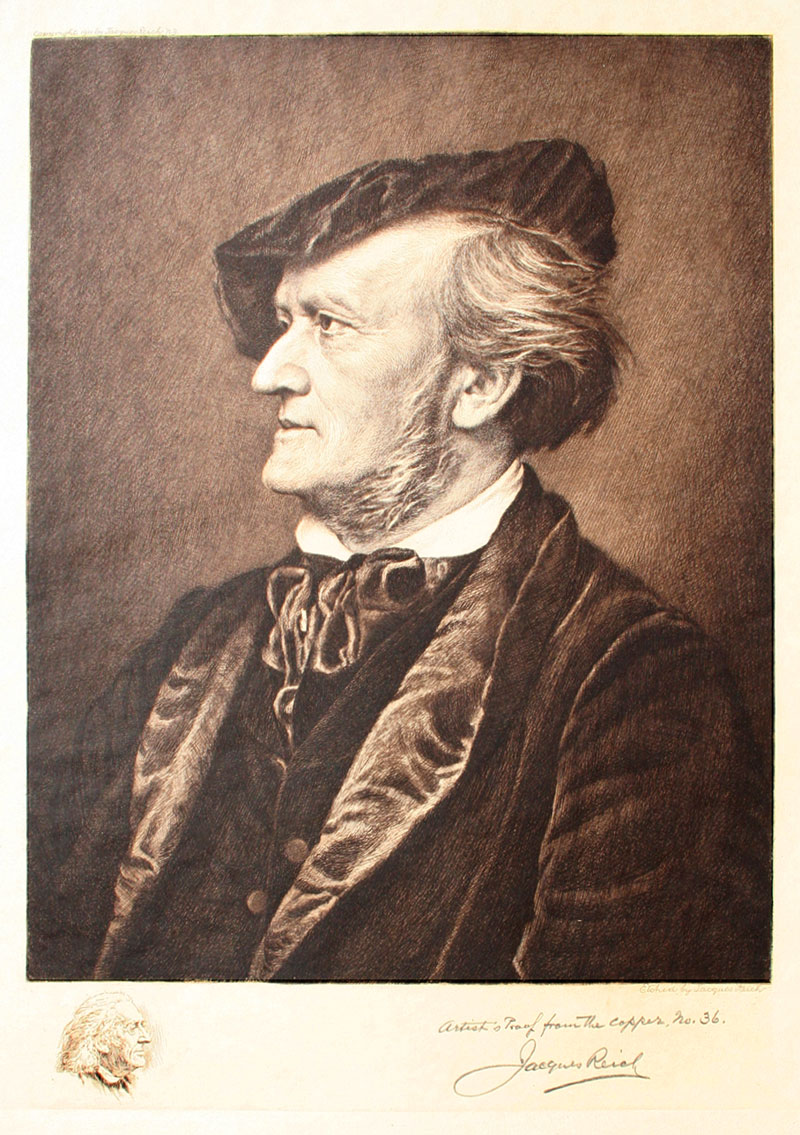

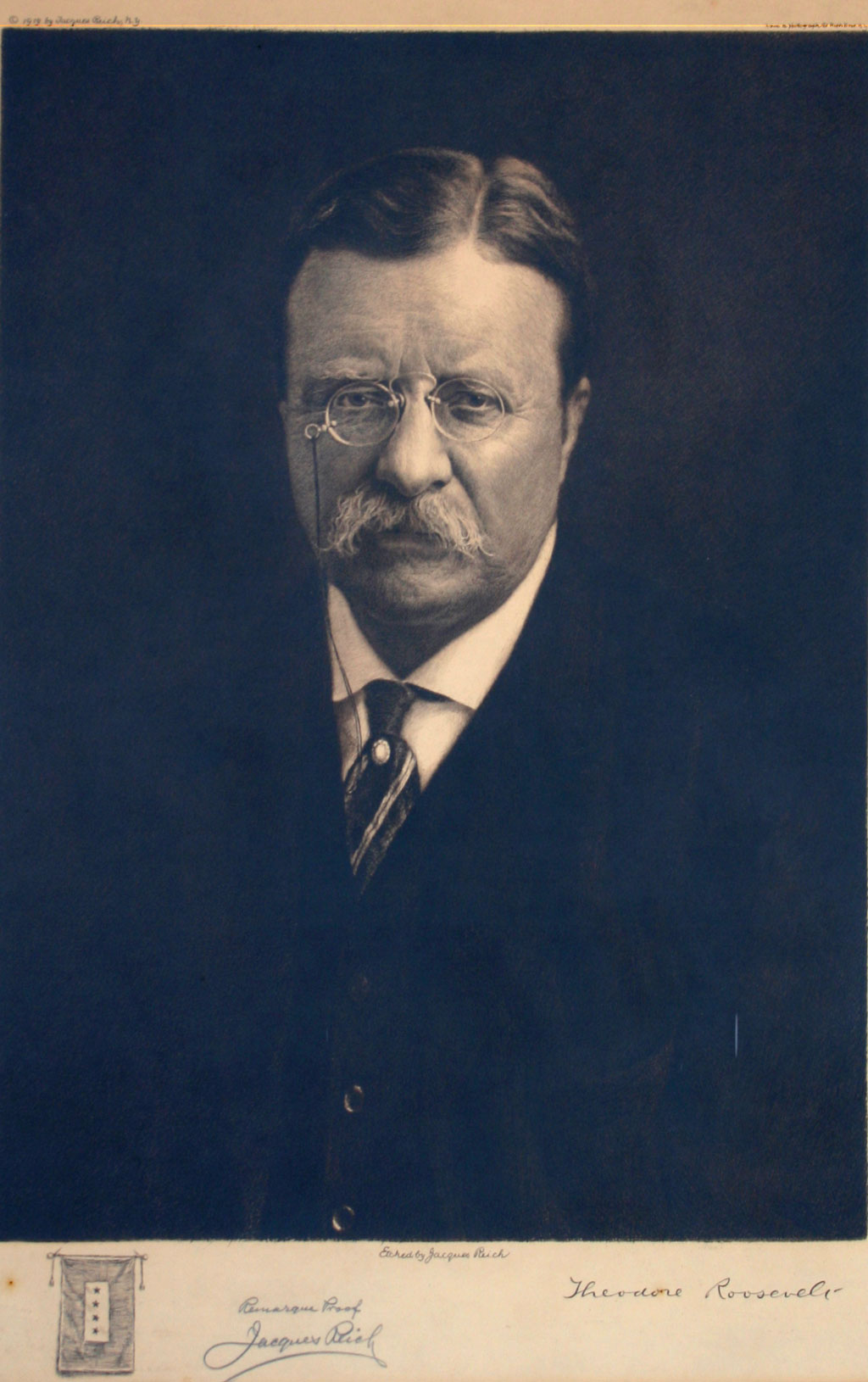

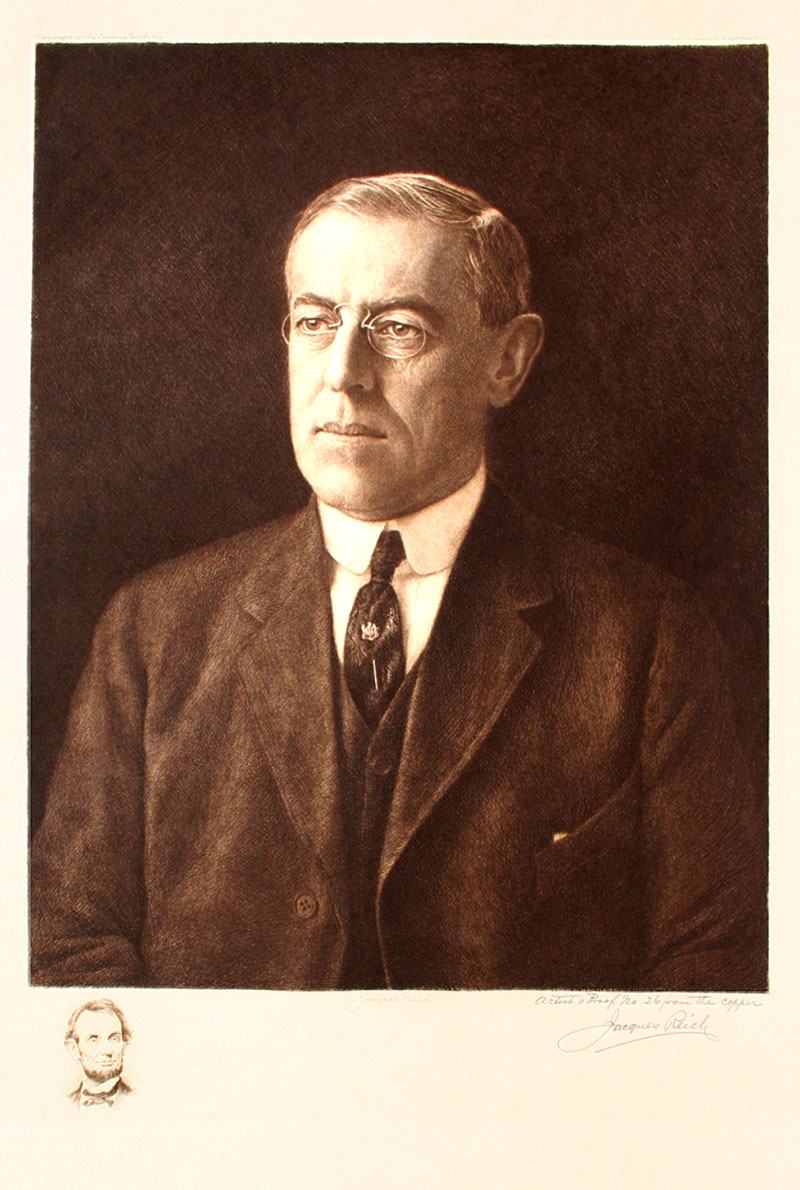

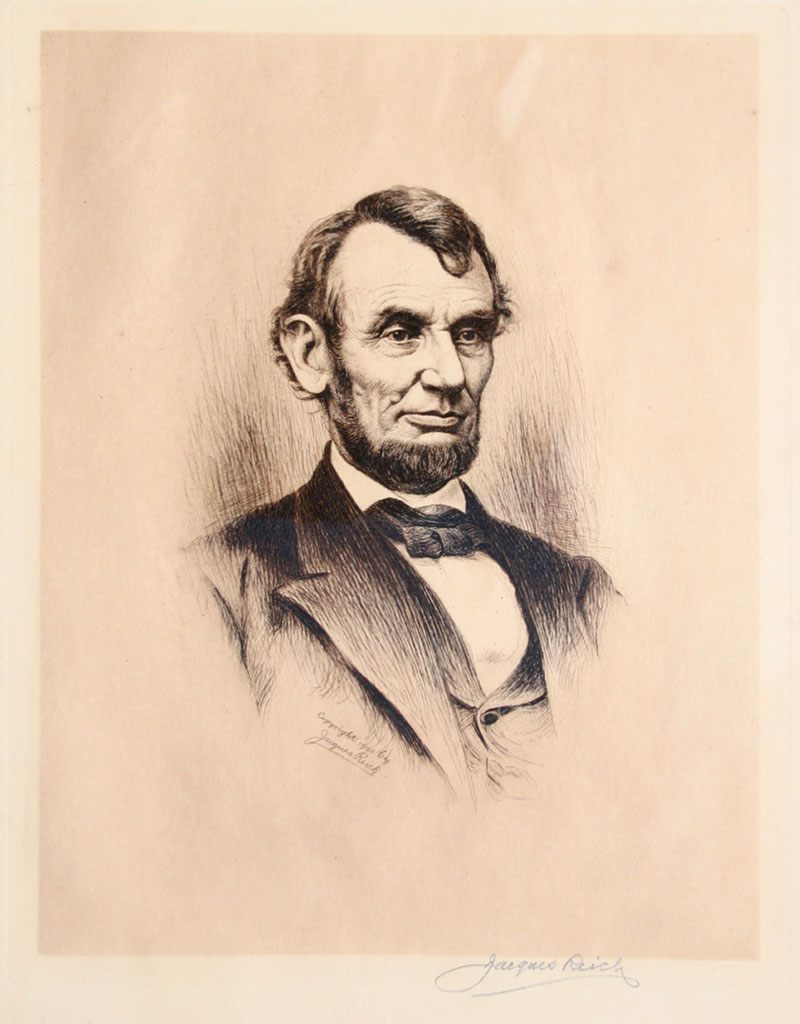

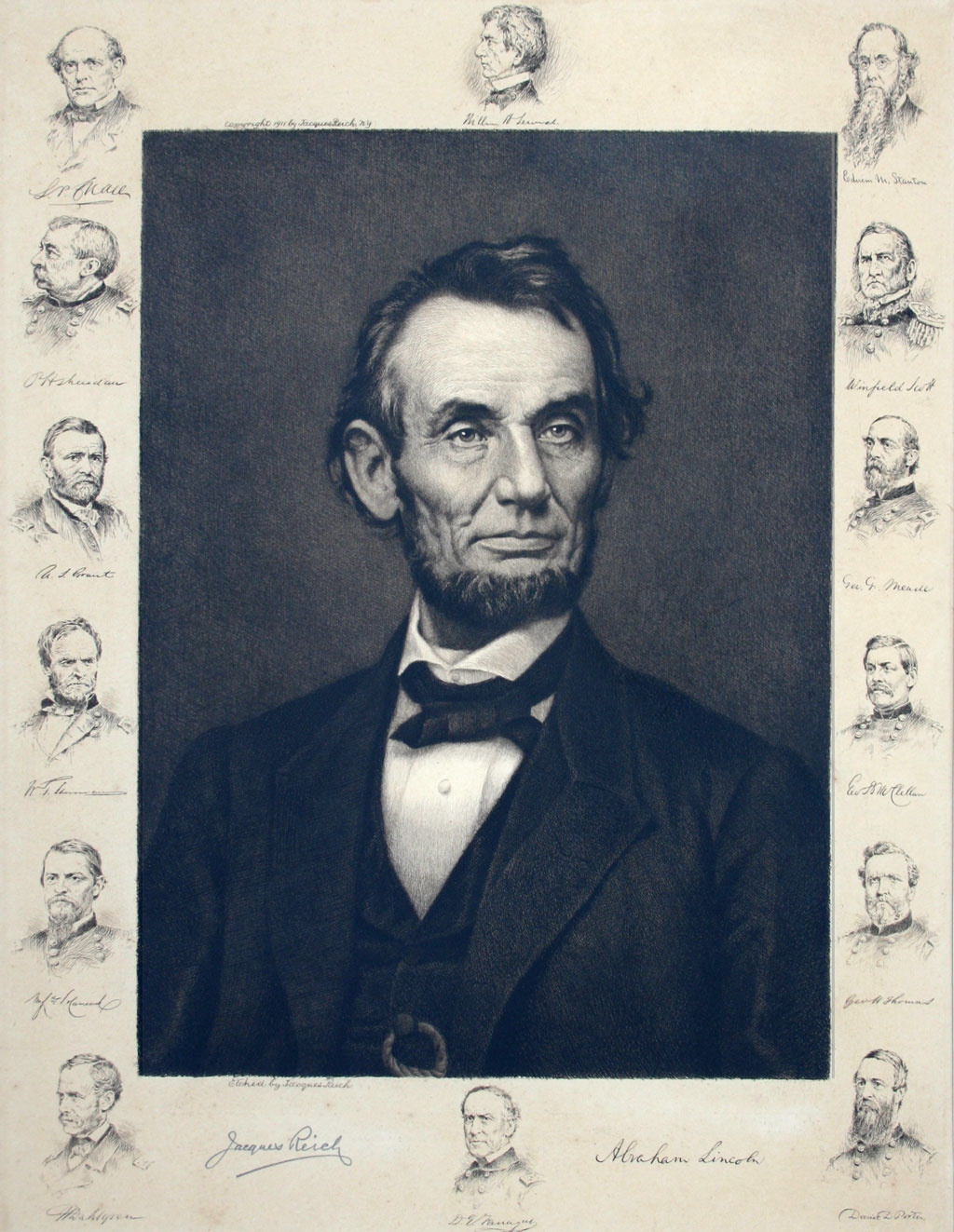
