= Geneva-on-the-Lake =

Geneva-on-the-Lake may refer to:

- Geneva-on-the-Lake, Ohio
- Nester House (Geneva, New York), also known as Geneva-on-the-Lake and listed on the NRHP in New York
