= Touchmenot Mountain =

Mountain in New York, United States

- Location within New York Location within the United States

Highest point
- Elevation: 2,762 feet (842 m)
- Coordinates: 42°02′53″N 74°44′27″W

Geography
- Location: Margaretville, New York, U.S.
- Topo map: USGS Arena

Touchmenot Mountain is a mountain located in the Catskill Mountains of New York southwest of Margaretville. Cross Mountain is located northeast of Touchmenot Mountain and Barkaboom Mountain is located northeast.
