= District 10 School =

Historic schoolhouse in New York State, USA

- U.S. National Register of Historic Places
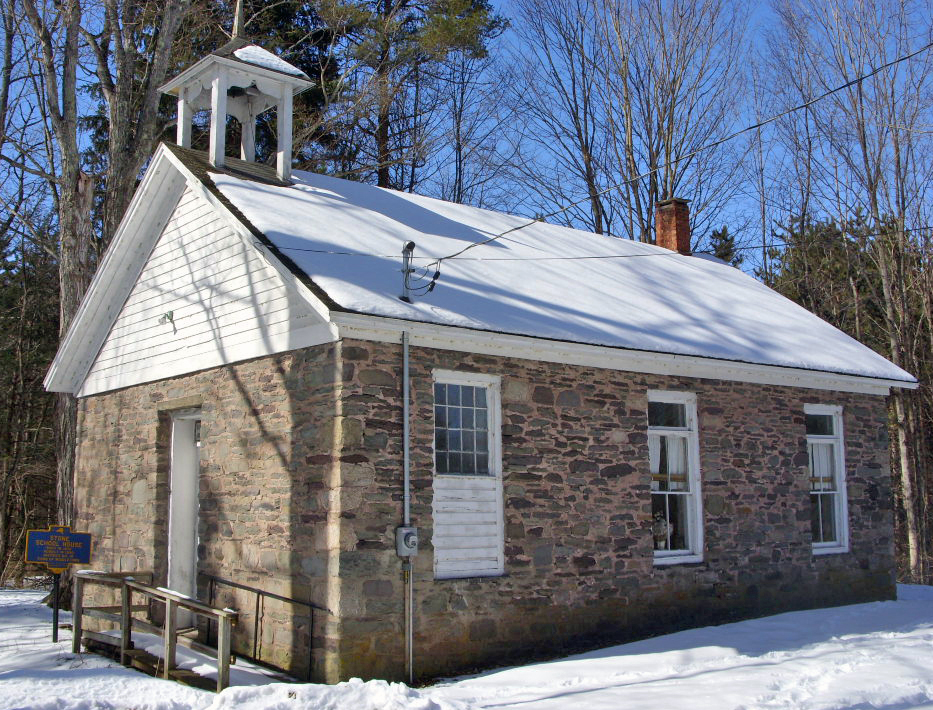
- East elevation and south profile, 2009
- Location: Dunraven, NY
- Nearest city: Oneonta
- Coordinates: 42°07′21″N 74°40′31″W
- Built: 1860
- NRHP reference No.: 98000131
- Added to NRHP: 1998

The former District 10 School is located just north of state highways 28 and 30 south of Margaretville, New York, United States. It is a stone one-room schoolhouse built, demolished and rebuilt in the middle of the 19th century.

It was the only structure left standing in the large area condemned by New York City when nearby Pepacton Reservoir was built. Today it serves as a local history museum. In 1998 it and its privy were listed on the National Register of Historic Places.

== Property ==
The school and privy are at the end of a small unpaved road leading north from the highway about 2 miles (3.2 km) south of Margaretville, just north of the reservoir. The area around the school is wooded and otherwise undeveloped. The East Branch of the Delaware River, the waterway impounded to create the reservoir, is a short distance to the northwest.

The main building is a small one-story structure, 36 by 26 feet (11.0 by 7.9 m), of fieldstone walls and foundation with a gabled roof covered in asphalt shingles, pierced by a small bell tower at the front and a brick chimney at the rear. Clapboard fills in the gable ends. A single paneled door is centrally located in the south (front) facade; there are three windows on either side and two on the rear. A stone step leads up to the front door, supplemented by a modern wooden wheelchair ramp. At the left, five feet (1.75 m) off the ground is a datestone with "1820" on it.

Inside a small vestibule opens into the main schoolroom, with wooden floors, walls in horizontal wood siding to four feet (1.3 m) and pressed tin above joining a similar ceiling. A box stove is at the rear, and blackboards and desks and other school items, some original, are located within.

The privy is northeast of the school. It is a small frame building, 6½ by 10½ feet (2 by 3.2 m) on a stone foundation, sided in clapboard with an asphalt roof. There are two rooms, one for boys and another for girls.

== History ==
Dunraven had its own school as early as 1765, when a wooden school was built somewhere in the vicinity. It burned sometime between its construction and 1820, when a local couple conveyed the small lot where the school stands now to the school district with the condition that it could only be used for educational or religious purposes by them or any subsequent owner. The townspeople built a school of fieldstone, an unusual material for a schoolhouse in upstate New York but probably understandable in Dunraven due to its local abundance. Its appearance is not known, although it may have been similar to the current building. The original privy, whose exact date of construction is not known, had no separate toilets.

By 1857 the school had fallen into disrepair, and was apparently torn down. The stones were saved to be rebuilt with new mortar in 1860. Eighty years later, in 1940, the small local districts were centralized, and the school became the property of the Margaretville Central School District.

After World War II, when New York City began the process of acquiring and condemning land for Pepacton Reservoir, it first attempted to overturn the deed restriction in order to demolish the school. It was unsuccessful, and after it abandoned the attempt the district tried to sell the building. Voters rejected the proposal, and the district then transferred the property to the Town of Middletown for use as a historical museum. It also serves some other public purposes.

== See also ==
- National Register of Historic Places listings in Delaware County, New York
