= Cross Mountain (Delaware County, New York) =

Mountain in New York, United States

- Location within New York Location within the United States

Highest point
- Elevation: 2,342 feet (714 m)
- Coordinates: 42°04′51″N 74°41′45″W

Geography
- Location: Margaretville, New York, U.S.
- Topo map: USGS Arena

Cross Mountain is a mountain located in the Catskill Mountains of New York southwest of Margaretville. Touchmenot Mountain is located southwest of Cross Mountain and Barkaboom Mountain is located southwest.
