= Barkaboom Mountain =

Mountain in New York, United States

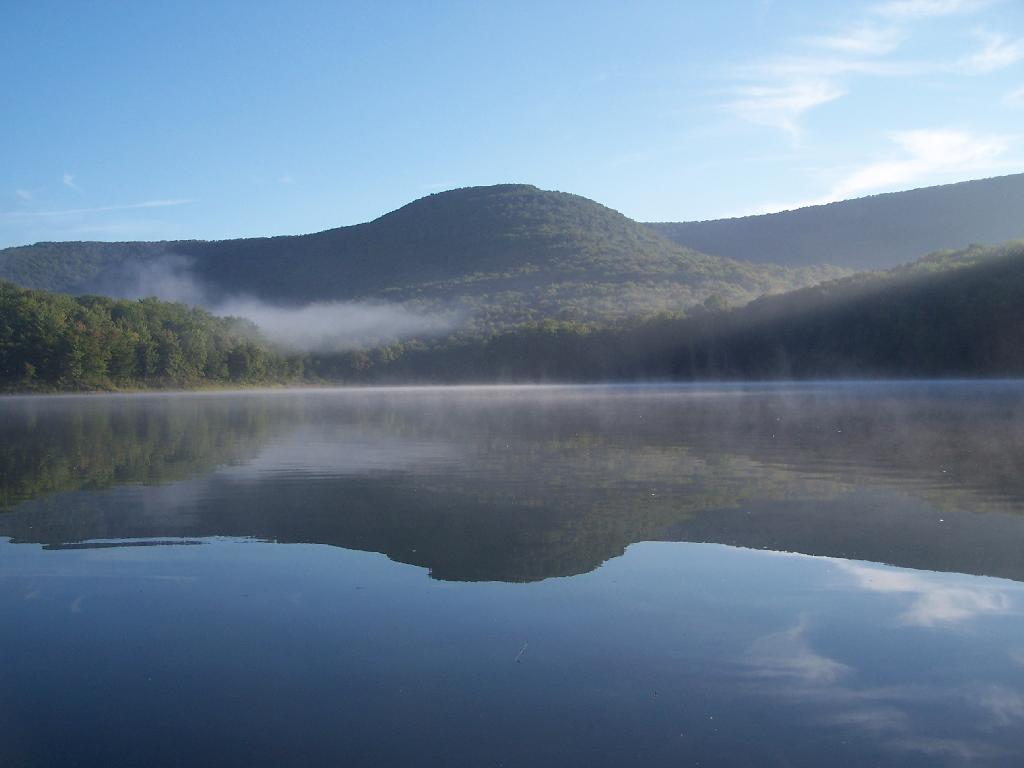
- Barkaboom Mountain from Big Pond

Highest point
- Elevation: 3,005 feet (916 m)
- Coordinates: 42°04′18″N 74°43′13″W

Geography
- Location within New York Location within the United States
- Location: Margaretville, New York, U.S.
- Topo map: USGS Arena

Barkaboom Mountain is a mountain located in the Catskill Mountains of New York southwest of Margaretville. Touchmenot Mountain is located southwest of Barkaboom Mountain and Cross Mountain is located northeast.
