= Galli-Curci Theatre =

- U.S. National Register of Historic Places
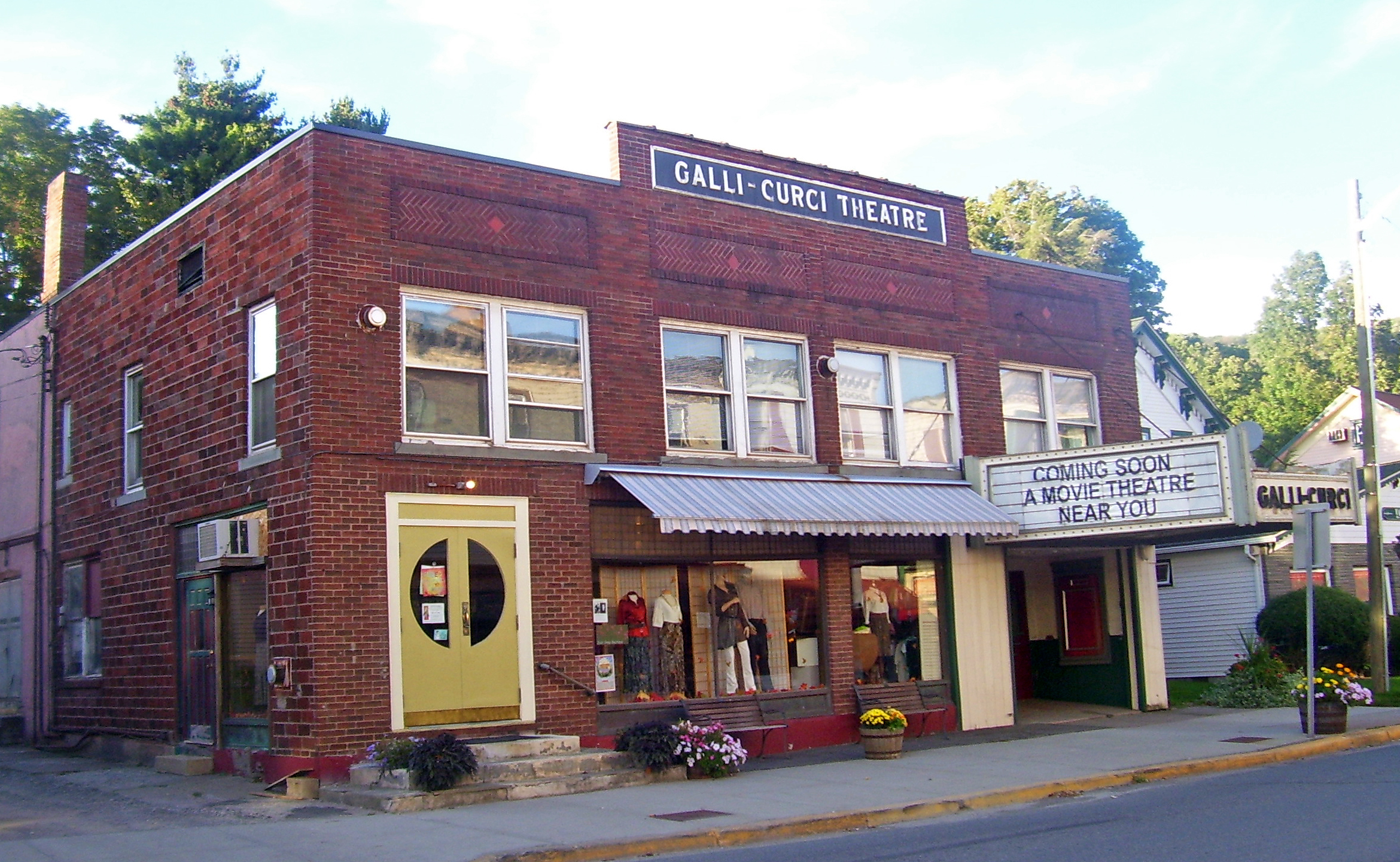
- Location: Margaretville, NY
- Nearest city: Oneonta
- Coordinates: 42°8′56″N 74°38′52″W
- Built: 1922
- NRHP reference No.: 06000254
- Added to NRHP: March 15, 2006

The Galli-Curci Theatre is located on Main Street (state highway NY 30) in Margaretville, New York, United States. It is a brick building erected in the 1920s, now primarily used as a store, although some of the original theater remains. It was named after opera singer Amelita Galli-Curci, who summered at her historic country estate near Margaretville from 1922 to 1937 and sang at its opening night.

It was built by local entrepreneur Clarke Sanford to house two pioneering businesses in the region, a car dealership and silent movie theater and offices of the Catskill Mountain News. Under later owners, it continued to show movies until 1985. It was modified afterwards for reuse as an antique store, but has remained mostly intact from its period of cinematic use. In 2006 it was listed on the National Register of Historic Places. It is currently a mixed-use jewelry store and office space.

== Building ==
The Galli-Curci Theatre sits on the west side of Main Street just north of its intersection with Bridge Street, which carries Route 30 into Margaretville across the East Branch of the Delaware River from the end of its overlap with NY 28 a short distance away. The neighborhood is heavily developed, with the intersection, the village's center, flanked by many three-story mixed-use buildings of a late-19th/early-20th century vintage. To the north the neighborhood becomes residential.

The building is in two sections, 50 feet (15 m) wide by 142 feet (43 m) deep. The shorter front section, with the retail space and theater entrance, is a two-story brick structure on a poured concrete foundation. Three of its four bays are taken up by a storefront with glass windows in the center and a double-doored entrance with half-moon glass panels at the south end; the northernmost is the theater entrance, sheltered by a trapezoidal tin-sheathed wooden marquee with the letters "Galli-Curci" on the front. On the second story are paired windows framed by brick lintels and bluestone sills topped by a rectangular decorative panel of brick and terra cotta. The center parapet on the flat roof has a large wooden "GALLI-CURCI THEATRE" sign.

The auditorium section at the rear is built of concrete block faced in stucco. Its roof slopes gently from front to back at the same grade as the floor inside. A brick chimney rises from the south section of the EPDM rubber roof. The tops of two wooden trusses, added later to shore up the building, are visible as well.

Inside the front block, the store space has its original flooring and pressed-metal ceiling. The upstairs apartment, once office space, has its own original flooring and moldings. Two double doors with half-moon glass panels, similar to those leading into the store, lead into the theater at the end of the recessed entryway under the marquee.

A narrow carpeted entryway slopes up to the auditorium. There, a wooden level floor, built for retail purposes after the theater was shut down, remains. Two of the original wooden standee walls set off the lobby in the rear, and show a color scheme dating from the 1940s. The ceiling is of plain plaster, with fluorescent fixtures replacing the original lighting.

== History ==
Successful upon its inception, the theatre suffered from changes in the national and local economies after World War II. It struggled to adapt, but stayed in business as a movie theater under different owners until the mid-1980s. In 1987, it was reused as a multi-dealer antiques center. While there were plans to convert it back into a theater in 2005, they never got off the ground. Since 2019, the theatre has been a mixed-use jewelry store and office space.

=== 1922–1942: Early success ===
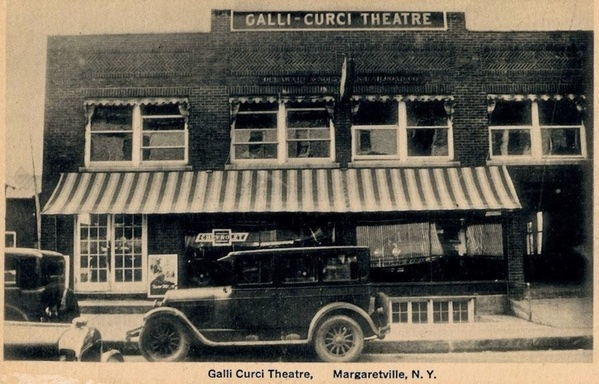
A vintage postcard depicting the theatre

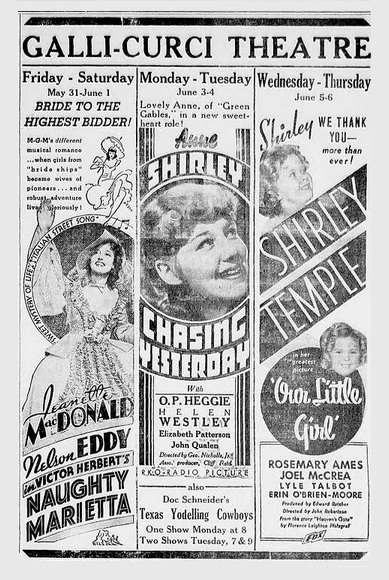
An advertisement for movies showing at the Galli-Curci Theatre in late May and early June 1935

Clarke A. Sanford, scion of the family that owned the local bank, had taught school and worked as a reporter for the Oneonta Star before returning to the area in 1904 to buy the local paper, recently renamed the Catskill Mountain News. In 1907, he was the first person in Margaretville to buy an automobile. Local lore has it that after having the Pope-Toledo shipped to Kingston and driving it overland to the village, he crashed it into one of the outbuildings on his family farm in nearby Dunraven. Seven years later, in 1914, he and a partner opened the first dealership in town, selling Buicks, Fords and Packards from the new building on Bridge Street Sanford had previously had built for the newspaper operations.

On the upper floor Sanford brought another 20th-century invention, the movies, to Margaretville. He began charging admission to silent films that year. His wife made the popcorn. It was successful enough, due to a boom in the local economy and a strong business in summertime from resort visitors, that it needed more space.

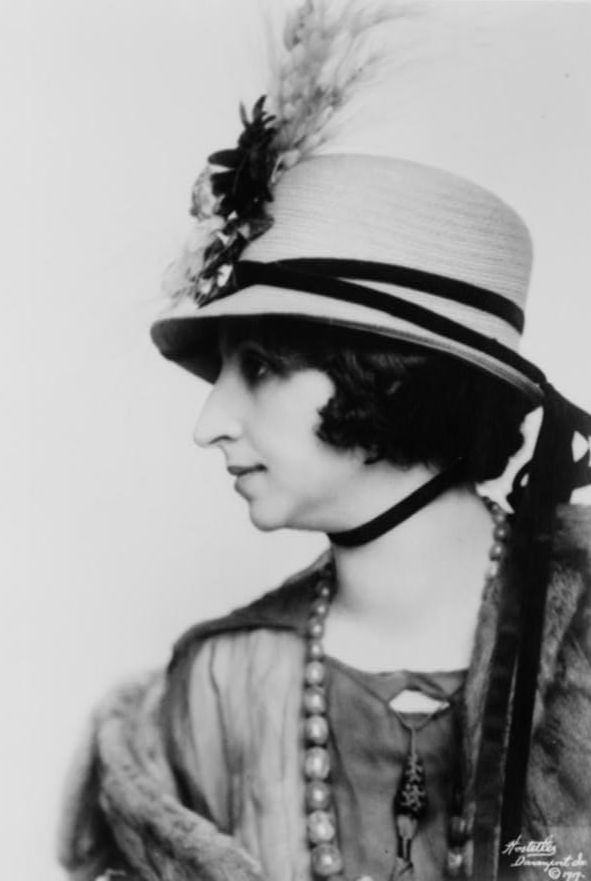
Amelita Galli-Curci

In 1922 he had the theater built, complete with a player piano. He put the dealership on the ground floor, the newspaper's editorial offices upstairs and its printing press downstairs. The remaining office space was rented to the Delaware and Northern Railroad. He offered to name the theater after Amelita Galli-Curci, whose Sul Monte estate was in nearby Highmount, if she sang at opening night in 1922, which she did, closing with "Home! Sweet Home!".

Sanford served in a number of local political offices, and was later named one of New York's first Commissioners of Motor Vehicles. In 1930 he added sound capability to the theatre, which continued to do enough business to sustain the car dealership through the Depression. The offerings included live entertainment as well, from touring companies doing condensed versions of Broadway plays, local theater groups, minstrel shows and school and community functions. His son joined him in the business, and by the end of the decade the family was operating another theater, the Maxbilt in nearby Fleischmanns.

=== 1942–1964: Setbacks ===
In 1942, the railroad went out of business and the newspaper took over its offices. Four years later, in 1946, the Sanfords leased the theater to the Kallet chain on the condition that they keep the revenue from the concession stand, and Kallet invest in improvements. Two years later, the chain began a substantial remodeling of the interior, filling in the orchestra pit to add more seats. The wood trusses that break the roof plane were added at this time.

The theater was unable to benefit in the long run because, with the end of World War II, New York City had resumed plans to expand its water supply system and complete Pepacton Reservoir to the south. In the short run, the large construction workforce buoyed the local economy, but, when the reservoir was finished, the effects of losing five nearby towns, including the Sanford farmstead in Dunraven, made itself felt. Television also began to cut into film revenues; in 1955, Kallet had the theater modified again to support the widescreen productions studios were turning out to compete with the small screen.

Three years later, in 1958, the Sanfords cancelled the lease and resumed direct control of the theater. The decline in revenue continued, and in 1963 Clarke Sanford made a successful claim of lost business to the temporary commission set up to compensate those displaced or otherwise affected by the reservoir's construction. He died the following year.

=== 1964–present: End of theatrical use ===
His son Roswell had taken over the newspaper and theater. He soon moved the former to another nearby office (later to Arkville, the next town east along Route 28), converted the second floor into an apartment and sold the theater to Donald Conine, who in turn sold it in 1975 to Ben Resnick. He continued exhibiting films until 1985, when the advent of home video magnified the effect television had had on the theater's business three decades before.

The auditorium was again adapted for live music performances, and another new owner, the Goths, changed directions entirely when they bought the building in 1987. They put in the wooden floor and began selling antiques, taking out the projection and sound equipment in the process. Later, it became vacant again. In 2005, it was acquired by two new owners who planned to convert it into several movie screens, but were unsuccessful.

In 2018, the building was purchased by Icelandic designer Jóhanna Methúsalemsdóttir. Since 2019, she and her partner Paul Weil have operated Kria Jewelry in the former theatre.

== See also ==
- National Register of Historic Places listings in Delaware County, New York
