= Canada Falls =

- Location within New York
- Location: Delaware County, New York
- Coordinates: 42°09′00″N 74°42′01″W
- Elevation: 1,430 ft (440 m)

Canada Falls is a waterfall in Delaware County, New York. It is located west of Margaretville along NY–28, on an unnamed creek that flows through Canada Hollow.

== See also ==
- List of waterfalls
