= Philip D. Armour III House =

Historic house in Illinois, United States

- U.S. National Register of Historic Places
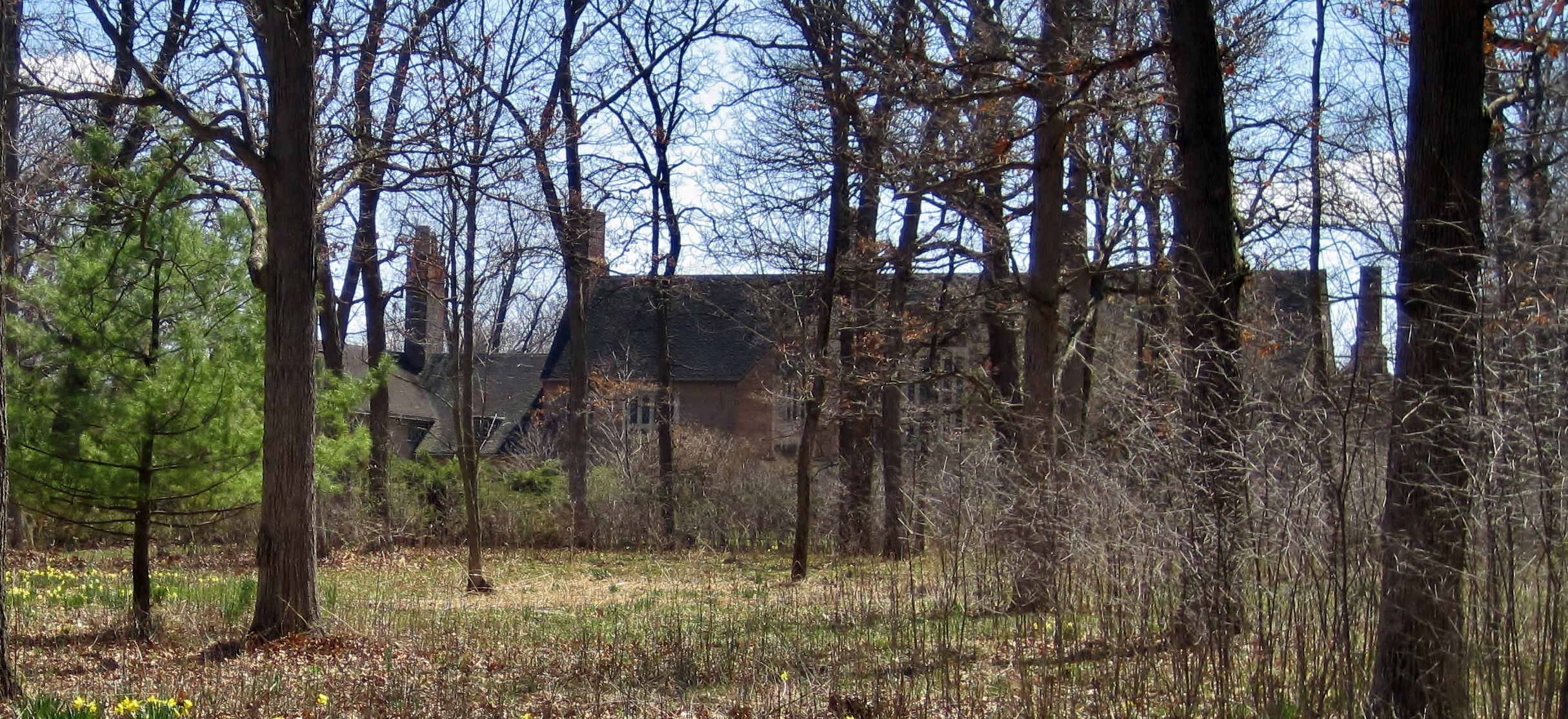
- The Philip D. Armour III House in 2014

- Location within Illinois Location within the United States
- Location: 900 Armour Drive, Lake Bluff, Illinois
- Coordinates: 39°35′6″N 87°49′7″W
- Area: 6.2 acres (2.5 ha)
- Built: 1932
- Architect: Harrie T. Lindeberg
- Architectural style: Tudor Revival
- NRHP reference No.: 96001342
- Added to NRHP: November 15, 1996

The Philip D. Armour III House is a historic mansion in Lake Bluff, Illinois, USA. It was built for Philip D. Armour III, grandson of Armour and Company founder Philip D. Armour. It was designed in the Tudor Revival style by architect Harrie T. Lindeberg. It was listed on the National Register of Historic Places in 1996.

It remains privately owned as of 2025.
