= Hubbell Family Farm and Kelly's Corners Cemetery =

Historic cemetery in New York, United States

- U.S. National Register of Historic Places
- U.S. Historic district
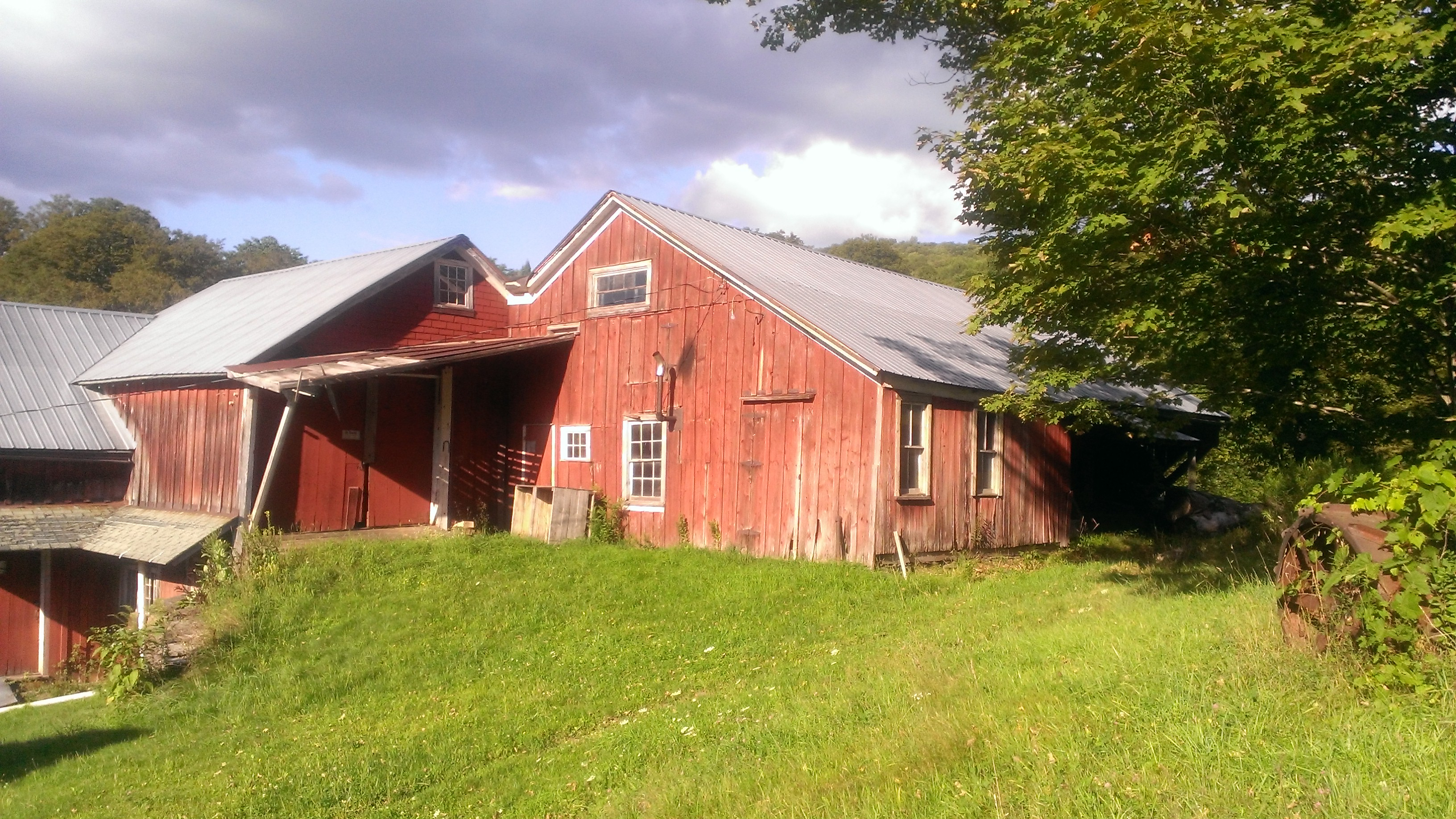

- Location within New York Location within the United States
- Location: NY 30, Kelly's Corners, New York
- Coordinates: 42°11′25″N 74°35′40″W
- Area: 276 acres (112 ha)
- Architect: multiple
- NRHP reference No.: 01000892
- Added to NRHP: August 17, 2001

Hubbell Family Farm and Kelly's Corners Cemetery is a historic farm complex, cemetery, and national historic district located at Kelly's Corners, Delaware County, New York. The district contains 19 contributing buildings, two contributing sites, and four contributing structures.

It includes the Hubbell family farmhouses (1925 and 1894–1895), poultry house (1890s), chicken house (1920s), woodworking shop (1930s), Keene residence, blacksmith shop (1880s), playhouse (mid-1930s), garage (1900), wagon house, "Cornell approved" business outhouse (c. 1910), privy (ca. 1850s), laundry / wood house (ca. 1900), carriage house (ca. 1860–1870), Milow Hubbell residence (pre 1848), office / machine shop / hardware store (1884–2001), lumber and cement storage and scales (pre-1900), dairy barn (1858) with silo and milk house, root cellar and tool shed, saw mill / cider mill (1850s–1860s), former ice house (now sap house), and powder magazine. The cemetery includes about 150 burials that date back to 1875.

It was listed on the National Register of Historic Places in 2001.

== See also ==
- National Register of Historic Places listings in Delaware County, New York
