= New Kingston Historic District =

Historic district in New York, United States

- U.S. National Register of Historic Places
- U.S. Historic district
- Location within New York Location within the United States
- Location: Co. Rd. 6, New Kingston, New York
- Coordinates: 42°12′52.4″N 74°40′53.16″W
- Area: 11.1 acres (4.5 ha)
- Architect: Scott family; et al.
- Architectural style: Mid 19th Century Revival, Late Victorian
- NRHP reference No.: 08000037
- Added to NRHP: February 19, 2008

New Kingston Historic District is a national historic district located at New Kingston in Delaware County, New York. The district contains 44 contributing buildings and four contributing structures. It encompasses nearly all of the small, unincorporated hamlet of New Kingston.

It was listed on the National Register of Historic Places in 2008.

== See also ==
- National Register of Historic Places listings in Delaware County, New York
