= Amelita Galli-Curci =

Italian coloratura soprano (1882–1963)

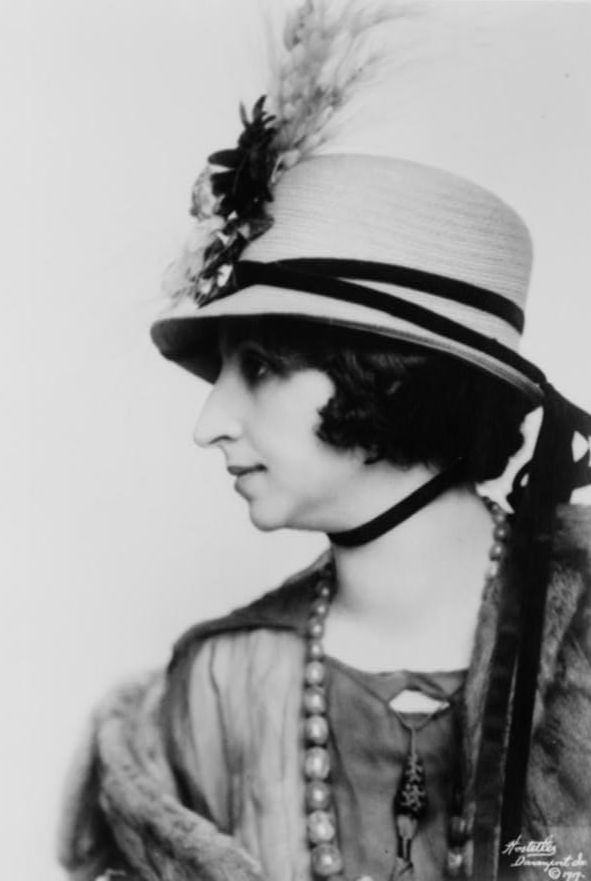
- Born: Amelita Galli; 18 November 1882; Milan, Kingdom of Italy
- Died: 26 November 1963 (aged 81); La Jolla, California, U.S.
- Education: Milan Conservatory
- Occupation: Opera singer
- Known for: Lyric coloratura soprano
- Spouses: Luigi Curci; Homer Samuels

Amelita Galli-Curci (18 November 1882 – 26 November 1963) was an Italian lyric coloratura soprano. She was one of the most famous operatic singers of the 20th century and a popular recording artist, with her records selling in large numbers.

== Early life ==
She was born Amelita Galli into an upper-middle-class Italian family of Spanish heritage in Milan. She studied piano at the Milan Conservatory, winning a gold medal for piano performance, and at the age of 16 was offered a professorship. She was inspired to sing by her grandmother. Operatic composer Pietro Mascagni also encouraged Galli-Curci's singing ambitions. By her own choice, Galli-Curci's voice was largely self-trained at the beginning of her career. She honed her technique by listening to other sopranos, reading old singing-method books, and doing piano exercises with her voice instead of using a keyboard. During the 1920s and 1930s, she was coached by Estelle Liebling in New York City.

== Career ==
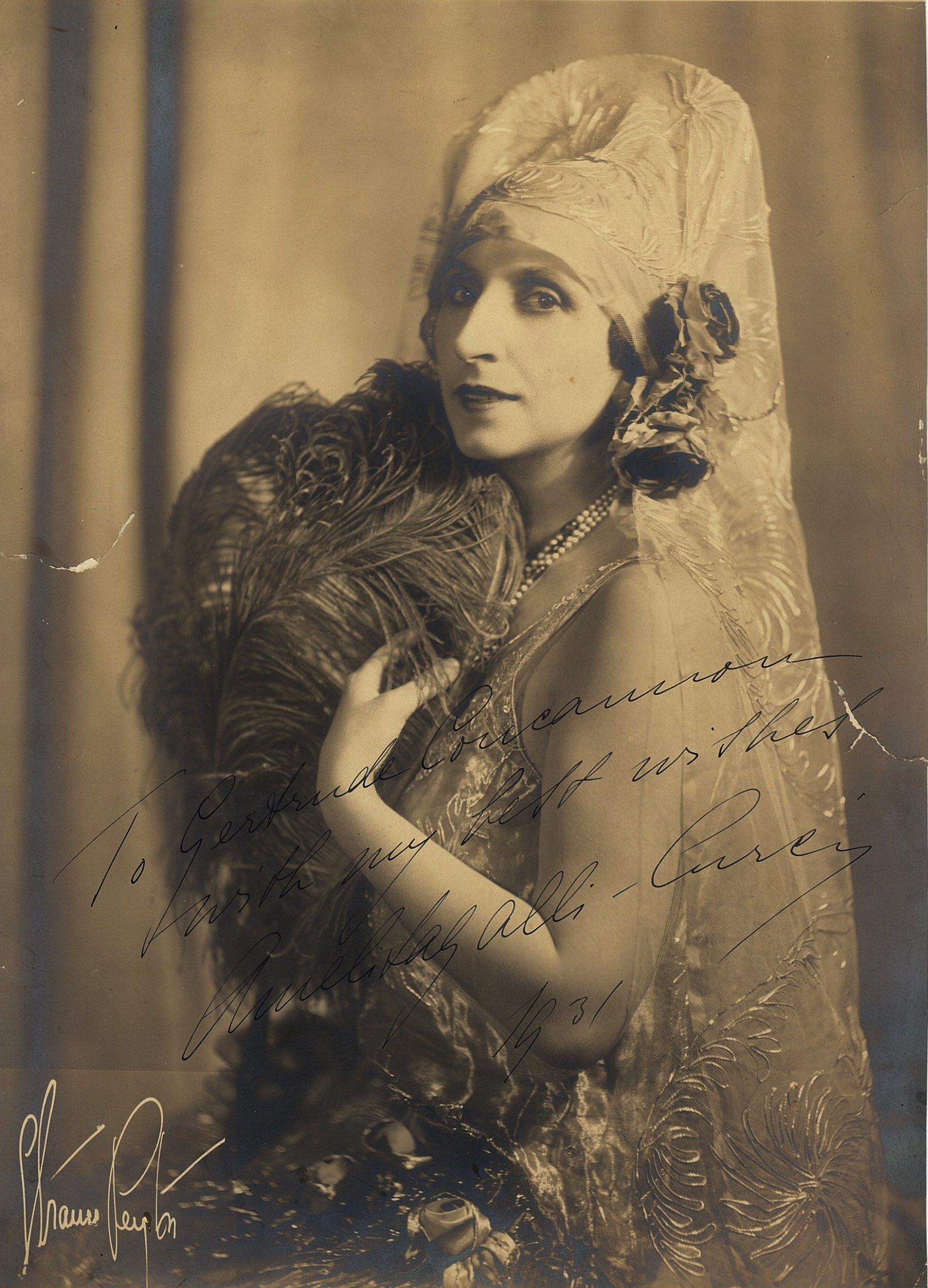
Signed portrait of Galli-Curci, 1931

Galli-Curci made her operatic debut in 1906 at Trani as Gilda in Giuseppe Verdi's Rigoletto. In 1908, she made her first appearance in Rome as Bettina in Bizet's Don Procopio, and she soon became acclaimed throughout Italy for the sweetness and agility of her voice and her captivating musical interpretations. She was seen by many critics as an antidote to the host of squally, verismo-oriented sopranos then populating Italian opera houses.

Galli-Curci toured widely in Europe, Russia and South America. In 1915, she sang two performances of Lucia di Lammermoor with Enrico Caruso in Buenos Aires. These were to be her only operatic appearances with the great tenor, though they later appeared in concert and made a few recordings together. Galli-Curci and Caruso also acted as godparents for the son of the Sicilian tenor Giulio Crimi.

Galli-Curci toured extensively as a concert artist throughout her career, including a 1924 tour of Great Britain (she never sang in an opera there), where she appeared in 20 cities, and a concert tour of Australia in 1925.

=== United States ===
In the autumn of 1916, Galli-Curci first arrived in the United States virtually unknown. Her stay in the US was intended to be brief, but the acclaim she received for her historic American debut as Gilda in Rigoletto in Chicago on 18 November 1916 (her 34th birthday) was so wildly enthusiastic that she accepted an offer to extend her association with the Chicago Opera Association, where she appeared until the end of the 1924 season. Also in 1916, Galli-Curci signed a recording contract with the Victor Talking Machine Company and made her first records a few weeks before her American debut. She recorded exclusively for Victor until 1930.

On 14 November 1921, while still under contract with the Chicago Opera, Galli-Curci made her debut at the Metropolitan Opera in New York as Violetta in La traviata, opposite tenor Beniamino Gigli as Alfredo. She was one of the few singers of that era who were contracted to both opera companies simultaneously. Galli-Curci remained at the Met until her retirement from the operatic stage nine years later.

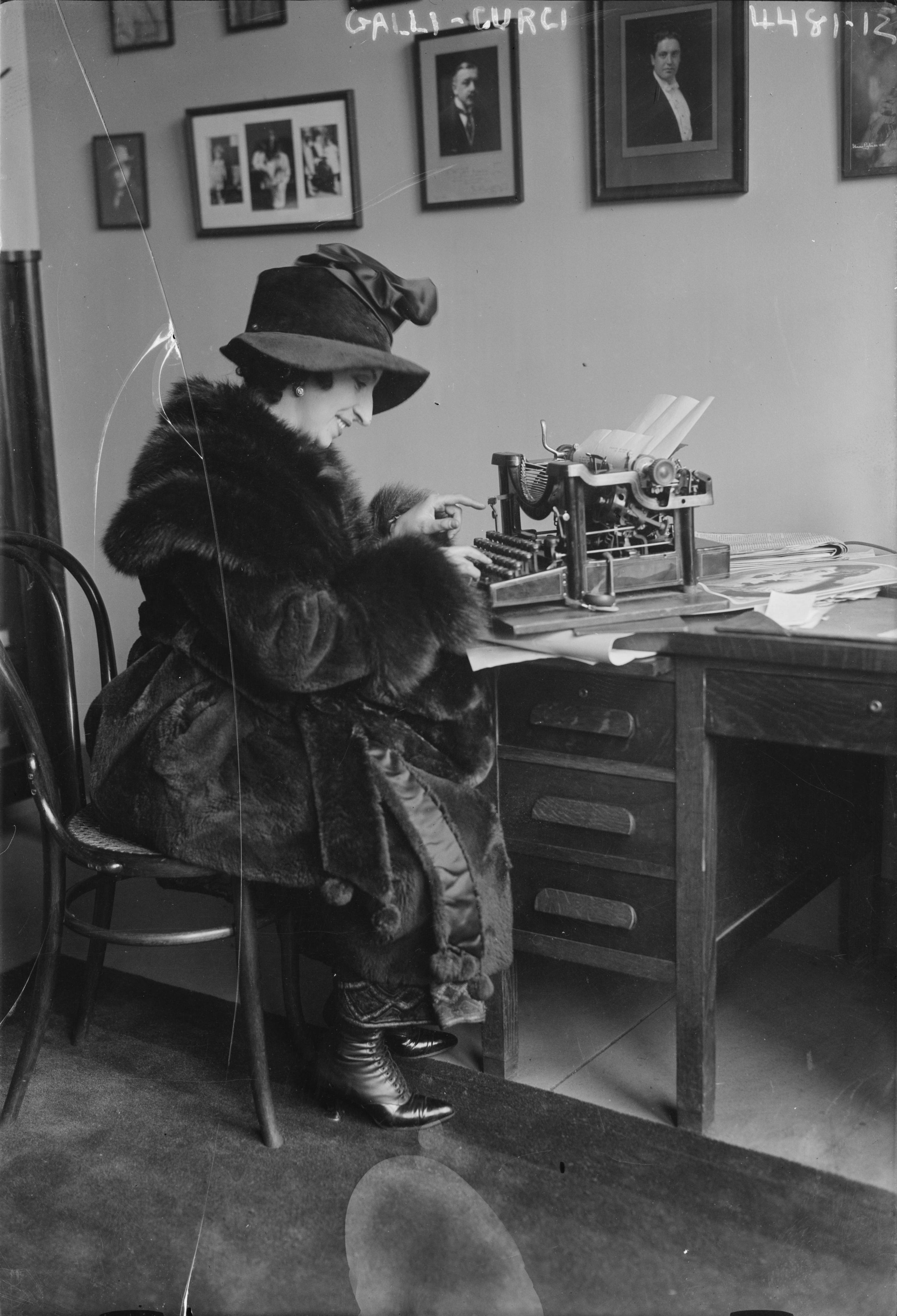
Galli-Curci typing in a fur coat, circa 1920

In 1922, Galli-Curci built a country estate in Highmount, New York, which she called "Sul Monte". She spent the summers there for several years until selling the property in 1937. A theater erected in the nearby village of Margaretville was named in her honor. She returned the favour by performing on its opening night. Sul Monte was listed on the National Register of Historic Places in 2010.

== Vocal decline and retirement from opera ==
Weary of opera house politics and convinced that opera was a dying art form, Galli-Curci retired from the operatic stage in January 1930 to concentrate instead on concert performances. Throat problems and the uncertain pitching of top notes had plagued her for several years, and she underwent surgery in 1935 for the removal of a thyroid goitre. Great care was taken during her surgery, which was performed under local anaesthesia; however, it was thought her voice suffered following the surgery, specifically, a nerve to her larynx, the external branch of the superior laryngeal nerve, was thought to have been damaged, resulting in the loss of her ability to sing high pitches. This nerve has since become known as the "nerve of Galli-Curci."

In 2001, researchers Crookes and Recaberen "examined contemporary press reviews after surgery, conducted interviews with colleagues and relatives of the surgeon, and compared the career of Galli-Curci with that of other singers" and determined that her vocal decline was most likely not caused by a surgical injury.

Other researchers (Marchese-Ragona et al.) have argued that tracheal compression caused by a goitre put an early end to Galli-Curci's career as a coloratura soprano, but it was nerve damage caused during surgery that prevented her from prolonging her career as a lyric or dramatic soprano.

== Personal life ==
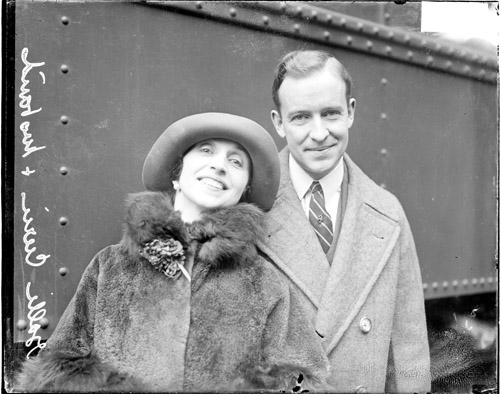
Galli-Curci with Homer Samuels

In 1908, Amelita Galli wed an Italian nobleman and painter, the Marchese Luigi Curci, attaching his surname to hers; the marriage was reportedly an unhappy one and they divorced in January 1920. The Marchese Curci petitioned the papal council in Rome for an annulment of the marriage in 1922. In 1921, Galli-Curci married Homer Samuels, her accompanist. Their marriage lasted until Samuel's death in 1956.

Galli-Curci was a follower of the Indian meditation and yoga teacher Paramahansa Yogananda. She wrote the foreword to Yogananda's 1929 book Whispers from Eternity.

== Return to opera, death and legacy ==
On 24 November 1936, Galli-Curci, aged 54, made an ill-advised return to opera, appearing in a single performance as Mimi in La bohème in Chicago. It was painfully clear that her best singing days were behind her and after another year of recitals she went into complete retirement, living in California where she spent much of her time painting. She taught singing privately until shortly before her death from emphysema in La Jolla, California, on 26 November 1963, at the age of 81. Among her students was soprano Jean Fenn.

Galli-Curci's voice can be heard today on original 78-rpm records and their LP and CD reissues. Based on her recorded legacy and contemporary assessments of Galli-Curci's performances in England and America, the opera commentator Michael Scott, writing in volume 2 of The Record of Singing (Duckworth, London, 1979), criticizes her technique but gives praise for her spontaneity and perfectionism.

Galli-Curci is honoured on the Hollywood Walk of Fame for recording, with a star located at 6121 Hollywood Boulevard.

In Studio Ghibli's film Grave of the Fireflies, her recording of "Home! Sweet Home!" is played at the end.

In the film Wake in Fright (1971), Galli-Curci's recording of "Caro nome" from Rigoletto can be heard playing as 'Doc' Tydon, portrayed by Donald Pleasence, remarks "What a doll... Galli-Curci".

== Select LP and CD collections ==
"Comme autrefois dans la nuit sombre" (Cavatine de Leila)
From Les pêcheurs de perles, Galli-Curci in 1921 with orchestra conducted by Josef Pasternack

LP:

- The Art of Galli-Curci RCA Camden CAL-410
- The Art of Galli-Curci Vol. 2 Bellini/Donizetti RCA Camden CAL-525
- Galli-Curci: Golden Age Coloratura RCA Victrola VIC-1518
- Golden Age Rigoletto RCA Victrola VIC-1633

CD:

- Amelita Galli-Curci RCA Victor Vocal Series 61413-2-RG
- Amelita Galli-Curci The Complete Acoustic Recordings Volume 1 Romophone 81003-2
- Amelita Galli-Curci The Complete Acoustic Recordings Volume 2 Romophone 81004-2
- Amelita Galli-Curci The Victor Recordings (1925–28) Romophone 81020-2
- Amelita Galli-Curci The Victor Recordings (1930) Romophone 81021-2

== Sources ==
- Galli-Curci's Life of Song, by C. E. Le Massena, The Paebar Co., New York 1945. ISBN 9780917734007
- The Last Prima Donnas, by Lanfranco Rasponi, Alfred A Knopf, 1982. ISBN 0-394-52153-6
