= Middletown, Delaware County, New York =

Middletown, New York
- Town
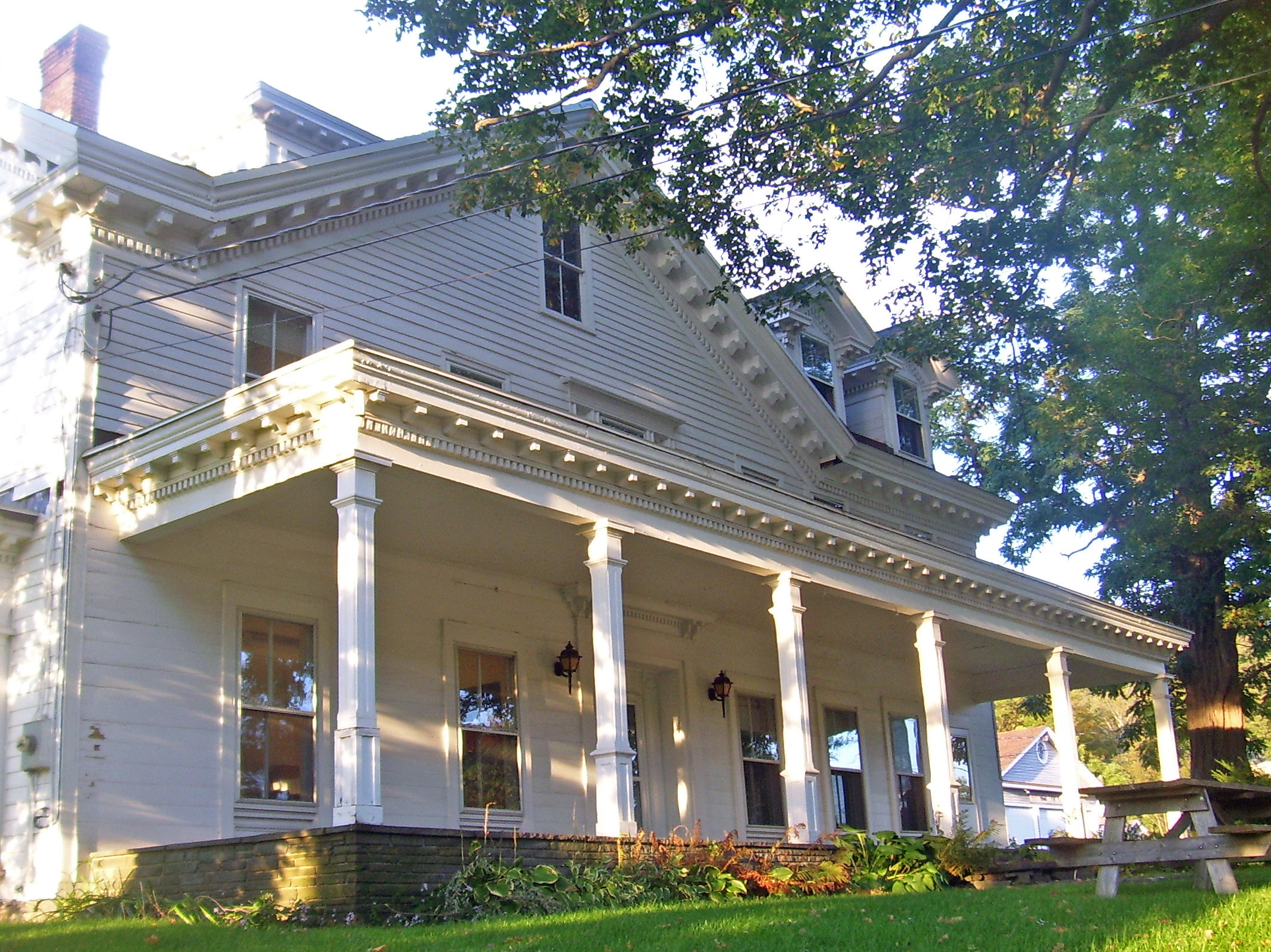
- The Erpf House in Arkville

- Location within the state of New York
- Coordinates: 42°10′9″N 74°36′38″W
- Country: United States
- State: New York
- County: Delaware

Government
  - Type: Town council
  - Town supervisor: Marjorie Miller (D)
  - Town council: Members' list: • John J. Roucek (R); • Brian F. Sweeney (D); • Michael Finberg (D); • John Bernhardt (D)

Area
  - Total: 97.3 sq mi (252.0 km^{2})
  - Land: 96.7 sq mi (250.4 km^{2})
  - Water: 0.62 sq mi (1.6 km^{2})
- Elevation: 1,350 ft (410 m)

Population (2020)
  - Total: 3,336
  - Density: 34.51/sq mi (13.32/km^{2})
- Time zone: UTC-5 (Eastern (EST))
  - Summer (DST): UTC-4 (EDT)
- ZIP codes: 12406 (Arkville); 12421 (Denver); 12430 (Fleischmanns); 12438 (Halcottsville); 12441 (Highmount); 12455 (Margaretville); 12459 (New Kingston); 12465 (Pine Hill)
- Area code: 845
- FIPS code: 36-47031
- GNIS feature ID: 0979216
- Website: www.townofmiddletowndelcony.gov

Middletown is a town in Delaware County, New York, United States. The population was 3,336 at the 2020 census. The town is in the southeastern part of the county.

== History ==
The town was formed from parts of the towns of Rochester and Woodstock in 1789 before the formation of Delaware County. The area of the original town has been reduced by the formation of new towns.

== Geography ==
The southeastern town line is the border of Ulster County, and the northeastern town line is the border of Greene County. The eastern part of the town is in the Catskill Park.

According to the United States Census Bureau, the town has a total area of 97.3 square miles (252.0 km^{2}), of which 96.7 square miles (250.4 km^{2}) is land and 0.62 square miles (1.6 km^{2}), or 0.64%, is water. The East Branch Delaware River flows from northeast to southwest across the town.

== Climate ==
The summer climate features warm to hot and often humid weather. High temperatures vary from 80–85 °F (27–29 °C) in the summer. Nighttime temperatures are warm and muggy; expect temperatures from 61–67 °F (16–19 °C). Winter conditions feature cold temperatures, but not harsh and great skiing conditions, unlike parts of the Adirondacks, with highs between 30–35 °F (−1–2 °C). Nighttime is cold, but not too harsh, between 18–23 °F (−8 – −5 °C).

== Demographics ==
Historical population
Census	Pop.	Note	%±
1820	1,949		—
1830	2,383		22.3%
1840	2,608		9.4%
1850	3,005		15.2%
1860	3,201		6.5%
1870	3,035		−5.2%
1880	2,977		−1.9%
1890	3,313		11.3%
1900	3,619		9.2%
1910	3,802		5.1%
1920	3,522		−7.4%
1930	3,532		0.3%
1940	3,420		−3.2%
1950	3,737		9.3%
1960	3,310		−11.4%
1970	3,466		4.7%
1980	3,555		2.6%
1990	3,406		−4.2%
2000	4,051		18.9%
2010	3,750		−7.4%
2020	3,336		−11.0%
U.S. Decennial Census 2020

As of the census of 2000, there were 4,051 people, 1,672 households, and 1,034 families residing in the town. The population density was 42.0 inhabitants per square mile (16.2/km^{2}). There were 3,013 housing units at an average density of 31.3 per square mile (12.1/km^{2}). The racial makeup of the town was 95.11% white, .64% African American, .32% Native American, .72% Asian, 2.12% from other races, and 1.09% from two or more races. Hispanic or Latino of any race were 6.42% of the population.

There were 1,672 households, out of which 23.9% had children under the age of 18 living with them, 49.6% were married couples living together, 8.4% had a female householder with no husband present, and 38.1% were non-families. 31.6% of all households were made up of individuals, and 14.4% had someone living alone who was 65 years of age or older. The average household size was 2.29 and the average family size was 2.86.

In the town, the population was spread out, with 21.0% under the age of 18, 4.8% from 18 to 24, 22.7% from 25 to 44, 27.5% from 45 to 64, and 24.0% who were 65 years of age or older. The median age was 46 years. For every 100 females, there were 93.7 males. For every 100 females age 18 and over, there were 92.3 males.

The median income for a household in the town was $31,346, and the median income for a family was $36,818. Males had a median income of $26,418 versus $24,250 for females. The per capita income for the town was $17,635. About 12.6% of families and 16.8% of the population were below the poverty line, including 28.3% of those under age 18 and 9.6% of those age 65 or over.

== Communities and locations in Middletown ==
- Arena – hamlet
- Arkville – The Pakatakan Artists Colony Historic District was listed on the National Register of Historic Places in 1989.
- Bedell – hamlet
- Denver – hamlet
- Dunraven – location west of Margaretville
- Fleischmanns – village
- Grant Mills
- Halcottsville – hamlet
- Hanley Corner
- Kelly's Corners – The Hubbell Family Farm and Kelly's Corners Cemetery was listed on the National Register of Historic Places in 2001.
- Margaretville – village
- New Kingston – The New Kingston Historic District, New Kingston Presbyterian Church, and Thomson Family Farm are listed on the National Register of Historic Places.
