= Van Benschoten House and Guest House =

Historic house in New York, United States

- U.S. National Register of Historic Places
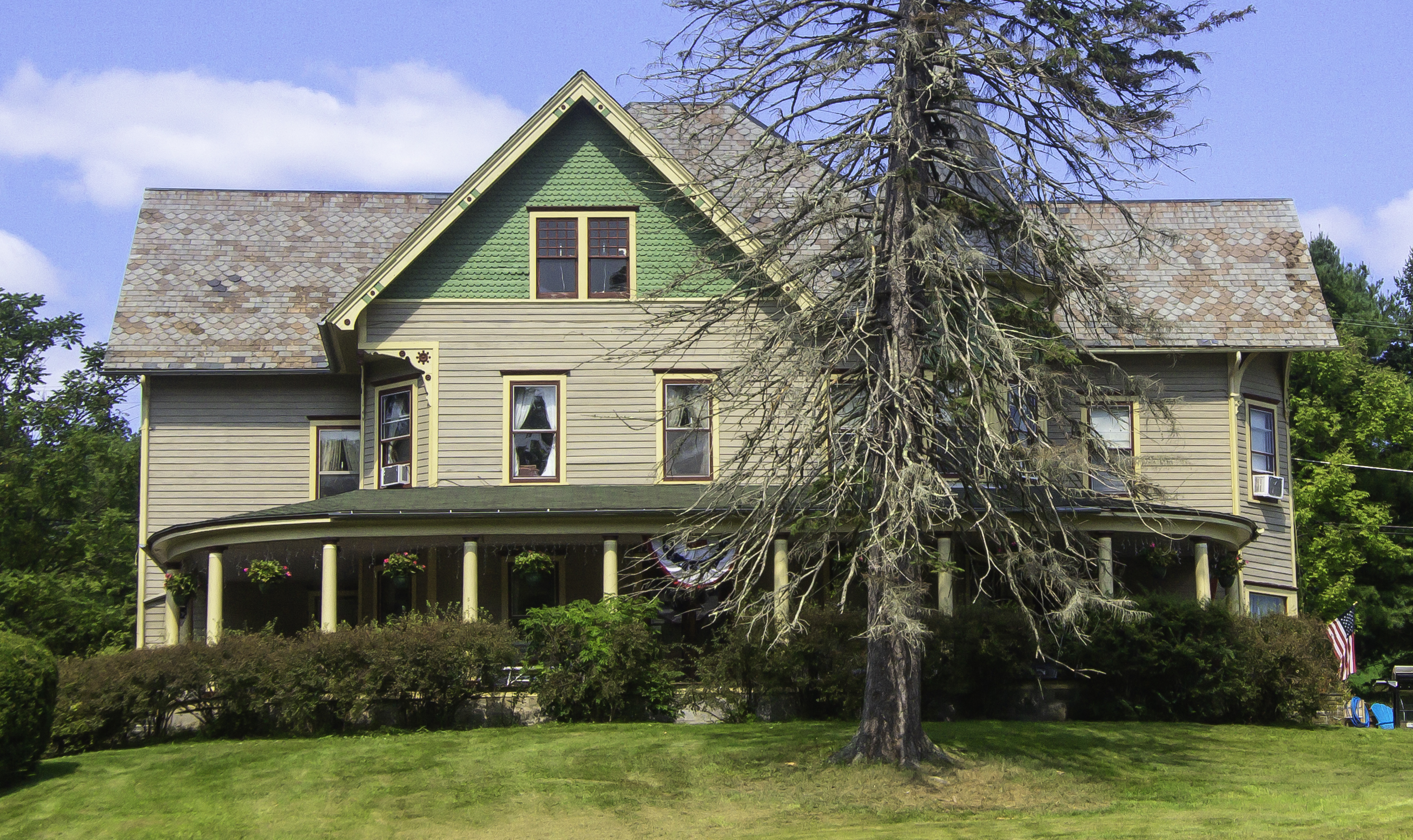
- The main house in 2025

- Location within New York Location within the United States
- Nearest city: Margaretville, New York
- Coordinates: 42°10′2″N 74°40′8″W
- Area: 5.7 acres (2.3 ha)
- Built: 1867
- Architectural style: Queen Anne
- NRHP reference No.: 02000302
- Added to NRHP: April 1, 2002

The Margaretville Mountain Inn, formerly Van Benschoten House and Guest House, is a historic farmhouse complex located near Margaretville in Delaware County, New York, New York, United States. The property includes a Queen Anne–style main residence, a guest house, and associated agricultural buildings. It is an example of late nineteenth-century summer boarding house design applied to a working farmhouse in the Catskill Mountains region.

The property reflects the historical practice of farm families in the Catskills supplementing agricultural income by accommodating seasonal visitors during the late nineteenth and early twentieth centuries.

It was listed on the National Register of Historic Places in 2002. The property is presently operated as a bed and breakfast and wedding venue.

== History ==
The Van Benschoten property originated as a working farm in the mid-nineteenth century. Construction on the site dates to about 1867, with the main house substantially expanded and remodeled around 1890.

During this period the Catskill Mountains region developed as a popular summer destination for visitors from urban areas seeking cooler temperatures and rural scenery. Many farms adapted their homes to provide lodging for guests, creating small-scale boarding houses that supplemented farm income.

== Architecture ==
The main house was built about 1890 and exhibits characteristics of the Queen Anne style. The two-story wood-frame residence has an irregular massing created by four gabled pavilions projecting from a central hipped-roof core.

A prominent octagonal tower rises from one corner of the structure and is topped by a tall pointed roof. These features are typical of the asymmetrical and picturesque forms associated with late nineteenth-century Queen Anne domestic architecture.

Also located on the property is a cow barn, reflecting the site's continued use as a working farm.

== See also ==
- National Register of Historic Places listings in Delaware County, New York
