= Harrie T. Lindeberg =

American architect (1879 - 1959)

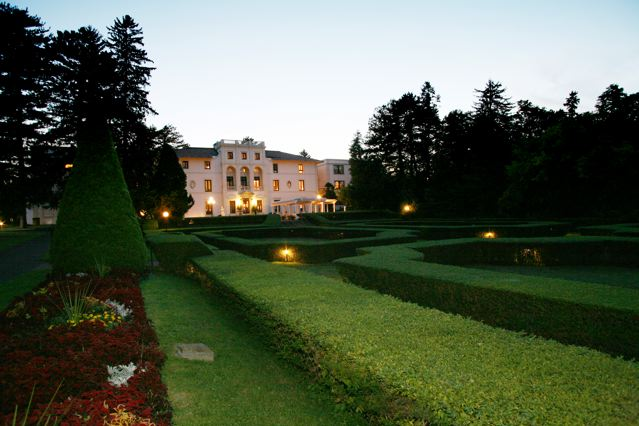
- Nester House, Geneva, New York, 1911
- Born: Harrie Thomas Lindeberg; 1879; Bergen Point, New Jersey
- Died: January 10, 1959 (aged 79–80); Locust Valley, New York
- Occupation: Architect
- Spouses: Lucia Hull (div. 1925) Angeline Krech James (m. 1937)
- Practice: New York City
- Buildings: country houses
- Projects: Amelita Galli-Curci Estate

Harrie Thomas Lindeberg (1879 – January 10, 1959) was an American architect, best known for designing country houses in the United States. Among academic eclectic architects Lindeberg found a niche as "the American Lutyens" by working in a variety of popular styles while imparting a crisp modern stamp to his work. He might best be compared to contemporary Art Deco and Streamline Moderne skyscraper architects such as Raymond Hood, Ely Jacques Kahn, and Ralph Thomas Walker.

== Early life ==
Harrie Thomas Lindeberg was born in Bergen Point, New Jersey in 1879.

He studied architecture at the National Academy of Design from 1898 to 1901.

== Career ==
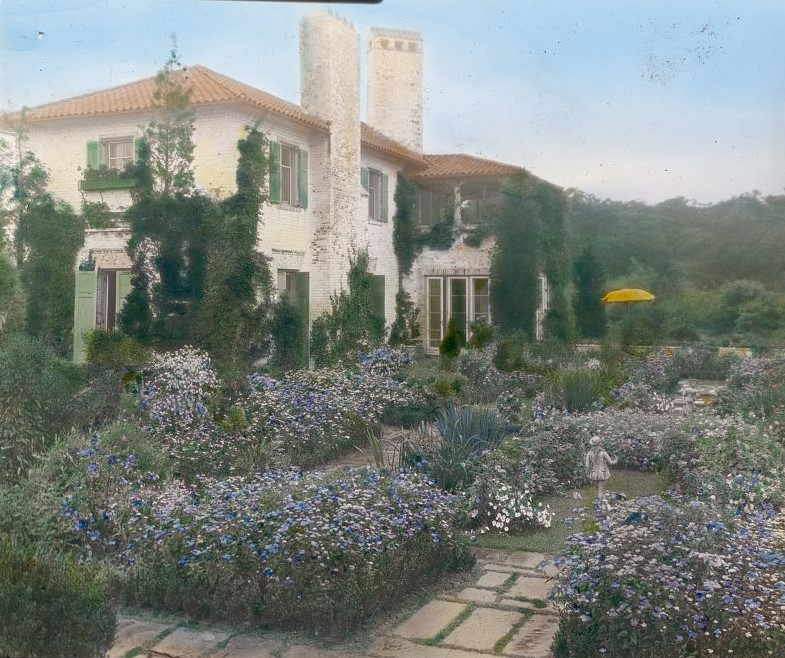
"Barberrys," the Nelson Doubleday House in Mill Neck, New York, photographed by Frances Benjamin Johnston in 1921. Architect: Harrie T. Lindeberg, (1916); Landscape: Percival Gallagher, Olmsted Brothers (1919-1924) and others

Lindeberg began his career as an assistant draftsman with the noted architecture firm McKim, Mead & White, where he assisted Stanford White with the James L. Breese House in Southampton, New York. He left the firm in 1906 to form a partnership with fellow McKim, Mead & White draftsman Lewis Colt Albro. They worked together until 1914.

After the partnership dissolved, Lindeberg continued to design works that ranged from large country estates to suburban villas. His office received commissions from across the United States. His clients included many of the leading business, professional and cultural figures of the era. In Chicago he designed fine residences on the North Shore for the Armour family; in Houston his clients included many oil barons who resided in the "Shadyside" district; in New Jersey he built for Wall Street figures and businessmen such as Gerard Lambert; on Long Island his clients were self-made millionaires in the mold of Jay Gatsby. His best-known houses include Glencraig for Michael Van Beuren in Middletown, Rhode Island and the Paul Moore residence (now demolished) in Convent Station, New Jersey.

=== Notable buildings ===
- Nester House, 1911, Geneva, New York. Listed on the National Register of Historic Places in 1984.
- Barberrys, Nelson Doubleday house, Mill Neck, New York, 1916.
- Southways (John S. Pillsbury estate), 1919, Orono, Minnesota. Demolished 2018.
- Amelita Galli-Curci Estate, 1922, Fleischmanns, New York. Listed on the National Register of Historic Places in 2010.
- Carter Hall, 1930 remodel, Millwood, Virginia. Listed on the National Register of Historic Places in 1973.
- Morrocroft, 1925-1927, Charlotte, North Carolina. Listed on the National Register of Historic Places in 1983.
- Philip D. Armour III House, 1932, Lake Bluff, Illinois. Listed on the National Register of Historic Places in 1996.
- Embassy of the United States, Helsinki, Finland, 1938. Modelled after Westover Mansion in Virginia.
- Francis Lewis Wurzburg residence in Bronxville, New York c1923. Extant today as Slonim House as Sarah Lawrence College 's Center for Continuing Education and Office of Graduate Studies

== Personal life ==
Lindeberg married (1st) Lucia Hull (marriage dissolved by divorce in 1925). They were the parents of:

- Linda Lindeberg (c. 1915–1973), a painter who married John Carrington Yates (d. 1951) in 1945. After his death, she married Giorgio Cavallon (1904–1989), an abstract artist.
- Lytle Polk Lindeberg (d. 1970), who lived on Bainbridge Island who was married to the artist Barbara Earling (1927–2007).

In 1937, Lindeberg married (2nd) Angeline Krech James, the daughter of financier Alvin W. Krech. She was previously married to Oliver Burr James, whom she divorced in 1937. Lindeberg lived, and had an office, at 277 Park Avenue in New York City.

Lindeberg died at his home in Locust Valley, New York on January 10, 1959.
