= Amelita Galli-Curci Estate =

- U.S. National Register of Historic Places
- Location within New York Location within the United States
- Nearest city: 352 and 374 Galli-Curci Road near Fleischmanns, New York
- Coordinates: 42°8′20.7306″N 74°32′8.6892″W
- Area: 137 acres (55 ha)
- Built: 1922
- Architect: Lindeberg, Harrie T.
- Architectural style: Late 19th and early 20th century revivals
- NRHP reference No.: 10000556
- Added to NRHP: August 19, 2010

Amelita Galli-Curci Estate, also known as Sul Monte, is a historic country estate located near Fleischmanns, New York, straddling the boundaries of Delaware County and Ulster County, New York. The architect Harrie T. Lindeberg (1879–1959) designed it as a country home for Italian operatic soprano Amelita Galli-Curci (1882–1963). The estate has seven contributing buildings and two contributing structures. The main house, built in 1922, is large and rambling, two-stories high, with multiple wings that wrap around a central courtyard. The structure is wood-frame construction sitting on a concrete foundation, its walls clad in variegated stone, stucco and wood, and its steeply pitched roof clad with cedar shingles. Other contributing buildings and structures include the swimming pool, stone gateposts, sheds, caretaker's cottage and dairy barn. Galli-Curci sold the estate in 1937.

It was listed on the National Register of Historic Places in 2010.

== See also ==
- National Register of Historic Places listings in Delaware County, New York
