= Denver, New York =

- Hamlet
- Location within New York Location within the United States
- Coordinates: 42°12′45″N 74°34′10″W
- Country: United States
- State: New York
- County: Delaware
- Elevation: 1,631 ft (497 m)
- Time zone: UTC-5 (Eastern (EST))
  - Summer (DST): UTC-4 (EDT)
- ZIP code: 12421
- Area code: 607
- GNIS feature ID: 972378

Denver is a hamlet in Delaware County, New York, United States. The community is 4.4 miles (7.1 km) north-northwest of Fleischmanns. Denver has a post office with ZIP code 12421.
