= Vaniškovce =

- Municipality
- Flag

- Location of Vaniškovce in the Prešov Region Location of Vaniškovce in Slovakia
- Coordinates: 49.17°N 21.30°E
- Country: Slovakia
- Region: Prešov Region
- District: Bardejov District
- First mentioned: 1345

Area
  - Total: 4.80 km^{2} (1.85 sq mi)
- Elevation: 395 m (1,296 ft)

Population (2025)
  - Total: 407
- Time zone: UTC+1 (CET)
  - Summer (DST): UTC+2 (CEST)
- Postal code: 864 1
- Area code: +421 54
- Vehicle registration plate (until 2022): BJ
- Website: www.obecvaniskovce.sk

Vaniškovce is a village and municipality in Bardejov District in the Prešov Region of north-east Slovakia.

== History ==
In historical records, the village was first mentioned in 1345.

== Geography ==
The municipality lies at an altitude of 395 metres (1,296 ft) and covers an area of 4.80 km^{2} (1.85 sq mi) (2025).

== Population ==
Population statistic (10 years)
Year	1995	2005	2015	2025
Count	344	332	382	407
Difference		−3.48%	+15.06%	+6.54%

Population statistic
Year	2024	2025
Count	401	407
Difference		+1.49%

It has a population of 407 people (31 December 2025).

=== Ethnicity ===
Census 2021 (1+ %)
Ethnicity	Number	Fraction
Slovak	353	99.43%
Total	355	

In year 2021 was 355 people by ethnicity 353 as Slovak, 2 as Rusyn, 1 as Romani and 1 as Bulgarian.

Note on population: The difference values of population numbers in the table "Population statistic" and in the sections "Ethnicity" & "Religion" is caused by the use of various statistical methods.

=== Religion ===
Census 2021 (1+ %)
Religion	Number	Fraction
Roman Catholic Church	333	93.8%
None	9	2.54%
Greek Catholic Church	5	1.41%
Other and not ascertained christian church	4	1.13%
Total	355	

In year 2021 was 355 people by religion 333 from Roman Catholic Church, 9 from None, 5 from Greek Catholic Church, 4 from Other and not ascertained christian church, 2 from Evangelical Church, 1 from Old Catholic Church and 1 from Eastern Orthodox Church.
