= St. Mark's Baptist Church (Highland Falls, New York) =

Historic church in New York, United States

- U.S. National Register of Historic Places
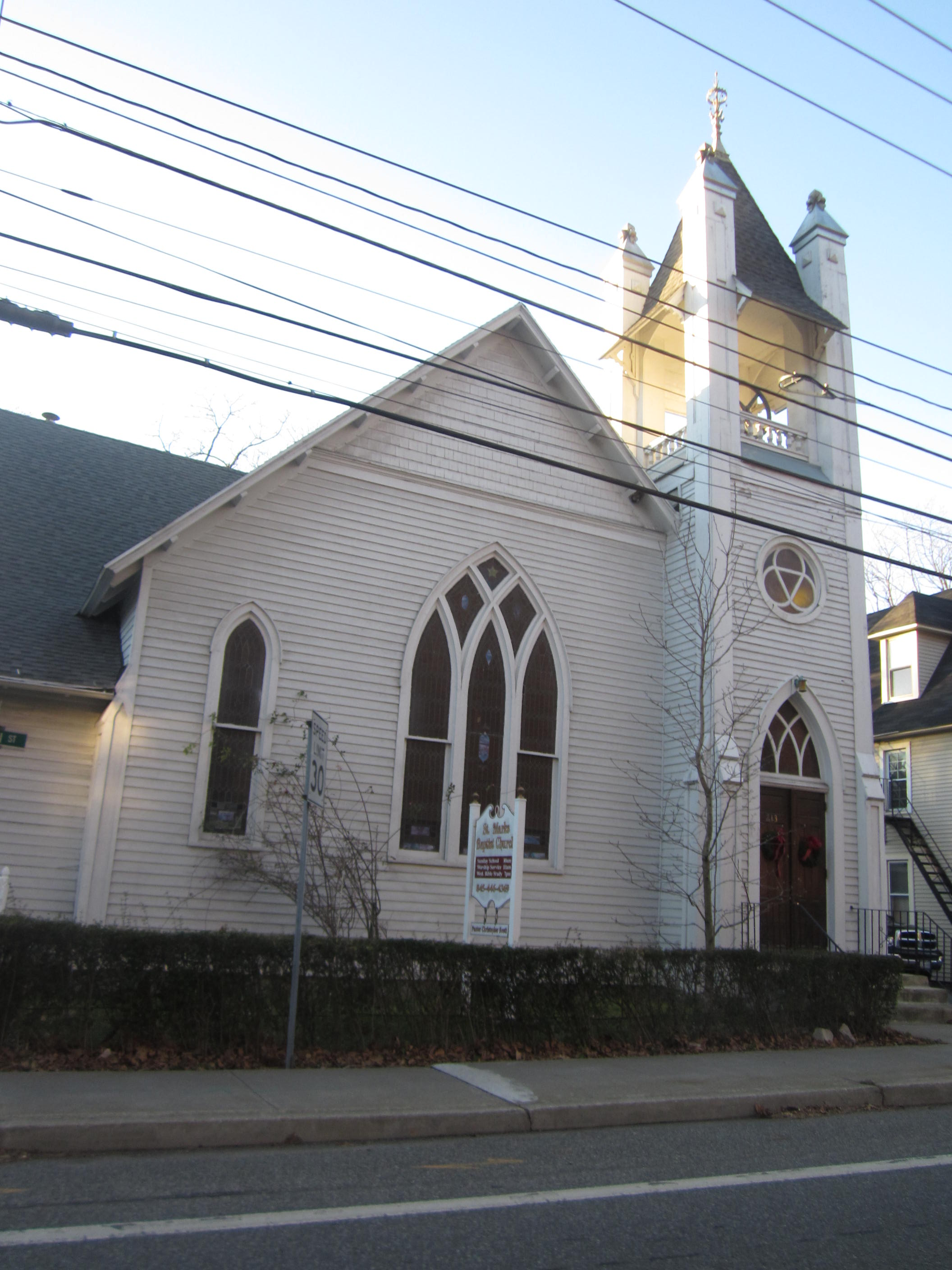
- St. Mark's Baptist Church, December 2011

- Location within New York Location within the United States
- Location: 213 Main St., Highland Falls, New York
- Coordinates: 41°22′2″N 73°57′59″W
- Area: less than one acre
- Built: 1900
- Architect: Muller Brothers
- Architectural style: Gothic Revival, Shingle Style
- NRHP reference No.: 03001516
- Added to NRHP: January 28, 2004

St. Mark's Baptist Church, formerly known as Methodist Episcopal Church of Highland Falls, is a historic Baptist church located in the village of Highland Falls, Orange County, New York. It was completed in 1900 and is a modestly scaled, one-story frame building on a limestone ashlar foundation. It features a corner steeple with buttressed corners, open belfry, and windows in the Gothic Revival style.

It was listed on the National Register of Historic Places in 2004.
