= New Kingston Presbyterian Church =

Historic church in New York, United States

- U.S. National Register of Historic Places
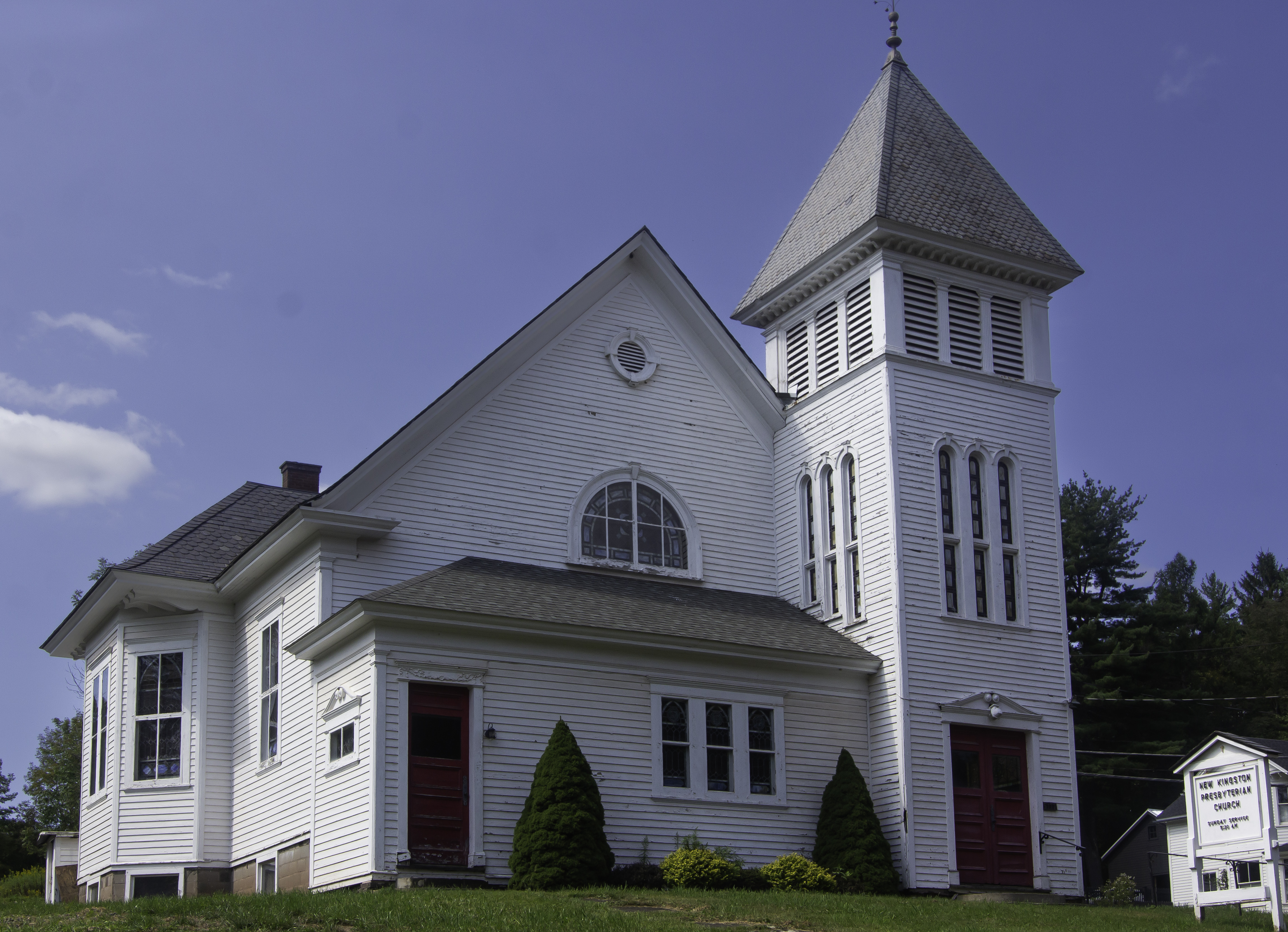

- Location within New York Location within the United States
- Location: CR 6, New Kingston, New York
- Coordinates: 42°12′48″N 74°40′57″W
- Area: less than one acre
- Built: 1900
- Architect: Scott, James A.
- Architectural style: Late Victorian
- NRHP reference No.: 02000554
- Added to NRHP: May 22, 2002

New Kingston Presbyterian Church is a historic Presbyterian church on CR 6 in New Kingston, Delaware County, New York, United States. It is a one-story, rectangular wood-frame building on a stone foundation built in 1900. It features a steep gable roof with slate shingles and a broad raking cornice. It also has a three-stage, engaged corner tower.

It was added to the National Register of Historic Places in 2002.

== See also ==
- National Register of Historic Places listings in Delaware County, New York
