= Nester House (Geneva, New York) =

Historic house in New York, United States

- U.S. National Register of Historic Places
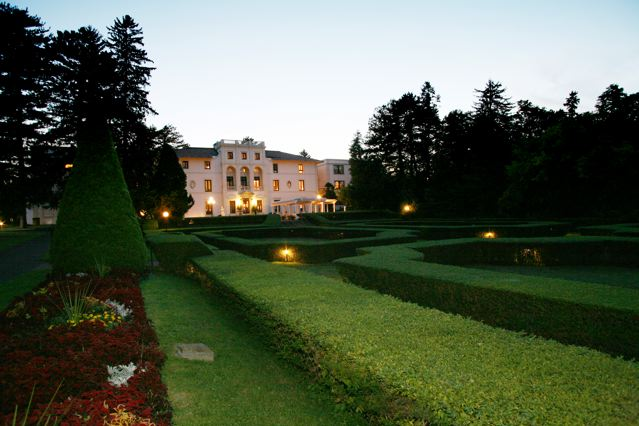

- Location within New York Location within the United States
- Nearest city: Geneva, New York
- Coordinates: 42°50′55″N 76°58′48″W
- Area: 2.5 acres (1.0 ha)
- Built: 1911
- Architect: Albro, Louis Colt; Harrie T. Lindeberg
- Architectural style: Renaissance, Italian Renaissance
- NRHP reference No.: 84002873
- Added to NRHP: April 9, 1984

Nester House, also known as Geneva-on-the-Lake, is a historic home located at Geneva in Ontario County, New York, USA. The Renaissance Revival building's design is based upon the Villa Lancellotti, a 16th-century suburban villa in the village of Frascati near Rome. It was built in 1911 and is a large three-story, U-shaped villa, built of brick and concrete block and coated in stucco. In 1949, the Capuchin Order acquired the property and operated the Immaculate Heart of Mary Seminary on the property. In 1973, the Capuchins sold the property and the house and its 1949 additions were later converted into 30 apartments. It is now operated as a resort.

It was listed on the National Register of Historic Places in 1984.
