= Dunraven, New York =

- Hamlet
- Location within New York Location within the United States
- Coordinates: 42°8′3.32″N 74°41′49.56″W
- Country: United States
- State: New York
- County: Delaware
- Town: Middletown
- Elevation: 1,352 ft (412 m)
- Time zone: UTC-5 (Eastern (EST))
  - Summer (DST): UTC-4 (EDT)
- ZIP Code: 12455 (Margaretville)
- Area codes: 845/329
- GNIS feature ID: 972399

Dunraven is a hamlet in Delaware County, New York, United States, although it is often considered part of the adjacent hamlet, Margaretville. The settlement was originally called "Clark's Factory" after the Clark family's industrial influence on the area. The first post office was established with this name on February 8, 1849. However, it was renamed "Dunraven" in March 1890. The office was officially discontinued in 1945. One of the few surviving remnants of the once-flourishing hamlet is the former District 10 School, which is listed on the National Register of Historic Places.
