= List of place names of Dutch origin in the United States =

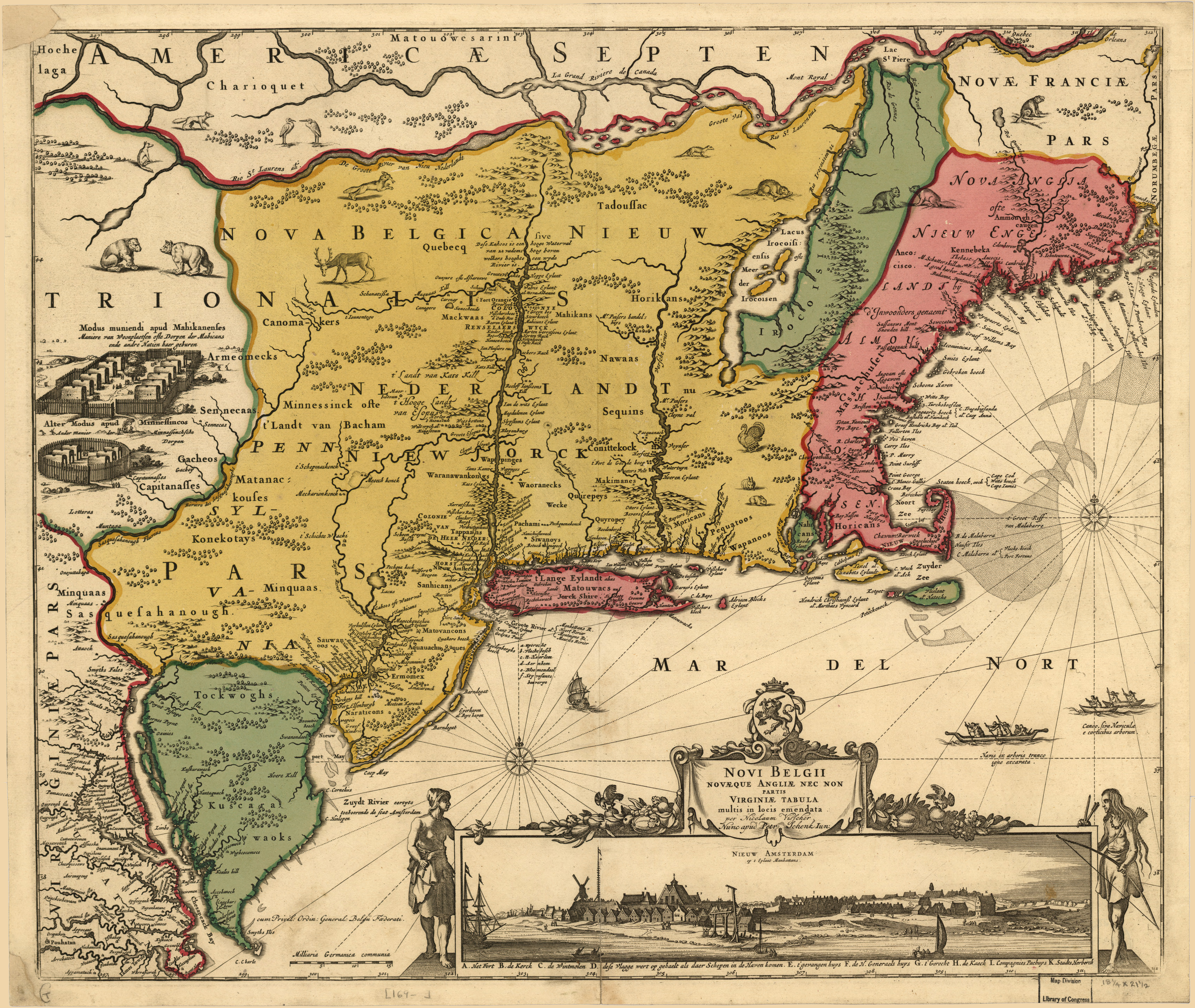
Map of New Netherland by Nicolaes Visscher (1685), including many place names in the Dutch colony

This is a list of place names in the United States that either are Dutch, were translated from Dutch, or were heavily inspired by a Dutch name or term.

== Arizona ==
- Roosevelt, Arizona

== Arkansas ==
- DeWitt, Arkansas
- Van Buren, Arkansas
- Van Buren County, Arkansas

== California ==
- Delft Colony, California
- Van Nuys
- Vandenberg Space Force Base
- Vanderbilt, California

== Colorado ==
- Jansen, Colorado
- Leyden, Colorado
- Nederland, Colorado

== Delaware ==
- Bombay Hook
- Brandywine Creek
- Bread and Cheese Island
- Cape Henlopen
- Drawyer Creek
- Murderkill River
- Prime Hook
- Reedy Point

== Florida ==
- Harlem, Florida

== Georgia ==
- Amsterdam, Georgia
- Harlem, Georgia

== Illinois ==
- DeWitt, Illinois
- DeWitt County, Illinois
- Leyden Township, Cook County, Illinois
- Schuyler County, Illinois
- South Holland, Illinois

== Indiana ==
- Holland, Indiana
- Rensselaer, Indiana
- Van Buren, Indiana

== Iowa ==
- Breda, Iowa
- DeWitt, Iowa
- Roosevelt Township, Pocahontas County, Iowa
- Van Buren, Iowa
- Van Buren County, Iowa

== Kansas ==
- Roosevelt Township, Decatur County, Kansas

== Kentucky ==
- Ghent, Kentucky
- Roosevelt, Kentucky

== Louisiana ==
- Flanders, Louisiana
- Van Buren, Louisiana
- Zwolle, Louisiana

== Maine ==
- Van Buren, Maine
- Van Buren (CDP), Maine

== Massachusetts ==
- Leyden, Massachusetts
- Middleborough, Massachusetts

== Michigan ==
- Borculo, Michigan
- DeWitt, Michigan
- DeWitt Charter Township, Michigan
- Drenthe, Michigan
- Flanders, Michigan
- Holland, Michigan
- Noordeloos, Michigan
- Overisel Township, Michigan
- Vriesland, Michigan
- Van Buren County, Michigan
- Van Dyke, Michigan
- Vanderbilt, Michigan
- Zeeland, Michigan

== Minnesota ==
- Delft, Minnesota
- Ghent, Minnesota
- Groningen, Minnesota
- Holland, Minnesota
- Hollandale, Minnesota
- Holland Township, Kandiyohi County, Minnesota
- Roosevelt, Minnesota
- Roosevelt Township, Beltrami County, Minnesota
- Roosevelt Township, Crow Wing County, Minnesota

== Mississippi ==
- Van Buren, Mississippi

== Missouri ==
- Amsterdam, Missouri
- De Witt, Missouri
- Deventer, Missouri
- JeffVanderLou, St. Louis
- Rensselaer, Missouri
- Roosevelt, Missouri
- Schuyler County, Missouri
- Van Buren, Missouri
- Vandeventer, St. Louis

== Montana ==
- Amsterdam, Montana
- Harlem, Montana
- Milligan, Montana
- Roosevelt County, Montana

== Nebraska ==
- De Witt, Nebraska
- Schuyler, Nebraska

== Nevada ==
- Vanderbilt, Nevada

== New Jersey ==
- Amsterdam, New Jersey
- Arthur Kill (Note: Also in New York.)
- Barnegat: Barnegat Bay, Barnegat Branch Trail, Barnegat Inlet, Barnegat Light, New Jersey, Barnegat Lighthouse State Park, Barnegat Peninsula, Barnegat Township, New Jersey, Barnegat (CDP), New Jersey
- Bergen: Bergen County, New Jersey, Bergen Hill, Bergen Hill, Jersey City neighborhood, Bergen Neck peninsula, Bergen Point, Bergen Square, neighborhood in Jersey City, Bergenfield, New Jersey, Bergenline Avenue, North Bergen, New Jersey
- Bloomingdale, New Jersey
- Brielle, New Jersey
- Constable Hook
- Cromakill Creek
- Cresskill, New Jersey
- Deep Voll Brook
- Dwars Kill
- Cromakill Creek and Cromakill Marsh
- Flanders, New Jersey
- Frelinghuysen Township, New Jersey
- Harlingen, New Jersey
- Hasbrouck Heights, New Jersey
- Hoboken, New Jersey
- Holland Township, New Jersey
- Houvenkopf Mountain
- Kill van Kull (Note: Also in New York.)
- Holland, Monmouth County, New Jersey
- Losen Slote Creek
- Molly Ann Brook (originally Molly's Yawn Brook)
- Overpeck Creek
- Paulins Kill
- Paulus Hook, neighborhood in Jersey City
- Pavonia Terminal, Jersey City, New Jersey
- Robbins Reef
- Roosevelt, New Jersey
- Rutgers University
- Sparkill Creek (Note: Also in New York.)
- Sandy Hook
- Skillman, New Jersey
- Teaneck, New Jersey
- Tenafly, New Jersey
- Van Vorst Park, neighborhood in Jersey City
- Voorhees Township
- Wallkill River (Note: Also in New York.)
- Wyckoff, New Jersey

== New Mexico ==
- Roosevelt County, New Mexico

== New York ==
- Alplaus Kill
- Alplaus, New York
- Amsterdam (city), New York
- Amsterdam (town), New York
- Anthony Kill
- Arbor Hill Historic District–Ten Broeck Triangle
- Arthur Kill (Note: Also in New Jersey.)
- Barneveld, New York
- Batavia Kill
- Batavia Kill (East Branch Delaware River)
- Batavia, New York
- Batavia (town), New York
- Batten Kill (Note: Also in Vermont.)
- Bear Kill
- Beaver Kill
- Beaver Kill (Alder Creek)
- Beaverkill Creek
- Bedford–Stuyvesant, Brooklyn
- Beekman Place
- Beekman, New York
- Beeren Island
- Bergen (village), New York
- Bergen Street (IND Culver Line)
- Bergen Street (IRT Eastern Parkway Line)
- Bergen, New York
- Blauvelt, New York
- Bleecker Street
- Boerum Hill
- Boght Corners, New York
- Bowery
- Bozen Kill
- Brinckerhoff, New York
- Bronx River
- The Bronx
- Brooklyn
- Bush Kill
- Bush Kill (Pepacton Reservoir tributary)
- Bushwick, Brooklyn
- Casperkill
- Catskill (town), New York
- Catskill Creek
- Catskill Mountains
- Claverack Creek
- Claverack, New York
- Cobleskill Creek
- Cobleskill (town), New York
- Coeymans, New York
- Collect Pond
- Colonie, New York
- Compaanen Kill
- Coney Island
- Cortelyou Road (BMT Brighton Line)
- Cortland County, New York
- Cortland, New York
- Cortlandt Manor, New York
- Cortlandt, New York
- Cortlandville, New York
- Cottekill, New York
- Danskammer Generating Station
- Defreestville, New York
- Delphus Kill
- DeRuyter, New York
- DeRuyter (village), New York
- Desbrosses Street (IRT Ninth Avenue Line)
- DeWitt, New York
- Dunderberg Mountain
- Dwaarkill, New York
- Dwaar Kill (Shawangunk Kill tributary)
- Dyker Heights, Brooklyn
- East Flatbush, Brooklyn
- East Fishkill, New York
- East Greenbush, New York
- East Kill
- East Nassau, New York
- East River
- Evas Kill
- Fall Kill
- Fishers Island, New York
- Fishkill Creek
- Fishkill, New York
- Flanders, New York
- Flatbush, Brooklyn
- Flushing, Queens
- Fonteyn Kill
- Fort Crailo
- Fort Schuyler
- Franklinton Vlaie
- Fresh Kills
- Gansevoort, New York
- Gerritsen Beach, Brooklyn
- Gerritsen Creek
- Ghent, New York
- Gowanus, Brooklyn
- Gramercy Park
- Gravesend, Brooklyn
- Greenburgh, New York
- Green Island, New York
- Greenwich Village
- Guilderland, New York
- Hague, New York
- Halfmoon, New York
- Harlem
- Haverstraw, New York
- Helderberg Escarpment
- Hell Gate
- Hempstead (village), New York
- Holland, New York
- Hoyt–Schermerhorn Streets (New York City Subway)
- Jan De Bakkers Kill
- Kaaterskill Creek
- Kaaterskill Falls
- Katsbaan, New York
- Kaikout Kill
- Keyser Kill
- Kill Van Kull (Note: Also in New Jersey.)
- Kinderhook (town), New York
- Kinderhook (village), New York
- Kips Bay, Manhattan
- Krum Kill
- Kykuit
- Leyden, New York
- Liberty Island
- Lincklaen, New York
- Lisha Kill, New York
- Lisha Kill
- Little Red Kill
- Little Shawangunk Kill
- Long Island
- Louse Kill
- Maiden Lane (Manhattan)
- Manor of Rensselaerswyck
- Maritje Kill
- Midwood, Brooklyn
- Mine Kill
- Moccasin Kill
- Moodna Creek
- Moordener Kill
- Muddy Kill
- Muitzes Kill
- Muitzes Kill Historic District
- Nassau (town), New York
- Nassau (village), New York
- Nassau County, New York
- Nassau Street (Manhattan)
- New Dorp, Staten Island
- New Utrecht, Brooklyn
- Normans Kill
- North Greenbush, New York
- North River (Hudson River)
- Nostrand Avenue
- Old Fort Schuyler
- Old Town, Staten Island
- Orange County, New York
- Orangetown, New York
- Otter Kill
- Ox Kill
- Oyster Bay (hamlet), New York
- Oyster Bay (town), New York
- Paerdegat Basin
- Peekskill, New York
- Plattekill (town), New York
- Platte Kill
- Plotter Kill (Mohawk River)
- Plotter Kill Preserve
- Poestenkill (CDP), New York
- Poestenkill, New York
- Pollepel Island
- Port of Albany–Rensselaer
- Prospect Lefferts Gardens
- Punch Kill
- Quackenkill, New York
- Quacken Kill
- Red Hook (village), New York
- Red Hook, Brooklyn
- Red Hook, New York
- Red Kill
- Remsen Village, Brooklyn
- Rensselaer County
- Rensselaer, New York
- Rensselaer Falls, New York
- Rensselaerville, New York
- Rhinebeck (town), New York
- Rhinebeck (village), New York
- Rikers Island
- Rip Van Winkle Bridge
- Roaring Kill
- Roeliff Jansen Kill
- Rondout, New York
- Roosevelt, New York
- Roosevelt Island
- Rotterdam (CDP), New York
- Rotterdam (town), New York
- St. Mark's Church in-the-Bowery
- Sandsea Kill
- Saugerties, New York
- Saw Kill
- Sawyer Kill
- Schermerhorn Row Block
- Schuyler, New York
- Schuyler Creek
- Schuyler County, New York
- Schuyler Mansion
- Shawangunk Kill
- Shawangunk, New York
- Shawangunk Ridge
- Spackenkill, New York
- Sparkill Creek (Note: Also in New Jersey.)
- Speigletown, New York
- Spuyten Duyvil Bridge
- Spuyten Duyvil Creek
- Spuyten Duyvil, Bronx
- Staatsburg, New York
- Staten Island
- Stuyvesant Street
- Swartekill, New York
- Switz Kill
- Tappan Zee Bridge
- Ten Broeck Mansion
- Todt Hill
- Tremper Kill
- Valatie, New York
- Martin Van Buren National Historic Site
- Van Buren, New York
- Van Cortlandt Village
- Van Nest, Bronx
- Van Pelt Manor
- Verplanck, New York
- Verf Kill
- Verkeerder Kill
- Verkeerder Kill Falls
- Vloman Kill
- Vly Mountain
- Voorheesville, New York
- Wall Street
- Wallabout Bay
- Wallabout, Brooklyn
- Wallkill, New York
- Wallkill River (Note: Also in New Jersey.)
- Watervliet, New York
- West Kill
- West Kill (North Blenheim, Schoharie Creek)
- Wyckoff Heights, New York
- Wynantskill, New York
- Wynants Kill
- Yonkers, New York

== North Dakota ==
- Hague, North Dakota
- Roosevelt Township, Renville County, North Dakota

== Ohio ==
- Amsterdam, Ohio
- Antwerp, Ohio
- Ghent, Ohio
- New Holland, Ohio
- Van Buren, Ohio
- Van Buren Lake

== Oklahoma ==
- Roosevelt, Oklahoma

== Pennsylvania ==
- Amsterdam, Pennsylvania
- Bushkill, Pennsylvania
- East Vandergrift, Pennsylvania
- Marcus Hook, Pennsylvania
- New Holland, Pennsylvania
- Vanderbilt, Pennsylvania
- Vandergrift, Pennsylvania

== Rhode Island ==
- Rhode Island
- Block Island

== South Carolina ==
- Orangeburg
- Orangeburg County

== South Dakota ==
- New Holland, South Dakota

== Tennessee ==
- Van Buren, Tennessee
- Van Buren County, Tennessee

== Texas ==
- Amsterdam, Texas
- DeWitt County, Texas
- Harlingen, Texas
- Nederland, Texas
- Roosevelt, Kimble County, Texas
- Roosevelt, Lubbock County, Texas
- Vanderbilt, Texas
- Vandyke, Texas

== Utah ==
- Roosevelt, Utah

== Vermont ==
- Batten Kill (Note: Also in New York.)
- Holland, Vermont

== Virginia ==
- Amsterdam, Virginia
- DeWitt, Virginia
- Ghent Neighborhood in Norfolk, Virginia
- Hague, Virginia
- Hans Meadow
- Schuyler, Virginia
- Vandyke, Virginia

== Washington ==
- Roosevelt, Seattle
- Roosevelt, Washington
- Roosevelt Glacier
- Vancouver, Washington

== West Virginia ==
- Brabant, West Virginia
- Dewitt, West Virginia
- Ghent, West Virginia

== Wisconsin ==
- Barneveld, Wisconsin
- Friesland, Wisconsin
- Holland, La Crosse County, Wisconsin
- Hollandtown, Wisconsin
- Leyden, Wisconsin
- Oostburg, Wisconsin
- Roosevelt, Burnett County, Wisconsin
- Roosevelt, Oneida County, Wisconsin
- Roosevelt, Taylor County, Wisconsin
- Van Buren, Wisconsin

== See also ==
- List of New Netherland placename etymologies
- List of non-US places that have a US place named after them
