= Brown's Station =

"Browns Station" may refer to:

- Brown's Station, New York, a village submerged by the Ashokan Reservoir
  - Brown's Railroad Station, a railroad depot that served the village
- Brown's Station, former name for the community of Browns, Boone County, Missouri
- Brown's Station, former name for the community of Browns, Ohio in Preble County

== See also ==
- Brown Station, an Argentine Antarctic base and research station
