= Red Kill =

Red Kill may refer to:

- Red Kill (Bush Kill tributary), New York State
- Red Kill (Schoharie Creek tributary), New York State; see Schoharie Creek

== See also ==
- Little Red Kill, a stream in New York State
