= Dwaar Kill =

Dwaar Kill, Dwaarkill or Dwars Kill may refer to:

In New Jersey:

- Dwars Kill, a tributary of the Hackensack River (Oradell Reservoir)

In New York:

- Dwaar Kill (Shawangunk Kill), a tributary of the Shawangunk Kill
- Dwaar Kill (Wallkill River), a tributary of the Wallkill River
- Dwaarkill, New York, a hamlet in the town of Shawangunk
