= Beaverkill =

Beaverkill may refer to:

In New York:

- Beaverkill Bridge, a covered bridge in Sullivan County
- Beaverkill Creek, a former tributary of Esopus Creek
- Beaver Kill, a tributary of the East Branch of the Delaware River
