= Schoharie Bridge =

- Schoharie Bridge over Fox Creek as photographed 11 March 2008
- Coordinates: 42°40′47″N 74°18′04″W
- Carries: Pedestrians only
- Crosses: Fox Creek

Characteristics
- Total length: 115 feet

Schoharie Bridge, also known as Fox Creek Bridge, is a wooden covered bridge over Fox Creek down the road from the Old Stone Fort in Schoharie County, New York.
