= Gallupville Evangelical Lutheran Church =

Historic church in New York, United States

- U.S. National Register of Historic Places
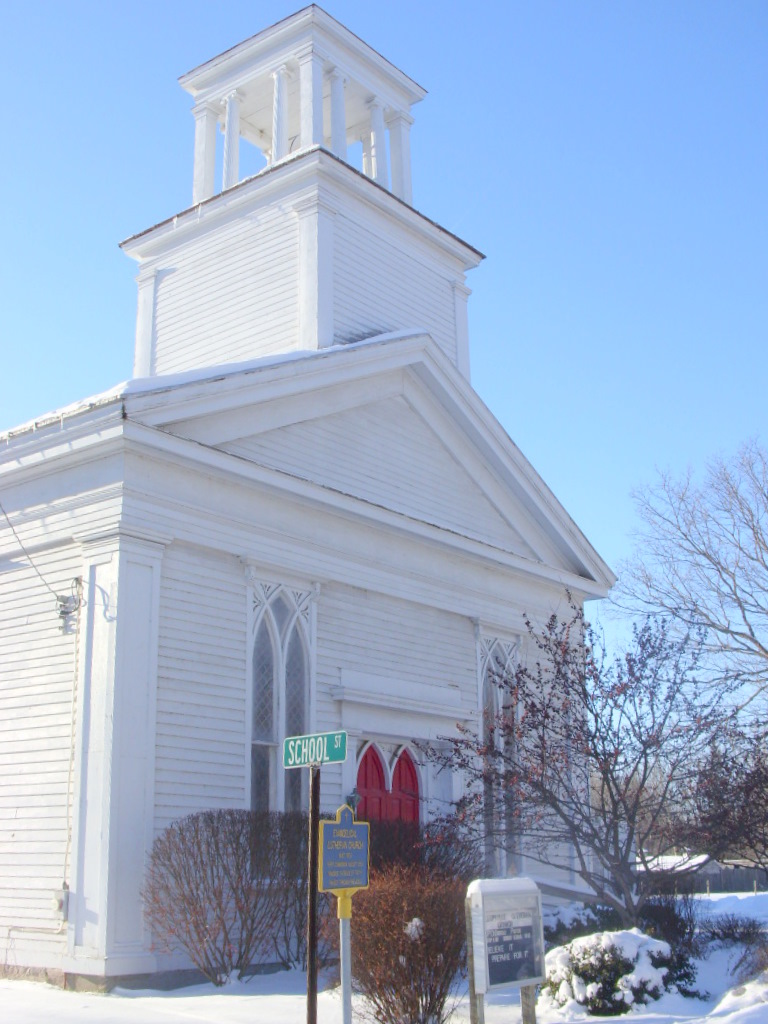
- Gallupville Evangelical Lutheran Church, January 2009

- Location within New York Location within the United States
- Location: 890 NY 443, Gallupville, New York
- Coordinates: 42°39′48″N 74°14′4″W
- Area: less than one acre
- Built: 1853
- Architect: Wolford, Jacob
- Architectural style: Greek Revival
- NRHP reference No.: 02001652
- Added to NRHP: December 31, 2002

Gallupville Evangelical Lutheran Church is a historic Evangelical Lutheran church on 890 NY 443 in Gallupville, Schoharie County, New York. It is a rectangular, gable roofed, timber framed structure with narrow clapboard siding in the vernacular Greek Revival style. It was built in 1853 and a two bay, gable roofed Sunday School parish wing was added about 1964. A large two floor parish hall was added about 2002 that includes classrooms, offices, youth room, nursery, library, food pantry and storage areas.

When the church was founded it belonged to the Augustana Synod and later was a congregation of the Lutheran Church in America (LCA). Later the LCA and several other Lutheran synods joined together to form the Evangelical Lutheran Church in America (ELCA). In 2010, Evangelical left the ELCA to become a charter congregation of the newly formed North American Lutheran Church.

It was listed on the National Register of Historic Places in 2002.
