= Gallupville Methodist Church =

Historic church in New York, United States

- U.S. National Register of Historic Places
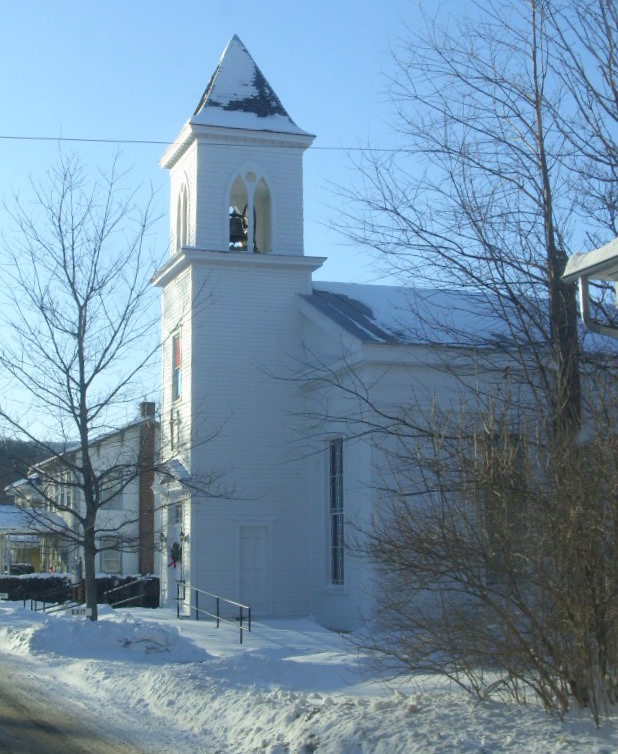
- Gallupville Methodist Church, January 2009

- Location within New York Location within the United States
- Location: Factory St., Gallupville, New York
- Coordinates: 42°39′45″N 74°14′3″W
- Area: less than one acre
- Built: 1844
- Architectural style: Greek Revival, Romanesque
- NRHP reference No.: 01000584
- Added to NRHP: May 30, 2001

Gallupville Methodist Church is a historic church in Gallupville, Schoharie County, New York. The original Greek Revival style church structure is a three-by-three-bay, plain frame structure with a small, single-story rear wing built about 1844. In 1896, a central Romanesque-style two-stage, engaged entry/bell tower was added.

It was listed on the National Register of Historic Places in 2001, but additional information has yet to be digitized.
