= Niskayuna Reformed Church =

Historic church in New York, United States

- U.S. National Register of Historic Places
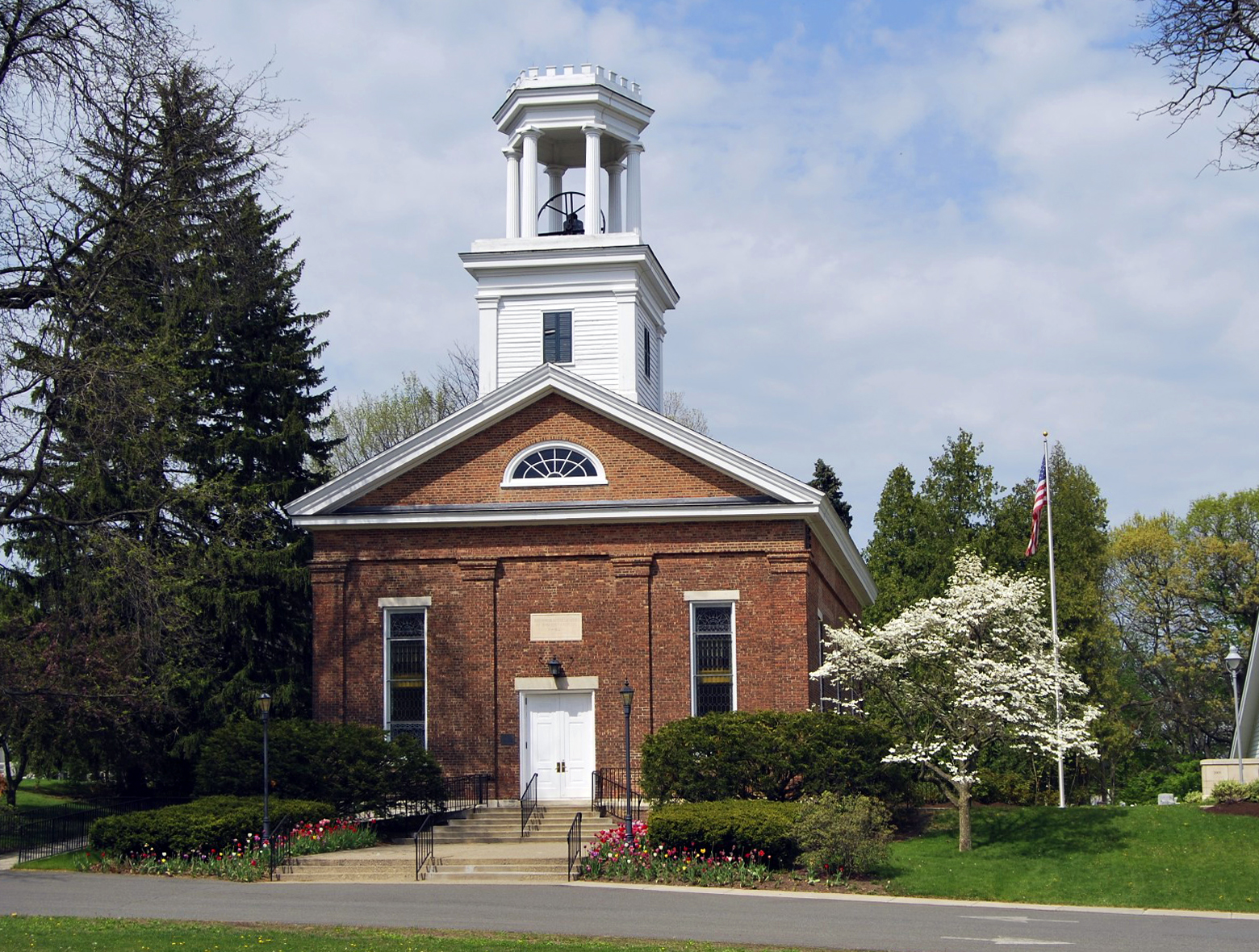
- Niskayuna Reformed Church, May 2010

- Location within New York Location within the United States
- Location: 3041 Troy-Schenectady Rd., Niskayuna, New York
- Coordinates: 42°46′34″N 73°49′56″W
- Area: 3.5 acres (1.4 ha)
- Built: 1852
- Architectural style: Greek Revival
- NRHP reference No.: 79001628
- Added to NRHP: April 18, 1979

Niskayuna Reformed Church is a historic Dutch Reformed church located at 3041 Troy-Schenectady Road in Niskayuna in Schenectady County, New York. It was built in 1852 and is a brick, gable-roofed building in the Greek Revival style. It has brick pilasters and a brick frieze around the entire building. It features a two-stage central tower consisting of a square section surmounted by an open hexagonal belfry. The adjacent cemetery contains burials dating to the late 18th century. Another reformed church at Lisha Kill, built in 1854, is very similar in design.

The church was added to the National Register of Historic Places in 1979.

== Gallery ==
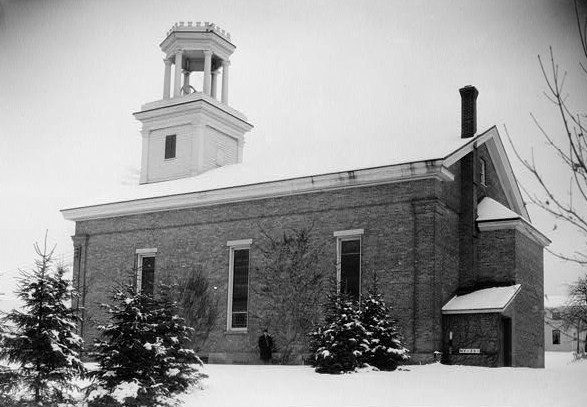
Niskayuna Reformed Church, HABS photo
