= Dry Brook (East Branch Delaware River tributary) =

Location
- Country: United States
- State: New York

Physical characteristics
- Source
  - location: Delaware County, New York
- Mouth: East Branch Delaware River
  - location: Arkville, Delaware County, New York, United States
  - coordinates: 42°09′05″N 74°37′48″W
- Basin size: 82.5 mi^{2} (214 km^{2})

Basin features
- Tributaries
  - left: Flatiron Brook
  - right: Shandaken Brook, Todd Brook, Bush Kill

Dry Brook is a stream that flows into the East Branch Delaware River near Arkville, New York.
