= Batavia Kill =

Batavia Kill may refer to the following creeks:

- Batavia Kill (East Branch Delaware River tributary), in New York
- Batavia Kill (Schoharie Creek tributary), in New York
