= Fox Creek (Schoharie Creek tributary) =

- Schoharie Bridge over Fox Creek on March 11, 2008

- Location of the mouth within New York Fox Creek (Schoharie Creek tributary) (the United States)

Location
- Country: United States
- State: New York
- Region: Capital
- Counties: Albany, Schoharie

Physical characteristics
- Source
  - location: Berne
  - coordinates: 42°35′00″N 74°02′27″W
  - elevation: 1,420 ft (430 m)
- Mouth: Schoharie Creek
  - location: Schoharie
  - coordinates: 42°41′17″N 74°18′30″W
  - elevation: 581 ft (177 m)
- Length: 24.8 mi (39.9 km)

Basin features
- Tributaries
  - left: Switz Kill
  - right: Beaverdam Creek, Ox Kill, King Creek, Louse Kill

Fox Creek is a 24.8-mile-long (39.9 km) tributary of Schoharie Creek in Schoharie and Albany counties in the U.S. state of New York. It rises in the southeastern part of the town of Berne, west of the Helderberg Mountains, and flows west, passing through the hamlets of East Berne, Bensons Corner, Berne, and West Berne, continuing through the town of Wright, where it passes the hamlets of Gallupville and Shutter Corners before entering the town of Schoharie, where it flows into Schoharie Creek near the hamlet of Vroman Corners. Fox Creek is part of the Hudson River watershed, Via Schoharie Creek and the Mohawk River.

Near its mouth it is crossed by the Schoharie Bridge, a covered bridge near the Old Stone Fort, an American Revolutionary War-era structure.

== Hydrology ==
The United States Geological Survey (USGS) maintains stream gauges along Fox Creek. The station on Drebitko Road, 2.9 miles (4.7 km) northeast of Schoharie has been recording daily measurements since 2017. It had a maximum discharge of 7,840 cubic feet (222 m^{3}) per second on April 4, 1987, which is outside the period of record and therefore estimated and a minimum discharge of 2.3 cubic feet (0.065 m^{3}) per second on July 16–17, 2018.

== Tributaries ==
Louse Kill converges with Fox Creek near Schoharie, New York. Ox Kill converges with Fox Creek near Gallupville, New York. King Creek converges with Fox Creek in Gallupville, New York.

== See also ==
- List of rivers of New York
