= Emory Brook =

Location
- Country: United States
- State: New York

Physical characteristics
- Source
  - location: Delaware County, New York
- Mouth: Bush Kill
  - location: Fleischmanns, New York, Delaware County, New York, United States
  - coordinates: 42°09′20″N 74°31′50″W
- Basin size: 6.95 mi^{2} (18.0 km^{2})

Emory Brook flows into Bush Kill by Fleischmanns, New York.
