= Vly Creek =

Location
- Country: United States
- State: New York

Physical characteristics
- Source
  - location: Greene County, New York
- Mouth: Bush Kill
  - location: Fleischmanns, New York, Delaware County, New York, United States
  - coordinates: 42°09′20″N 74°31′50″W
- Basin size: 22.6 mi^{2} (59 km^{2})

Basin features
- Tributaries
  - left: Elk Creek
  - right: West Settlement Creek

Vly Creek is a river in Delaware County and Greene County in New York. It flows into Bush Kill by Fleischmanns, New York. It flows through Lake Switzerland.
