= Gallupville House =

- U.S. National Register of Historic Places
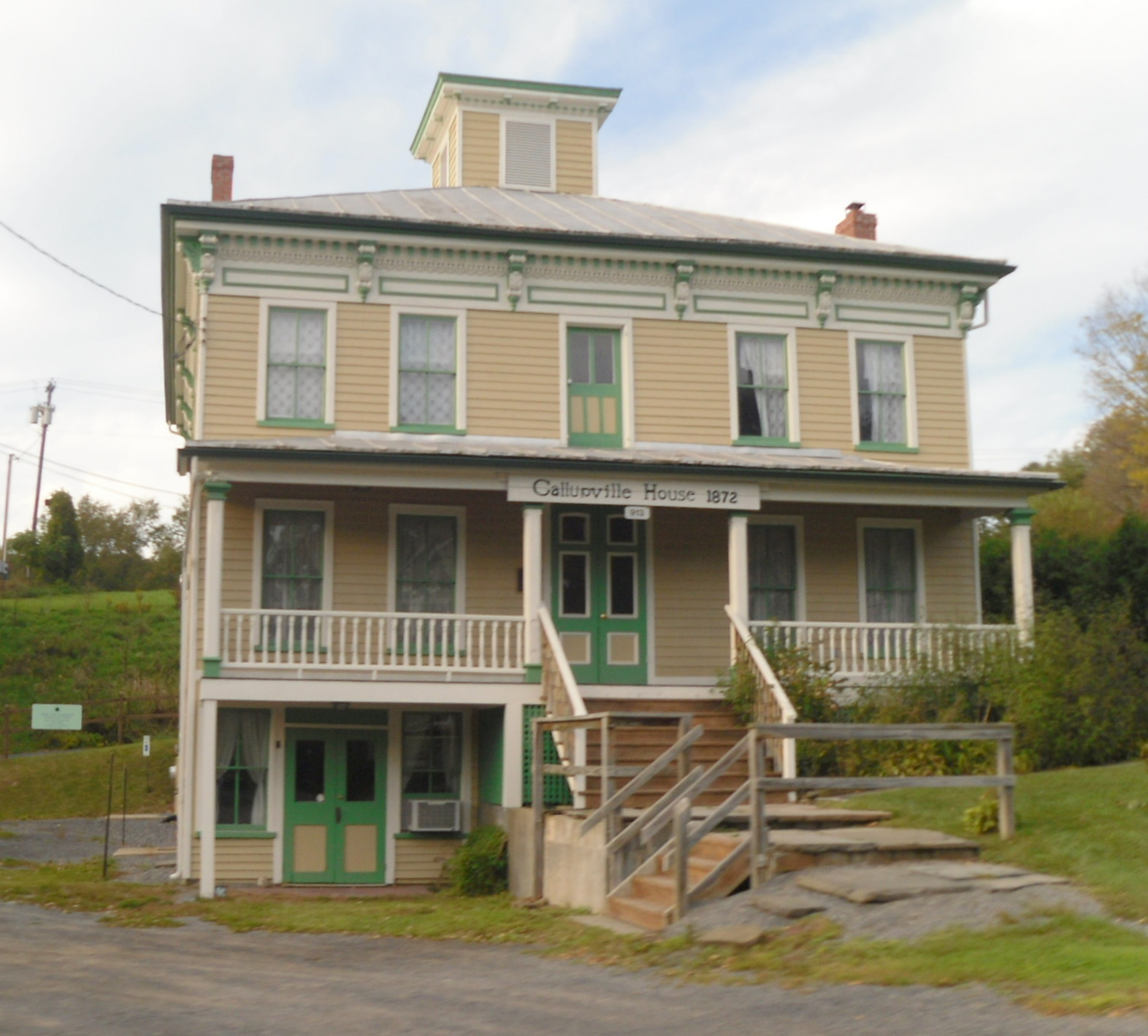
- Gallupville House, September 2010

- Location within New York Location within the United States
- Location: Main St., Gallupville, New York
- Coordinates: 42°39′46″N 74°13′58″W
- Area: 0.8 acres (0.32 ha)
- Built: 1872
- NRHP reference No.: 79001629
- Added to NRHP: September 7, 1979

Gallupville House, also known as Old Hall, is a historic hotel located at Gallupville in Schoharie County, New York. It was built in 1872 and is a 2 1/2-story wood-frame building, with a 1-story porch on the front and a 2-story addition in the rear dated to 1890. It features a hipped tin roof crowned by a large square cupola. It was used as a hotel into the 1920s when it was converted to the I.O.O.F. Hall. It was later used by the local Grange and for town offices.

It was listed on the National Register of Historic Places in 1979.
