= Fonteyn Kill =

Urban stream in New York, US

Fonteyn Kill Fonteynkill, Fountain Kill, Mill Cove Brook
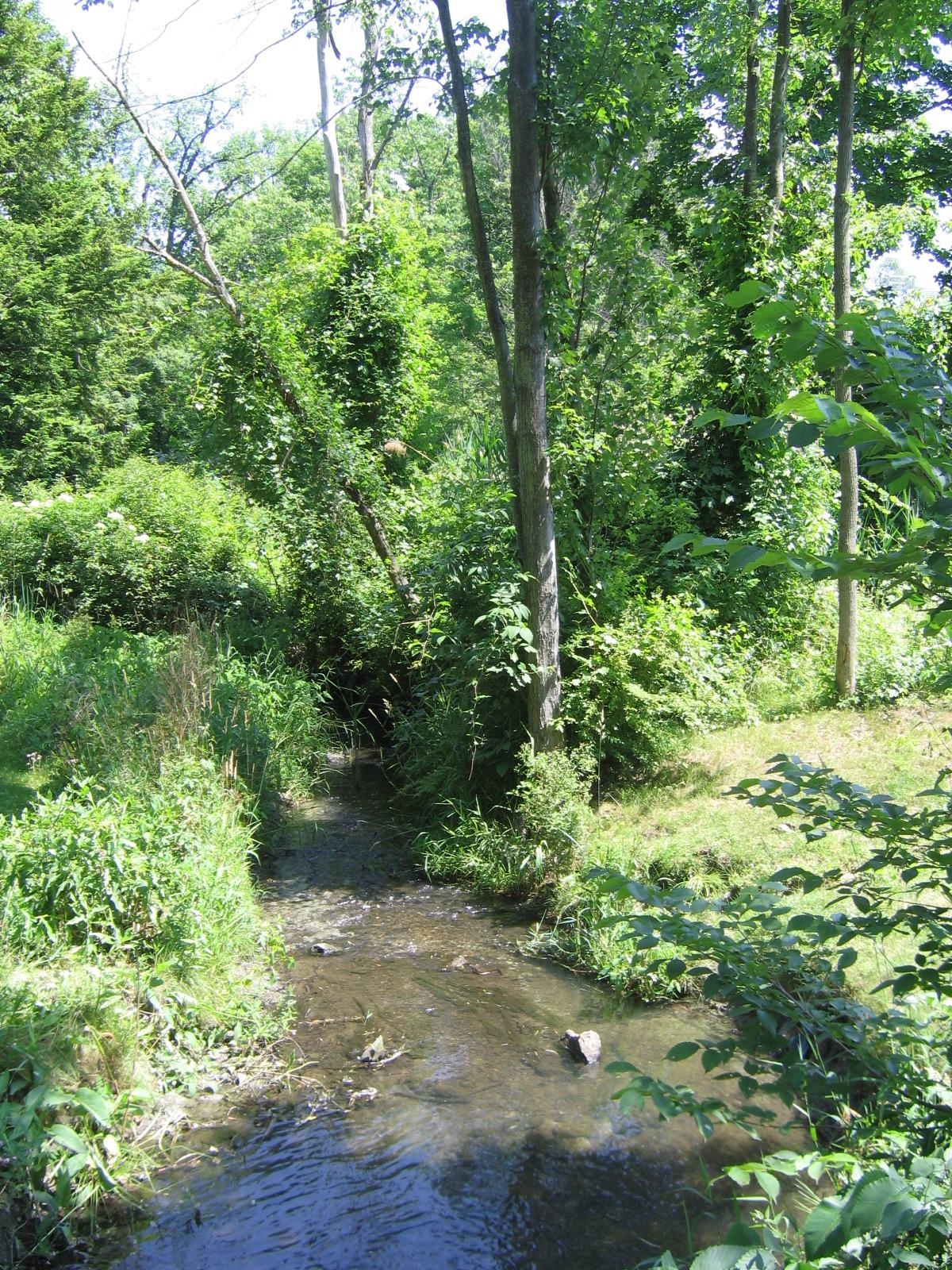
- The Fonteyn Kill near its confluence with the Casperkill in June 2007
- Etymology: Dutch for Spring Brook

Physical characteristics
- Source
  - location: Unknown, flows from a culvert beneath Park Avenue
  - coordinates: 41.68898°N 73.90618°W
- Mouth
  - location: Casperkill
  - coordinates: 41.6830800°N 73.8932900°W
- Length: 1.5 km (0.93 mi)

Basin features
- Progression: Casperkill, Hudson River
- Waterbodies: Vassar Lake

The Fonteyn Kill (alternatively written Fonteynkill and also known as Fountain Kill and Mill Cove Brook) is a 1.5-kilometer-long (0.93 mi) urban stream (or kill) flowing through Dutchess County, New York, onto the campus of Vassar College, and into the Casperkill. The stream was first on land inhabited by the native Wappinger band before being transferred to the Dutch and then the British. A mill was built along the kill by 1714 and the stream's presence influenced Matthew Vassar's decision to locate his college in the area. The artificial Vassar Lake lies midway down the Fonteyn Kill and was once used for ice skating and boating.

While historically pure, the stream now suffers from urban stream syndrome, partially due to the amount of impervious surfaces within its watershed. Flowing over glacial till, the stream's bed is rich in cobbles and the kill supports populations of benthic macroinvertebrates, trees, shrubs, fish, birds, snapping turtles, and frogs. As of 2016, a Vassar–Cornell University program is monitoring the water quality of the Fonteyn Kill.

== Course ==
The Fonteyn Kill is 1.5 kilometers (0.93 mi) long. Historian Helen Wilkinson Reynolds reported in 1924 that the stream is fed by a spring in Arlington, New York. More recently, the exact source of the kill has been reported as unknown. Historical records indicate a variety of courses once followed by the stream. A 2010 study observed that the Fonteyn Kill flows from a culvert beneath Park Avenue in an eastward direction through an urban zone before turning southward and feeding into the artificial Vassar Lake. It then flows southeastward beneath Raymond Avenue through the campus of Vassar College, beneath the college's Bridge for Laboratory Sciences, and into the Casperkill just below Sunset Lake at a location once dubbed "The Meeting of the Waters". The Fonteyn Kill is the only perennial tributary of the Casperkill, itself a tributary of the Hudson River. In 1924, the Fonteyn Kill was noted as having several small tributaries, primarily "small meadow-runs, largely surface-water".

== Watershed and hydrology ==
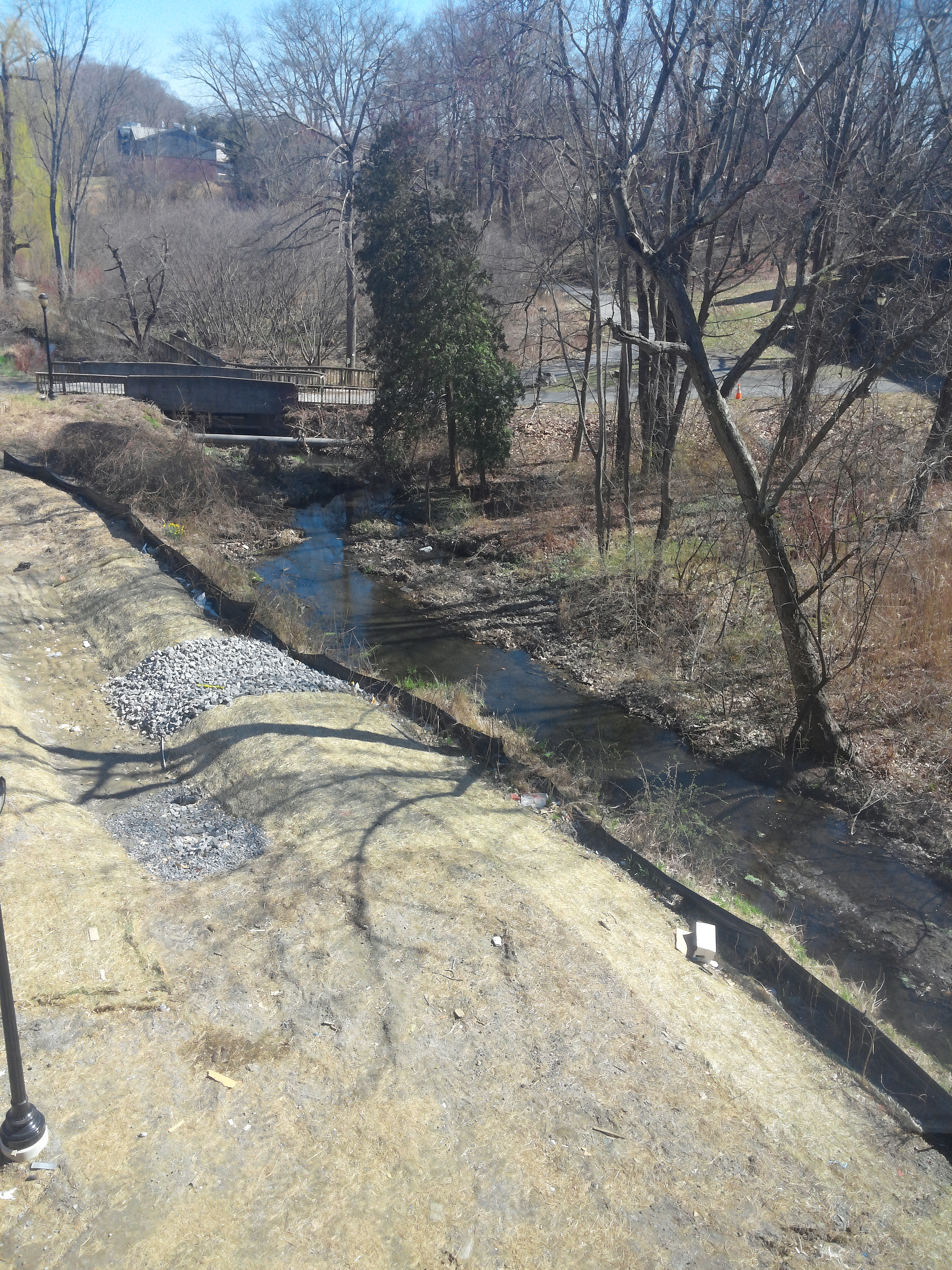
The Fonteyn Kill looking downstream towards the Ecological Laboratory (right) from the Bridge for Laboratory Sciences

Historically, the Fonteyn Kill's water has been noted for its cleanness. In 1924, the stream's "purity" was noted while an 1867 book describes the kill's waters as "pellucid". More recently, the stream has been cited as suffering from urban stream syndrome. (Note: Urban stream syndrome is a condition of streams that drain urban areas characterized by increased erosive and overland flow frequency, decreased nutrient uptake and retention of organic matter, and a variety of other hydrological, chemical, morphological, and ecological changes.) Surfaces surrounding the Fonteyn Kill are highly impervious; the stream drains an urban zone of the city of Poughkeepsie, New York, of which over 60% is impervious. The exact size of the kill's watershed is not known; an area at least as large as the known watershed is presumed to contribute to the stream's flow in the form of storm drainage. In spite of this, the stream itself is bordered by a combination of residential lots and forested swaths ranging from 4–70 meters (13–230 ft) in width. On Vassar's campus, the kill runs along the 4-acre (1.6 ha) outdoor Edith Roberts Ecological Laboratory and past the school's Shakespeare Garden.

A 2010 study of the stream found that the Fonteyn Kill's specific conductance, a measure of the amount of dissolved road salt in the stream's water, was nearly 1.0 mS/cm, higher than any value recorded in the Casperkill. Sites upstream of Vassar Lake were recorded in a separate study as having specific conductances twice as high as locations downstream of the lake, suggesting a regulating effect caused by water mixing and retention in Vassar Lake. The total inorganic nitrogen in the kill, which is usually correlated with surrounding green cover, was about 0.6 milligrams per liter (2.2×10^{−8} lb/cu in), average for measurements taken in the Fonteyn Kill and Casperkill in that study. The study also found that the Fonteyn Kill's score on the Hilsenhoff family biotic index (HBI), a scale measuring pollution based on the tolerance of endemic benthic macroinvertebrates, was approximately six, indicating fairly poor water quality, with scores for the rest of the Casperkill–Fonteyn Kill watershed were as high as seven (poor water quality) to as low as four (very good water quality). (Note: HBI scores are calculated as $HBI=\frac{\sum n_{i}\times a_{i}}{N}$, where n_{i} is the number of taxa i collected, a_{i} is the tolerance value for taxon i, and N is the total number of sampled specimens. Scores ranging from 5.76–6.50 indicate "fairly poor" water quality and that "substantial pollution [is] likely" in the sampled body of water.)

In 2015, Riverkeeper was alerted of a sewage leak in the kill, noting high levels of bacteria indicating the presence of fecal matter. A New York State Department of Environmental Conservation (DEC) investigation found nearby private sewer pipes and manholes to be filled with sludge; they were cleaned and plans have been instated to ensure that sewers would stay clear henceforth. An oil spill was observed in the kill in 2016 and DEC staff were again sent to respond. The DEC installed booms to absorb the oil and began an investigation into the spill's source, which was unknown as of December 6.

Efforts are being made to monitor the water quality of the Fonteyn Kill, led by Vassar College's Environmental Research Institute and the Cornell University Cooperative Extension Dutchess County Environment Program. Three sites are regularly sampled for water quality while devices such as sondes continuously record temperature, conductivity, and pH. Benthic macroinvertebrates are frequently counted and fecal coliform counts are also run.

== Geography and geology ==
Cambrian to Ordovician-age dolomite, part of the Wappinger Group, and calcareous shales from the Hudson River Group underlie the Fonteyn Kill. Between 15 and 20 kya, a glacial lake covered the land that would become the Fonteyn Kill. Till and to a lesser extent other glacial sediments today sit atop the dolomite and shale. Surrounding soils are loamy, either silt loam or gravelly loam depending on the underlying surficial geology. The streambed is composed of about 25% sand, silt, and clay and approximately 75% cobbles. Quicksand was once common around the Fonteyn Kill and its minor tributaries. The distance covered by the stream is noted as being relatively flat, descending between 6.1–9.1 meters (20–30 ft) over the course of its run.

Vassar Lake, through which the kill passes, is a shallow body of water, measured in 2013 with a maximum depth of 1.8 meters (5 ft 11 in) and an average depth of 0.55 meters (1 ft 10 in).

== Biology ==
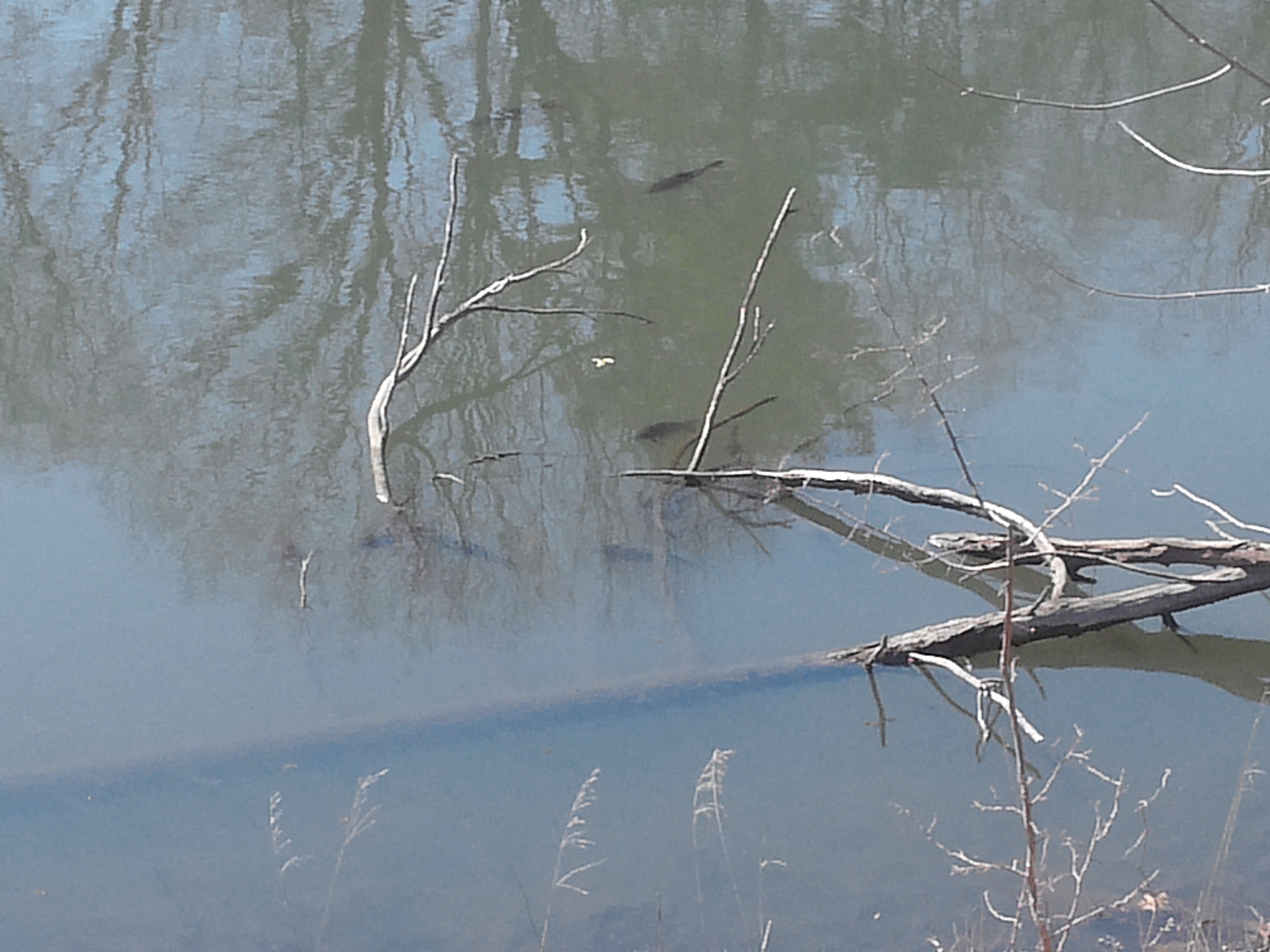
Several fish near the surface of Vassar Lake

The Fonteyn Kill and its riparian zone are home to a variety of species. Caddisflies, clams and mussels, crayfish (Astacidae), damselflies, gammarids, isopods (Asellidae), oligochaetes, black flies, leeches, chironomids, bladder snails, and other snails were recorded in the stream in 2010. Trees along the banks of the Fonteyn Kill include American elms, sugar maples, black cherries, Norway maples, and red maples, while barberry, privet, holly, Japanese knotweed, honeysuckle, spicebush, common reeds, and Japanese roses make up the kill's riparian shrubs. Carp, mallards, great blue herons, frogs, snapping turtles, and other birds also reside in and around the stream. A 1924 source observed that trout fishing occurred on the kill.

== History ==
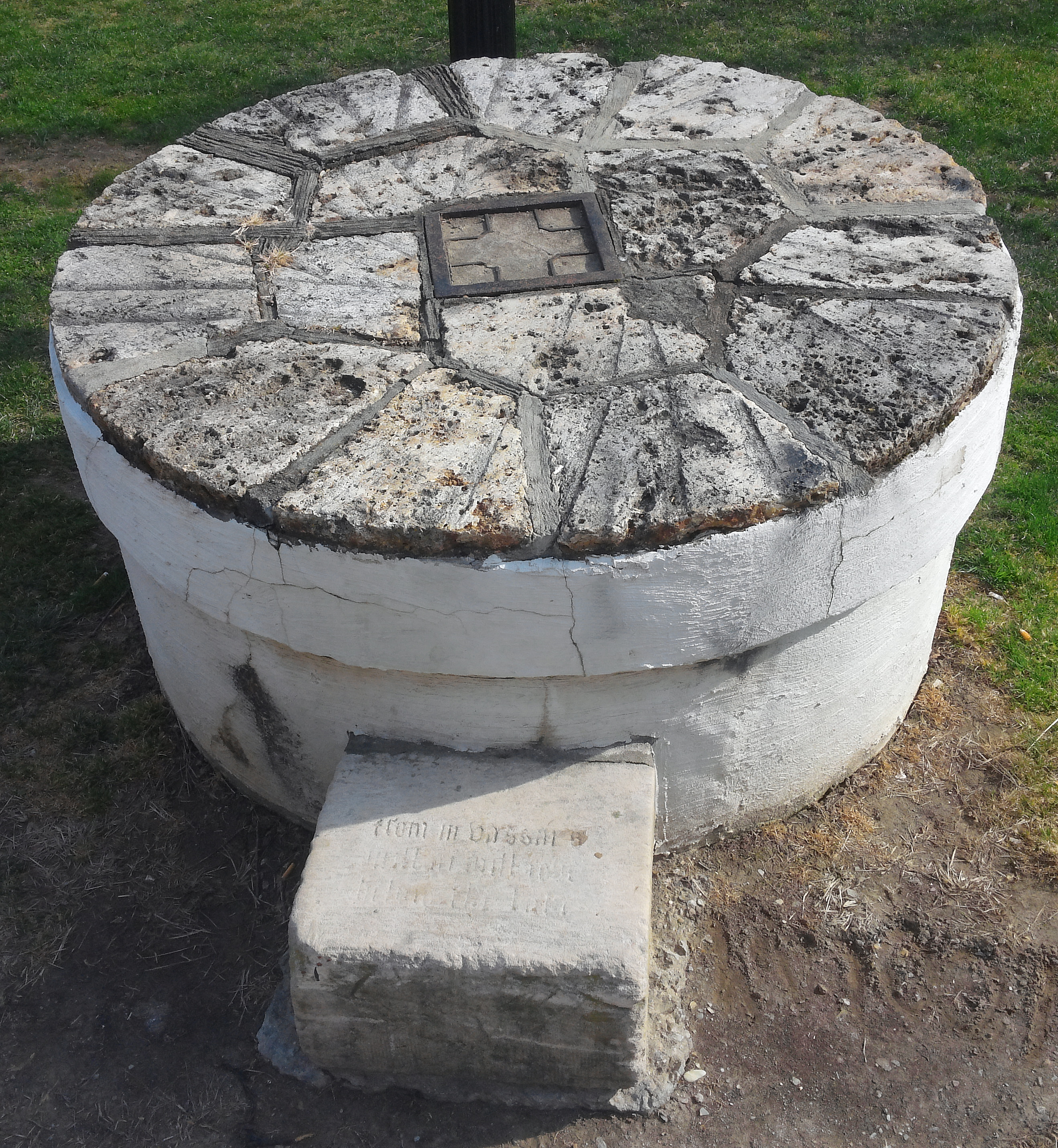
The millstone from the Fonteynkill mill, now in front of Rockefeller Hall

The Fonteyn Kill flows through land originally inhabited by the Wappinger band which, throughout the 1600s, came under Dutch control. The Dutch lost control of the territory to the British in 1664 and Dutchess County was established. In 1688, Pieter Schuyler was granted a title to the land through which the Fonteyn Kill runs. He split that land and sold the Fonteyn Kill tract (soon to be known as Het Oosten or "Eastward Neighborhood") in 1699 to Myndert Harmense and Robert Sanders.

A mill was built along the stream before 1714; in that year, Sanders's son Thomas sold the structure to Isaac Tietsoort who in turn sold it to March Van Bommel in 1717. In 1721, an accurate survey of the land was conducted. The mill on the Fonteyn Kill was discovered to be the property of Catharine Brett who claimed the land and sold a farm parcel that included the mill in 1754 to Johannes Swartwout. The land remained in Swartwout's hands until he died in 1805. From his heirs, the land came to be owned in 1812 by Matthew Westervelt and then Reuben Tanner in 1815. Tanner controlled the Fonteyn Kill land until 1844 when Caleb Morgan acquired the title to the space. In 1854, the land was transferred to Matthew Vassar, for whom "the presence of fresh water was an important factor in deciding the college's location". In 1861, the year of Vassar College's founding, the land through which the Fonteyn Kill runs came under the ownership of the college proper. A millstone from the Fonteyn Kill mill is preserved on the Vassar College campus in front of Rockefeller Hall.

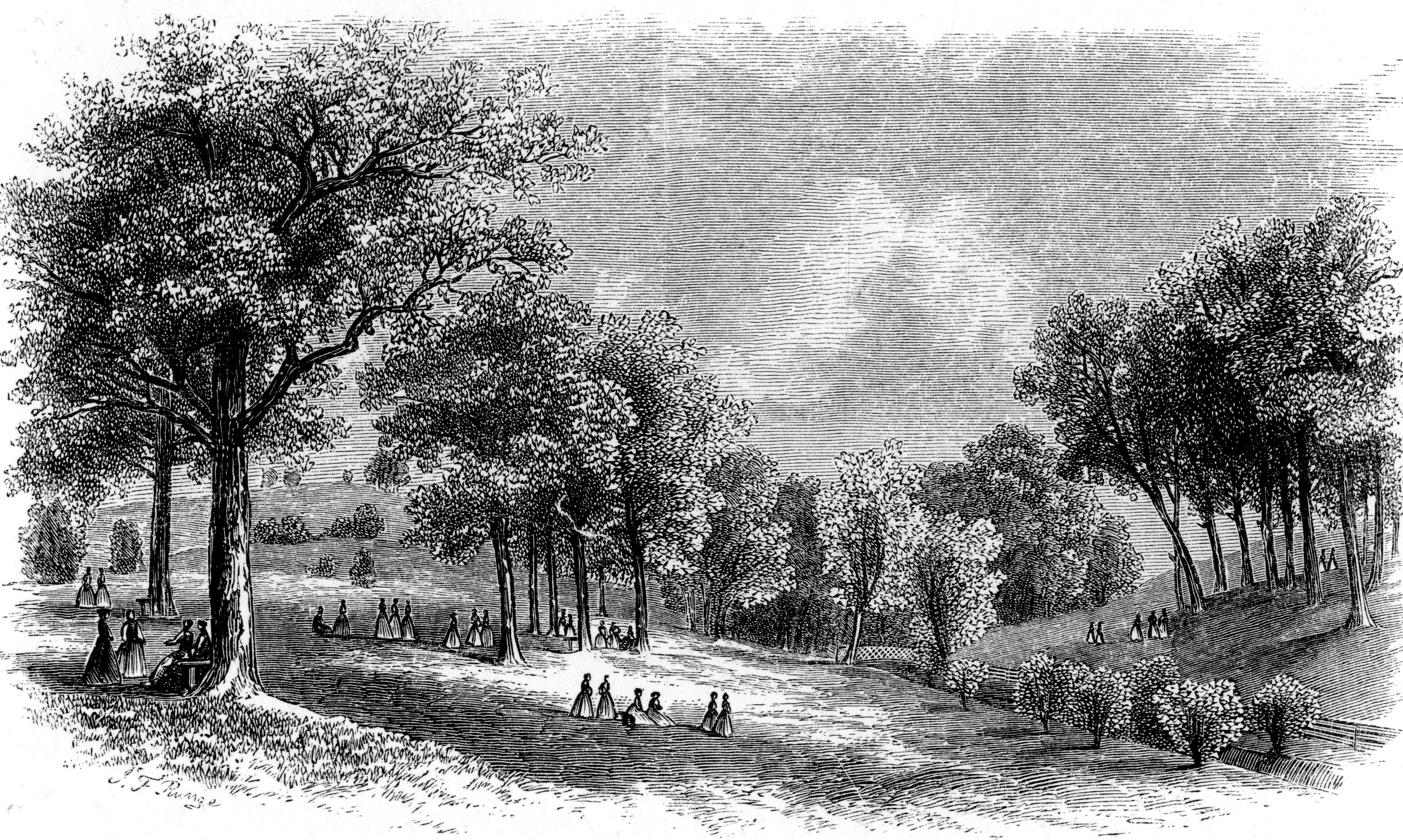
Vassar students in 1867 along the banks of the Fonteyn Kill

As Vassar developed, the area around the Fonteyn Kill was gradually built up. The old mill became the college's pumping station, capable of pumping 20,000 US gallons (76,000 L; 17,000 imp gal) each day. An ice house was also in place just south of the kill by 1867, along with a garden storehouse upstream of Vassar Lake on the stream's west side. During the winter, ice was cut from Vassar Lake and moved to the college's Main Building to keep the school's supply of food cold. Conflict occasionally arose between students who desired a smooth skating rink and staff at the college who were tasked with refrigerating Vassar's foodstuffs. In 1916, the college built its Shakespeare Garden, using seeds from many plants referenced in William Shakespeare's plays, just north of the stream. In the 1920s and 1930s, the Edith Roberts Environmental Laboratory was developed south of the kill, across from the Shakespeare Garden. The college constructed Olmsted Hall along the stream in 1972 and more recently, the Bridge for Laboratory Sciences which opened in 2016.

=== Etymology ===
The name "Fonteyn Kill" is derived from the Dutch Fonteyn Kil, literally meaning "Spring Brook". The stream's name is also sometimes written without a space as "Fonteynkill". The kill has also been known as the Fountain Kill, a hybrid name of English and Dutch origins. In the 1800s, the stream was also recorded as Mill Cove Brook. The stream's name was settled upon by the United States Board on Geographic Names on August 11, 2016, and it was assigned the Geographic Names Information System ID 2784952.

== Recreation ==
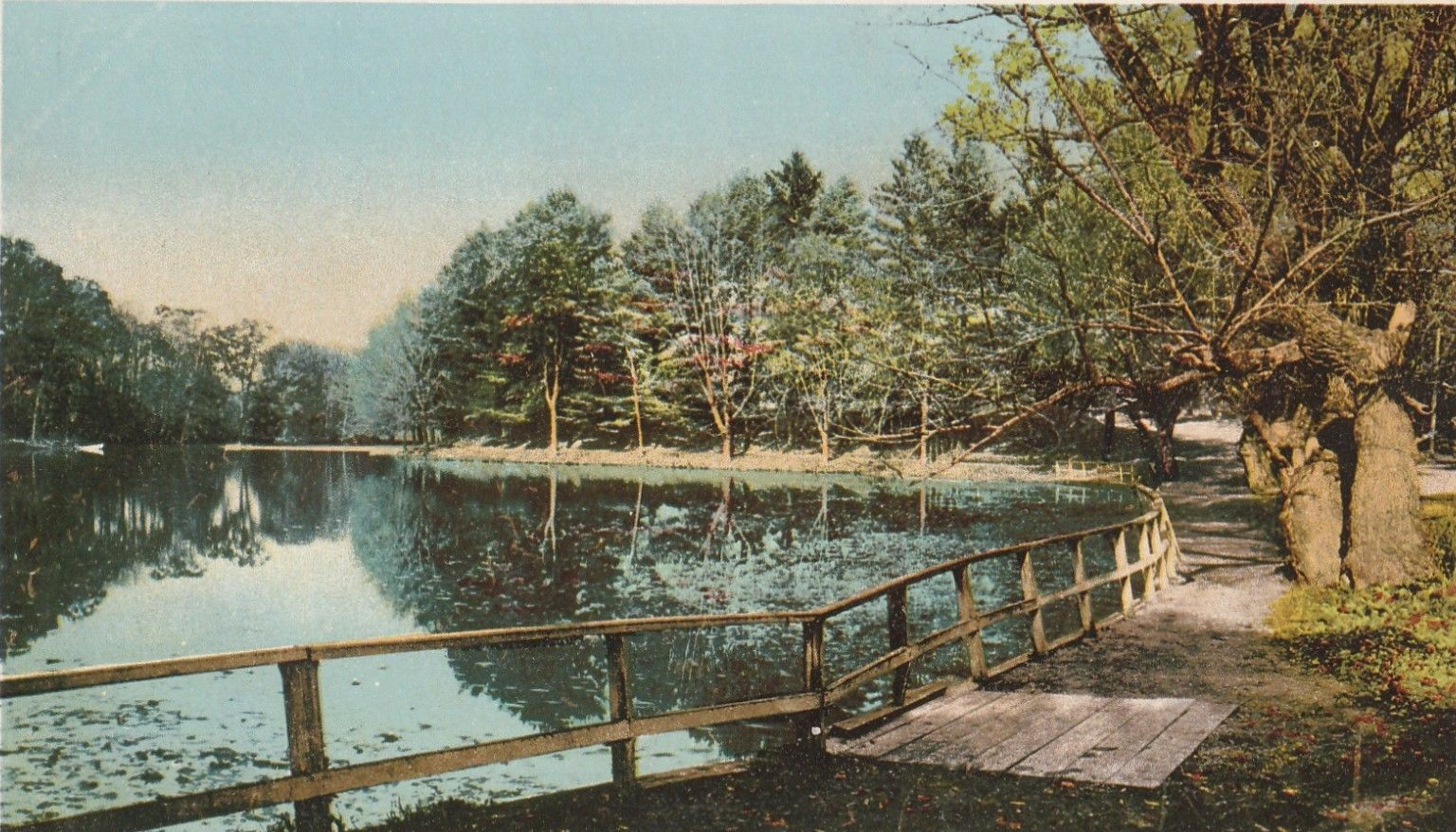
Vassar Lake circa 1904

The Fonteyn Kill and Vassar Lake have been used recreationally since Vassar College's establishment in the 1860s. Benson John Lossing recorded Vassar students in 1867 using Vassar Lake, then known as "Mill Cove Lake", for rowing and boating in the summer months; a simple dock was built to allow access to the water. In the winter, the lake froze over and students at the college would ice skate upon the surface. The shallowness of the lake became an obstacle to recreational use, and while it was suggested by Vassar's Miscellany News that the lake be dredged or removed entirely, neither of these options were employed and the lake is no longer a recreation site. By the 1920s, the Fonteyn Kill's source spring was being dammed in wintertime, flooding a nearby hollow to create an ice skating pond.

== See also ==
- List of rivers of New York
