= Bridge for Laboratory Sciences =

Laboratory and classroom building at Vassar College

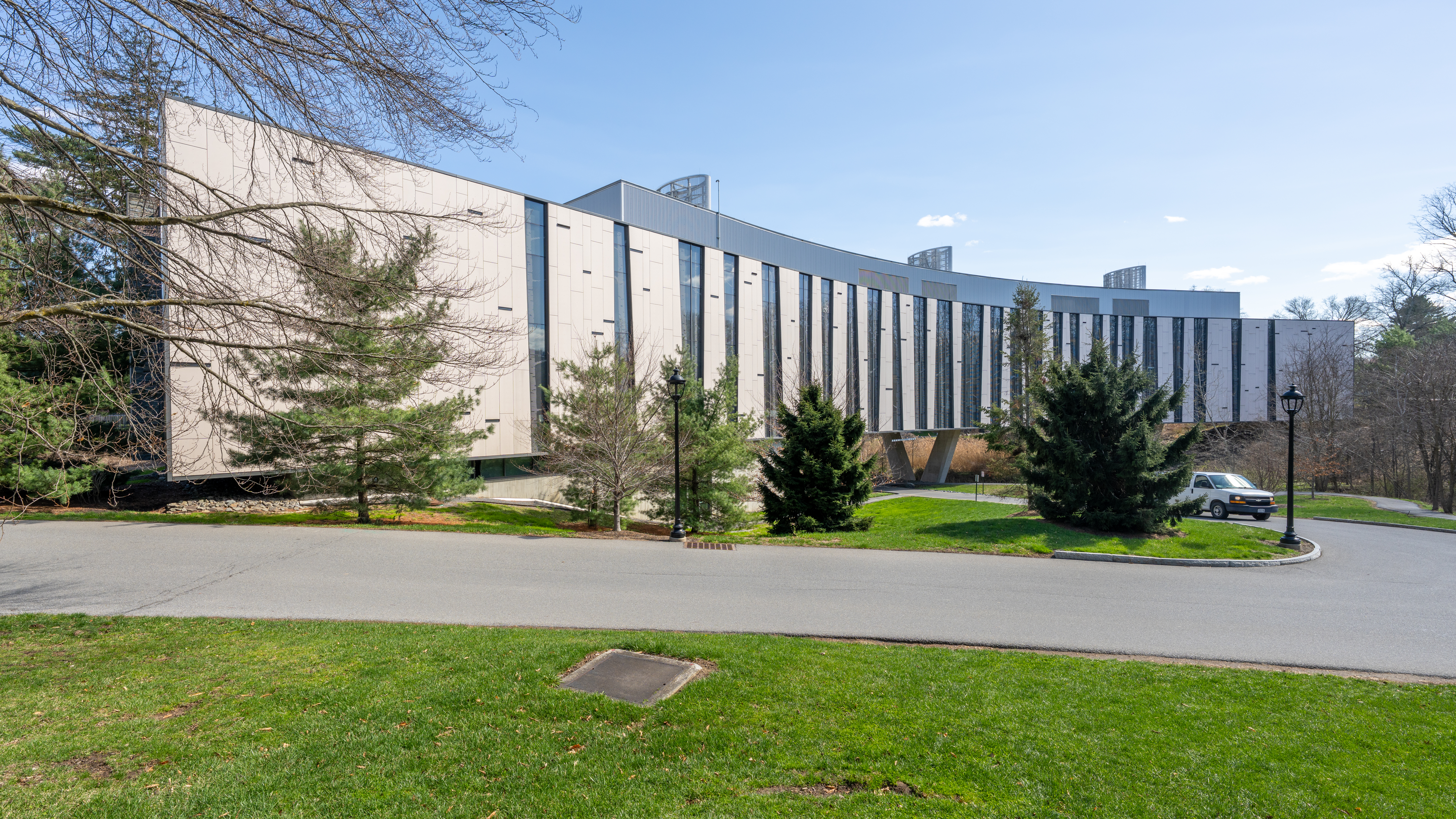
- The Bridge in April 2026
- Interactive map of the Bridge for Laboratory Sciences area

General information
- Type: Classroom, laboratory
- Location: Poughkeepsie, New York, United States
- Coordinates: 41.6842174°N 73.8963777°W
- Current tenants: Vassar College
- Opened: January 4, 2016
- Cost: $90 million (2013)
- Owner: Vassar College

Technical details
- Material: Steel, concrete, glass
- Floor count: Two
- Floor area: 80,000 square feet (7,400 m^{2})

Design and construction
- Architecture firm: Ennead Architects
- Main contractor: Daniel O'Connell and Sons

The Bridge for Laboratory Sciences (shortened to the Bridge) is a two-story laboratory and classroom building on the campus of Vassar College in the town of Poughkeepsie, New York. Designed by Ennead Architects, the 80,000-square-foot (7,400 m^{2}) structure curves 300 feet (91 m) across the Fonteyn Kill and connects to the renovated Olmsted Hall as part of the Integrated Science Center project.

== History ==
Vassar College in the town of Poughkeepsie, New York, began a project to completely renovate New England Building and Sanders Physics Building, partially renovate Olmsted Hall, and construct a new science center in 2011. In anticipation of the building's construction, Vassar's Environmental Research Institute, in conjunction with Cornell University's Cooperative Extension Dutchess County began to monitor the water quality of the Fonteyn Kill, a stream that runs through Vassar's campus over which the building was to be built. The Bridge for Laboratory Sciences (or the Bridge for short) cost $90 million in 2013. The main construction team was Daniel O'Connell and Sons with architectural design by Ennead Architects. The Bridge opened on January 4, 2016.

== Architecture and features ==
The Bridge stands two stories tall and spans 300 feet (91 m) across the Fonteyn Kill. On one end, it connects to the renovated Olmsted Hall, making up the "Integrated Science Center", a facility with a total combined area of 157,000 square feet (14,600 m^{2}). On its other end, the building lets out near Skinner Hall for Music. Before the building's construction, people seeking to cross the Fonteyn Kill needed to descend a flight of stairs to cross a footbridge but the Bridge for Laboratory Sciences is compliant with the Americans with Disabilities Act, making it a more accessible link across the kill. A variety of techniques are being used to prevent birds from colliding with the Bridge for Laboratory Sciences, including shading fins and an ultraviolet glaze applied to exterior windows visible to birds but not to humans.

The structure is gently curved and supported by two concrete piles anchored in the wetland beneath. Curved trusses are built at the top of the structure with steel extensions built downward to support the building's two floors. The top-down construction was undergone in part to protect the riparian ecosystem below the structure. It totals 80,000 square feet (7,400 m^{2}) in floor space, making it Vassar's largest academic building.

Facilities in the Bridge include a wet laboratory, a robotics laboratory, a phytotron, a scientific visualization laboratory, machine and electric shops, a herbarium, an exterior patio, and a coffee shop. Faculty offices and multidisciplinary classroom–lab spaces for biology, chemistry, earth science, and environmental sciences are also part of the structure.
