= Lake Switzerland =

- Location of Lake Switzerland within New York
- Location: Delaware County, New York
- Coordinates: 42°09′38″N 74°31′14″W
- Type: Reservoir
- Primary inflows: Vly Creek
- Primary outflows: Vly Creek
- Surface elevation: 1,568 feet (478 m)
- Settlements: Fleischmanns

Lake Switzerland is a small reservoir located east-northeast of Fleischmanns in Delaware County, New York. Vly Creek flows through Lake Switzerland.

== See also ==
- List of lakes in New York
