= Sandsea Kill =

- Location of the mouth within New York Sandsea Kill (the United States)

Location
- Country: United States
- State: New York

Physical characteristics
- Mouth: Mohawk River
  - location: Pattersonville
  - coordinates: 42°53′27″N 74°04′31″W
  - elevation: 238 ft (73 m)
- Basin size: 9.27 sq mi (24.0 km^{2})

The Sandsea Kill flows into the Mohawk River in Pattersonville, New York.
