= Roosevelt, Kentucky =

Unincorporated community in Kentucky, United States

Roosevelt
- Unincorporated community
- Location within the state of Kentucky Roosevelt (the United States)
- Coordinates: 37°24′22″N 83°22′1″W
- Country: United States
- State: Kentucky
- County: Breathitt
- Elevation: 787 ft (240 m)
- Time zone: UTC-6 (Central (CST))
  - Summer (DST): UTC-5 (CST)
- GNIS feature ID: 508967

Roosevelt is an unincorporated community and coal town in Breathitt County, Kentucky, United States.
