= Saw Kill =

Saw Kill or Sawkill may refer to:

- Saw Kill (Esopus Creek tributary), in New York
- Saw Kill (Hudson River tributary), in New York
- Sawkill, in Manhattan, New York
- Saw-kill mill Dutch Colonial sawmill on the East River, NYC
- Sawkill Creek, in Pennsylvania
