= Verf Kill =

Location
- Country: United States
- State: New York

Physical characteristics
- Mouth: Mohawk River
  - location: Pattersonville, New York
  - coordinates: 42°53′09″N 74°03′12″W
  - elevation: 238 ft (73 m)
- Basin size: 2.07 mi^{2} (5.4 km^{2})

Verf Kill flows into the Mohawk River near Pattersonville, New York.

Verf Kill is a name derived from Dutch meaning "paint creek".
