= Moccasin Kill =

- Location of the mouth within New York Moccasin Kill (the United States)

Location
- Country: United States
- State: New York

Physical characteristics
- Mouth: Mohawk River
  - location: Rotterdam Junction
  - coordinates: 42°51′11″N 74°01′27″W
  - elevation: 243 ft (74 m)
- Basin size: 1.53 mi^{2} (4.0 km^{2})

Moccasin Kill is a river in the state of New York. It flows into the Mohawk River by Rotterdam.
