= Casperkill =

Creek in New York, United States

Coordinates: 41°41′17″N 73°53′27″W

Casperkill Casper Creek
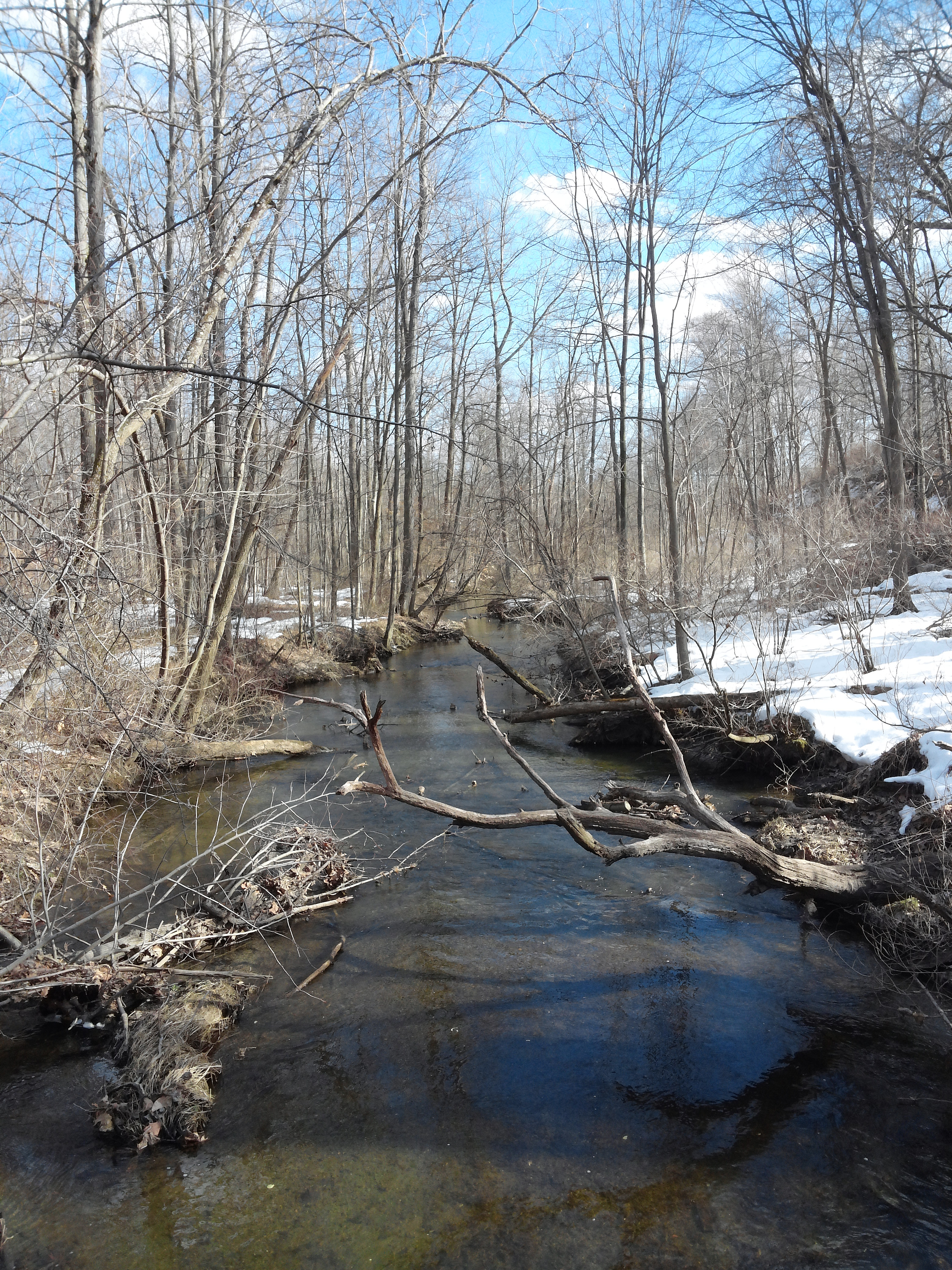
- The Casperkill in March 2014

Location
- Country: United States
- State: New York
- County: Dutchess
- Municipality: Town of Poughkeepsie, City of Poughkeepsie

Physical characteristics
- Source: Peach Hill
  - location: Dutchess County, New York, United States
- Length: 11.6 mi (18.7 km)
- Basin size: 12 mi^{2} (31 km^{2})
- Discharge
  - location: Hudson River, in the Town of Poughkeepsie

Basin features
- Tributaries
  - right: Fonteyn Kill

The Casperkill (also known as Jan Casper's Kill and shown on federal maps as Casper Creek) is a creek in both the town and city of Poughkeepsie, Dutchess County, New York. It flows 11.6 miles (18.7 km) from Peach Hill Park to the Hudson River. Combined with its only major tributary, the Fonteyn Kill, it forms a 12 mi^{2} (31 km^{2}) subwatershed. It lies entirely within the British royal grant of 1685 known as the Rombout Patent.

== Casperkill Assessment Project ==
Since the spring of 2006, the Casperkill Assessment Project —a partnership between the Vassar College Environmental Research Institute and local organizations and individuals – has been conducting research on the Casperkill creek and its watershed. Students and faculty at Vassar have studied the biology, geology, and chemistry of the creek, as well as the land use and policy decisions that affect it. The results of this research have been made available to the public through the Casperkill Assessment Document, which can be accessed below.

== Casperkill Watershed Alliance ==
Shortly after the Casperkill Assessment Project began, a citizens group - The Casperkill Watershed Alliance - was formed to promote awareness, foster appreciation, and work towards improving the ecological health of Casperkill watershed. The alliance is a partnership between the Vassar Environmental Research Institute, Cornell Cooperative Extension Dutchess County, Casperkill Watershed residents, civic officials, and other interested parties. The group meets monthly and organizes various community watershed events such as streamside plantings, storm drain marking projects, creek cleanups, natural lawn care workshops, rain barrel workshops, bike rides, and more. More information about the Casperkill Watershed Alliance can be found on the dutchesswatersheds.org website below.

== Casperkill Oral History Project ==
The Casperkill Oral History Project was initiated in the summer of 2010. Several Vassar students have been interviewing professors and local residents about the Casperkill creek and about the changes that have taken place within the surrounding watershed. Among the topics that the Casperkill Oral History team covers are: sites of historical interest; wildlife and ecological changes; residents' personal experiences living near the creek; and the history of human development and land use in the watershed, especially the transitions brought about by the expansion of IBM in Poughkeepsie in the mid-20th century. The information and memories collected by the team are made available to the public on a blog, which can be accessed below.

== See also ==
- List of rivers of New York
