= Bush Kill (New York) =

Location
- Country: United States
- State: New York

Physical characteristics
- Source: Vly Creek
  - location: Fleischmanns, Delaware County, New York
- 2nd source: Emory Brook
  - location: Fleischmanns, Delaware County, New York
- Mouth: Dry Brook
  - location: Arkville, New York, Delaware County, New York, United States
  - coordinates: 42°08′51″N 74°36′46″W
- Basin size: 47.2 mi^{2} (122 km^{2})

Basin features
- Tributaries
  - right: Little Red Kill, Red Kill

Bush Kill is a stream that flows into Dry Brook near Arkville, New York.
