= Plotter Kill Preserve =

River in the United States of America

Coordinates: 42.8297°N 74.0367°W

Plotter Kill Nature Reserve
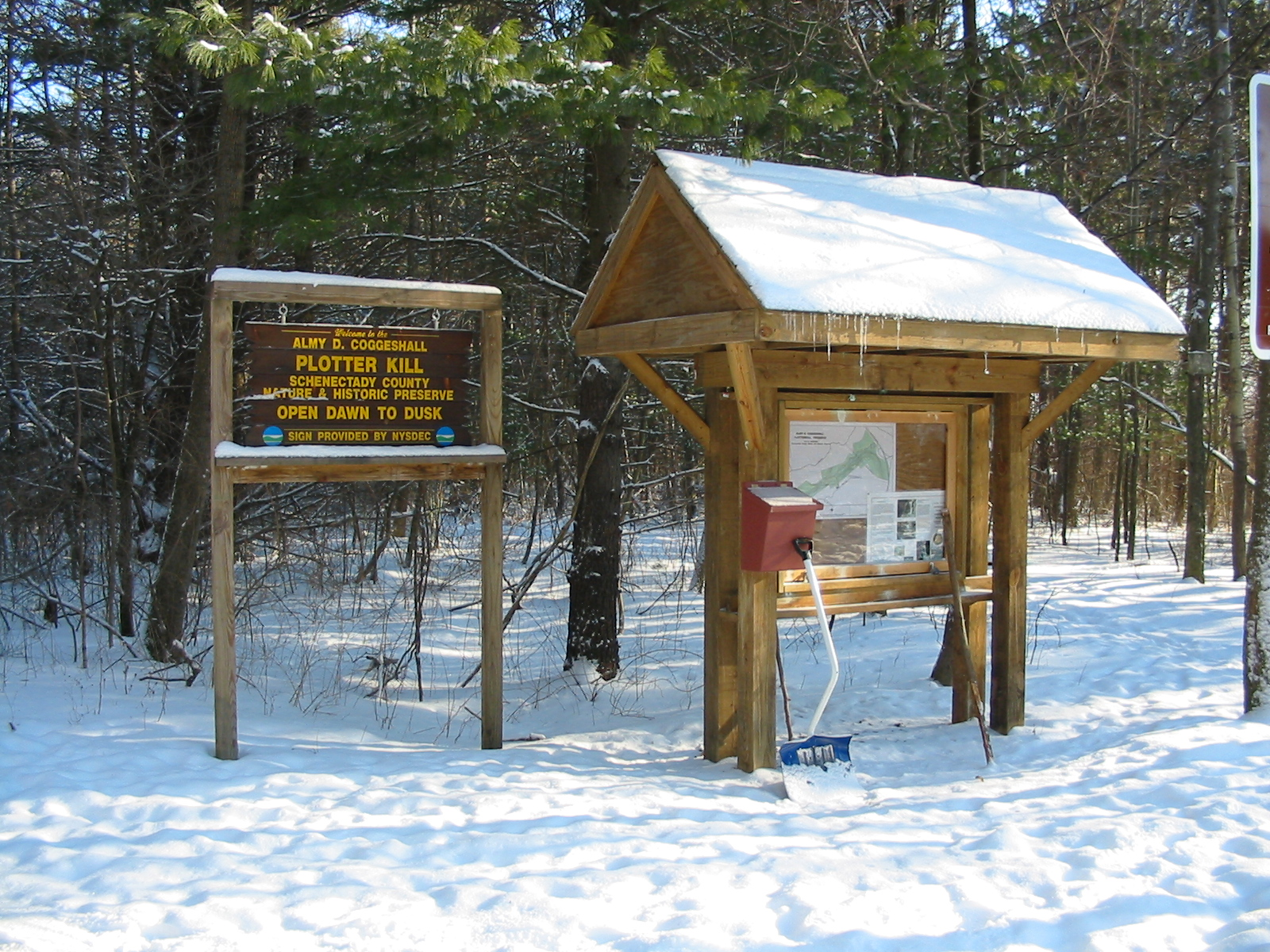
- Trail entrance sign
- Length: 3 miles circular (4 miles total)
- Location: Rotterdam (town), New York, USA
- Use: Recreation and Natural History
- Difficulty: Easy
- Season: All year round
- Sights: Variety of birds and other wildlife
- Hazards: High unstable cliff edges

The Almy D. Coggleshall Plotter Kill Preserve is a 632-acre (256 ha) nature reserve and hiking area located on Route 159 in the town of Rotterdam, Schenectady County, New York State.

== Etymology ==
Plotter Kill is most likely a corruption of "platte kill", which is also found in Ulster County. "Platte" is Dutch for "flat", and kill denotes stream or creek.

== General description ==
The preserve is named after Almy D. Coggleshall, who was central in creating the trail at Plotter Kill while a member of the Schenectady County Environmental Advisory Council. In 1990 the preserve was renamed in his honor. While the preserve is a forest containing a mixture of hardwood and conifers, its main feature is the Plotter Kill gorge. The gorge was cut by melt waters at the close of the ice ages approximately 10,000 years ago. The Plotter Kill is a tributary of the Mohawk River which runs for 3.5 miles (5.6 km) from Rynex Corner dropping 900 feet (270 m) to the river. There are three waterfalls in the preserve, the Upper, the Lower and the Rynex Creek Falls. The Upper has a 60-foot (18 m) drop while the Lower and Rynex Creek falls each have drops of 40 feet (12 m).

== Natural history ==
Many of the flat rock layers, exposed by water flow and erosion over the last 20,000 years, were originally formed during the Mohawkian age of the Ordovician period, approximately 450 million years ago. These layers appear rectangular, featuring orthogonal joint sets.

The Plotter Kill Preserve is ideal for nature study and is used by local schools and Boy Scout troops. The preserve is a mixture of native hardwoods and conifers including several species of pine, oak, birch and maple. Over 600 species of plants have been found in the area including: trilliums, violets, lilies, ferns and club mosses. There is also an abundance of both animal and bird life, with garter snakes, chipmunks and amphibians such as frogs and salamanders often seen. There are also an undocumented number of different species of toad stools and other varieties of fungi.

== In literature ==
The falls are mentioned in the journals of Samson Occam Mohegan (1723 - 1792). The entry for Wednesday 29 November 1786 reads "Some time after breakfast Mr Henry Fero and I went to see the falls and it is a grand sight, the power of God is to be seen here."

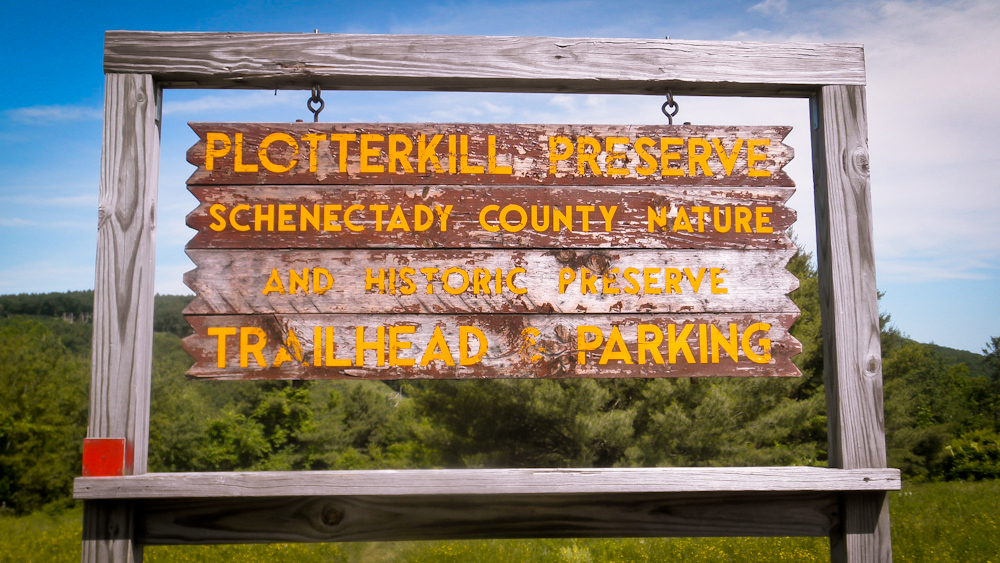
Sign in the Parking Lot of the Copland Road entrance.

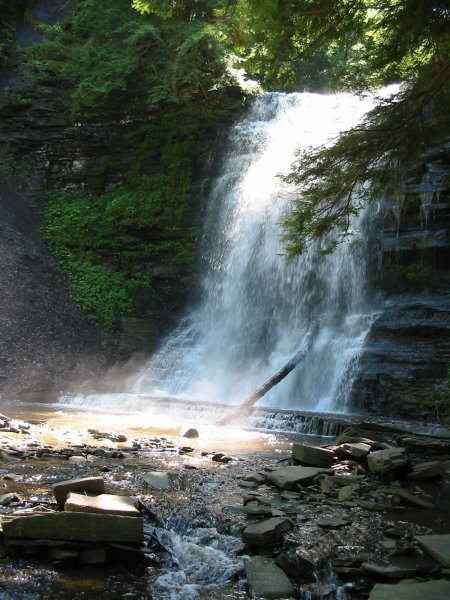
View of the Upper Falls

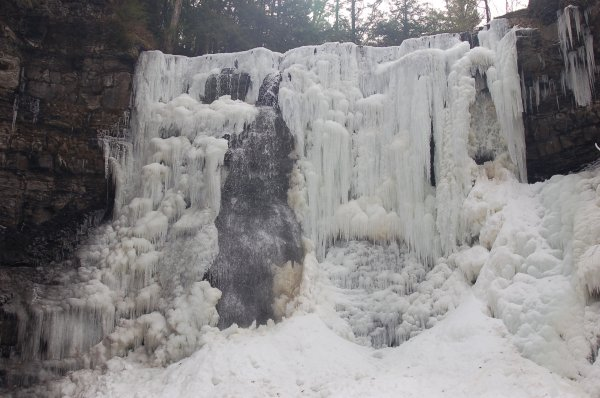
View of Upper Falls in winter

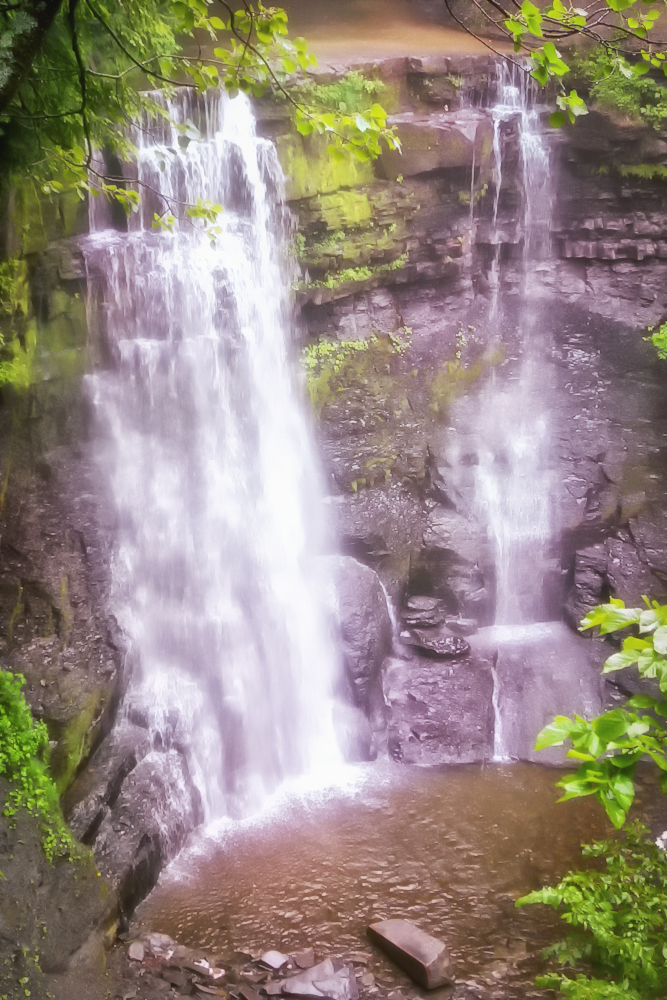
View of the Upper Falls from the Blue Trail

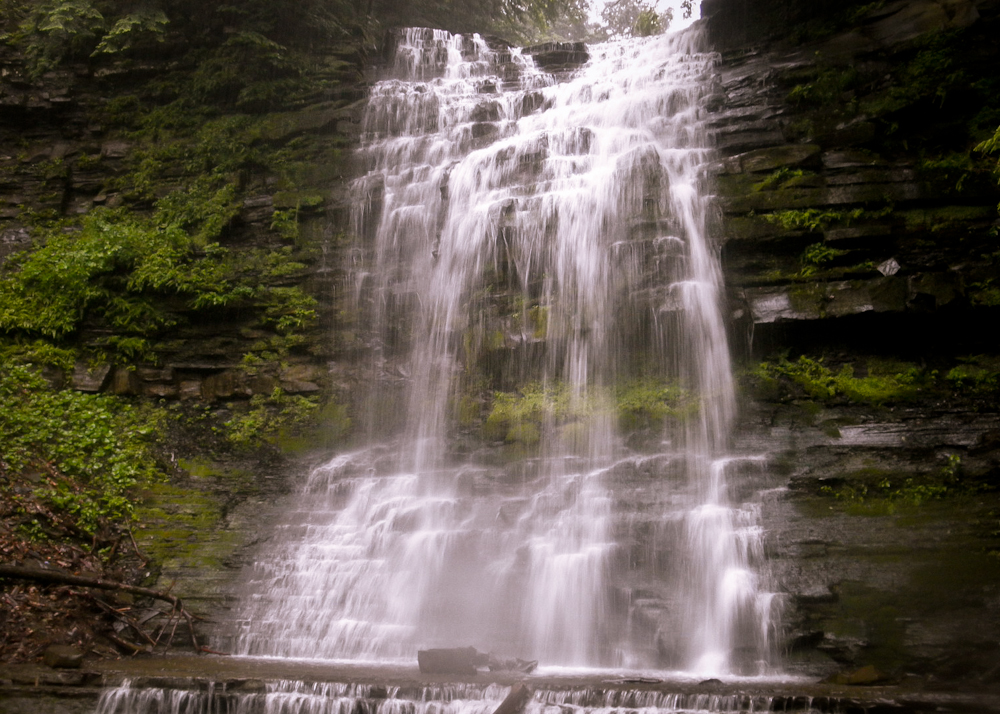
View of Second Fall during the Summer.

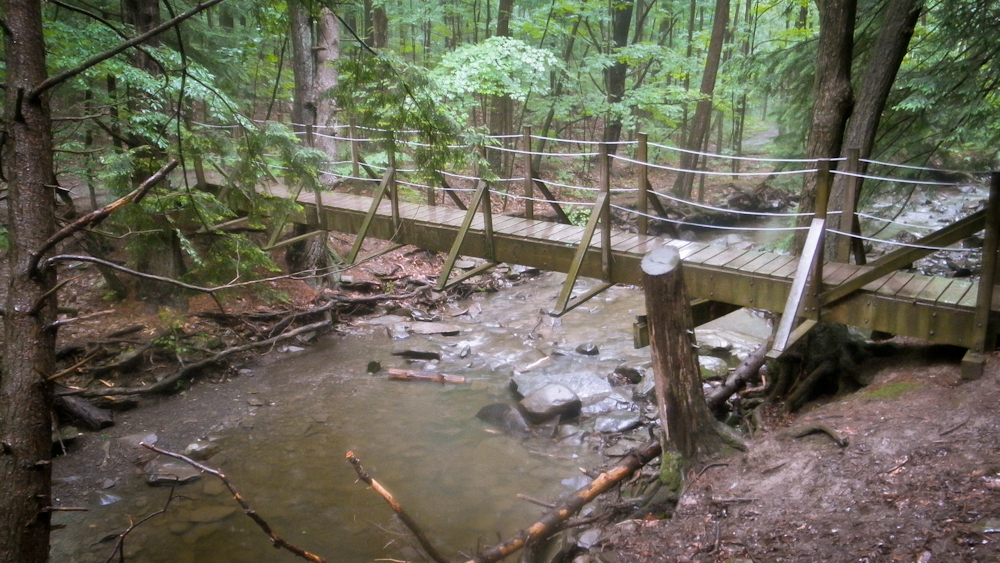
View of the renovated trail in 2010.

== The trailhead ==
The trailhead and general access is located on Mariaville Road (route 159). To reach it leave Interstate I890 at exit 2A (Campbell Road) and follow the signs for Rotterdam Square Mall. Opposite the mall entrance turn right on to Putnam Road and then turn right on reaching Route 159 after approximately 2 miles (3.2 km). The parking area for the preserve is located on the right approximately 2 miles (3.2 km) after turning onto Route 159.
