= Lisha Kill, New York =

Lisha Kill, New York Lisha's Kill
- Hamlet
- Etymology: from creek of same name and name of a local Native American who is buried along its banks
- Location within New York Location within the United States
- Coordinates: 42°45′25″N 73°52′45″W
- Country: United States
- State: New York
- Region: Capital District
- County: Albany
- Town: Colonie
- Settled: 1790s
- Time zone: UTC-5 (EST)
  - Summer (DST): UTC-4 (EDT)
- ZIP Code: 12304 (Schenectady)
- Area code: 518

Lisha Kill is a hamlet in the town of Colonie, Albany County, New York, United States. Lisha Kill lies on New York Route 5 (Central Avenue) in the western section of the town. The hamlet received its name from the creek of the same name, Lisha Kill, kill being Dutch for creek or stream. The stream is also referred to as Lisha's Kill and received its name from a local legend about a Native American woman who is buried along its banks.

== History ==
Lisha Kill's history is intimately tied to the creek of the same name. Originally called Lysiens Kill, local legend says Lisha's Kill is named for a Native American woman who was buried along its banks. Some of the earliest settlers were of the Lansing family, a family long associated with nearby Albany, Cohoes, and Lansingburgh; Jacob Lansing is considered the first to have settled in the area and John V.A. Lansing, another early settler, arrived in 1792. His house still stands and has been on the National Register of Historic Places since 1985. Henry O. Lansing owned a saw mill powered by water or steam from the Lisha Kill in 1875. Several Lansings in the late 19th century were deacons, elders, and officers of the (Dutch) Reformed Church of Lisha's Kill. Colonel Jon T. A. Lansing and his four sons owned four farms consisting of 160 acres (0.65 km^{2}) bounded by Central Avenue, and Lisha Kill, Lansing and Consaul roads, the Town of Colonie Golf Course is built on over half of this acreage.

The Albany and Schenectady Turnpike, built in 1799, connecting those two cities ran through the middle of Lisha Kill and had a toll-gate here. The hamlet quickly became thickly settled and well developed in the 19th century. There was a blacksmithy, hotel, stores, a tavern run by Josiah Stanford (father of California Governor Leland Stanford); and a post office that was established in 1830. Two school houses served the local children, Watervliet School House (WSH) 7 (to the east on Consaul Road); and WSH 8 (in Stanford Heights). Today, the children of Lisha Kill attend Veeder Elementary School and Lisha Kill Middle School (since 1959) east of the hamlet and then Colonie High as part of the South Colonie Central School District.

The residents of Lisha Kill for the most part were of Dutch ancestry and belonged to the Dutch Reformed Church, they worshiped at the Niskayuna Reformed Church until 1852 when they petitioned the Classis of Schenectady for their own church. This was granted and the Dutch Reformed Church of Lisha's Kill began meeting in Watervliet School 8 until 1854 when a new church building was dedicated. The church still is in use as the second oldest Reformed Church in Colonie.

== Geography ==
Lisha Kill is centered along Central Avenue (NY Route 5) in the western part of Colonie, between the cities of Albany and Schenectady. Lisha Kill is also the name of a creek that runs perpendicular to Central Avenue.
