= Compaanen Kill =

Location
- Country: United States
- State: New York

Physical characteristics
- Mouth: Mohawk River
  - location: Hoffmans, New York
  - coordinates: 42°54′24″N 74°06′06″W
  - elevation: 238 ft (73 m)
- Basin size: .15 mi^{2} (0.39 km^{2})

Compaanen Kill flows into the Mohawk River in Hoffmans, New York.
