= Van Buren Lake =

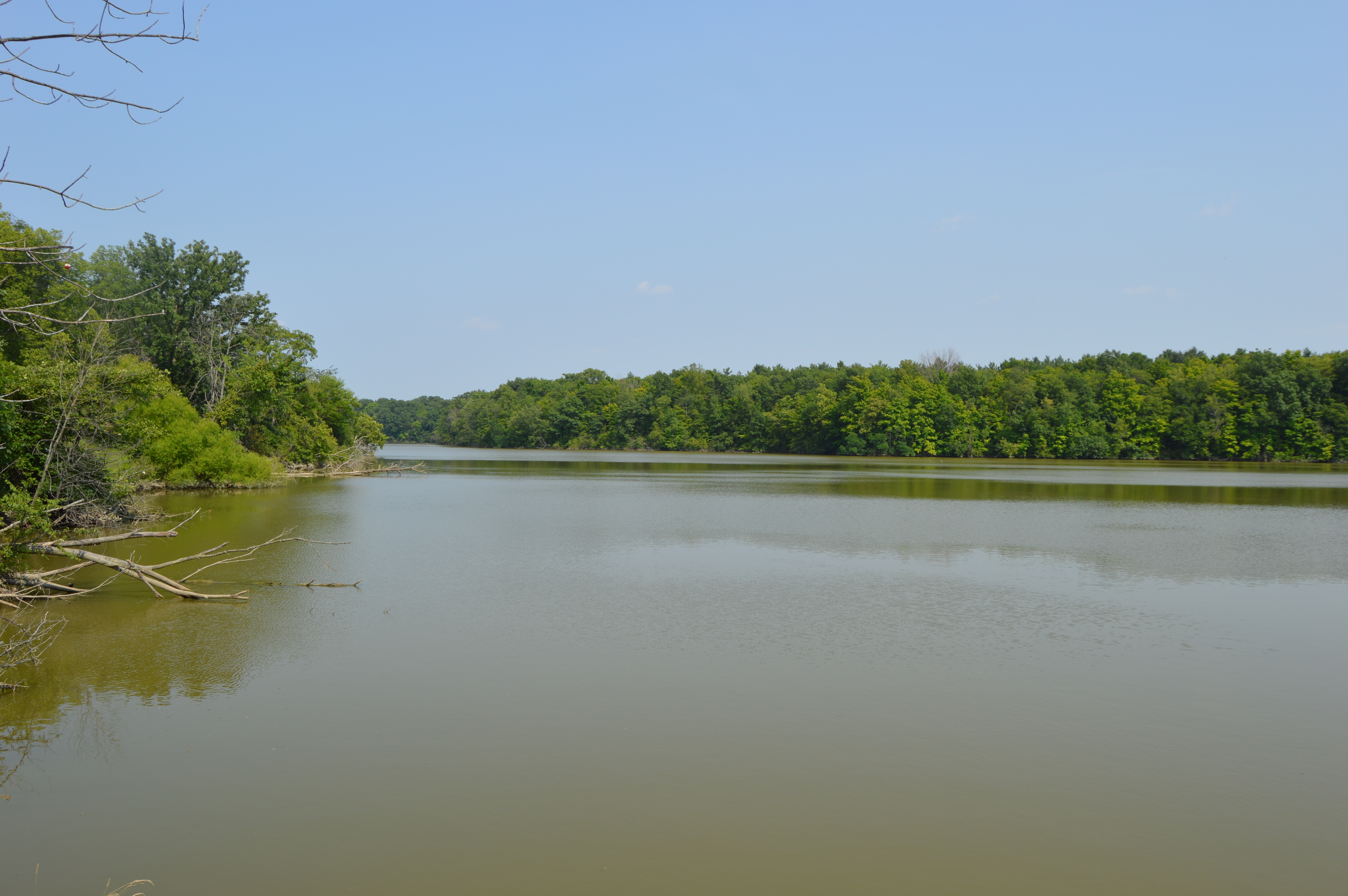

- Location within Ohio
- Location: Hancock County, Ohio
- Coordinates: 41°08′01″N 83°38′18″W
- Type: lake
- Basin countries: United States
- Surface area: 53 acres (21 ha)
- Surface elevation: 750 ft (230 m)

Van Buren Lake was a lake next to the village of Van Buren in Hancock County, Ohio, in the United States. The lake was formed by a dam on Rocky Ford Creek, which was built in 1939, but was removed in 2025.

Van Buren Lake was named after Martin Van Buren, 8th President of the United States.

== See also ==
- List of lakes in Ohio
