= Vanderbilt, Nevada =

- Ghost town
- Location within the state of Nevada Vanderbilt (the United States)
- Coordinates: 39°25′29″N 115°58′42″W
- Country: United States
- State: Nevada
- County: Eureka
- Elevation: 7,372 ft (2,247 m)
- Time zone: UTC-8 (Pacific (PST))
  - Summer (DST): UTC-7 (PDT)

Vanderbilt is a ghost town in Eureka County, in the western state of Nevada, in the United States.

== History ==
In 1870, Vanderbilt had 150 inhabitants, two boarding houses and two saloons, although 300 miners were employed in the mining district in those times. In August 1871, the Post Office opened. When Eureka had begun to boom, many people of Vanderbilt move there. In 1872 a disaster has occurred in Vanderbilt: a fire destroyed the mill. In 1880, only 25 people lived in Vanderbilt, in 1885 the post office was closed. The Post Office was reopened as Geddes in March 1882 though it closed in June 1885. The few active mines had closed by 1887.

Now, the only vestiges of the town are mill ruins. Because the road to Vanderbilt is very treacherous, it is dangerous to attempt reaching the town.
