= Wright, New York =

- Town
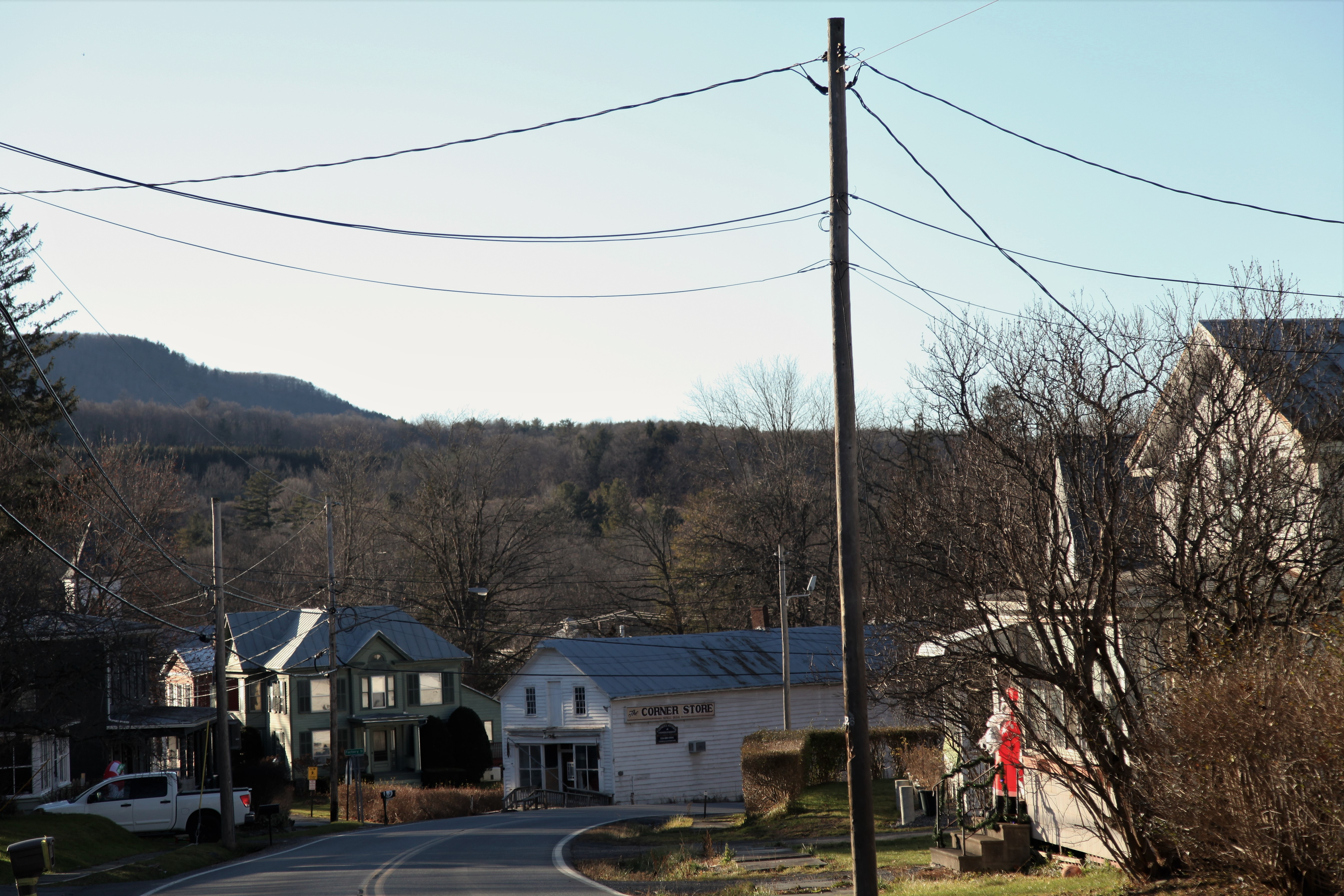

- Location in Schoharie County and the state of New York.
- Coordinates: 42°40′23″N 74°12′22″W
- Country: United States
- State: New York
- County: Schoharie

Area
  - Total: 28.72 sq mi (74.38 km^{2})
  - Land: 28.64 sq mi (74.17 km^{2})
  - Water: 0.081 sq mi (0.21 km^{2})
- Elevation: 950 ft (290 m)

Population (2020)
  - Total: 1,516
- Time zone: UTC-5 (Eastern (EST))
  - Summer (DST): UTC-4 (EDT)
- FIPS code: 36-83195
- GNIS feature ID: 0979658
- Website: www4.schohariecounty-ny.gov/government/town-of-wright/

Wright is a town in Schoharie County, New York, United States. The population was 1,516 at the 2020 census. The town was named after governor Silas Wright.

The Town of Wright is on the county's northeastern corner and is west of Albany.

== History ==
The town started as a settlement in 1735 by the Jacob Becker family. The stone house that stands today was built by Johannus Becker in 1772. The house was defended from an attack by agroup of Tories and Native Americans in July 26, 1782.

== Geography ==
According to the United States Census Bureau, the town has a total area of 28.7 square miles (74 km^{2}), of which 28.6 square miles (74 km^{2}) is land and 0.1 square miles (0.26 km^{2}) (0.24%) is water.

The northern town line is the border of Schenectady County and the eastern town boundary is the border of Albany County. The western town line is partly defined by the Louse Kill, a tributary of the Fox Creek.

New York State Route 146 (NY 146) intersects New York State Route 443 (NY 443), both east–west highways near Gallupville in Wright. The intersection is the western terminus of NY 146.

== Demographics ==
Historical population
Census	Pop.	Note	%±
1850	1,716		—
1860	1,717		0.1%
1870	1,525		−11.2%
1880	1,591		4.3%
1890	1,295		−18.6%
1900	1,155		−10.8%
1910	963		−16.6%
1920	833		−13.5%
1930	755		−9.4%
1940	786		4.1%
1950	903		14.9%
1960	910		0.8%
1970	1,068		17.4%
1980	1,302		21.9%
1990	1,385		6.4%
2000	1,547		11.7%
2010	1,539		−0.5%
2020	1,516		−1.5%
U.S. Decennial Census

As of the census of 2000, there were 1,547 people, 569 households, and 433 families residing in the town. The population density was 54.0 inhabitants per square mile (20.8/km^{2}). There were 622 housing units at an average density of 21.7 per square mile (8.4/km^{2}). The racial makeup of the town was 98.64% White, 0.39% African American, 0.26% Native American, 0.19% Asian, 0.06% from other races, and 0.45% from two or more races. Hispanic or Latino of any race were 0.65% of the population.

There were 569 households, out of which 36.2% had children under the age of 18 living with them, 63.8% were married couples living together, 6.9% had a female householder with no husband present, and 23.9% were non-families. 18.8% of all households were made up of individuals, and 7.2% had someone living alone who was 65 years of age or older. The average household size was 2.72 and the average family size was 3.07.

In the town, the population was spread out, with 26.3% under the age of 18, 6.4% from 18 to 24, 31.5% from 25 to 44, 23.8% from 45 to 64, and 12.0% who were 65 years of age or older. The median age was 38 years. For every 100 females, there were 100.9 males. For every 100 females age 18 and over, there were 102.1 males.

The median income for a household in the town was $42,898, and the median income for a family was $46,667. Males had a median income of $32,464 versus $27,171 for females. The per capita income for the town was $19,711. About 5.5% of families and 8.9% of the population were below the poverty line, including 15.3% of those under age 18 and 6.4% of those age 65 or over.

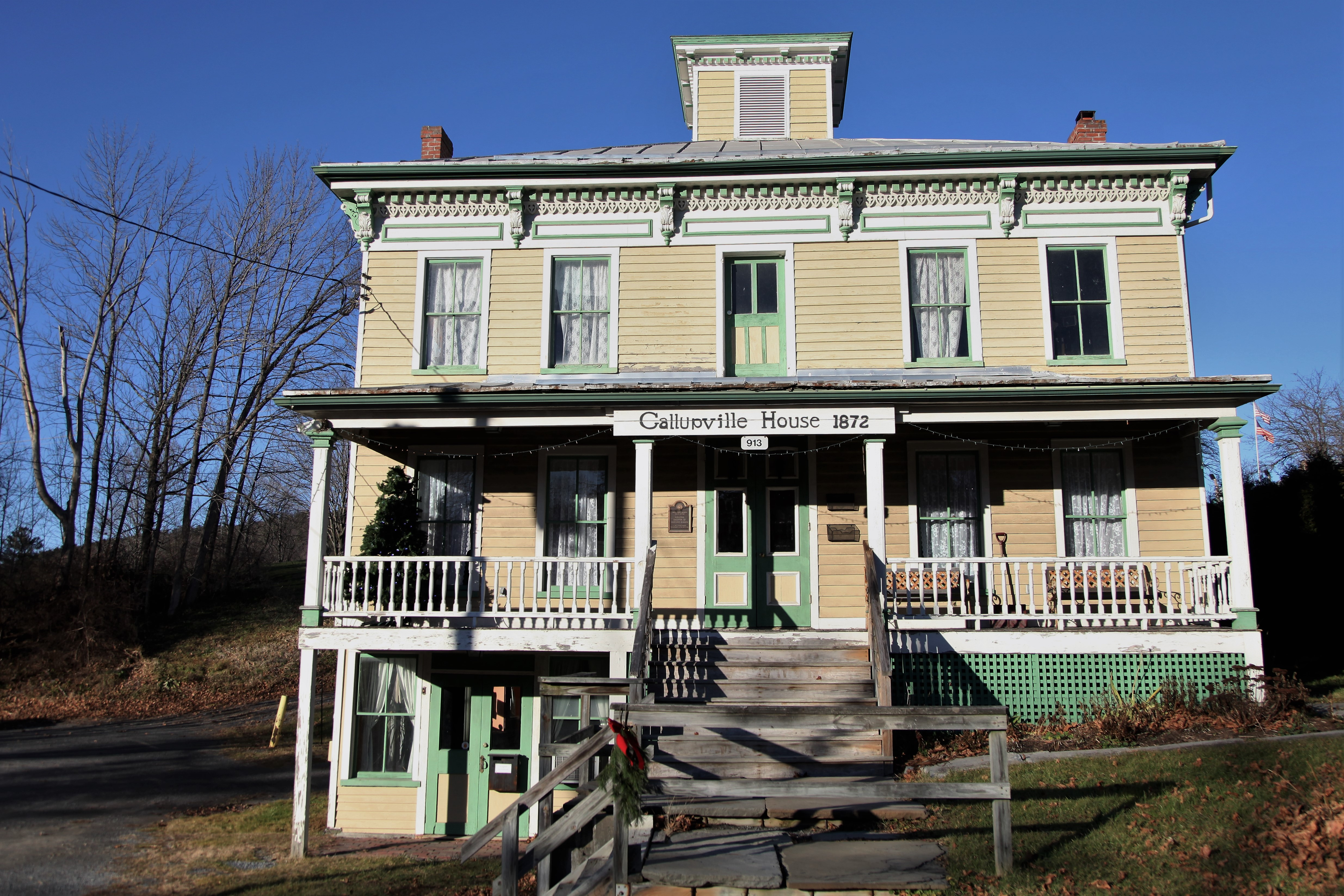
The Gallupville House on New York State Route 443 in an eponymous hamlet.

== Communities and locations in Wright ==
- Echo Pond – A small lake in the northeastern corner of Wright.
- Fox Creek – A stream flowing out the eastern border of the town.
- Gallupville – A hamlet in the southwestern part of the town by the intersection of NY 146 and NY 443. It is also the location of the first settlement in the town. The Gallupville Evangelical Lutheran Church, Gallupville Methodist Church, and Gallupville House are listed on the National Register of Historic Places.
- Shutter Corners – A hamlet northwest of Gallupville on NY 443. Shutter Corners is located along the Fox Creek and contains a recognized cave known as the Schoharie Cavern, at Shutter Corners.
