= Brown's station (Ulster and Delaware Railroad) =

Coordinates: 41°56′56″N 74°12′42″W

Brown's
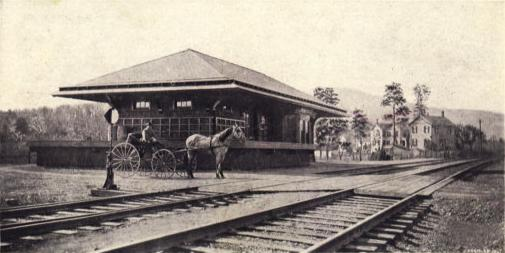
- The station at Brown's, as depicted in a postcard

General information
- Location: Brown's Station, Ulster County. New York
- Tracks: 1

History
- Closed: June 8, 1913
Location

Brown's Station, MP 15.8, was one of the pre-fabricated stations that was built for the Ulster and Delaware Railroad in the early 1900s, this one being constructed in 1900: the same year the railroad reached Oneonta. This was one of the stations that was located in the Ashokan Valley, and served the small town of Brown's Station, New York, which is now underwater.

This station was moved twice. The first time it was moved, it went to Ashokan after its original town was sunk during the making of the Ashokan Reservoir. But, before that, it was a major stop for concrete and other materials used to construct the Ashokan Reservoir. There was also a siding for the McArthur Brothers Company. But after the construction of the reservoir, the station was moved to Ashokan.

It went through an average life of business until the end of passenger service on the U&D on March 31, 1954, when it was abandoned. It was then moved to Woodstock in the 1970s, and was initially in poor condition. It was later restored, and had a tower and a portico added.
