= Brown's Station, New York =

Village in United States of America

Coordinates: 41°56′49″N 74°12′15″W

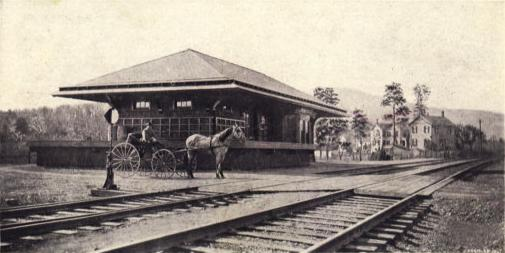
The former U&D depot in Brown's Station

Brown's Station was a hamlet in the Esopus Valley of southeastern Ulster County, New York, United States. It was submerged by the waters of the Ashokan Reservoir, an artificial lake built between 1906 and 1915 to supply fresh water to New York City.

The easternmost hamlet in the town of Olive, Brown's Station was named for Alfred Brown, a prominent local farmer. In the village and its environs, there were farms, boarding houses, shops, and a telegraph office. Two streams flowed through the village: the Esopus Creek and the Beaverkill Creek, which merged, at the downhill end of the village, retaining the name, Esopus Creek. Brown's Station was a popular spot, especially for vacationers from New York City, who would come to swim in the creeks, and to enjoy rafting (using rubber inner tubes), boating, and fishing.

The village was served by the Ulster and Delaware Railroad; the railroad depot called Brown's Station, which lent the hamlet its name, was one of the busiest passenger and freight depots in the Esopus Valley. The depot at Brown's Station was an instrument of its own demise; shipments of cement were transported there for use in the construction of the Ashokan Reservoir.

Having already impounded part of the nearby Croton River and most of its tributaries, agents of the City of New York surveyed a number of places to build another reservoir. Eventually, they decided to flood the Esopus Valley. They started building the dam in 1906, using Rosendale cement, a high-quality hydraulic cement produced at Rosendale in the central part of Ulster County. When the dam was completed in 1912, the sluice was closed and water flooded the valley, a process which was completed in 1915. The buildings of Brown's Station had either been moved or abandoned.

Although Brown Station was flooded, some homes retained the town as their address. In the 1950s, letters to Paula Cohen, a nearby resident, were still addressed to Brown Station.

== See also ==
Brodhead's Bridge Railroad Station
