= Switz Kill =

Location
- Country: United States
- State: New York

Physical characteristics
- Mouth: Fox Creek
  - location: Berne, New York, United States
  - coordinates: 42°37′13″N 74°09′45″W
- Basin size: 29.3 mi^{2} (76 km^{2})

Switz Kill converges with Fox Creek in Berne, New York.

The stream was named for the fact a large share of the early settlers were Swiss.
