= Red Kill (Bush Kill tributary) =

Location
- Country: United States
- State: New York

Physical characteristics
- Source
  - location: Delaware County, New York
- Mouth: Bush Kill
  - location: Fleischmanns, New York, Delaware County, New York, United States
  - coordinates: 42°09′34″N 74°33′21″W
- Basin size: 8.71 mi^{2} (22.6 km^{2})

Red Kill flows into Bush Kill west of Fleischmanns, New York.
