= Lisha Kill (Mohawk River tributary) =

- Location of the mouth of Lisha Kill Lisha Kill (Mohawk River tributary) (the United States)

Location
- Country: United States
- State: New York

Physical characteristics
- Mouth: Mohawk River
  - location: Niskayuna, New York
  - coordinates: 42°46′48″N 73°49′45″W
  - elevation: 190 ft (58 m)
- Basin size: 19.1 sq mi (49 km^{2})

Lisha Kill flows through Lisha Kill, New York before emptying into the Mohawk River in Niskayuna, New York. The stream is also referred to as Lisha's Kill and received its name from a local legend about a Native American woman who is buried along its banks.
