= Vandyke, Virginia =

Unincorporated community in Virginia, United States

Coordinates: 37°08′31″N 81°55′21″W

Vandyke is an unincorporated community in Buchanan County, Virginia, United States.

== History ==
A post office was established at Vandyke in 1909, and remained in operation until it was discontinued in 1951. Henry Vandyke was an early postmaster.
