= Japanese rose =

Japanese rose is a common name for several plants and may refer to:

- Kerria japonica, native to China, Japan, and Korea
- Rosa multiflora
- Rosa rugosa
