= Dwaarkill, New York =

Coordinates: 41°38′55″N 074°15′50″W

Dwaarkill (also known as Dwaars Kill, Dwaar's Kill, or Dwaar Kill) is a populated place in Ulster County, New York, United States.

== See also ==
- Crawford, New York
