= Little Red Kill =

Location
- Country: United States
- State: New York

Physical characteristics
- Source
  - location: Delaware County, New York
- Mouth: Bush Kill
  - location: Fleischmanns, New York, Delaware County, New York, United States
  - coordinates: 42°09′21″N 74°31′58″W

Little Red Kill is a stream that flows into Bush Kill at Fleischmanns, New York.
