= Batavia Kill (East Branch Delaware River tributary) =

Location
- Country: United States
- State: New York

Physical characteristics
- Source
  - location: Delaware County, New York
- Mouth: East Branch Delaware River
  - location: Kelly Corners, New York, Delaware County, New York, United States
  - coordinates: 42°10′59″N 74°36′05″W
- Basin size: 19.2 mi^{2} (50 km^{2})

Batavia Kill flows into the East Branch Delaware River by Kelly Corners, New York.
