= Beaverkill Creek =

Coordinates: 41.950°N 74.211°W

The Beaverkill Creek was a former tributary of the Esopus Creek in the Catskill Mountains of New York. It began in West Hurley, New York, and flowed through the towns of Glenford, Olive Branch and Ashton until it joined the Esopus Creek at Brown's Station, New York. However, the creek was completely submerged when the Ashokan Reservoir was constructed, and its former path is under the east basin. The confluence of the Beaverkill and the Esopus is under the Olivebridge Dam.

== See also ==
- List of rivers of New York
