= JMA =

JMA may refer to:

- Jaish al-Muhajireen wal-Ansar, Islamist jihadist group that fought in the Syrian Civil War
- Japan Medical Association, professional association of licensed physicians in Japan
- Japan Meteorological Agency, Japanese government agency that researches natural phenomena
- JMA Wireless, an American networking hardware company
- JMA Wireless Dome, a stadium used by Syracuse University football and basketball teams
- The John More Association, an American family association
- Josie Music Awards, American award organization
