= Jump Brook =

Location
- Country: United States
- State: New York

Physical characteristics
- Mouth: Bear Kill
  - location: Grand Gorge, New York, United States
  - coordinates: 42°22′06″N 74°30′13″W
- Basin size: 3.17 mi^{2} (8.2 km^{2})

Jump Brook is a river that converges with Bear Kill by Grand Gorge, New York.
