= John More Association =

American family association formed in 1890

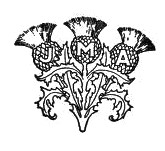
- Emblem of the John More Association
- Formation: 1890; 136 years ago
- Type: Family association
- Website: www.johnmore.com

The John More Association (JMA) is a family association for descendants of John and Betty Taylor More.

The association was first formed when a group of the couple's descendants wanted to build a memorial marking the grave of John and Betty More in Roxbury, New York. After the monument was built and dedicated in 1890, the gathered descendants decided to form a more permanent organization to hold reunions and care for family sites.

The number of descendants of John and Betty More grew from several hundred living people when the first reunion was held to tens of thousands. The association has continued holding reunions in Roxbury every five years since 1890, with the exception of 1945 and 2020.

== History ==
=== John and Betty Taylor More ===
John and Betty Taylor More emigrated from Inverness-shire, Scotland to the Thirteen Colonies in 1772. After arriving in New York City, they traveled north and settled near what is now Hobart, New York, living in a small cabin.

Around 1777, the family was displaced due to raids led by Joseph Brant. Brant was friends with More and warned him of the raid in advance, allowing the family to escape in a four-day journey to safety in Catskill. In the years that followed, John More served in the Tryon County militia during the American Revolution.

After living in Catskill for a number of years, the More family returned to present-day Delaware County in 1786. While traveling, More met a man headed in the same direction and traded his land claim near Hobart for one in the town of Roxbury. The family settled in the area and John More opened a tavern in the new family home. The tavern was at a crossroads and made a convenient stopping point, bringing John and Betty success and a reliable income. The hamlet that formed around their tavern was known as Moresville for many decades, before being renamed Grand Gorge.

John and Betty More had eight children; John T., Robert, Alexander, Jonas, Jean, James, David, and Edward More.

John More went on to serve as a magistrate and the first postmaster for the developing community. Betty Taylor More died in 1823, and John More moved to his son Edward's home near the hamlet of Roxbury. On New Year's Day in 1840, John More died at the age of 94.

=== The John More Association ===
In 1889, a group of Alexander Taylor More's descendants gathered in Margaretville, New York, and were inspired to try to hold a larger family reunion with all eight branches of John and Betty Taylor More's descendants. Soon after, a planning committee was organized and a circular letter was sent to all known descendants proposing that they gather for a large family reunion and build a monument marking the graves of their shared ancestors.

The first person to respond to the letter was railroad magnate Jay Gould; a More descendant on his mother's side. Gould committed money towards the monument and agreed to serve on the planning committee. The final monument was made out of Scottish and Vermont granite, and in spite of delays caused by a strike on the New York Central and Hudson River Railroads it arrived in Roxbury one week before the planned reunion.

The inaugural reunion was held over three days in early September. A large tent was set up for festivities near the Roxbury cemetery, and events included an unveiling of the monument, music performances, speeches, a social reception, and sightseeing. On the first evening of the reunion, some of the attendees came together to form The Association of the Descendents of John and Betty Taylor More to organize future reunions, care for the monument and burial places, and publish a history of the family.

David Fellows More became the first secretary of the family association, and oversaw the creation of The Historical Journal of the More Family in April 1892. The following year, he wrote a History of the More Family and an Account of Their First Reunion in 1890.

During the third reunion in 1900, the group's name was shortened to The John More Association. Regional chapters of the JMA were first formed in the early 1900s, with New York City, Central (Chicago), and Catskill Mountain Chapters established. The Catskill Mountain Chapter remained active until 1913, the New York City Chapter until 1916, and the Central Chapter until 1926.

The 1915 family reunion featured an historical pagaent of the lives of John and Betty More to commemorate the 25th anniversary of the first reunion. The filmed performance featured equestrians, hundreds of cast members, choreographed dance interludes, and a cameo by naturalist John Burroughs. Screenings of the pageant films became a recurring event at many following reunions.

Burroughs was a speaker at the 1920 reunion, and noted that "I have known more Mores in Roxbury since my boyhood than any other family - When I think of their success - and they have achieved success - I am persuaded to be a More!"

The association struggled to raise funds in the 1940s. A reunion was planned for 1945, but due to World War II it was first delayed until 1946 and then cancelled altogether.

Interest in the group waned through the following decades, but Eric More Marshall helped lead a revival in the 1970s. Marshall identified "lost" cousins who had not previously been involved in the group and drove outreach campaigns to expand membership. Under his leadership, JMA began holding some of the reunion events at SUNY Delhi, allowing out-of-state association members to have somewhere to stay when in the area.

The hundredth anniversary reunion in 1990 drew over four hundred Mores to Delaware County and attracted national media attention.

The planned 2020 reunion had to be canceled due to the COVID-19 pandemic, and was not held until 2022.

== Events ==
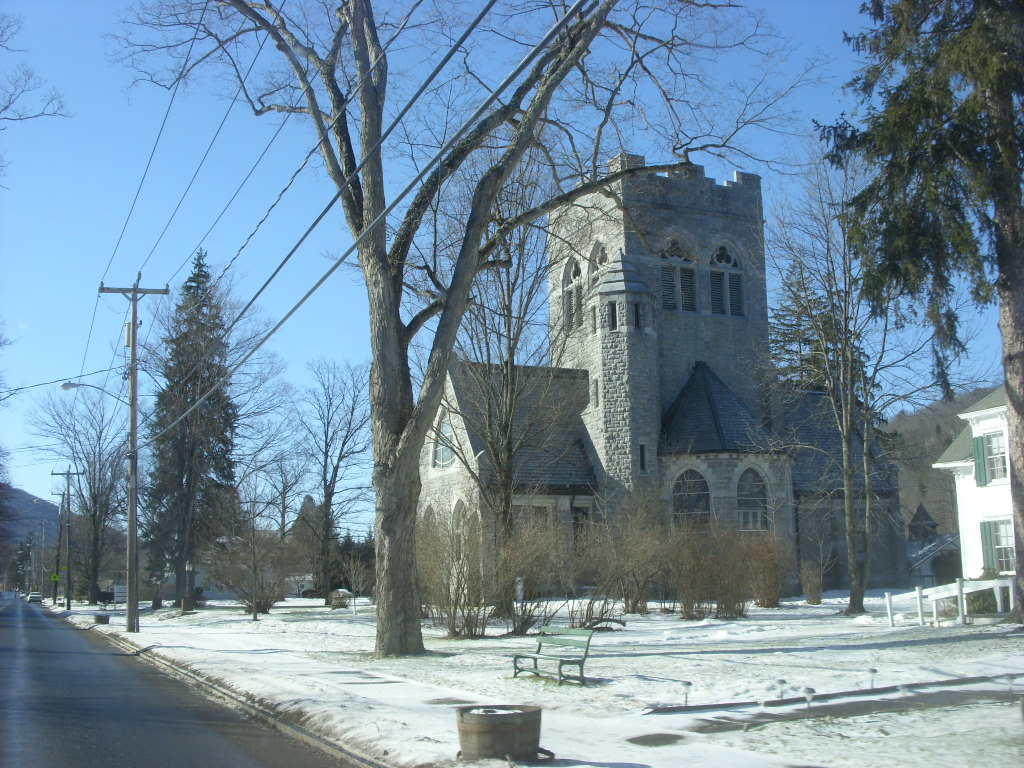
The Jay Gould Memorial Church in Roxbury, New York

The JMA has held quinquennial family reunions in Delaware County, New York, since 1890. Early reunions were held in early September, but since the mid-20th century they have been held in summer months. As a part of reunion, Mores often make visits to sites of family significance such as the ruins of John More's cabin near Hobart, Kirkside Park and the Jay Gould Memorial Reformed Church in Roxbury, and the Jonas More house at the Fenimore Farm & Country Village.

Reunions typically have involved a day spent in the hamlet of Roxbury. On that day, reunion attendees separate into groups for each branch of the family and hold a parade along the main road. The procession ends at the Roxbury cemetery where a memorial service is held at the monument to John and Betty Taylor More and the names of family members who have died in the past five years are read.

== Notable members and reunion attendees ==
- John Burroughs, naturalist and writer. A Roxbury native, Burroughs was a guest of honor at several early More Reunions.
- Bill Gaines, founder of MAD Magazine. Gaines was a guest at the 1985 More Reunion.
- Frank Jay Gould, philanthropist and son of Jay Gould. For many years he had donated prizes for events at reunions.
- Jay Gould, railroad magnate and financial speculator. Gould had planned to attend the 1890 reunion, but grew too ill to travel to Roxbury. His early support helped motivate others to join the JMA at its foundation.
- Kingdon Gould Jr., diplomat and businessman. Gould hosted parts of the 2010 reunion at his estate in the Catskills.
- William B. McKinley, member of the Senate and U.S. House of Representatives. McKinley was an early member of the JMA and helped select the design of the monument in Roxbury.
- Helen Gould Shepard, socialite and daughter of Jay Gould. Shepard was very involved in the JMA and hosted events at Kirkside, her Roxbury home, for every gathering from 1895 to her final reunion in 1935.

== Publications ==
The Historical Journal of the More Family was first published in April 1892. The main purpose of the Journal is to allow family members to remain in contact and share news such as births, marriages, and deaths. It proved useful for informing Mores of upcoming reunions and events. The Journal came close to going out of publication several times, but managed to continue through the association's existence. As the number of More descendants has risen, it's continued to be a useful way for increasingly widespread family members to stay informed of family news.

In 1893 the association published a History of the More Family and an Account of Their First Reunion in 1890, which summarized the family record as it was known up to that point. It included a genealogical record and brief biographies of many Mores, along with a detailed record of the first reunion.

The John and Betty Stories were written by Grace Van Dyke More and published in 1930. These Stories were an attempt by the association to tell the family origins and history of John and Betty Taylor More in a way that would entertain and inform younger family members.

In 1955, Chronicles of the More Family was published. This book encompassed the history of the More family, the JMA formation, and its history in the following years. Arthur W. Seacord wrote an expanded and more complete history of the early More family and their background in Scotland. Biographies of Mores were included along with genealogical information, making the book act in some ways as a follow-up to the 1893 history.
