= Roxbury station =

Railway station in Roxbury, New York, United States

Roxbury

General information
- Location: 101 Bridge Street, Roxbury, Delaware County, New York
- Tracks: 1

History
- Closed: March 31, 1954

Services
Preceding station	New York Central Railroad	Following station
Grand Gorge toward Oneonta	Catskill Mountain Branch	Halcottville toward Kingston Point
- Roxbury station
- U.S. Historic district – Contributing property
- Location: Roxbury, New York
- Nearest city: Stamford, New York
- Coordinates: 42°17′41″N 74°34′30″W
- Built: 1872
- Part of: Ulster and Delaware Railroad Depot and Mill Complex (ID03000254)
- Designated CP: April 18, 2003
Location

Roxbury station is a disused train station on the former Ulster and Delaware Railroad / West Shore "Catskill Mountain Branch" in the hamlet of Roxbury, New York. The station is a contributing property to the Ulster and Delaware Railroad Depot and Mill Complex, a historic district on the National Register of Historic Places.

== History ==
This depot was built by the Rondout and Oswego Railroad (R&O) with construction completed in January 1872. The R&O was reorganized into the New York, Kingston and Syracuse Railroad (NYK&S) only three months later, in April 1872.

The NYK&S only lasted until 1875, at which time it was reorganized into the Ulster and Delaware Railroad.

The station as built consisted of a single rectangular structure, with an internal dividing wall separating passenger and freight rooms.

It was substantially altered sometime between 1888 and 1891 by the U&D. Some believe Helen Gould Shepherd (railroad tycoon Jay Gould's daughter) designed and/or financed the renovation.

Local history has it, she wanted a more elaborate waiting room for her friends and family, so an addition was constructed on the north side of the building. The addition consisted of two rooms: the tickets agents office (facing the tracks through a bay window) also containing a telegrapher's office, and the main waiting room.

Also of particular note, this station was equipped with what is believed to be the first indoor flush toilet in Delaware County, and central heating, with a common coal fired furnace in the basement with duct work and registers to transport hot air to the Ticket Agent's Office & Waiting Room upstairs.

Another addition to the station at this time was a portico, or colonnade (open air roofed area similar to a pole barn) attached to the north side. Most U&D RR stations did not have this feature.

Roxbury, although not as busy as Halcottsville, did have several business located there, including a retail coal dealer, feed and grain supplier, and a paint factory as well as several local creameries.

Although passenger service ended on March 31, 1954, the station agent stayed on until 1957. After that date, it was subsequently used in two commercial ventures, first by a feed & grain dealer from 1959–1976 (when freight service ended this same year); and then by a body shop owner, in the mid-1990s. Although the entire station was covered with metal siding by the feed supplier, little was changed on the inside, making it one of the best preserved U&D stations.

== Roxbury Depot Museum ==
Today the Roxbury Station houses a multitude of interpretive display kiosks showing local history and interaction with local businesses, as well as maps and diagrams illustrating the history of the U&D RR, and scale dioramas of the station in various eras.

The structure itself, is in remarkably good shape (being protected by the sheet metal curtain wall); and the station is being restored by the Ulster and Delaware Railroad Historical Society, which other than the Roxbury Station restoration, has undertaken the restoration of a 1920 H. K. Porter, Inc Steam Locomotive; former BEDT 14; and a 1906 New York, Ontario & Western 4 wheel "Bobber" Caboose #8206].

== See also ==
- Ulster and Delaware Railroad Depot and Mill Complex
