= Fall Brook (Bear Kill tributary) =

- Location of the mouth of Fall Brook

Location
- Country: United States
- State: New York
- County: Delaware

Physical characteristics
- Source
  - coordinates: 42°19′18″N 74°30′21″W
- Mouth: Bear Kill
  - coordinates: 42°20′52″N 74°27′47″W
  - elevation: 1,299 ft (396 m)

Fall Brook also known as Toad Hollow Brook is a river in Delaware County, New York. It flows into Bear Kill southeast of Grand Gorge. It drains the northeastern side of Schultice Mountain and flows northeast through Toad Hollow.
