= Bear Kill =

Location
- Country: United States
- State: New York

Physical characteristics
- Source
  - location: Schoharie County, New York
- Mouth: Schoharie Creek
  - location: Grand Gorge, Delaware County, New York, United States
  - coordinates: 42°20′16″N 74°27′06″W
- Basin size: 25.7 mi^{2} (67 km^{2})

Basin features
- Tributaries
  - right: Jump Brook, Fall Brook

Bear Kill is a river which flows into the Schoharie Creek southeast of Grand Gorge, New York. The creek flows over Hardenburgh Falls.
