= Hardenburgh Falls =

Waterfall in Delaware County, New York, US

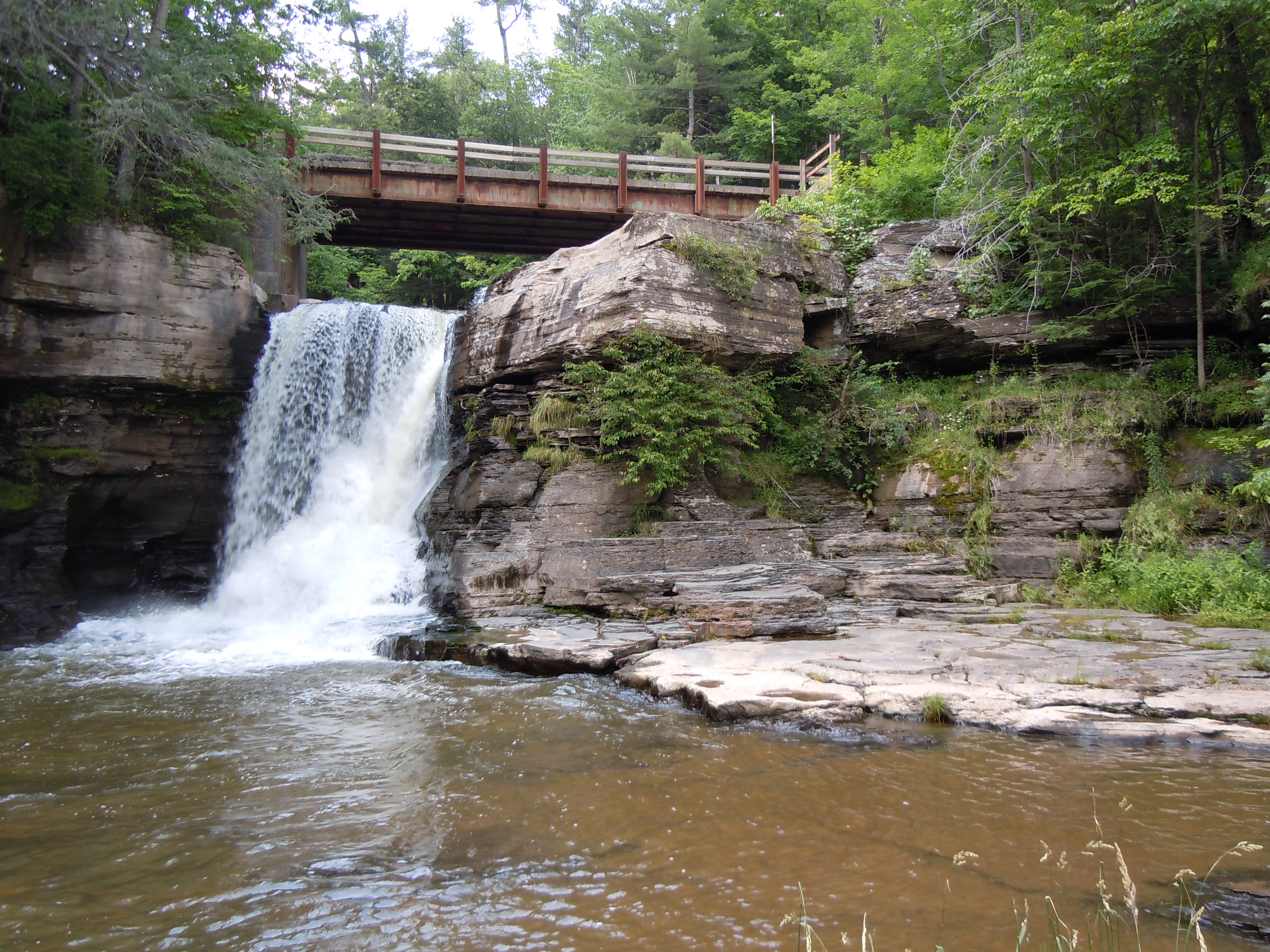
- Hardenburgh Falls

- Location within New York
- Coordinates: 42°20′16″N 74°27′06″W
- Elevation: 1,145 ft (349 m)
- Total height: 15 ft (4.6 m)
- Number of drops: 1
- Watercourse: Bear Kill

Hardenburgh Falls is a waterfall in Delaware County, New York. It is located west of Grand Gorge along NY–23, on Bear Kill.
