= First Old School Baptist Church of Roxbury and Vega Cemetery =

Historic site in Delaware County, New York

- U.S. National Register of Historic Places
- U.S. Historic district
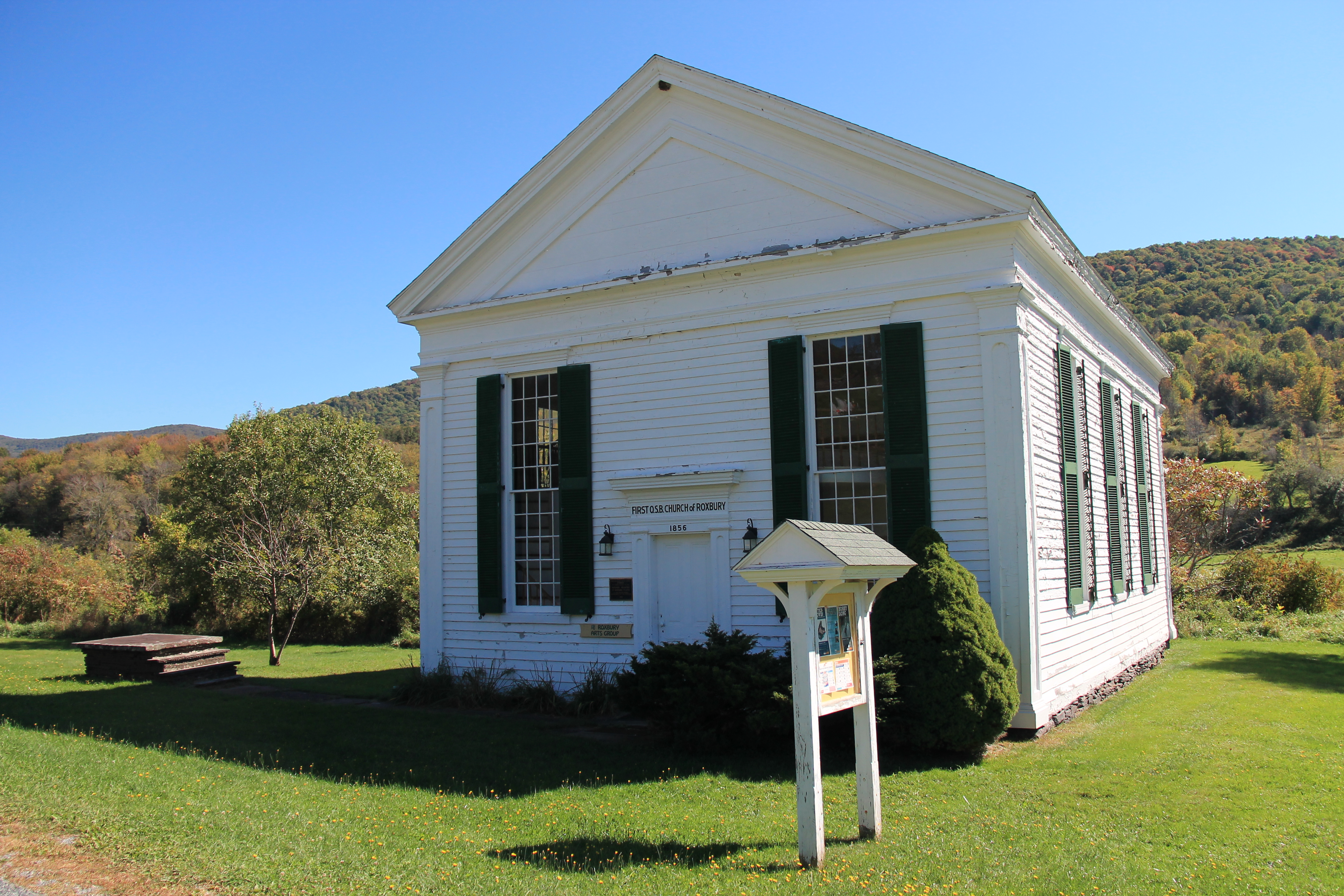

- Location within New York Location within the United States
- Nearest city: Roxbury, New York
- Coordinates: 42°14′58″N 74°32′10″W
- Area: 4 acres (1.6 ha)
- Built: 1856
- Architectural style: Greek Revival
- NRHP reference No.: 96000371
- Added to NRHP: April 12, 1996

First Old School Baptist Church of Roxbury and Vega Cemetery is a historic Baptist church and cemetery located at Roxbury in Delaware County, New York. The church was built in 1856 in a Greek Revival style and is a rectangular, front gabled frame building in the meeting house form. It was added to the National Register of Historic Places in 1996.

This building is currently a venue of the Roxbury Arts Group and is used seasonally for acoustic performances. The Roxbury Arts Group is located in the hamlet of Roxbury on 5025 Vega Mountain Road. To find out more about the Old School Baptist Church and the Roxbury Arts Group visit https://roxburyartsgroup.org/.

== See also ==
- National Register of Historic Places listings in Delaware County, New York
