= Walter Stratton House =

Historic house in New York, United States

- U.S. National Register of Historic Places
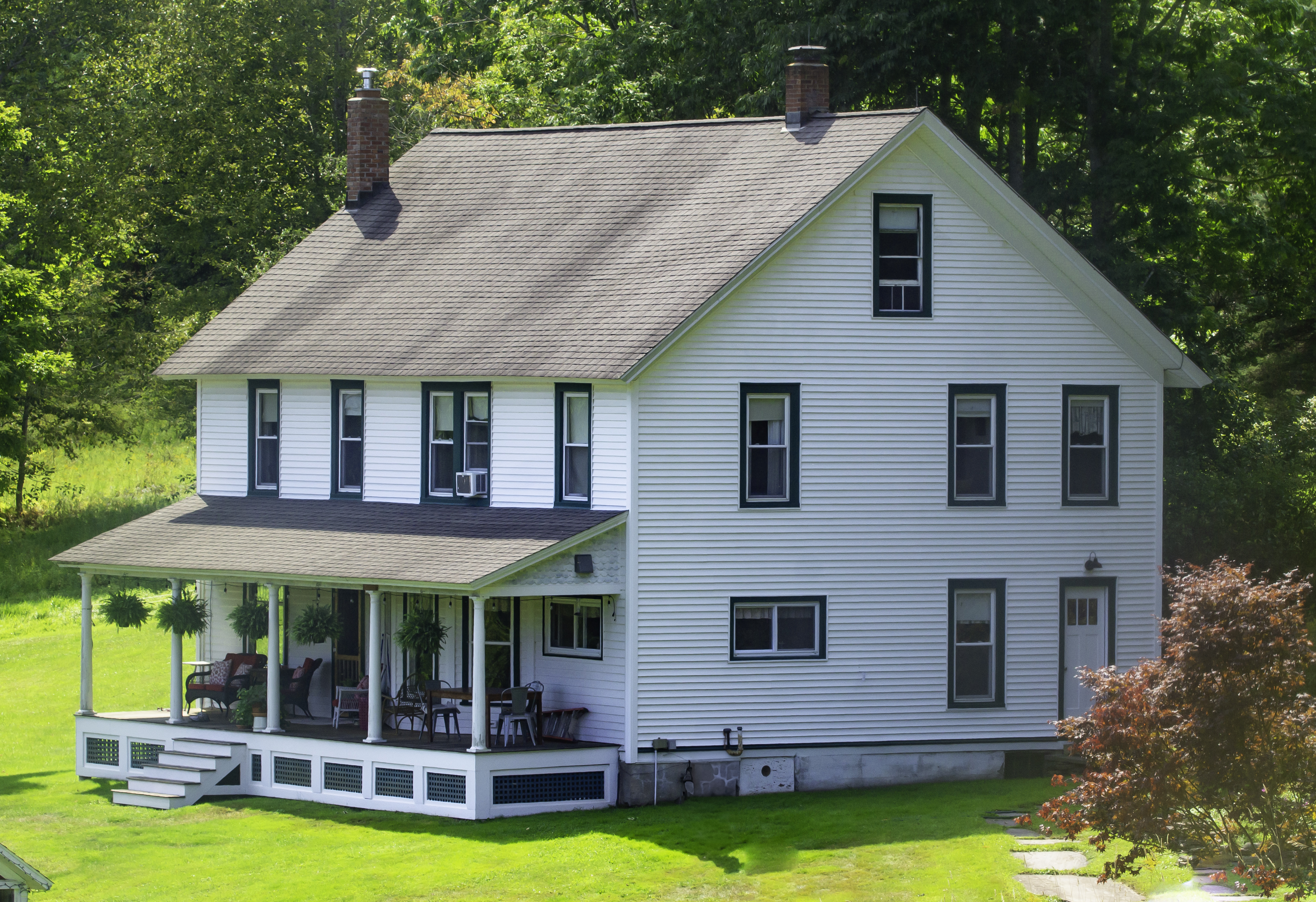

- Location within New York Location within the United States
- Nearest city: Roxbury, New York
- Coordinates: 42°15′21″N 74°37′0″W
- Area: less than one acre
- Built: 1828
- NRHP reference No.: 02001660
- Added to NRHP: December 31, 2002

Walter Stratton House is a historic home located at Roxbury in Delaware County, New York, United States. It was built in 1828 and is a small 1 1/2-story building on a deep fieldstone basement with a gable roof. It has a 1-story recessed frame wing. Also on the property is a 1-story frame garage. It is one of six extant stone houses in the town.

It was listed on the National Register of Historic Places in 2002.

== See also ==
- National Register of Historic Places listings in Delaware County, New York
