= Isaac Hardenbergh House =

Historic house in New York, United States

- U.S. National Register of Historic Places
- Location within New York Location within the United States
- Location: NY 23 north of junction with William Lutz Road, Roxbury, New York
- Coordinates: 42°20′14″N 74°27′11″W
- Area: 29.1 acres (11.8 ha)
- Built: 1790
- Architectural style: Georgian
- NRHP reference No.: 94001369
- Added to NRHP: December 12, 1994

Isaac Hardenbergh House, also known as the Hardenbergh Manor, is a historic home in Roxbury, New York, United States. It was built about 1790 and consists of a 2-story, five-bay center-entrance stone structure with a smaller 1 1/2-story frame addition built about 1820. Also on the property is a board and batten horse and carriage barn, the ruins of a large dairy barn, and gateposts partially constructed of millstones.

It was listed on the National Register of Historic Places in 1994.
