= Ulster and Delaware Railroad Depot and Mill Complex =

- U.S. National Register of Historic Places
- U.S. Historic district
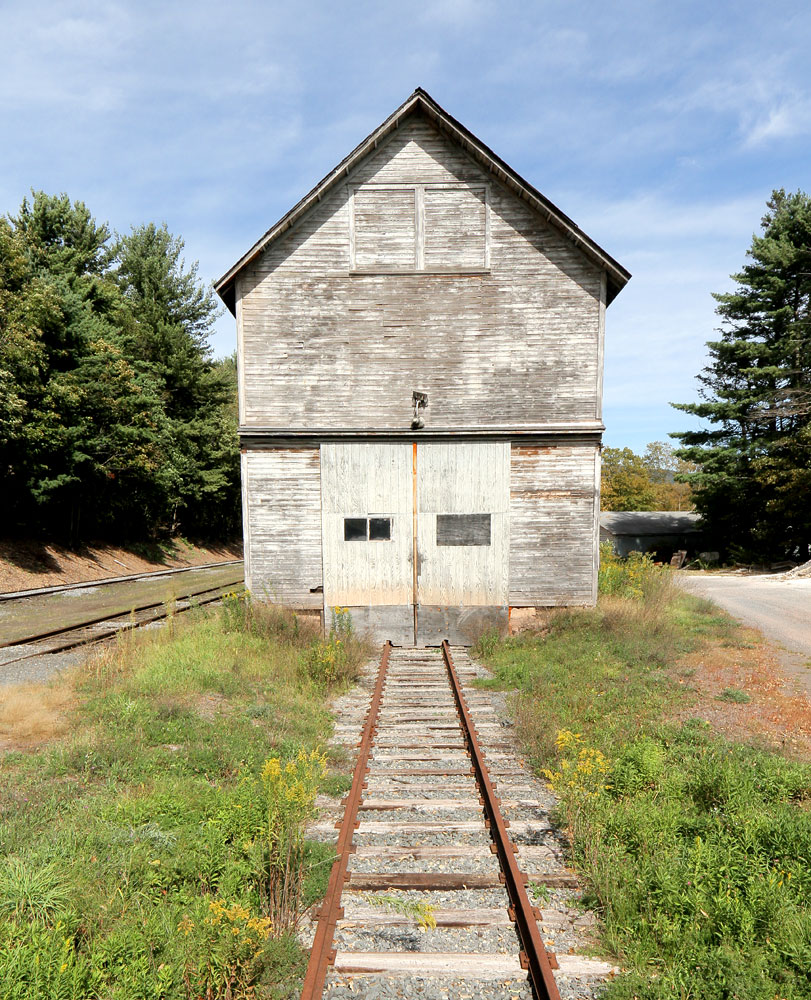

- Location within New York Location within the United States
- Location: Depot St., Roxbury, New York
- Coordinates: 42°17′4″N 74°34′11″W
- Area: less than one acre
- NRHP reference No.: 03000254
- Added to NRHP: April 18, 2003

Ulster and Delaware Railroad Depot and Mill Complex is a historic railroad depot and national historic district located at Roxbury in Delaware County, New York. The district contains five contributing buildings and one contributing structure. It was developed between about 1876 and 1946 and includes the Ulster and Delaware Railroad Depot, Robinson and Preston Steam Flour and Feed Mill, Slawson-Decker-Sheffield Co Creamery, Ulster and Delaware Railroad Ice House, and George M. Orr Blacksmith Shop.

It was listed on the National Register of Historic Places in 2003.

The Ulster & Delaware Railroad Historical Society operates the Roxbury Depot Museum in the railroad station.

== See also ==
- National Register of Historic Places listings in Delaware County, New York
