= Roxbury, New York =

- Town
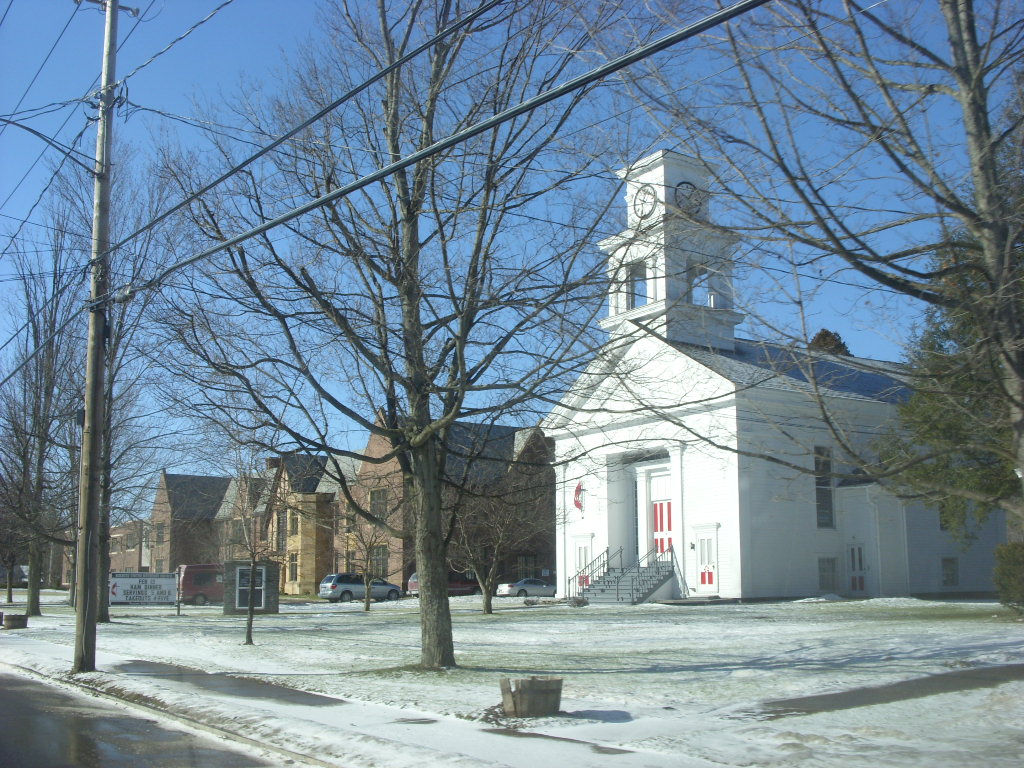
- Roxbury Central School and Methodist Church

- Location within the state of New York
- Coordinates: 42°18′02″N 74°33′11″W
- Country: United States
- State: New York
- County: Delaware

Government
  - Type: Town council
  - Town supervisor: Thomas S. Hynes (D)
  - Town council: Members' list: • Edward E. Raeder (D); • Gene Cronk (R); • Allen Hinkley (R); • Stephen D. Walker (D)

Area
  - Total: 87.60 sq mi (226.89 km^{2})
  - Land: 87.11 sq mi (225.62 km^{2})
  - Water: 0.49 sq mi (1.27 km^{2})
- Elevation: 1,506 ft (459 m)

Population (2020)
  - Total: 2,247
  - Density: 25.79/sq mi (9.959/km^{2})
- Time zone: UTC-5 (Eastern (EST))
  - Summer (DST): UTC-4 (EDT)
- ZIP Codes: 12474 (Roxbury); 12421 (Denver); 12430 (Fleischmanns); 12434 (Grand Gorge); 12459 (New Kingston); 12468 (Prattsville); 12167 (Stamford)
- Area code: 607
- FIPS code: 36-025-64001
- GNIS feature ID: 0979438
- Website: www.roxburyny.gov

Roxbury is a town in Delaware County, New York, United States. The population was 2,247 at the 2020 census. The town is at the eastern end of the county.

== History ==
The town of Roxbury was formed in 1799 from the town of Stamford. It was part of Albany county when the state of New York was first split into counties.

Locust Street, Roxbury-in-the-Catskills, about 1909

Roxbury was the birthplace and the home of naturalist John Burroughs. A memorial site has been placed by his birthplace. Jay Gould, the railroad financier, was also born in the town. The Main Street Historic District includes the Jay Gould Memorial Church and was listed on the National Register of Historic Places in 1988. Other sites on the National Register include the First Old School Baptist Church of Roxbury and Vega Cemetery, Isaac Hardenbergh House, Second Old School Baptist Church of Roxbury, Walter Stratton House, and Ulster and Delaware Railroad Depot and Mill Complex.

Author Walter R. Brooks of Mister Ed fame was a resident. He began visiting Roxbury in 1937, and he and his wife Anne moved to a home on Main Street in 1948, where he lived until his death in 1958. He wrote a number of books while in Roxbury, including many titles in the popular Freddy the Pig series.

== Culture ==
Roxbury is the home of community radio station WIOX (91.3 FM) which serves Delaware County and the Catskill Mountains region.

Since 1890 Roxbury has hosted reunions of the John More Association, held every five years. Typical events in the village include picnics in Kirkside Park, followed by a parade ending at the grave of John and Betty Taylor More at the Roxbury cemetery, where a memorial service is held.

== Geography ==
The eastern town lines border Greene and Schoharie counties.

According to the United States Census Bureau, the town has a total area of 87.6 square miles (226.9 km^{2}), of which 87.1 square miles (225.6 km^{2}) is land and 0.50 square miles (1.3 km^{2}), or 0.56%, is water.

The East Branch of the Delaware River has its source in a pond behind a tire shop just south of Grand Gorge. Most of the town lies in the valley of the East Branch or its tributaries, but the northeastern corner of the town drains via Johnson Hollow Brook and the Bear Kill to Schoharie Creek, a northward-flowing tributary of the Mohawk River and part of the Hudson River watershed.

== Demographics ==
Historical population
| Census | Pop. | Note | %± |
|---|---|---|---|
| 1820 | 2,488 | | — |
| 1830 | 3,214 | | 29.2% |
| 1840 | 3,013 | | −6.3% |
| 1850 | 2,853 | | −5.3% |
| 1860 | 2,558 | | −10.3% |
| 1870 | 2,188 | | −14.5% |
| 1880 | 2,344 | | 7.1% |
| 1890 | 2,272 | | −3.1% |
| 1900 | 2,134 | | −6.1% |
| 1910 | 2,164 | | 1.4% |
| 1920 | 2,258 | | 4.3% |
| 1930 | 2,267 | | 0.4% |
| 1940 | 2,277 | | 0.4% |
| 1950 | 2,227 | | −2.2% |
| 1960 | 2,238 | | 0.5% |
| 1970 | 2,252 | | 0.6% |
| 1980 | 2,291 | | 1.7% |
| 1990 | 2,388 | | 4.2% |
| 2000 | 2,509 | | 5.1% |
| 2010 | 2,502 | | −0.3% |
| 2020 | 2,247 | | −10.2% |
U.S. Decennial Census 2020

=== 2000 ===
As of the census of 2000, there were 2,509 people, 1,078 households, and 719 families residing in the town. The population density was 28.8 inhabitants per square mile (11.1/km^{2}). There were 2,026 housing units at an average density of 23.2 per square mile (9.0/km^{2}). The racial makeup of the town was 97.33% White, 0.44% African American, 0.52% Native American, 0.48% Asian, 0.08% Pacific Islander, 0.28% from other races, and 0.88% from two or more races. Hispanic or Latino of any race were 1.36% of the population.

There were 1,078 households, out of which 26.2% had children under the age of 18 living with them, 55.9% were married couples living together, 6.6% had a female householder with no husband present, and 33.3% were non-families. 28.8% of all households were made up of individuals, and 13.9% had someone living alone who was 65 years of age or older. The average household size was 2.31 and the average family size was 2.82.

In the town, the population was spread out, with 21.5% under the age of 18, 5.7% from 18 to 24, 23.2% from 25 to 44, 30.0% from 45 to 64, and 19.6% who were 65 years of age or older. The median age was 45 years. For every 100 females, there were 97.4 males. For every 100 females age 18 and over, there were 96.9 males.

The median income for a household in the town was $32,214, and the median income for a family was $40,721. Males had a median income of $32,500 versus $28,958 for females. The per capita income for the town was $20,177. About 11.4% of families and 13.4% of the population were below the poverty line, including 20.0% of those under age 18 and 6.7% of those age 65 or over.

== Communities and locations ==
- Roxbury – the hamlet of Roxbury (on Route 30) was once an incorporated village.
- Grand Gorge – a hamlet in the northern part of the town, where routes 23 and 30 intersect
- Grand Gorge Station – west of Grand Gorge
- Hardscrabble – north of the hamlet of Roxbury
- Hubbell Corners – northeast of the hamlet of Roxbury on Route 30
- More Settlement – north of the hamlet of Roxbury on Route 30
- West Settlement – west of the hamlet of Roxbury

== See also ==
- Roxbury Railroad Station

== Notable people ==
- Anthony P. German, Adjutant General of New York
