= Main Street Historic District (Roxbury, New York) =

Historic district in New York, United States

- U.S. National Register of Historic Places
- U.S. Historic district
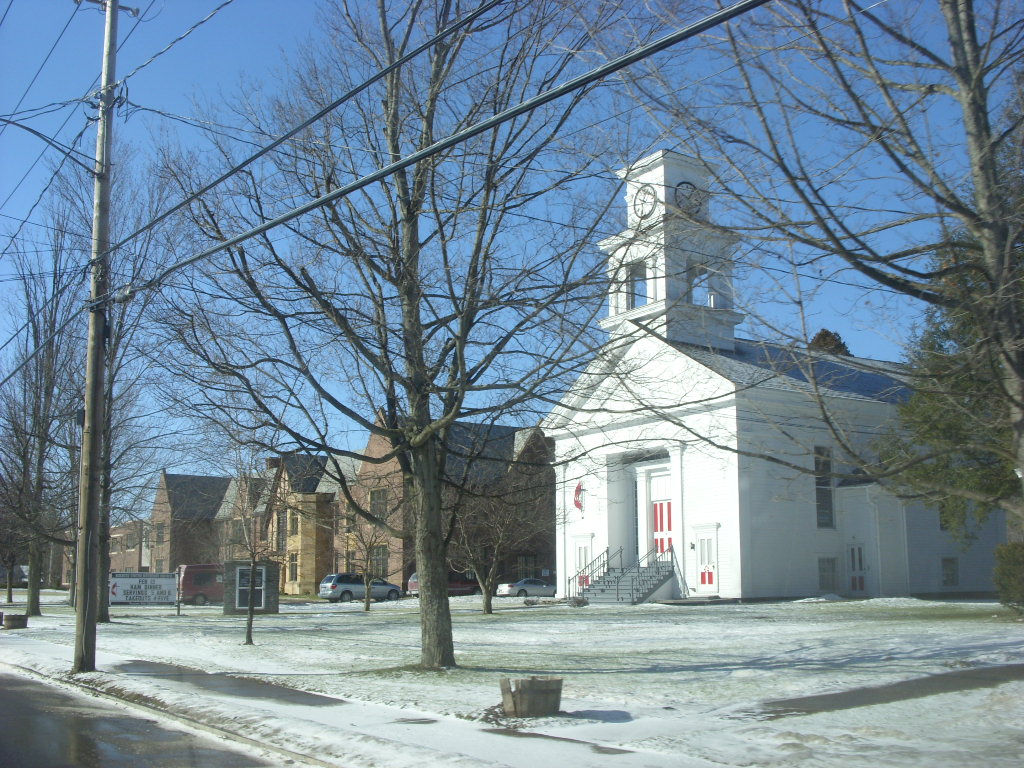
- Roxbury Central School and Methodist Church, February 2009

- Location within New York Location within the United States
- Location: Main St., Roxbury, New York
- Coordinates: 42°17′22″N 74°33′44″W
- Area: 50 acres (20 ha)
- Built: 1939
- Architect: Multiple
- Architectural style: Classical Revival, Greek Revival, Italianate
- NRHP reference No.: 88000111
- Added to NRHP: February 29, 1988

Main Street Historic District is a national historic district located at Roxbury in Delaware County, New York. The district contains 86 contributing buildings, three contributing sites, three contributing structures, and one contributing object. The southern end of the district is dominated by the Gothic Revival style Jay Gould Memorial Reformed Church (1892), the Roxbury Central School (1939), and the Kirkside estate. Located nearby is a Greek Revival style Methodist church erected in 1858. Financier Jay Gould was raised nearby and in the 1890s began an interest in the development of Roxbury.

It was listed on the National Register of Historic Places in 1988.

== Gallery ==
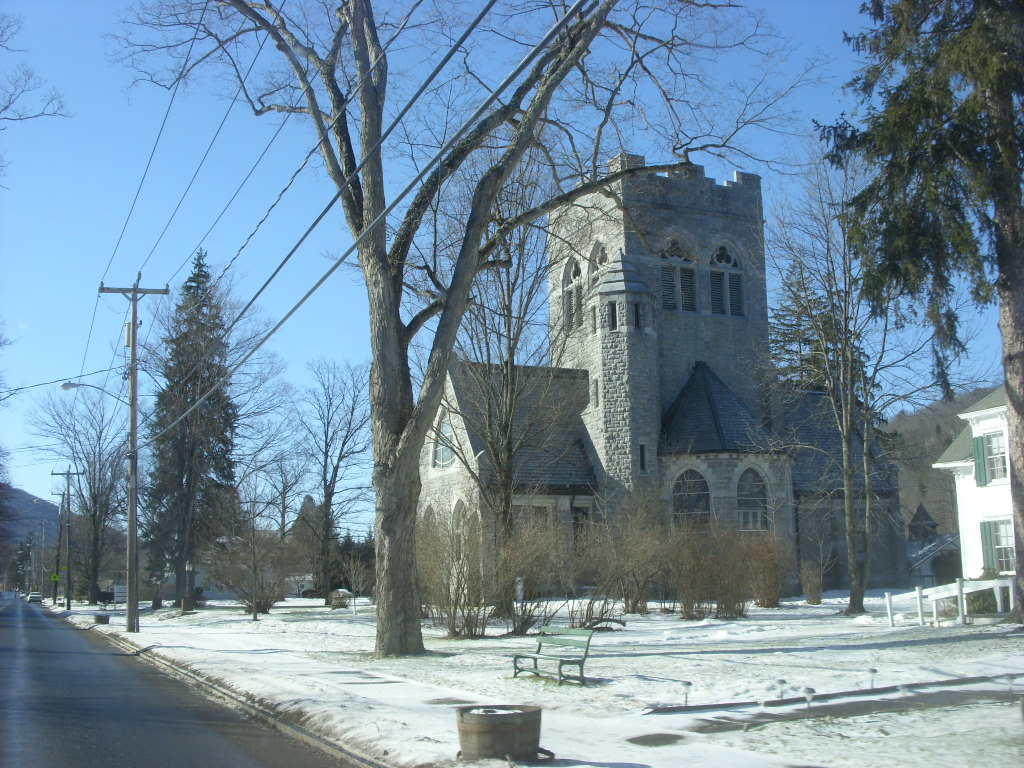
Jay Gould Memorial Church, February 2009

== See also ==
- National Register of Historic Places listings in Delaware County, New York
