= JMA Wireless Dome =

Stadium in Syracuse, New York, U.S.

- "The Loud House" ”The Dome”
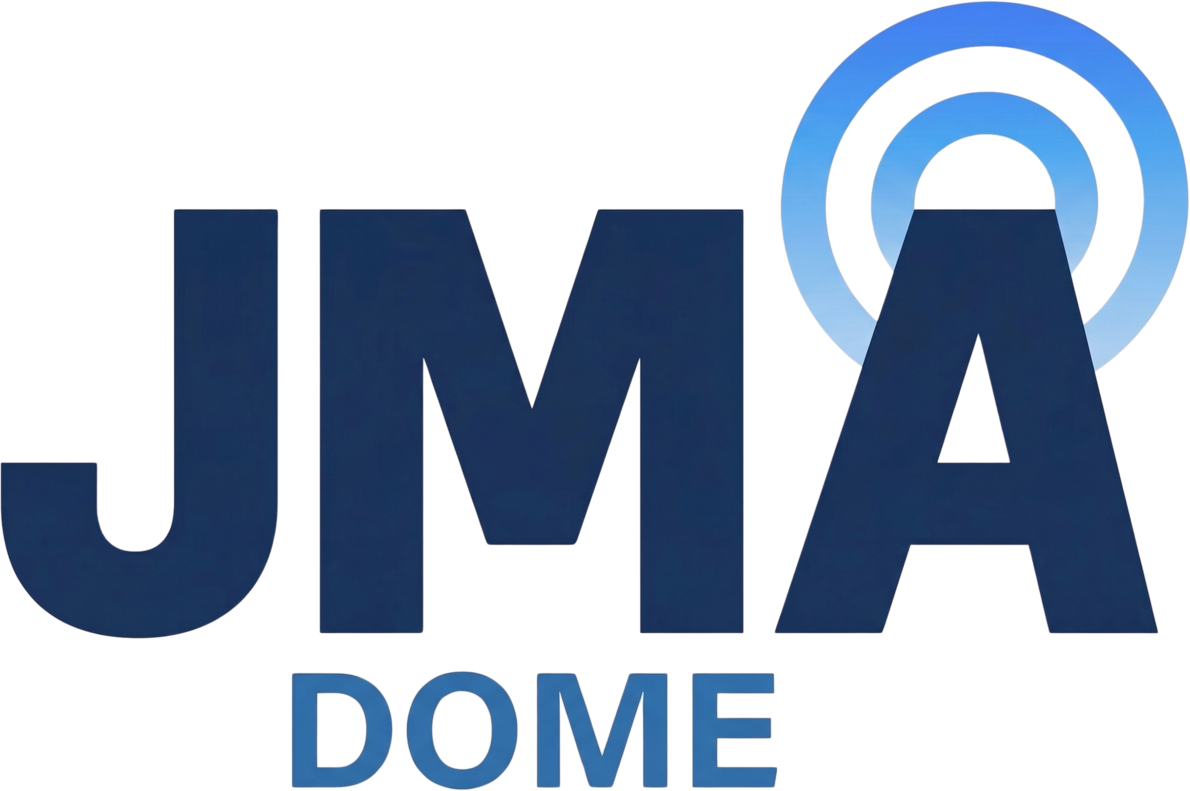

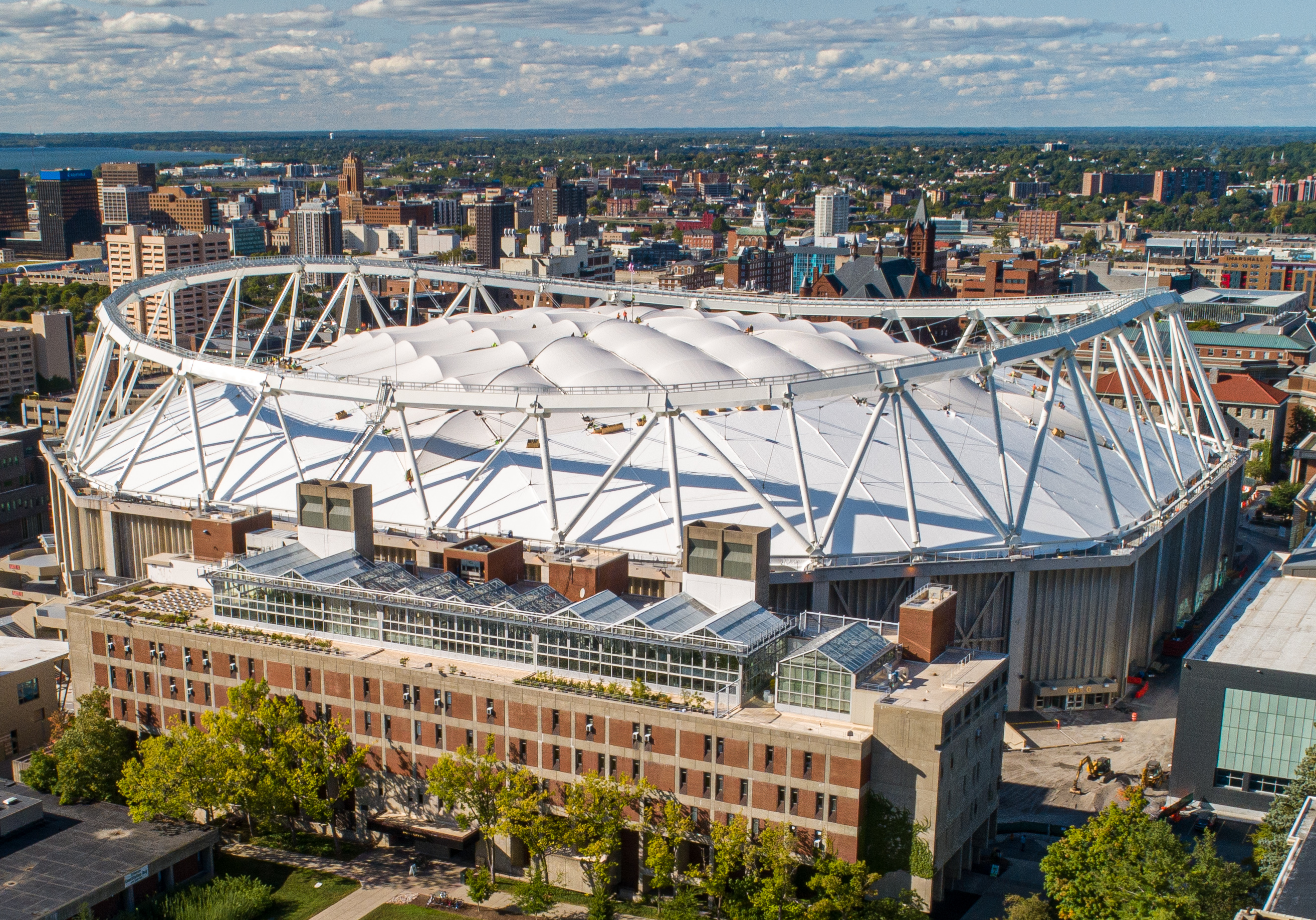
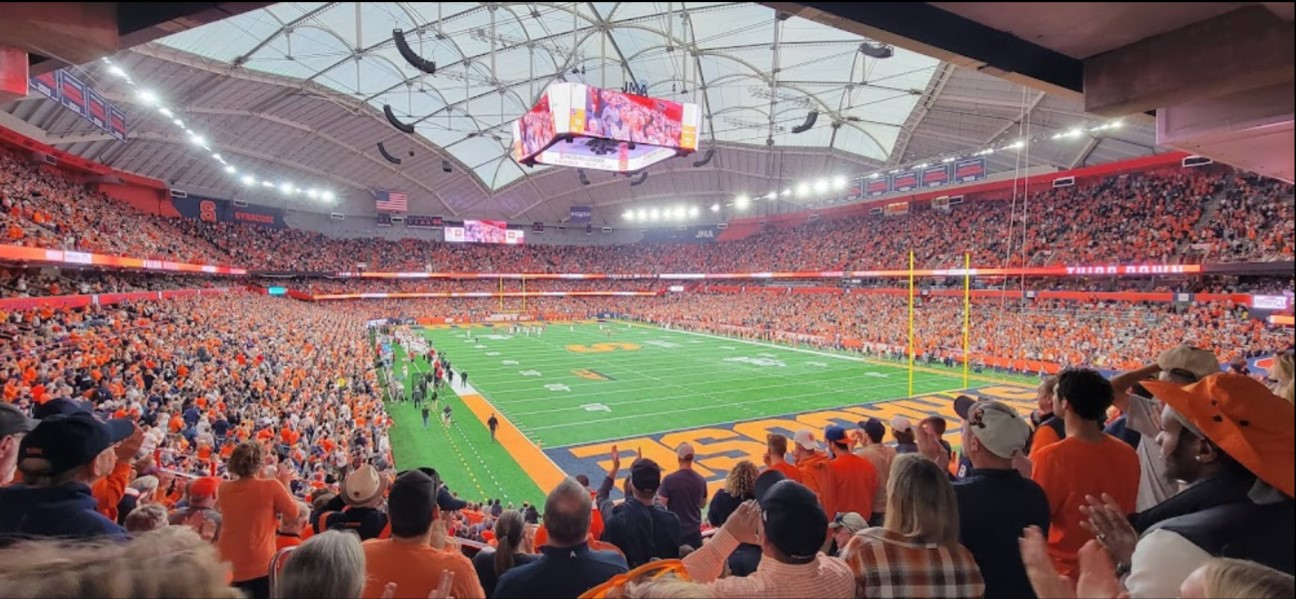
- JMA Wireless Dome c. 2020–2022

- Location in the United States Location in New York
- Former names: Carrier Dome (1980–2022)
- Address: 900 Irving Avenue
- Location: Syracuse, New York, United States
- Coordinates: 43°2′10″N 76°8′11″W
- Owner: Syracuse University
- Capacity: Football: 42,784; Ice hockey: 39,925; Basketball: 33,000; Concerts: 56,250 Former capacity List: 49,262 (2003–2020); 49,550 (1998–2002); 50,000 (1980–1997)
- Roof: Dome
- Surface: FieldTurf (2005–present); AstroTurf (1980–2004)
- Record attendance: Football: 50,564 (September 20, 1980); Basketball: 35,642 (February 23, 2019)

Construction
- Groundbreaking: November 11, 1978
- Opened: September 20, 1980; 45 years ago
- Cost: $25.63 million $118 million (renovations in 2021) $45 million (renovations in 2022)
- Architects: Finch-Heery; Hueber Hares Glavin
- Structural engineers: Geiger Associates (original structure and 2021–22 renovations)
- General contractor: Huber, Hunt & Nichols

Tenants
- Syracuse Orange (NCAA): Football (1980–present); Men's basketball (1980–present); Women's basketball (2006–present); Men's lacrosse (1980–present); Women's lacrosse (1980–present)

Website
- cuse.com/facilities/jma-wireless-dome

The JMA Wireless Dome, (Note: Colloquially, JMA Dome) originally the Carrier Dome (1980–2022), is a domed stadium in Syracuse, New York, United States. Located on the campus of Syracuse University in the University Hill neighborhood, it is home to the Syracuse Orange football, basketball, and lacrosse teams.

Since its opening 46 years ago in September 1980, the Syracuse men's basketball team has led the NCAA in average attendance 16 times and holds the NCAA records for highest total home court attendance in a season (537,949, 1990), highest average home court attendance in a season (29,918, 1989), and the largest home court single game attendance (35,642, vs. Duke, 2019).

In 2006–07, the women's basketball team began playing home games in the Carrier Dome. In May 2022, Syracuse University announced in April 2022 that Carrier Global Corp. would no longer hold naming rights to the venue. When Syracuse University and JMA Wireless announced the new naming rights in May 2022, it marked the first time the venue's name would change since the opening in 1980.

The JMA Wireless Dome is the largest domed stadium of any college campus, and the largest domed stadium in the northeastern United States. It is also the largest on-campus basketball arena in the nation, with a listed capacity of 35,642. In addition, the venue hosts high school football state championships, the annual New York State Field Band Conference championships, and occasional concerts.

== History ==
Toward the end of the 1970s, Syracuse University was under pressure to improve its football facilities in order to remain a Division I-A football school. Its on-campus stadium, Archbold Stadium, opened in 1907 and had not aged well. The stadium could not be expanded; earlier in the decade the capacity of the stadium had been reduced from 40,000 seats to 26,000 due to stricter enforcement of fire codes. Therefore, the university decided to build a new stadium on the site of Archbold, which, appropriately for the region's often cold weather, was to have a domed Teflon-coated, fiberglass inflatable roof.

Because it was built in-season in 1979 on the previous stadium's site, Syracuse played "home" football games at three different locations—New Jersey's Giants Stadium, home of the National Football League's New York Giants, Rich Stadium, home of the Buffalo Bills, and Schoellkopf Field, home of the Cornell Big Red. When it opened in September 1980, it was made clear just how loud it was inside; that night the new stadium's nickname, "the Loud House", was coined. The original inflatable roof, since replaced by a fixed roof, caused the sound produced to echo many times, multiplying the loudness produced inside.

The stadium also became the home of the men's basketball team, as a replacement for Manley Field House.

=== Dedications ===
In 2002, the basketball court was dedicated to Jim Boeheim, the longtime head coach of the men's basketball team.

In 2009, the field turf was dedicated to Ernie Davis, the first African American Heisman Trophy winner, in 1961. The field now reads "Ernie Davis Legends Field" between the 45-yard lines on the home side. Davis's number 44 was also placed along that yard line. The dedication took place during the game against West Virginia on October 10.

== Financing ==
The Carrier Dome was constructed between April 1979 and September 1980. The total construction cost was $26.85 million, including a $2.75 million naming gift from the Carrier Corporation. It was speculated at the time that political considerations helped this project advance. The State of New York provided a $15 million grant in 1978 for the Carrier Dome's construction. Democratic incumbent Governor Hugh Carey was thought to have trouble in his re-election campaign with upstate voters. He visited the site of the old Archbold stadium and was convinced by local officials and SU administrators on the utility of a dome. Carey won re-election to a second term following the approval of state funds, although the extent to which it helped him is unknown.

=== Naming rights ===
The stadium was called the Carrier Dome from 1980 until 2022, after the Carrier Corporation, who had a manufacturing campus in the area, gave the university $2.75 million naming rights grant towards its completion in 1979. This gift represented the first naming agreement for a college sports stadium and one of the first in all of sports.

On May 19, 2022, Syracuse University announced the signing of a 10-year naming rights deal for the stadium with locally based networking equipment manufacturer JMA Wireless, ending its 42-year deal with Carrier. The stadium is now called the JMA Wireless Dome, referred to as the JMA Dome.

== Design ==
=== Construction ===
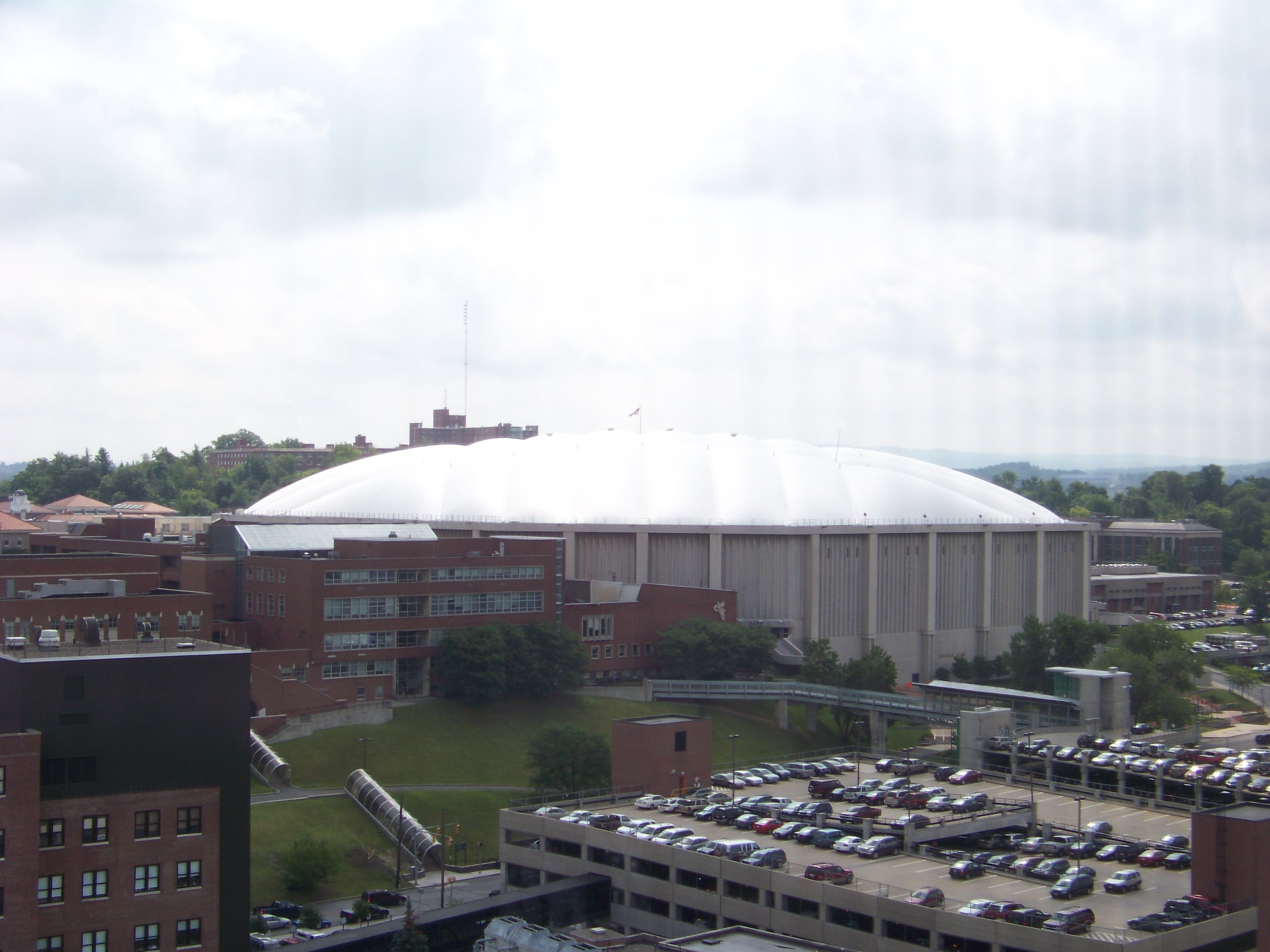
Original Carrier Dome

Huber, Hunt and Nichols, Inc. was the general contractor and Birdair Structure Inc. was in charge of construction of the inflatable roof. The original 220-ton roof was supported by sixteen 5-foot (1.5 m) diameter fans, each capable of generating 95,000 cubic feet (2,700 cubic metres) of air movement per minute, located in mechanical rooms on the north and south sides of the building. The fans directed over one million cubic feet of air per minute upward through the Dome's 36 main columns and under the roof. To avoid the accumulation of snow, air heated to 160 °F (71 °C) was pumped into the dead air space between the two layers of its roof to melt any snow before it could accumulate. The project involved more than 80 companies and transformed 30,000 cubic yards (23,000 cubic metres) of concrete and 880 tons of steel into the fifth largest domed stadium in the United States at the time of completion.

=== Renovations ===
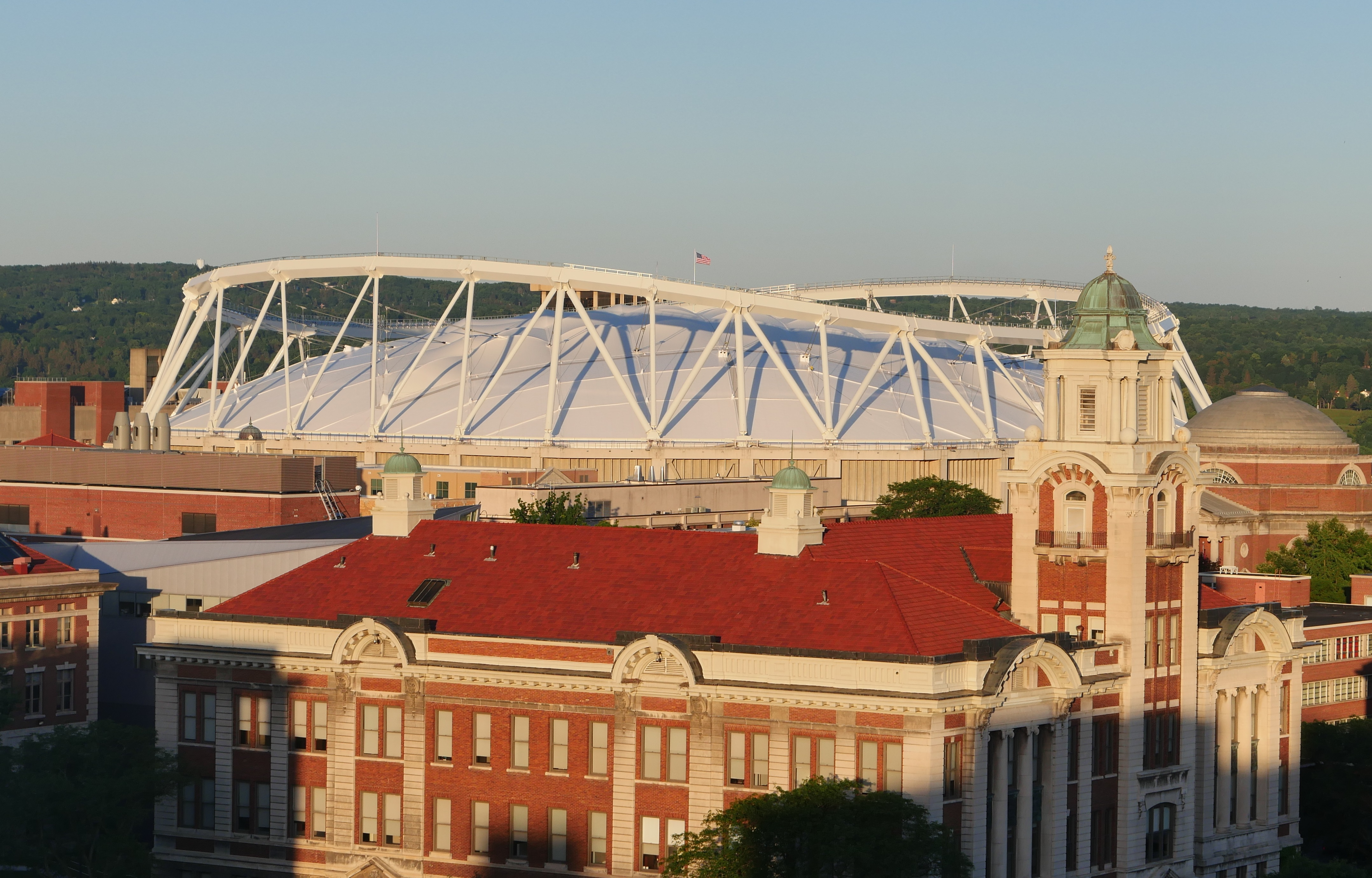
JMA Wireless Dome roof following the 2020 remodel

The Dome has been upgraded several times throughout the past 25 years. The inflatable roof was replaced in 1999 at a cost of $14 million; university officials sought to replace the inflatable roof with a cable-supported roof similar to the Georgia Dome but was ruled out due to costs and the time-frame needed for construction. FieldTurf was installed at the beginning of the 2005 football season, replacing the outdated AstroTurf. Additionally, the Dome received orange paint and banners between its decks, and its corridors were lined with historic photographs. In 2012, the university installed large end zone video displays, a 360-degree LED ribbon display, and an upgraded play clock.

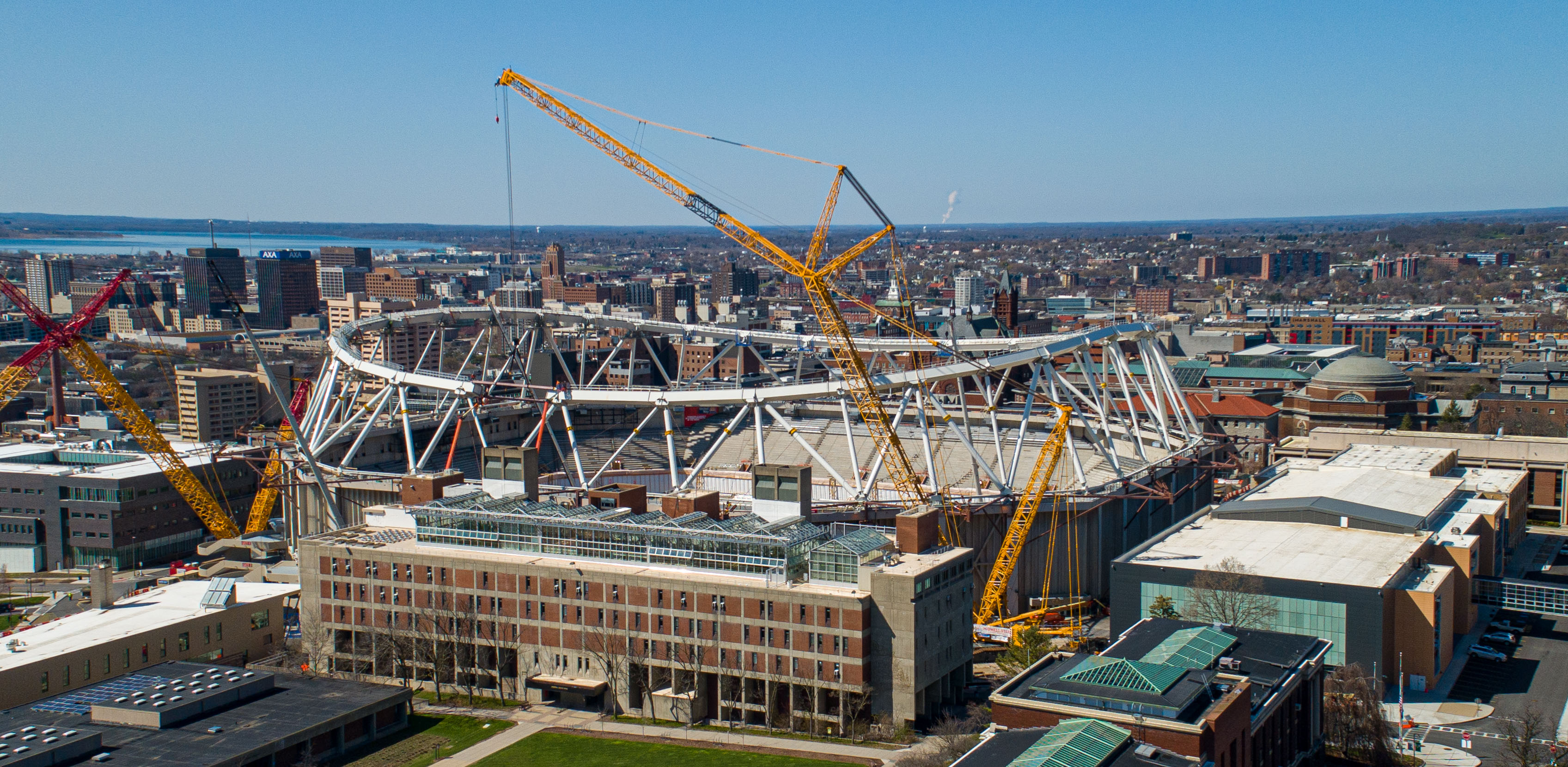
Remodeling of the Dome's roof in April 2020

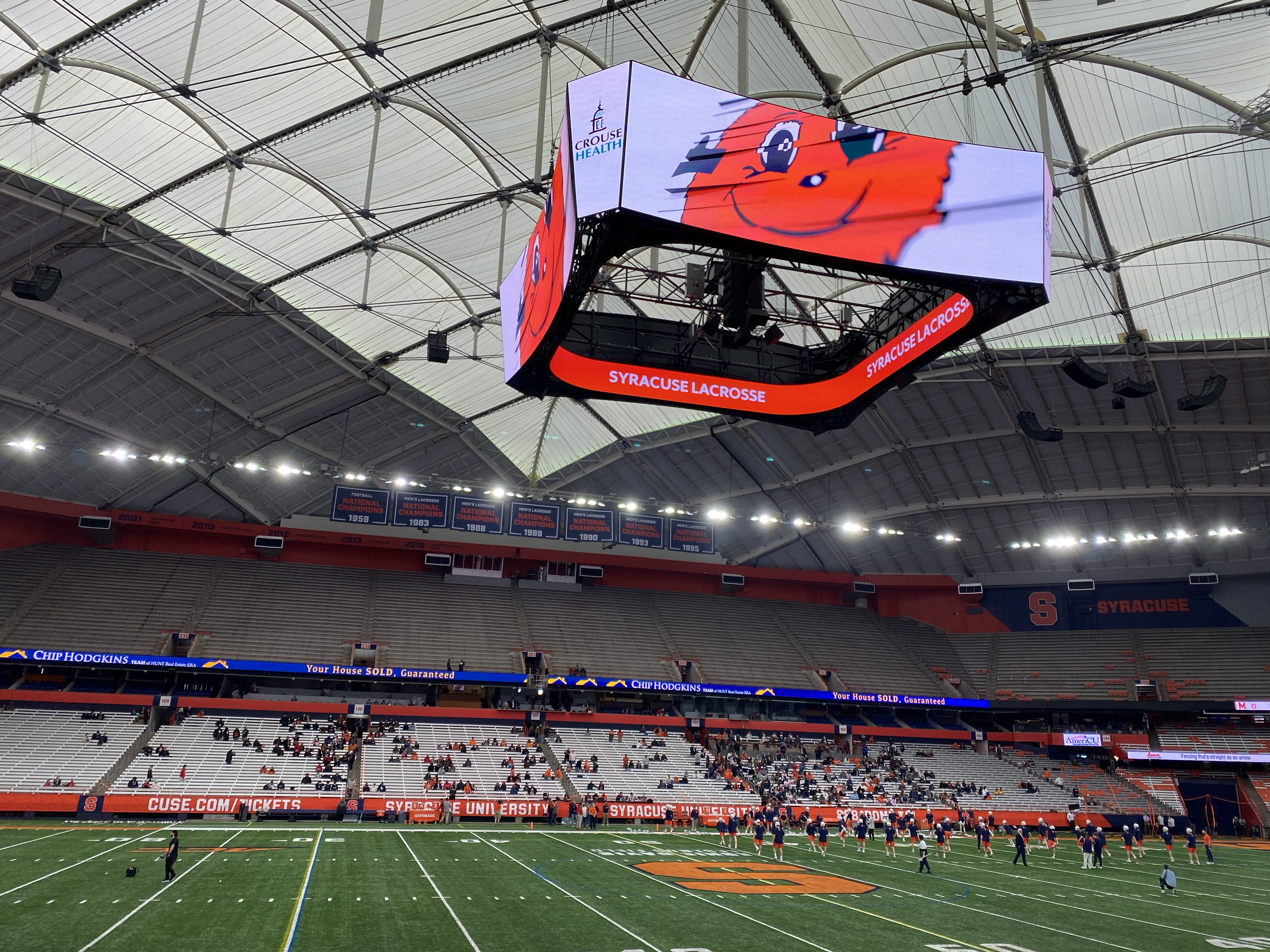
Interior of the renovated JMA Wireless Dome in Football/Lacrosse configuration in 2022, featuring large center-hung scoreboards

In May 2018, the university announced a major renovation to the Carrier Dome as the central portion of a larger campus update. The renovation, estimated to cost $118 million, was expected to be completed in 2022. The most significant changes are the replacement of the original air-supported roof with a fixed roof, two-thirds of which is translucent, along with the installation of air conditioning. The new roof was designed and engineered by Geiger Engineers - the same firm that was the structural engineer for the original stadium. The new roof was finished in September 2020; air conditioning was added for some spaces in 2020 and was completed in 2021. The upgrade also included a new scoreboard (which when it was unveiled was depicted to be able to be center hung over the football field and be moved to be over the basketball court, though the plan for the scoreboard to be moveable was later scrapped), new lighting and sound systems, Wi-Fi improvements, accessibility upgrades, improved restrooms, and new concession spaces. Unlike the original air-supported roof, the new roof does not require snow removal during winter storms. The new roof is also expected to make the Dome a more viable venue for major concerts; the original air-supported roof required the stadium have air locks, making it difficult to move equipment in and out. The high-profile renovation project was named a winner of NCSEA's 2021 Excellence in Structural Engineering Award for Forensic / Renovation / Retrofit / Rehabilitation Structures over $20 Million

The school announced the next phase of its work to enhance, elevate and expand the stadium experience in April 2022. This included an upgrade of the entire digital infrastructure, including latest 5G technology and wireless connectivity. In December 2022, the university announced the next phase of its work towards enhanced stadium experience, which will include a complete replacement of benches with individual seats; a construction of a new publicly accessible event facility adjacent to the Dome; and an upgrade of the entire digital infrastructure. This phase two work will begin in spring 2023 following Commencement and will be completed ahead of the 2024 football season.

== Accessibility and transportation ==
The JMA Wireless Dome is served by CENTRO buses. Shuttle buses transport fans to and from remote parking lots. Dedicated drop-off and pickup points for ride-hailing apps are maintained during game times.

OnTrack, the city's suburban rail line, served the Dome via its Syracuse University-Carrier Dome Station from 1994 to 2008. Service north to Armory Square and Destiny USA was offered year round, and south to Jamesville Beach seasonally. On game days, a special "Orange Express" service was offered.

== Notable events ==
=== Attendance records ===
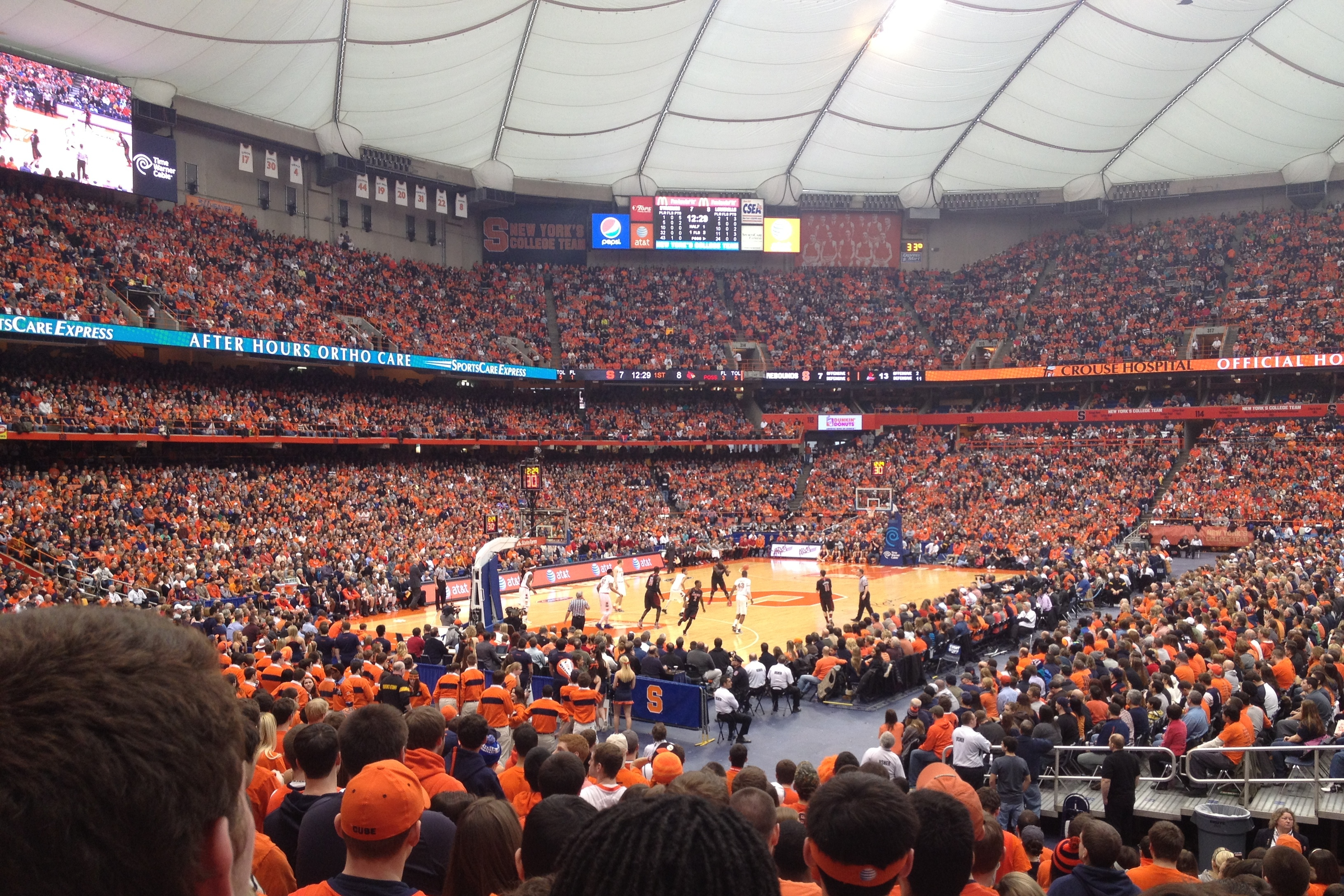
A men's basketball game between Syracuse and Louisville in the Dome in March 2013

Syracuse University's men's basketball per-game and single-season attendance numbers are annual contenders for the top rank in the nation. Lacrosse crowds are not as large, but the venue allows Syracuse's lacrosse teams to play home games throughout the February–May regular season. During the construction, Athletic Director Jake Crouthamel, to much protest from basketball head coach Jim Boeheim, decided to install a basketball court underneath the turf subsurface. This change, along with creation of the Big East conference, catapulted the attendance from around 9,000 at Manley Field House to routinely topping 30,000, making the program NCAA leader in attendance for 11 consecutive seasons starting in 1985.

The Carrier/JMA Wireless Dome has seen many of NCAA basketball's largest crowds. On February 1, 2014, the attendance record for an NCAA men's basketball on-campus game was broken by a few hundred spectators in the Duke vs. Syracuse ACC matchup. Attendance was announced as 35,446, as Syracuse went on to win 91–89, in dramatic fashion in overtime. This win marked the 21st straight win of the season for the Orange, breaking a school record for the longest unbeaten streak to start a season. The previous attendance record was set February 23, 2013 (35,012), the final game vs. long-standing Big East Conference rivals Georgetown Hoyas, as a member of the Big East. The Orange were defeated 57–46, ending the Orange's home win-streak at 38 games. Prior to the Georgetown Hoyas attendance record, Syracuse University held the previous attendance record also. On February 27, 2010, an announced attendance of 34,616 came to see the Orange beat the Villanova Wildcats 95–77. University officials briefly considered moving the basketball court to the middle of the football field for the 2014 regular season game with Duke- a move that could have pushed the attendance over 50,000. It was decided, to appease season ticket holders, that the court would stay in its usual location. However, the university did reconfigure the stadium to hold a new record capacity of 35,446.

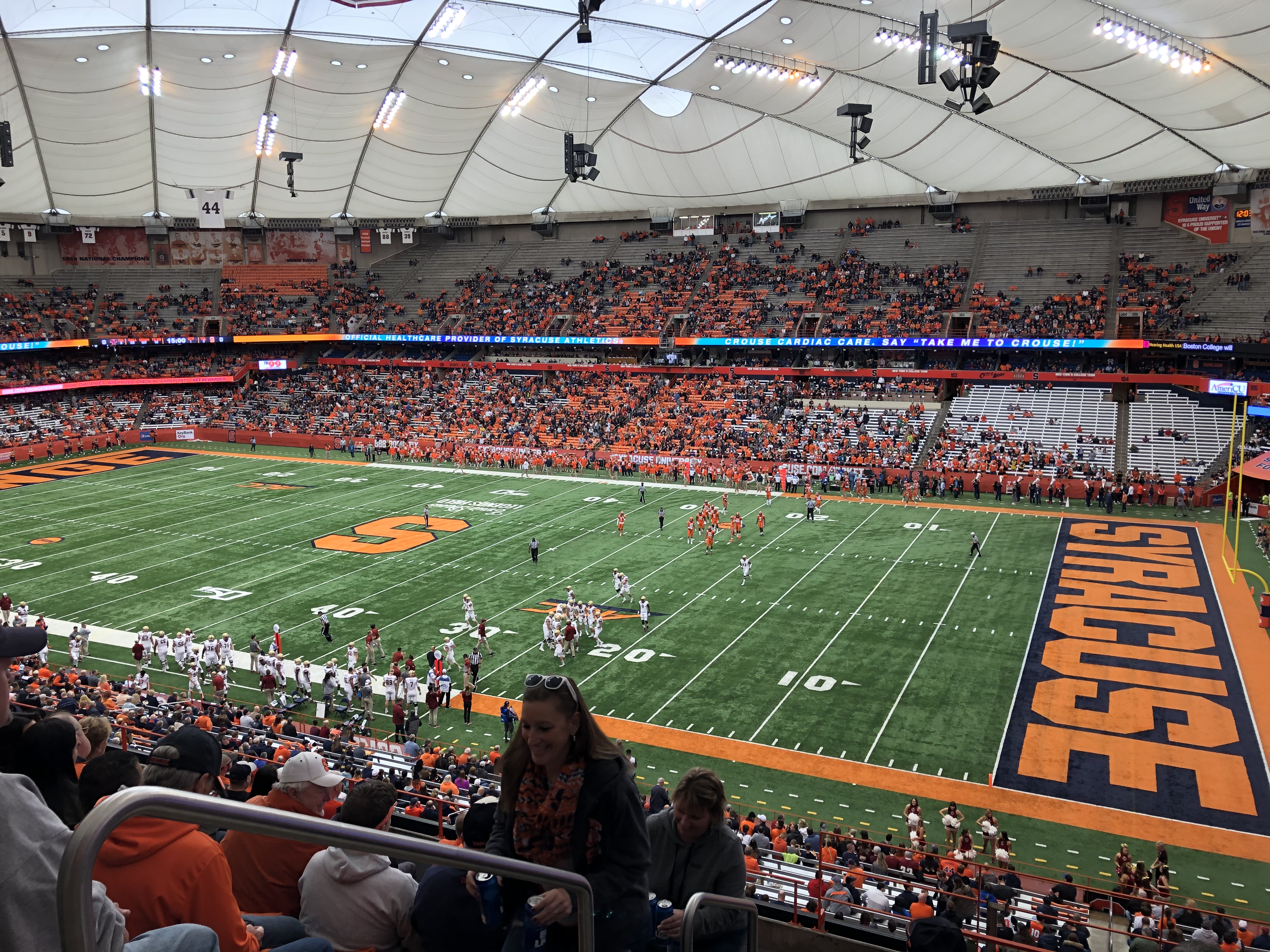
A football game between Syracuse and Boston College in the Dome in November 2019

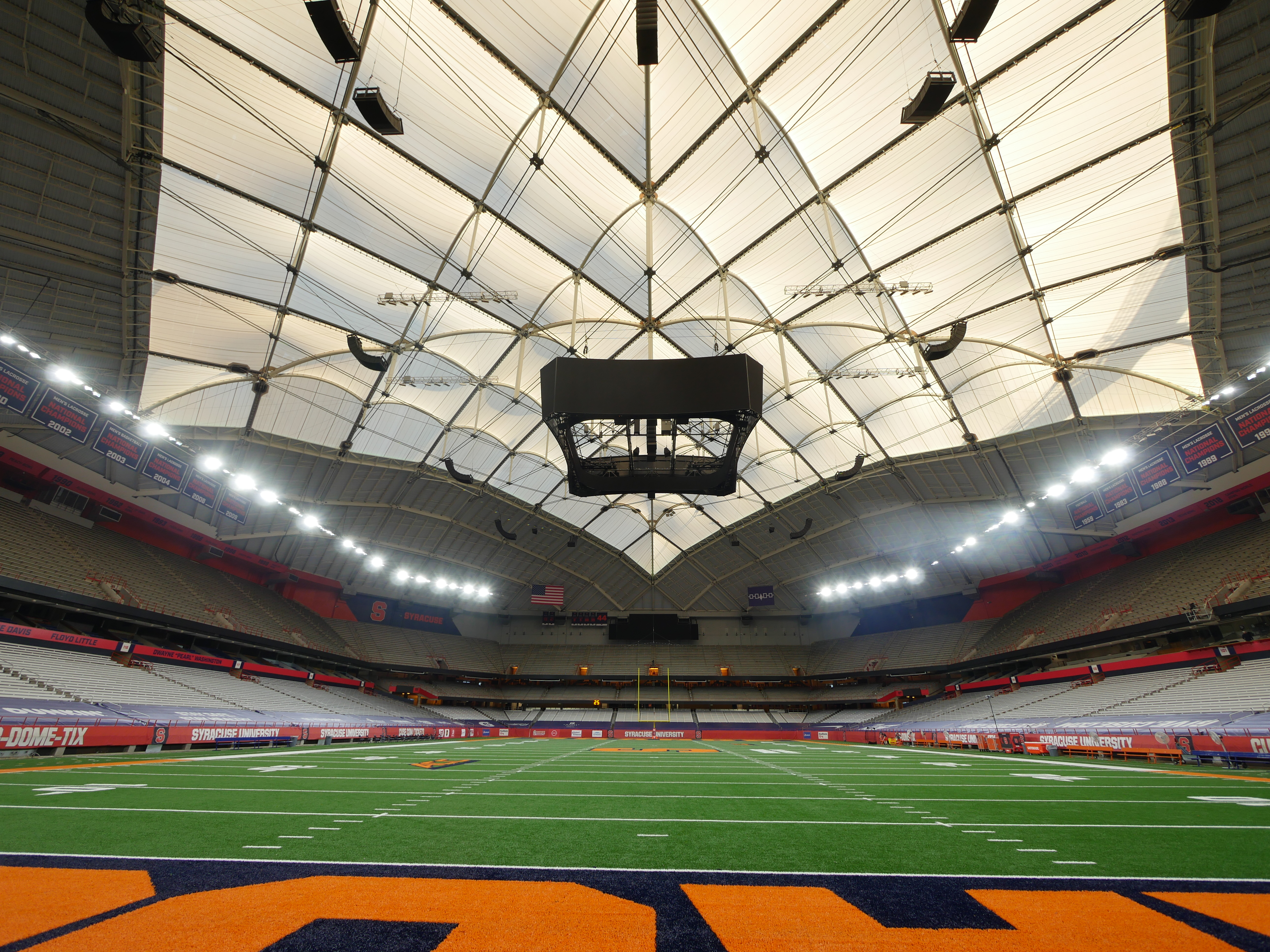
JMA Wireless Dome interior in 2020

For the 2018–19 season, Syracuse modified the stadium's basketball configuration to allow a maximum crowd of 35,642, and on February 23, 2019, the Orange drew that exact number for the visit of then top-ranked Duke, setting a new single-game record for on-campus college basketball attendance. This number ultimately surpassed the entire regular-season home attendance of 180 different NCAA Division I men's teams in that same season—more than half of the 353 teams that played in Division I.

On March 19, 2007, a new NIT attendance record was set, at 26,752, in the second-round men's basketball game against the San Diego State University Aztecs.

On November 22, 2014, the Syracuse Crunch of the American Hockey League set a new "United States Indoor Professional Hockey" record by playing in front of 30,715 fans at the Carrier Dome for the "Toyota Frozen Dome Classic". Syracuse defeated the Utica Comets 2–1. The (SUNY) Oswego State Lakers also hosted a game against the Utica Pioneers, establishing an NCAA record attendance for a Division III hockey game at 7,074 fans. Oswego tied Utica with a final score of 4-4.

On April 19, 2025, Metallica broke a 43 year old attendance record of the JMA Wireless Dome, with more than 47,319 people in attendance that night, making the band's concert the largest ticketed music event in Syracuse.

=== Tournaments ===
The 1981 Big East Conference men's basketball tournament was held there, as were the 1988 and 1991 Division I NCAA Men's Lacrosse Championships. The Men's NCAA basketball tournament East Regional semi-finals and finals have been held at the JMA Wireless Dome seven times (1983, 1997, 2000, 2002, 2005, 2010, and 2015). The NCAA Men's Division I Indoor Track and Field Championships were held there in 1984 and 1985.

=== Performing artists ===
Artists and entertainers who have performed at this venue include The Red Hot Chili Peppers, The Chainsmokers, Paul McCartney, Prince, Bon Jovi, David Bowie, Van Halen, Journey, Elton John, Billy Joel, Bruce Springsteen, Garth Brooks, Waylon Jennings, Linda Ronstadt, Rod Stewart, U2, Genesis, The Rolling Stones, The Police, Frank Sinatra, The Who, Neil Diamond, Bob Hope, Vanessa Williams, Kid Cudi, Kanye West, The Grateful Dead, Metallica, Santana, Duran Duran, Kenny Chesney, Ludacris, Chris Brown, Usher, Rick Ross, Meek Mill, Taylor Swift, Pink Floyd, Zac Brown Band, Macklemore, Macklemore & Ryan Lewis, Kesha, Kaskade, 50 Cent, Trey Songz, Drake, P!nk and Travis Scott among others.

=== Other events ===
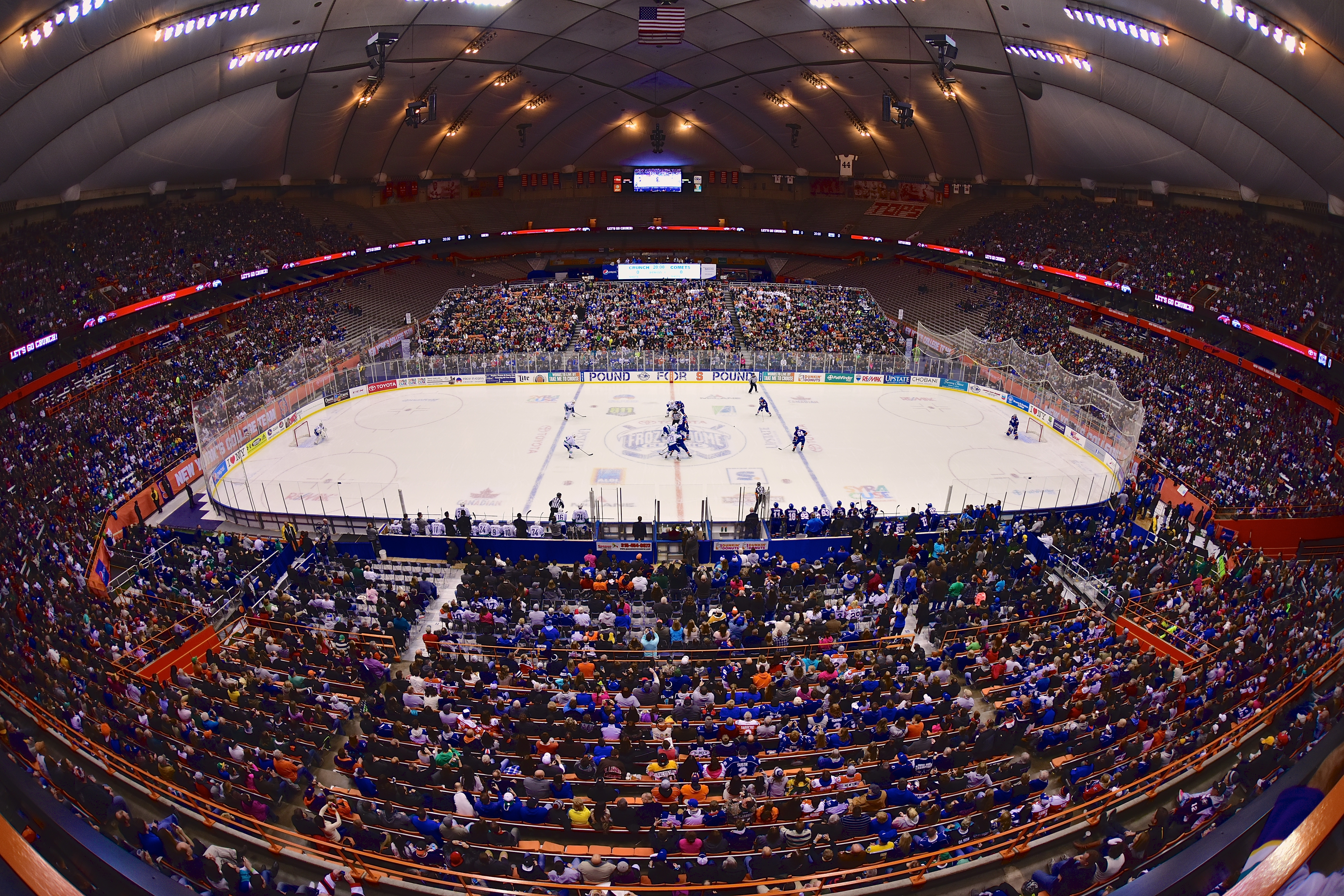
Syracuse Crunch and Utica Comets compete in the Frozen Dome Classic on November 22, 2014

The March 28, 1981, WBC world Welterweight boxing championship contest between champion Sugar Ray Leonard and challenger Larry Bonds, won by Leonard by tenth-round technical knockout, was held at the Carrier Dome, as the main event of a program that also featured Tony Ayala Jr., Bernard Taylor, Alex Ramos and future world champions Johnny Bumphus and Davey Moore.

On August 23, 1981, the Carrier Dome hosted an NFL exhibition game between the New Orleans Saints and the Philadelphia Eagles.

Each October, the stadium hosts the New York State Field Band Conference marching band championships. It also hosts the New York State High School Football Championships each November. A Billy Graham crusade took place at the JMA Wireless Dome in 1989. WWE have held numerous wrestling events at the JMA Wireless Dome going back to their WWF days. Since 2011, the stadium has been a stop on Monster Jam's stadium tour schedule.

On October 14, 2014, the Carrier Dome held an NBA preseason game between the New York Knicks and Philadelphia 76ers, which was a homecoming for the latter team, as they originated in Syracuse as the Nationals, departing Central New York in 1963.

On November 22, 2014, the Syracuse Crunch and Utica Comets hosted an American Hockey League game inside the Carrier Dome as part of the Frozen Dome Classic, which served as the 2014–15 edition of the AHL Outdoor Classic. This event was part of a day-long hockey event that also included the Utica College Pioneers and Oswego State Lakers, both based in NCAA Division III. Also, the cities of Syracuse and Utica participated in a law enforcement charity game.

The New York Mets conducted a pre-season practice at the Carrier Dome on March 26, 2019. It was the first baseball event staged at the Carrier Dome.

The stadium has also been used as a large classroom as well as for academic research projects.

== Accidents ==
The Carrier Dome has also been the site of a fatal accident. In June 1999, worker Bryan Bowman was killed when he fell through the dome roof to the bleachers 60 feet (18 m) below. He had been working with a crew from Birdair Incorporated, to replace the roof. The next month an electrician named Dave Paduana fell down a 50-foot (15 m) shaft while installing cables for a new speaker system. He survived with injuries to his leg, arm, back and ribs.

== See also ==
- List of NCAA Division I FBS football stadiums
- List of NCAA Division I basketball arenas

Events and tenants
Preceded by Rutgers Stadium I	Home of the NCAA Lacrosse Final Four; 1988	Succeeded by Byrd Stadium
