= Jay Gould =

American railroad magnate (1836–1892)

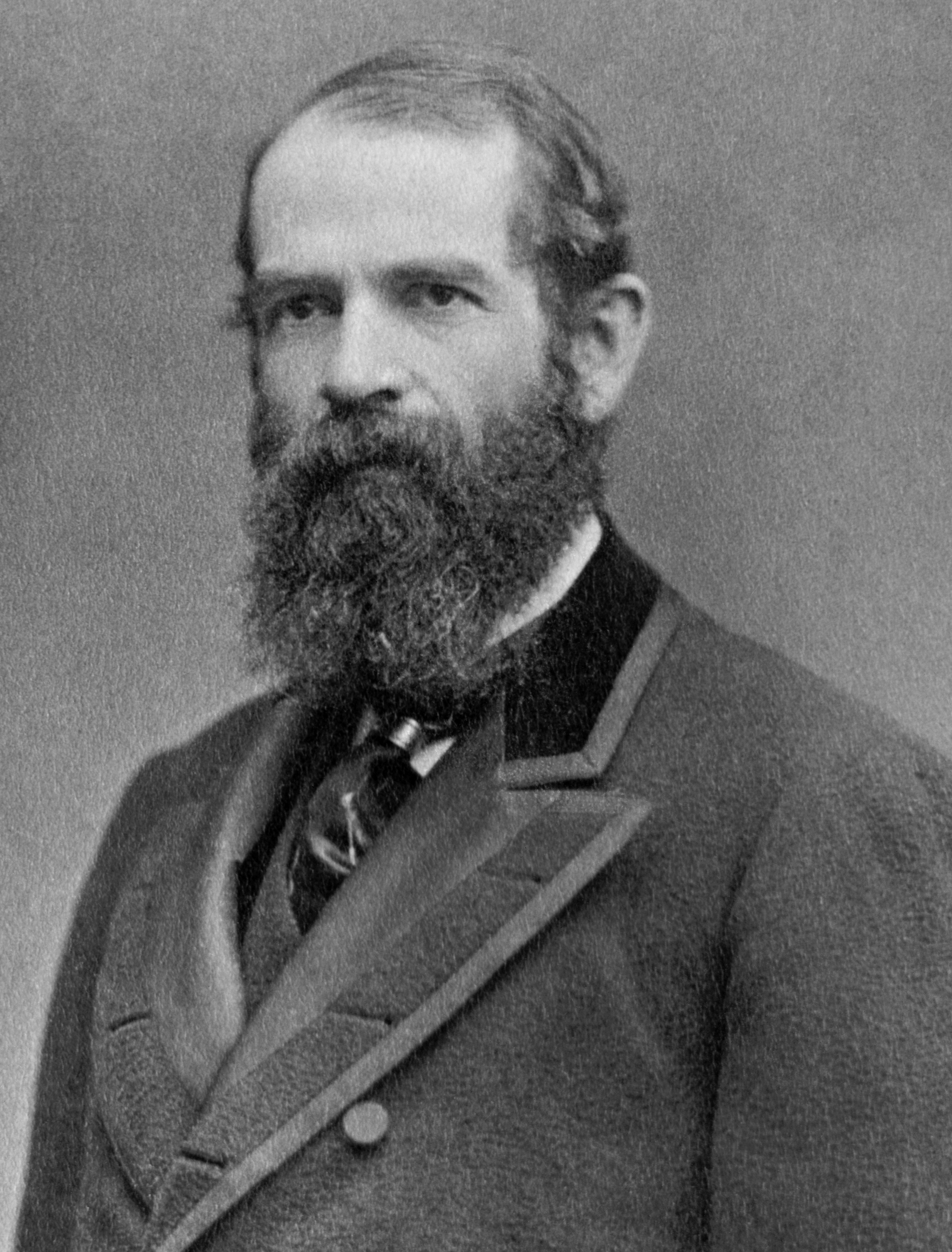
- Born: Jason Gould; May 27, 1836; Roxbury, New York, U.S.
- Died: December 2, 1892 (aged 56); New York City, U.S.
- Occupation: Financier
- Spouse: Helen Day Miller (m. 1863; died 1889)
- Children: George Jay; Edwin; Helen; Howard; Anna; Frank Jay

Jay Gould (/ɡuːld/; May 27, 1836 – December 2, 1892) was an American railroad magnate and financial speculator who founded the Gould business dynasty. He is generally identified as one of the robber barons of the Gilded Age. His sharp and often unscrupulous business practices made him one of the wealthiest men of the late 19th century. Gould was an unpopular figure during his life and remains controversial.

== Early life and education ==
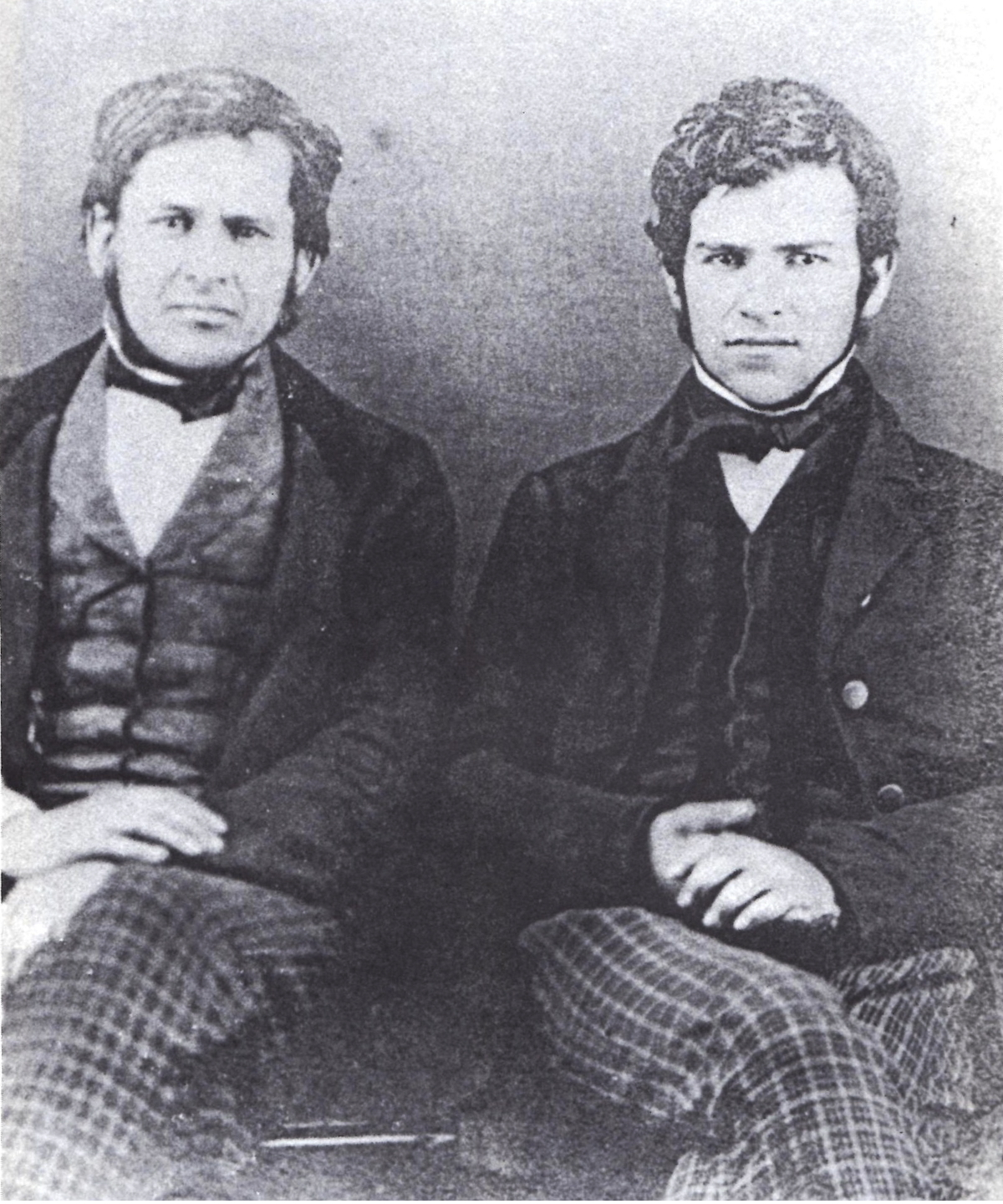
Jay Gould (right) in 1855

Jason Gould was born in Roxbury, New York, to Mary More (1798–1841) and John Burr Gould (1792–1866). His maternal grandfather, Alexander T. More, was a businessman, and his great-grandfather, John More, was a Scottish immigrant who founded the town of Moresville, New York. Gould grew up in poverty and had to work at his family's small dairy farm. As a young boy, he decided that he wanted nothing to do with farming, his father's occupation, so his father dropped him off at a nearby school with fifty cents and a sack of clothes. Gould studied at the Hobart Academy in Hobart, New York, paying his way by bookkeeping at a nearby blacksmith.

== Early career ==
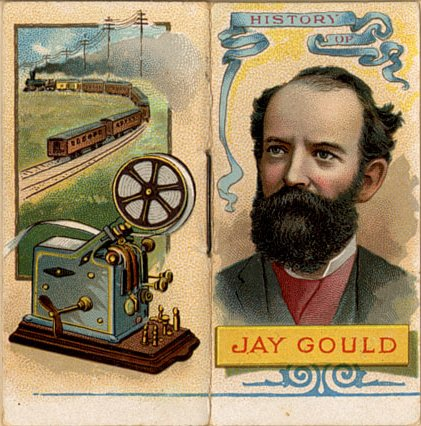
"History of Jay Gould," part of promotional booklet series "Histories of Poor Boys Who Became Rich and Other Famous People," published by W. Duke, Sons & Co. in 1888

The blacksmith offered Gould a half-interest in the blacksmith shop, which he sold to his father during the early part of 1854. Gould devoted himself to private study, emphasizing surveying and mathematics. In 1854, he surveyed and created maps of the Ulster County, New York, area. In 1856 (having by that time shortened his first name from Jason to Jay), he published History of Delaware County, and Border Wars of New York, which he had spent several years writing. While engaged in surveying, he started a side activity financing operators making wood ash, which is used with tannin in leather making.

In 1856, Gould entered a partnership with Zadock Pratt to create a tanning business in Pennsylvania, in an area that was later named Gouldsboro. He eventually bought out Pratt, who retired. In 1856, Gould entered a partnership with Charles Mortimer Leupp, a son-in-law of Gideon Lee and one of the leading leather merchants in the United States. The partnership was successful, until the Panic of 1857. Leupp lost all his money in that financial crisis, but Gould took advantage of the depreciation in property value and bought up former partnership properties.

Gould started an ice harvesting industry on the large Gouldsboro Lake. In the winter, ice was harvested and stored in large ice houses on the lakeside. He had a railroad line installed next to the lake, and he supplied New York City with ice during the summer months.

The Gouldsboro Tannery became a disputed property after Leupp's death. Leupp's brother-in-law, David W. Lee, was also a partner in Leupp and Gould, and he took armed control of the tannery. He believed that Gould had cheated the Leupp and Lee families during the collapse of the business. Gould eventually took physical possession, but he was later forced to sell his shares in the company to Lee's brother.

== Railroad investing ==
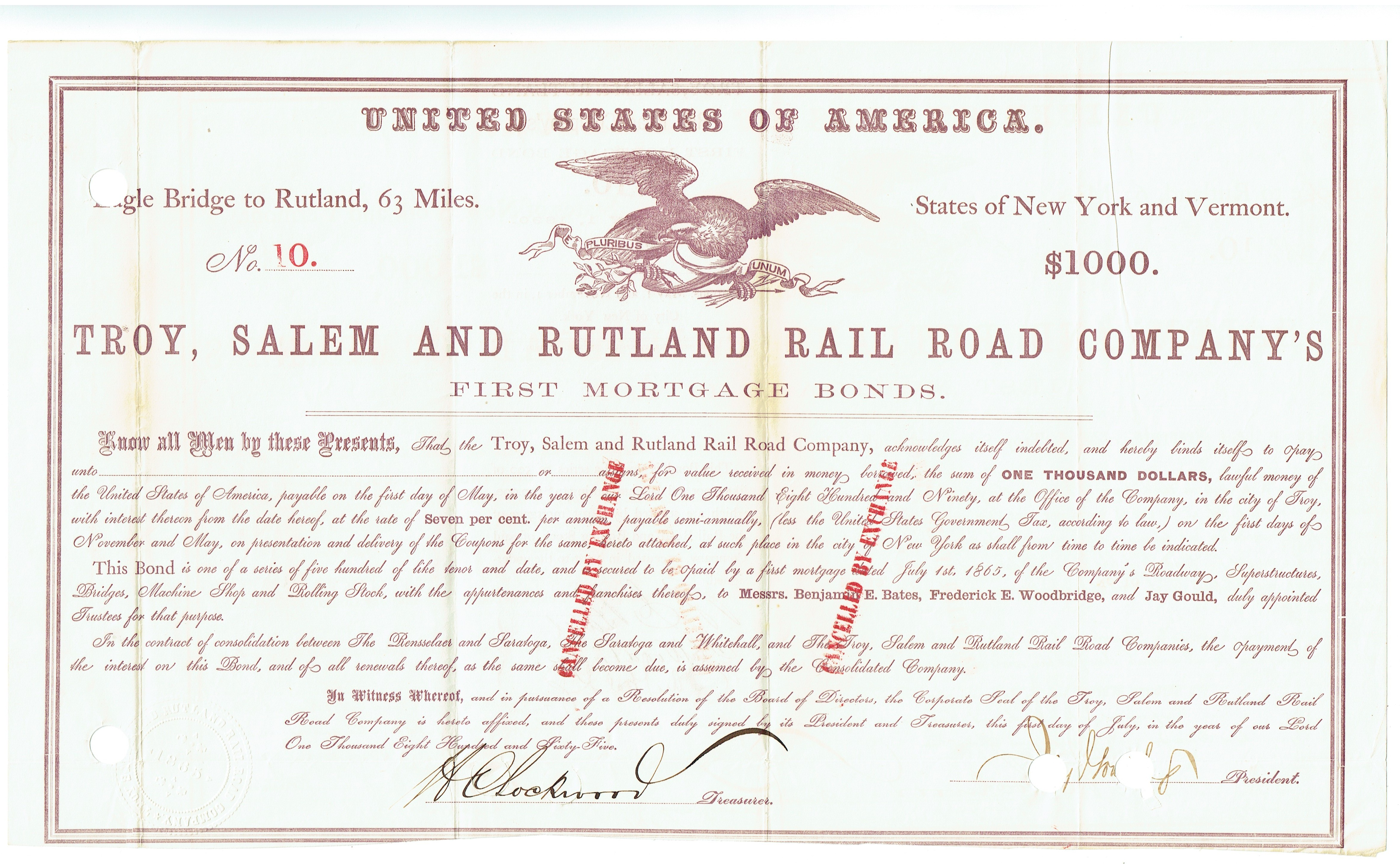
First Mortgage Bond of the Troy, Salem and Rutland Rail Road Company, issued 1 July 1865, signed by Jay Gould

In 1859, Gould began speculative investing by buying stock in small railways. His father-in-law, Daniel S. Miller, introduced him to the railroad industry by suggesting that Gould help him save his investment in the Rutland and Washington Railroad, during the Panic of 1857. Gould purchased stock for 10 cents on the dollar, which left him in control of the company. He engaged in more speculation on railroad stocks in New York City throughout the Civil War, and he was appointed manager of the Rensselaer and Saratoga Railroad in 1863.

The Erie Railroad encountered financial troubles in the 1850s, despite receiving loans from financiers Cornelius Vanderbilt and Daniel Drew. It entered receivership in 1859 and was reorganized as the Erie Railway. Gould, Drew, and James Fisk engaged in stock manipulations, known as the Erie War, and Drew, Fisk, and Vanderbilt lost control of the Erie in the summer of 1868, while Gould became its president.

== Tammany Hall ==
During the same period, Gould and Fisk became involved with Tammany Hall, the Democratic Party political machine that largely ran New York City at the time. They made its "boss", notorious William M. "Boss" Tweed, a director of the Erie Railroad, and Tweed arranged favorable legislation. In 1869, Tweed and Gould became the subjects of critical political cartoons by Thomas Nast. Gould was the chief bondsman in October 1871 when Tweed was held on $1 million bail. Tweed was eventually convicted of corruption and died in jail.

== Black Friday ==
To keep Vanderbilt from taking over their interests in railroad, Gould and Fisk engaged in financial manipulations. In August 1869, Gould and Fisk conspired to begin to buy gold in an attempt to illegally corner the market. Gould used contacts with President Ulysses S. Grant's brother-in-law, Abel Corbin, in an attempt to influence the president and his private secretary, General Horace Porter. These speculations culminated in the financial panic of Black Friday on September 24, 1869, when the greenback (cash) premium over face value of a gold double eagle fell from 62 percent to 35 percent. Gould made a small profit from that operation by hedging against his own attempted corner as it was about to collapse, but lost it in subsequent lawsuits. The gold corner established Gould's reputation in the press as an all-powerful figure who could drive the market up and down at will. Favored by Tweed Ring judges, the conspiratorial partners escaped prosecution, but the months of economic turmoil that rocked the nation following the failed corner proved ruinous to farmers and bankrupted some of the most venerable financial institutions on Wall Street.

== More railroads ==
=== Erie Railroad ===
In 1873, Gould attempted to take control of the Erie Railroad by recruiting foreign investments from Lord Gordon-Gordon, supposedly a cousin of the wealthy Campbell clan, who was buying land for immigrants. He bribed Gordon-Gordon with a million dollars in stock, but Gordon-Gordon was an impostor and cashed the stock immediately. Gould sued him, and the case went to trial in March 1873. In court, Gordon-Gordon gave the names of the Europeans whom he claimed to represent and was granted bail while the references were checked. He fled to Canada, where he convinced authorities that the charges were fallacious.

Having failed to convince Canadian authorities to hand over Gordon-Gordon, Gould attempted to kidnap him, with the help of his associates and future members of Congress, Loren Fletcher, John Gilfillan, and Eugene McLanahan Wilson. The group did capture Gordon-Gordon, but they were stopped and arrested by the North-West Mounted Police before they could return to the US. Canadian authorities put them in prison and refused them bail, which led to an international dispute between the United States and Canada. When he learned that they had been denied bail, Governor Horace Austin of Minnesota demanded their return, and he put the local militia on full readiness. Thousands of Minnesotans volunteered for an invasion of Canada. After negotiations, the Canadian authorities released the men on bail. Gordon-Gordon was eventually ordered to be deported, but he committed suicide before the order could be carried out.

=== Western railroads ===
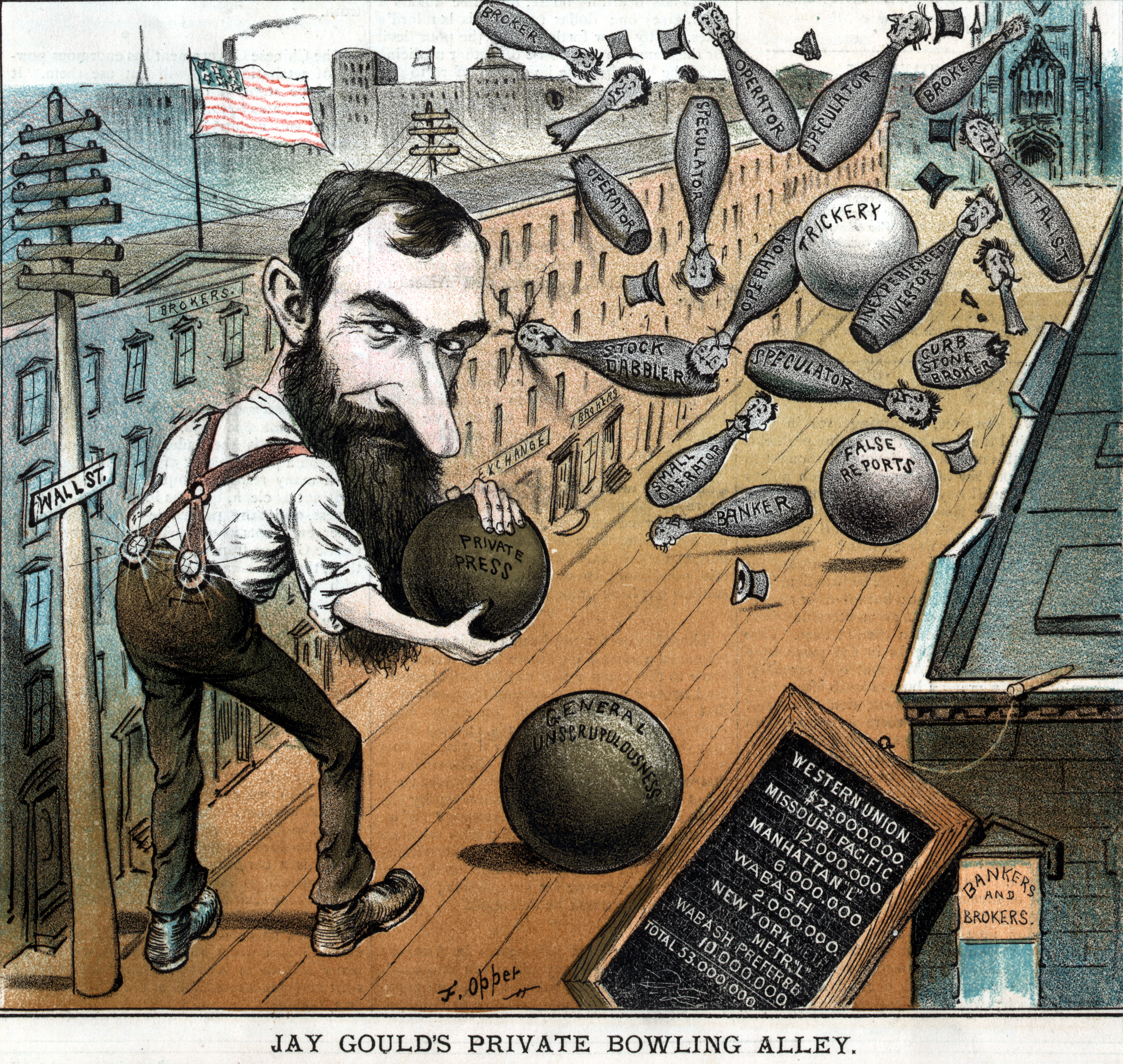
1882 cartoon depicting Wall Street as "Jay Gould's Private Bowling Alley"

After being forced out of the Erie Railroad, Gould started to build up a system of railroads in the Midwest and West. He took control of the Union Pacific in 1873 after its stock had been depressed by the Panic of 1873, and he built a viable railroad that depended on shipments from farmers and ranchers. He immersed himself in every operational and financial detail of the Union Pacific system, building an encyclopedic knowledge of the network and acting decisively to shape its destiny. Biographer Maury Klein states "he revised its financial structure, waged its competitive struggles, captained its political battles, revamped its administration, formulated its rate policies, and promoted the development of resources along its lines."

By 1879, Gould had gained control of the Missouri Pacific Railroad and the Denver and Rio Grande Railway. He controlled 10,000 miles (16,000 km) of railway, about one-ninth of the rail network in the United States at that time. He obtained a controlling interest in the Western Union telegraph company and, after 1881, in the elevated railways in New York City, and he had a controlling interest in 15 percent of the country's railway tracks by 1882. The railroads were making profits and could set their own rates, so his wealth increased dramatically. Gould withdrew from management of the Union Pacific in 1883, amid political controversy over its debts to the federal government, but he realized a large profit for himself. In 1889, he organized the Terminal Railroad Association of St. Louis, which acquired a bottleneck in east–west railroad traffic at St. Louis, but after Gould died the government brought an antitrust suit to eliminate the bottleneck control.

== Personal life ==
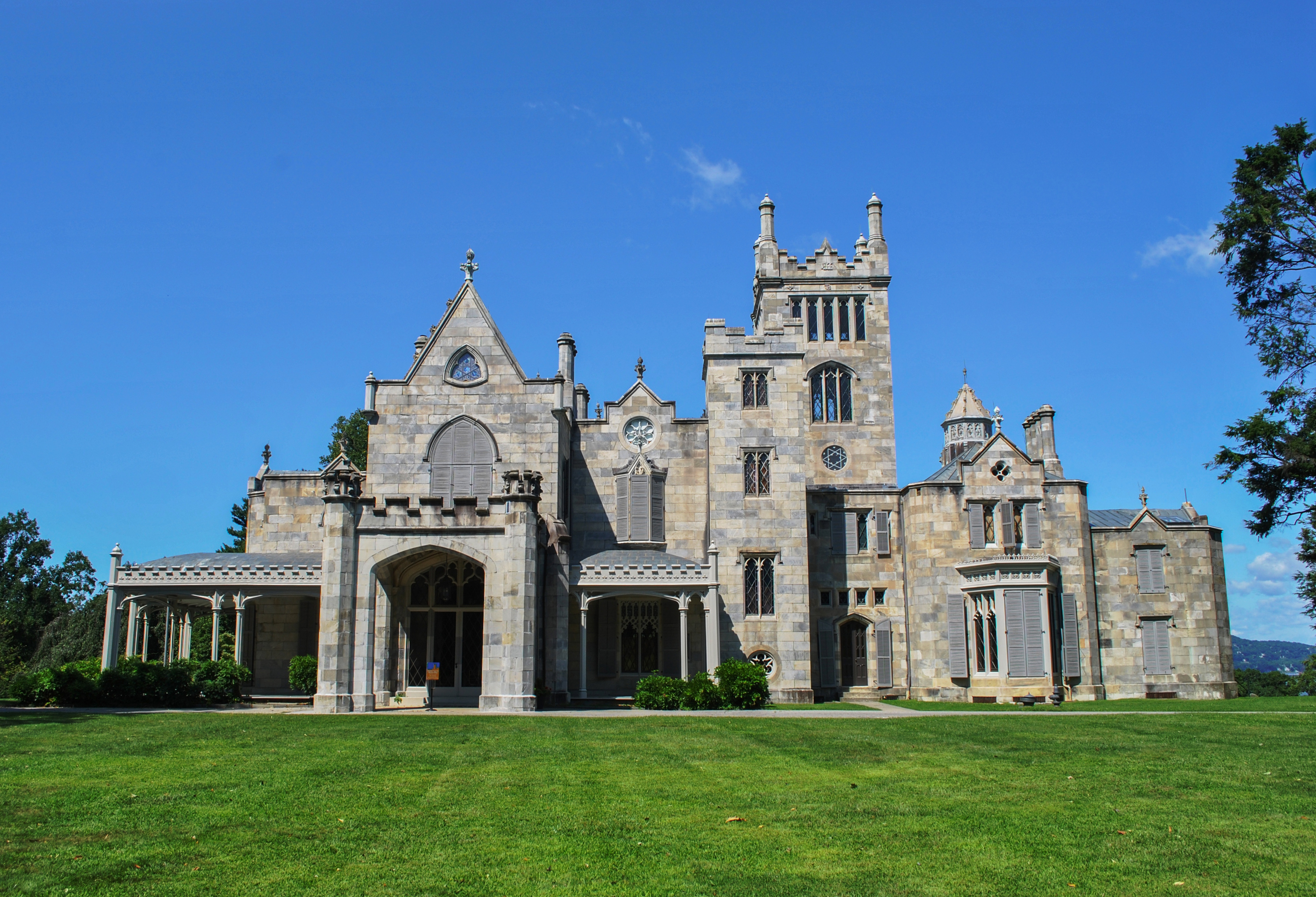
Gould purchased Lyndhurst on the east bank of the Hudson River as a country home in 1880

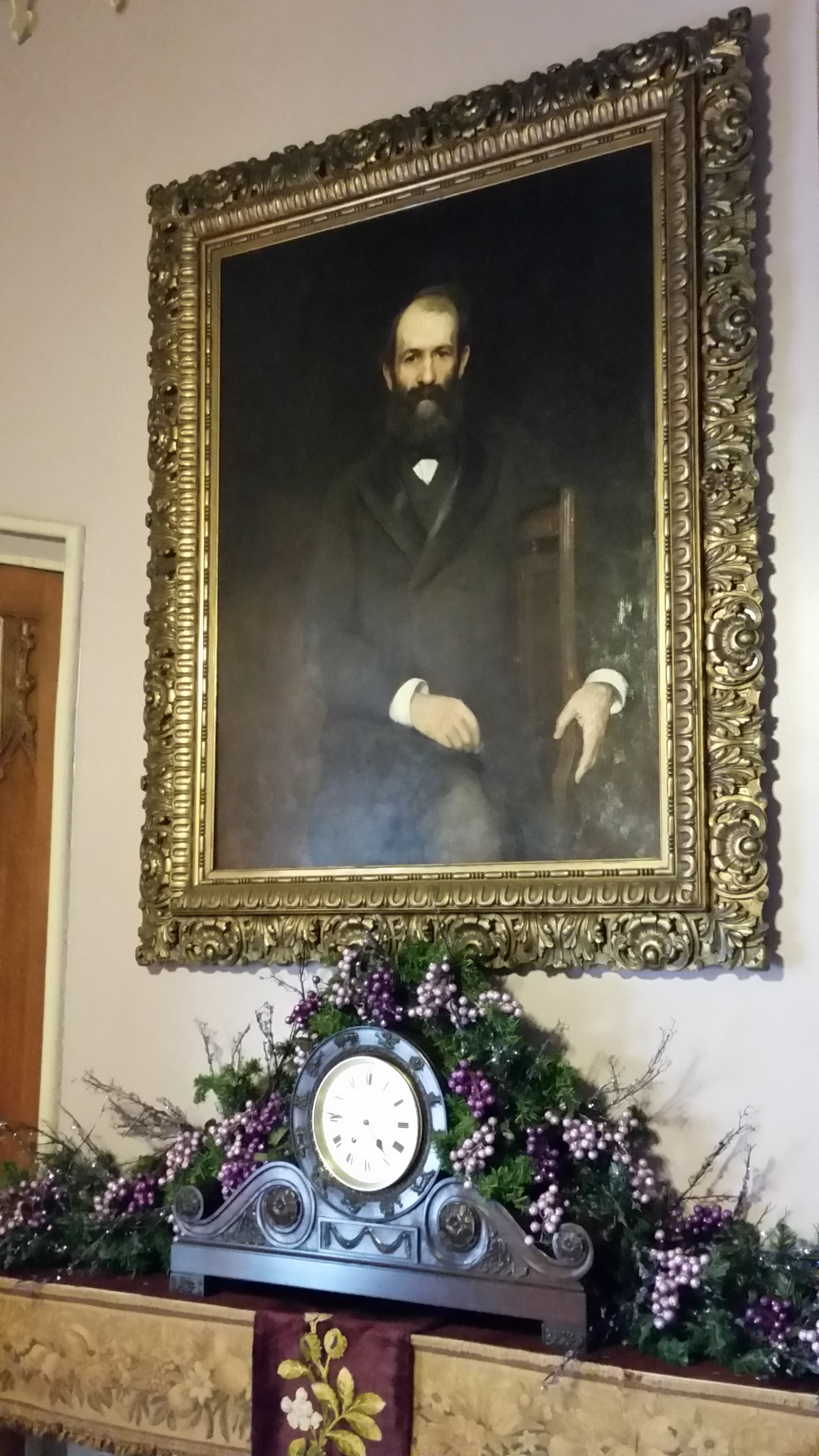
Gould's portrait hanging in his office at Lyndhurst

Gould was a member of West Presbyterian Church at 31 West 42nd Street. It later merged with Park Presbyterian to form West-Park Presbyterian.

He married Helen "Ellie" Day Miller (1838–1889) in 1863, and they had six children. Together with his son George, Gould was a founding member of the American Yacht Club. His brownstone mansion was at 579 Fifth Avenue, New York City. In 1880, he purchased the Gothic Revival mansion Lyndhurst to use as a country house. Gould took a certain measure of pride in his reputation as “the most hated man in America.” However, his notoriety made him take significant security precautions, including reinforcing the perimeter of his estate with an around-the-clock patrol of armed guards. He owned the steam yacht Atalanta, aboard which he famously commuted from Lyndhurst to work in Manhattan.

On December 2, 1892, Gould died of tuberculosis, then referred to as consumption, in his New York mansion. He was interred in the Gould family mausoleum at Woodlawn Cemetery, The Bronx, New York. For tax purposes, his fortune was conservatively estimated at $72 million (equivalent to $2.58 billion in 2025), which he willed in its entirety to his family.

At the time of his death, Gould was a benefactor in the reconstruction of the Reformed Church of Roxbury, New York (in Delaware County, eastern end of the Southern Tier), now known as the Jay Gould Memorial Reformed Church. It is located within the Main Street Historic District and was listed on the National Register of Historic Places in 1988. The reconstruction was completed by his daughter, Helen Miller Gould Shepard, a prominent philanthropist. She also fulfilled Gould's commitment to fund the construction of a New York University library, which would be named Gould Memorial Library.

== Descendants ==
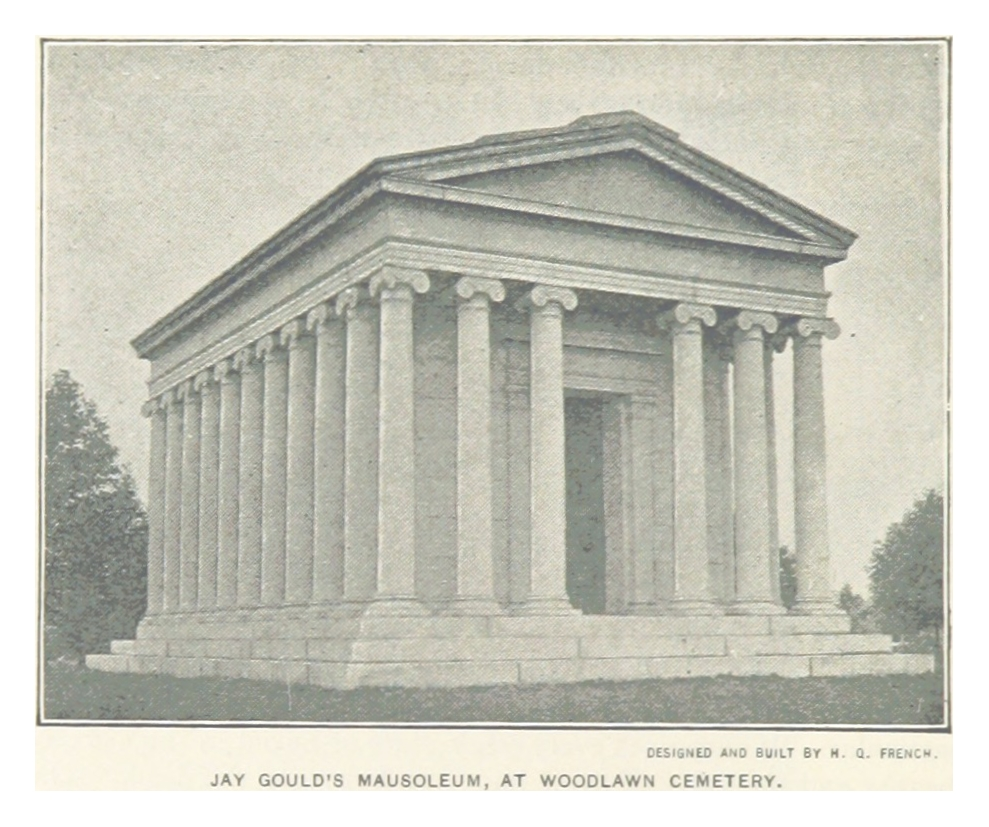
The mausoleum of Jay Gould

Gould married Helen Day Miller (1838–1889) in 1863. Their children were:

- George Jay Gould I (1864–1923), married Edith M. Kingdon (1864–1921)
  - Kingdon Gould Sr. (1887–1945), married Annunziata Camilla Maria Lucci (1890–1961)
  - Jay Gould II (1888–1935), married Anne Douglass Graham
  - Marjorie Gould (1891–1955), married Anthony Joseph Drexel III
  - Helen, Lady Decies (1893–1931), married John Graham Hope DeLaPoer Horsley Beresford (1866–1945)
  - George Jay Gould II (1896–1963), married Laura Carter
  - Edith Catherine Gould (1901–1937), married Carroll Livingston Wainwright I (1899–1967), then Sir Hector Murray MacNeal
  - Gloria Gould (1906–1943), married Henry A. Bishop II, then Walter McFarlane Barker
- Edwin Gould I (1866–1933), married Sarah Cantine Shrady
  - Edwin Gould Jr. (1894–1917), died on Jekyll Island in 1917
  - Frank Miller Gould (c. 1895–1945), married Florence Amelia Bacon, died on January 13, 1945
- Helen Miller Gould Shepard (1868–1938), married Finlay Johnson Shepard (1867–1942) They adopted three children.
- Howard Gould (1871–1959), married Viola Katherine Clemmons on October 12, 1898, then actress Grete Mosheim in 1937
- Anna, Duchess de Talleyrand-Périgord (1875–1961), married Paul Ernest Boniface, Comte de Castellane (1867–1932), then Hélie de Talleyrand-Périgord, 5th Duke of Talleyrand, 5th Duc of Dino, 4th Duke von Sagan, and Prince of Sagan (1858–1937).
  - Children with Boniface:
    - Marie Louise Boniface de Castellane (1896–?), died during infancy or early childhood
    - Antoine Boniface, Marquis de Castellane (1896–1946), married Yvonne Patenôtre
    - Georges Paul Ernest Boniface de Castellane (1897 or 1899–1944), married Florinda Fernández y Anchorena (1901–?)
    - Georges Gustave Boniface de Castellane (c. 1898–1946)
    - Jay Boniface de Castellane (1902–1956)
  - Children with Talleyrand:
    - Howard de Talleyrand, duc de Sagan (1909–1929), he killed himself when told that he could not immediately marry a girl he met in school
    - Helen Violette de Talleyrand-Périgord (1915–2003), married James Robert de Pourtales on March 29, 1937, then Gaston Palewski (1901–1984)
- Frank Jay Gould (1877–1956), married Helen Kelley; then Edith Kelly; then Florence La Caze (1895–1983)

== Criticism and appraisal ==
Gould was extensively criticized during his lifetime, on the basis that he was a trader rather than a builder of businesses, and of being unscrupulous, although more recent appraisal has suggested that his business ethics were not unusual for the time.

In an 1881 letter to Nikolai Danielson, Karl Marx referred to Gould as an "Octopodus railway king and financial swindler." Financial historian Liaquat Ahamed wrote "No one better personified the cynicism and corrupting power of Wall Street in the years following the Civil War than Gould." Describing him as a man "who had all the instincts of a master criminal" and who "became especially notorious for his carefully concocted schemes to manipulate the stocks of companies."

Anarcho-capitalist economist Murray Rothbard said that Gould's business practices were unfairly maligned, because he was supposedly one of the only railroad financiers who consistently undermined the railroad cartels' proposed rate fixing by starting new railroad lines, thus driving rates down for consumers.

== Memorials and namesakes ==
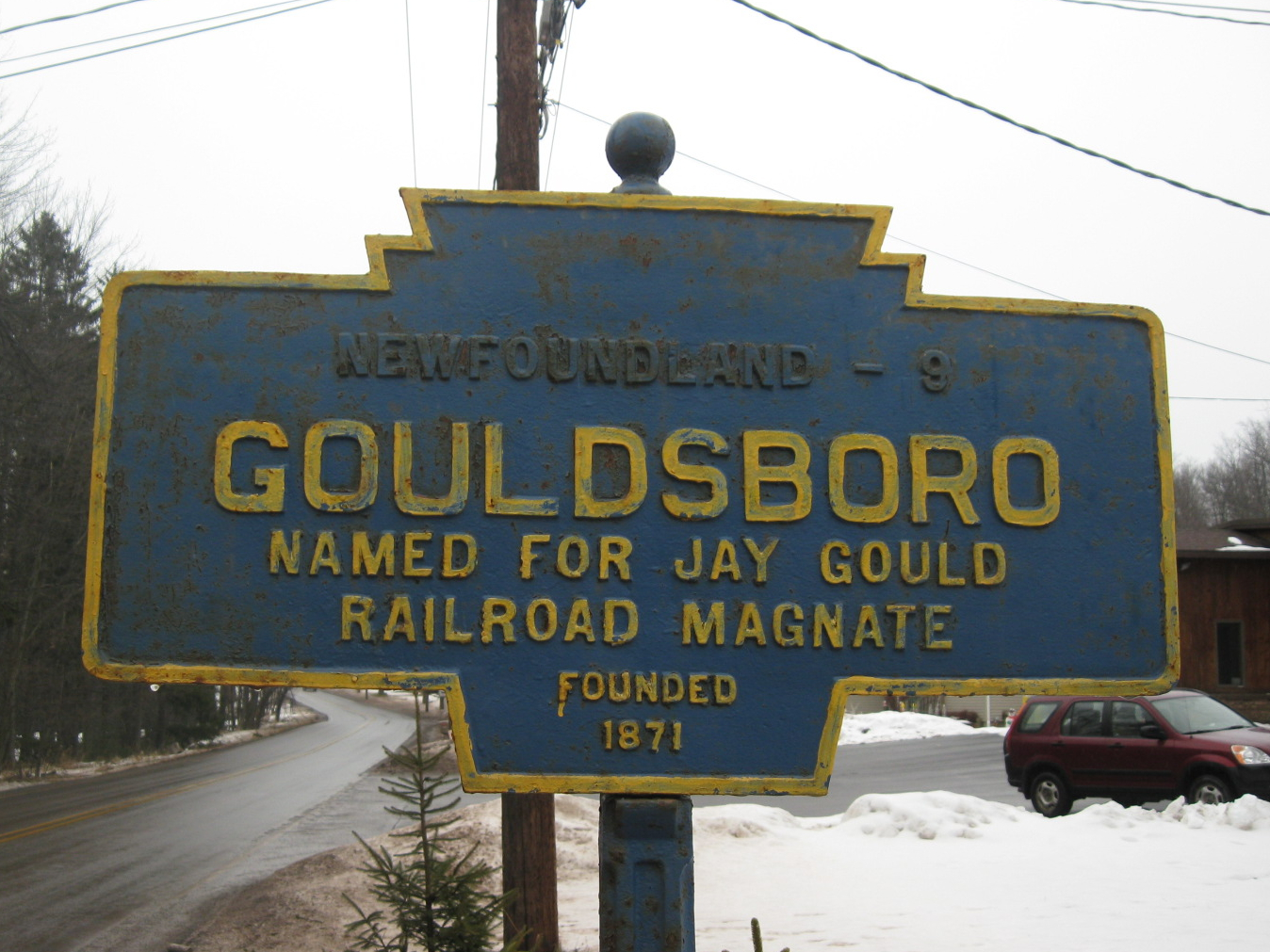
Keystone marker for Gouldsboro, Pennsylvania

Memorial Buildings

- Gould Memorial Library (Bronx Community College)
- Jay Gould Memorial Reformed Church, part of Main Street Historic District (Roxbury, New York)
- Gould Hall at Robert College in Istanbul, Turkey

Locations named after Gould

- Gouldsboro, Pennsylvania
- Gould, Ohio
- Gould, Arkansas
- Paragould, Arkansas

== In popular culture ==
- Episode of the History Channel's miniseries docudrama The Men Who Built America, featuring a portrayal of Jay Gould, was filmed at Lyndhurst in the summer of 2012.

== See also ==
- Allegheny Transportation Company
- Scottish Americans
- List of richest Americans in history
