= JMA Wireless =

American networking hardware company

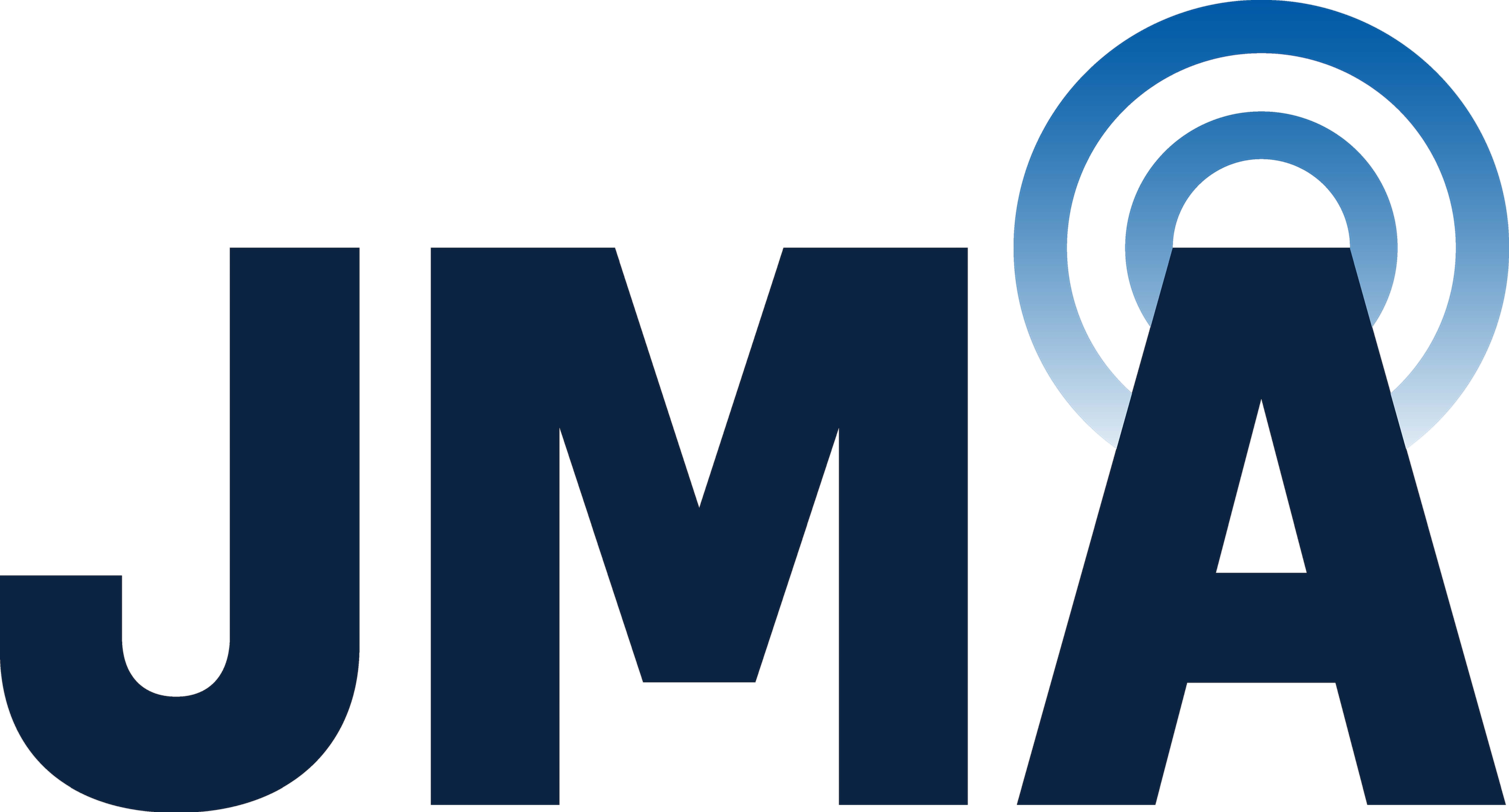
- Company type: Private
- Industry: Telecoms equipment; Networking equipment
- Founded: 2012; 14 years ago
- Founder: John Mezzalingua
- Headquarters: Syracuse, New York, U.S.
- Area served: Worldwide
- Key people: John Mezzalingua (CEO)
- Products: XRAN, IOTA, DAS
- Number of employees: 1,000 (2021)
- Website: jmawireless.com

JMA Wireless is an American wireless networking hardware manufacturing company in Syracuse, New York. It was founded in 2012 by the current chief executive officer John Mezzalingua.

It offers Open-RAN compliant 5G Radio access network (RAN) products, 5G millimeter wave products, private wireless technology hardware products, focusing on design, code, and manufacture of 4G and 5G devices in the United States. JMA Wireless created the first fully virtualized RAN for carrier and private networks as well as the first indoor 5G millimeter wave radio in the United States.

On May 19, 2022, JMA Wireless and Syracuse University announced the signing of a 10-year naming rights deal of the on-campus stadium, renaming the Carrier Dome after 42 years. The stadium was renamed as the JMA Wireless Dome, referred to as the JMA Dome.

== History ==
The company was founded in 2012 by John D. Mezzalingua as John Mezzalingua Associates LLC, initially employing about 150 people. He previously ran the Production Products Company (PPC), which was sold to Belden Incorporated for $515.7 million.

The headquarters, located in Clay, New York was expanded in 2017. In 2021, the company operated manufacturing facilities in Syracuse, with additional R&D, manufacturing, and sales staff Dallas, Austin, Chicago, Boulder, Richmond, VA, and Europe. In 2022, the company's $100 million 5G manufacturing campus was inaugurated by New York state Governor Kathy Hochul.

It is a member of the Wireless Infrastructure Association.

== Software and other technology ==
JMA Wireless operates on a software-based XRAN architecture, which integrates processes into a single common server and removes the need for radios and jumpers in Distributed antenna system (DAS) deployments.

In 2018, JMA Wireless acquired 5G radio provider PHAZR for an undisclosed amount. The deal allowed JMA Wireless to offer 5G RAN technologies that supports spectrum from 600 MHz all the way up to 47 GHz.

== Notable projects ==
JMA Wireless has deployed 5G in many large stadiums including SoFi Stadium (Los Angeles), Fiserv Forum (of the Milwaukee Bucks), Golden 1 Center (of the Sacramento Kings), JMA Wireless Dome (of Syracuse University), and other large settings, such as Carnegie Mellon University, the city of Tucson, American Dream Meadowlands, Crowne Plaza Atlanta-Midtown, and the Stadio Olimpico in Italy.
