= Grand Gorge, New York =

Hamlet in New York, United States

Coordinates: 42°21′44″N 74°29′39″W

Grand Gorge is a hamlet in the town of Roxbury, Delaware County, New York, United States. Grand Gorge has a post office with the ZIP code 12434. It was the location of the Grand Gorge Railroad Station before the railroad station was torn down.

== History ==
The hamlet was originally named Moresville after the More family, who were the first Europeans to settle there. John and Betty Taylor More emigrated from Scotland in 1772 and first settled near what is now Hobart. After being driven south to Catskill by raids during the American Revolution, the Mores returned north in 1786 and traded their original land claim for one in present-day Grand Gorge.

The family settled in the area and John More opened a tavern in their home. The tavern was at a crossroads and made a convenient stopping point, bringing them success and a reliable income. John and Betty More had eight children; John T., Robert, Alexander, Jonas, Jean, James, David, and Edward More. The descendants of the family formed the John More Association in 1890, which continues to hold reunions in nearby Roxbury every five years.

The Ulster & Delaware Railroad first reached the settlement in 1872, and in 1874 residents voted to change the community's name to Grand Gorge in order to stop mix-ups with mail meant for places like Morrisville, Mohrsville, and Moorestown.

== Demographics ==
As of the 2000 Census, Grand Gorge had a population of 663. The community was not listed as a census-designated place in 2010 and therefore did not have population statistics gathered separately from its parent town of Roxbury.
