= National Register of Historic Places listings in Delaware County, New York =

Location of Delaware County in New York

List of the National Register of Historic Places listings in Delaware County, New York

This is intended to be a complete list of properties and districts listed on the National Register of Historic Places in Delaware County, New York. The locations of National Register properties and districts (at least for all showing latitude and longitude coordinates below) may be seen in a map by clicking on "Map of all coordinates". There is just one property in the county which is further designated a National Historic Landmark, the John Burroughs Home.

This National Park Service list is complete through NPS recent listings posted August 7, 2026.

Contents: Counties in New York
Albany (Albany) – Allegany – Bronx – Broome – Cattaraugus – Cayuga – Chautauqua – Chemung – Chenango – Clinton – Columbia – Cortland – Delaware – Dutchess (Poughkeepsie, Rhinebeck) – Erie (Buffalo) – Essex – Franklin – Fulton – Genesee – Greene – Hamilton – Herkimer – Jefferson – Kings – Lewis – Livingston – Madison – Monroe (Rochester) – Montgomery – Nassau – New York (Below 14th Street, 14th to 59th Streets, 59th to 110th Streets, Above 110th Street, Islands) – Niagara (Niagara Falls) – Oneida – Onondaga (Syracuse) – Ontario – Orange – Orleans – Oswego – Otsego – Putnam – Queens – Rensselaer – Richmond – Rockland – St. Lawrence – Saratoga – Schenectady – Schoharie – Schuyler – Seneca – Steuben – Suffolk – Sullivan – Tioga – Tompkins – Ulster – Warren – Washington – Wayne – Westchester (Northern, Southern, New Rochelle, Peekskill, Yonkers) – Wyoming – Yates

== Current listings ==
	Name on the Register	Image	Date listed	Location	City or town	Description
1	Andes Historic District	Andes Historic District	June 28, 1984 (#84002215)	Delaware Ave., Main and High Sts., and Tremperskill Rd. 42°11′22″N 74°46′51″W	Andes	
2	Bloomville Methodist Episcopal Church	Bloomville Methodist Episcopal Church	November 29, 2006 (#06001080)	35 Church St. 42°19′59″N 74°48′36″W	Bloomville	
3	Bovina Center Historic District		June 2, 2000 (#00000574)	Roughly Co. Rt. 6, Creamery Rd., Maple and Pink Sts. 42°15′34″N 74°47′20″W	Bovina Center	
4	Amos Bristol Tavern	Amos Bristol Tavern	December 13, 2000 (#00001526)	Cty Rte 14; 42°20′55″N 75°00′51″W	West Meredith	
5	Burns Family Farm		May 30, 2007 (#07000486)	Crescent Valley Rd. 42°17′59″N 74°40′48″W	Bovina	
6	John Burroughs Home	John Burroughs Home	October 15, 1966 (#66000512)	2 mi. from Roxbury on Roxbury Rd. 42°17′47″N 74°35′03″W	Roxbury	A home of naturalist John Burroughs
7	Christ Episcopal Church	Christ Episcopal Church	May 18, 1999 (#99000563)	41 Gardiner Pl. 42°10′11″N 75°07′45″W	Walton	
8	Christian Church	Christian Church	March 12, 2001 (#01000250)	NY 10; 42°17′56″N 74°52′45″W	East Delhi	
9	Churchill Park Historic District		November 17, 1980 (#80004609)	NY 10 and NY 23 and W. Main St. 42°24′52″N 74°37′30″W	Stamford	
10	Common School 32	Common School 32	March 27, 2017 (#100000811)	25 Bridge St. 42°12′21″N 75°14′58″W	Trout Creek	Intact 1860 one-room schoolhouse was used until 1968
11	Congregation B'nai Israel Synagogue	Congregation B'nai Israel Synagogue	November 21, 2002 (#02001396)	Wagner Ave. 42°09′19″N 74°31′59″W	Fleischmanns	1920 synagogue is only one listed in county and only one in Catskills with exposed truss roof
12	Walter Coulter Homestead Farm		May 12, 2025 (#100011781)	615 Seedorf Road; 42°14′19″N 74°44′08″W	Bovina	
13	Delaware and Northern Railroad Station	Delaware and Northern Railroad Station	August 20, 2004 (#04000872)	Cabin Hill Rd. 42°11′14″N 74°47′21″W	Andes	
14	Delaware County Courthouse Square District	Delaware County Courthouse Square District	July 16, 1973 (#73001177)	Roughly bounded by 2nd, Church, Main, and Court Sts. 42°16′42″N 74°55′01″W	Delhi	
15	District 10 School	District 10 School	February 20, 1998 (#98000131)	NY 28, 2 mi SW of Margaretville; 42°07′20″N 74°40′32″W	Margaretville	1820s school demolished in the 1850s, reassembled in 1860. Only building left standing in Pepacton Reservoir area
16	Downsville Covered Bridge	Downsville Covered Bridge	April 29, 1999 (#99000503)	Bridge St. 42°04′34″N 74°59′28″W	Downsville	
17	First Congregational Church of Walton	First Congregational Church of Walton	July 27, 2015 (#15000476)	4 Mead St. 42°10′15″N 75°07′40″W	Walton	1840s neoclassical church has long been an important part of the village
18	First Old School Baptist Church of Roxbury and Vega Cemetery	First Old School Baptist Church of Roxbury and Vega Cemetery	April 12, 1996 (#96000371)	Near Jct. of Co. Rt. 36 and Cartwright Rd. 42°14′58″N 74°32′10″W	Roxbury	
19	First Presbyterian Church	First Presbyterian Church	February 1, 2006 (#05001616)	Clinton St. 42°16′28″N 74°55′21″W	Delhi	
20	First Presbyterian Church of Deposit	First Presbyterian Church of Deposit	December 3, 2019 (#100004734)	129 Second St. 42°03′48″N 75°25′21″W	Deposit	1880 Lawrence Valk church with auditorium plan, shared with Broome County
21	First Presbyterian Church of Margaretville	First Presbyterian Church of Margaretville	April 21, 2004 (#04000348)	169 Orchard Ave. 42°08′58″N 74°39′07″W	Margaretville	Intact 1894 late Victorian church
22	Fitches Covered Bridge	Fitches Covered Bridge	April 29, 1999 (#99000508)	Fitches Bridge Rd. 42°17′53″N 74°52′47″W	East Delhi	
23	Max and Johanna Fleischmann House	Max and Johanna Fleischmann House	August 5, 2022 (#100007958)	50 Fleischmanns Heights Rd. 42°09′11″N 74°32′50″W	Fleischmanns	
24	Franklin Village Historic District	Franklin Village Historic District	September 7, 1984 (#84002220)	Wakeman and Institute Aves., Main, Center, Maple, Water, 2nd, 3rd, and West Sts. 42°20′24″N 75°09′58″W	Franklin	
25	Judge Gideon Frisbee House	Judge Gideon Frisbee House	December 12, 1976 (#76001211)	NE of Delhi on NY 10; 42°17′57″N 74°53′29″W	Delhi	
26	Amelita Galli-Curci Estate		August 19, 2010 (#10000556)	352 and 374 Galli-Curci Road; 42°08′21″N 74°32′09″W	Fleischmanns vicinity	New listing; refnum 10000556
27	Galli-Curci Theatre	Galli-Curci Theatre	April 12, 2006 (#06000254)	801 Main St. 42°08′56″N 74°38′56″W	Margaretville	1922 movie theatre was also one of region's first car dealerships
28	Gardiner Place Historic District	Gardiner Place Historic District	May 24, 1984 (#84002222)	Gardiner Place; 42°10′08″N 75°07′43″W	Walton	
29	Hamden Covered Bridge	Hamden Covered Bridge	April 29, 1999 (#99000502)	Basin Clove Rd. 42°11′44″N 74°59′19″W	Hamden	
30	Hamden District No.1 School		December 3, 2018 (#100003152)	5594 E River Rd. 42°10′06″N 75°01′23″W	Hawleys vicinity	
31	Hanford Mill	Hanford Mill	March 26, 1973 (#73001178)	On CR 12; 42°25′47″N 74°52′16″W	East Meredith	
32	Isaac Hardenbergh House		December 12, 1994 (#94001369)	NY 23 N of jct. with William Lutz Rd. 42°20′14″N 74°27′11″W	Roxbury	
33	Hobart Masonic Hall		December 28, 2001 (#01001399)	6 Cornell Ave. 42°22′22″N 74°40′02″W	Hobart	
34	Hotel Delaware	Hotel Delaware	December 6, 2004 (#04001342)	391 Main St. 41°59′17″N 75°08′04″W	East Branch	
35	Hubbell Family Farm and Kelly's Corners Cemetery	Hubbell Family Farm and Kelly's Corners Cemetery	August 17, 2001 (#01000892)	NY 30; 42°11′25″N 74°35′40″W	Kelly's Corners	
36	Jackson-Aitken Farm	Jackson-Aitken Farm	February 20, 2003 (#03000044)	3240 Fall Clove Rd. 42°09′28″N 74°52′10″W	Andes	
37	Kelly Round Barn	Kelly Round Barn	September 29, 1984 (#84003857)	NY 30; 42°12′01″N 74°35′48″W	Halcottsville	
38	Lordville Presbyterian Church	Lordville Presbyterian Church	February 4, 2000 (#00000052)	Lordville Rd. 41°52′11″N 75°12′57″W	Lordville	
39	Lower Shavertown Covered Bridge	Lower Shavertown Covered Bridge	April 29, 1999 (#99000504)	682 Methol Rd. 41°55′24″N 75°00′49″W	Methol	
40	MacDonald Farm	MacDonald Farm	April 3, 1973 (#73001179)	Elk Creek and Monroe Rds. 42°21′14″N 74°51′44″W	Meredith	
41	Main Street Historic District	Main Street Historic District	February 29, 1988 (#88000111)	Main St. 42°17′22″N 74°33′44″W	Roxbury	
42	Maxbilt Theatre	Maxbilt Theatre	December 10, 2014 (#14001019)	932 Main St. 42°09′22″N 74°31′58″W	Fleischmanns	Small regional theater built in 1929 by Russian immigrant who went on to become a major regional developer during Catskill resort era; soon to be renovated into dinner theater
43	McArthur-Martin Hexadecagon Barn	McArthur-Martin Hexadecagon Barn	September 29, 1984 (#84002237)	McArthur Hill Rd. 42°22′18″N 74°46′51″W	Bloomville	
44	McNaught Family Farm	McNaught Family Farm	August 8, 2019 (#100004241)	289 McNaught Hill Road; 42°18′00″N 74°44′30″W	Bovina Center	Early 19th-century farmstead established by family of Scottish immigrants displaced by the Lowland Clearances
45	Mountain Athletic Club Grounds		October 29, 2020 (#100005706)	Wagner Ave. and Ballpark Ave. 42°09′19″N 74°32′03″W	Fleischmanns	
46	Murray Hill	Murray Hill	June 3, 1982 (#82003354)	Murray Hill Rd. 42°16′35″N 74°54′16″W	Delhi	
47	New Kingston Historic District		February 19, 2008 (#08000037)	Co. Rd. 6; 42°12′53″N 74°40′53″W	New Kingston	
48	New Kingston Presbyterian Church	New Kingston Presbyterian Church	May 22, 2002 (#02000554)	CR 6; 42°12′48″N 74°40′57″W	New Kingston	
49	New Stone Hall	New Stone Hall	May 6, 1980 (#80002600)	Center St. 42°20′20″N 75°10′06″W	Franklin	
50	North Harpersfield Churches	North Harpersfield Churches	May 10, 2024 (#100010271)	4289 and 4298 County Road 29; 42°28′24″N 74°41′24″W	Harpersfield	
51	Old School Baptist Church of Halcottsville	Old School Baptist Church of Halcottsville	July 8, 1999 (#99000809)	Old NY 30; 42°12′25″N 74°36′05″W	Halcottsville	
52	Pakatakan Artists Colony Historic District	Pakatakan Artists Colony Historic District	February 21, 1989 (#89000046)	NY 28 at jct. with Dry Brook Rd. 42°08′33″N 74°37′30″W	Arkville	
53	Pioneer Cemetery	Pioneer Cemetery	July 24, 2007 (#07000754)	Main St. 42°18′59″N 75°23′39″W	Sidney	
54	Ravina		February 4, 2000 (#00000048)	Bouchouxville; 41°52′16″N 75°12′28″W	Lordville	
55	Rock Rift Fire Observation Tower	Rock Rift Fire Observation Tower	December 7, 2018 (#100003231)	Tower Lane; 42°06′14″N 75°13′36″W	Tompkins vicinity	1934 fire tower in original state, staffed until 1987
56	Rock Valley School	Rock Valley School	May 12, 2008 (#08000406)	9598 Rock Valley Rd. 41°53′33″N 75°05′04″W	Rock Valley	(new listing; refnum 08000406)
57	St. John's Church Complex	St. John's Church Complex	July 21, 1995 (#95000879)	136 Main St. 42°16′45″N 74°55′00″W	Delhi	
58	St. Peter's Episcopal Church Complex	St. Peter's Episcopal Church Complex	July 31, 1998 (#98000948)	Jct. of Pine and Church Sts. 42°22′13″N 74°40′13″W	Hobart	
59	Schoolhouse No. 5	Schoolhouse No. 5	June 1, 2011 (#11000326)	5942 Dunk Hill Rd. 42°16′05″N 75°05′08″W	Hamden vicinity	New listing; refnum 11000326
60	Second Old School Baptist Church of Roxbury	Second Old School Baptist Church of Roxbury	July 28, 1999 (#99000908)	Cty. Rd. 41; 42°15′53″N 74°35′43″W	Roxbury	
61	Second Walton Armory (33rd Separate Company)	Second Walton Armory (33rd Separate Company)	September 6, 2016 (#16000591)	139 Stockton Ave. 42°09′58″N 75°07′50″W	Walton	1890s armory by Isaac Perry now known as Castle on the Delaware, used as restaurant, events center
62	Erskine L. Seeley House	Erskine L. Seeley House	August 30, 2010 (#10000593)	46 Main St. 42°24′28″N 74°36′48″W	Stamford	New listing; refnum 10000593
63	Sherwood Family Estate		December 31, 2002 (#02001648)	484 Sherwood Rd. 42°15′50″N 74°56′03″W	Delhi	
64	Sidney Historic District	Sidney Historic District	September 4, 2013 (#13000679)	Railroad Ave., River, Bridge & Main Sts. 42°18′57″N 75°23′42″W	Sidney	
65	Skene Memorial Library	Skene Memorial Library	May 30, 2001 (#01000576)	Main St.-Old NY 28; 42°09′19″N 74°31′46″W	Fleischmanns	Queen Anne/Shingle Style Carnegie library built by Alexander Skene's widow in his memory in 1901
66	Walter Stratton House	Walter Stratton House	December 31, 2002 (#02001660)	New Kingston Mountain Rd. 42°15′21″N 74°37′00″W	Roxbury	
67	Thomson Family Farm		September 15, 2004 (#04001000)	Thomson Hollow Rd. 42°16′03″N 74°38′03″W	New Kingston	
68	Ulster and Delaware Railroad Depot and Mill Complex	Ulster and Delaware Railroad Depot and Mill Complex	April 18, 2003 (#03000254)	Depot St. 42°17′04″N 74°34′11″W	Roxbury	
69	Union Free School	Union Free School	December 6, 2004 (#04001345)	28218 NY 206; 42°04′59″N 74°59′53″W	Downsville	
70	United Presbyterian Church of Davenport	United Presbyterian Church of Davenport	July 24, 2017 (#100001360)	15673 & 15705 NY 23; 42°28′13″N 74°50′52″W	Davenport	1868 Greek Revival church with features from 1890s Victorian renovation; now Charlotte Valley Presbyterian
71	US Post Office-Delhi	US Post Office-Delhi	November 17, 1988 (#88002477)	10 Court St. 42°16′40″N 74°55′07″W	Delhi	
72	US Post Office-Walton	US Post Office-Walton	May 11, 1989 (#88002439)	34-36 Gardner Pl. 42°10′09″N 75°07′42″W	Walton	
73	Van Benschoten House and Guest House	Van Benschoten House and Guest House	April 1, 2002 (#02000302)	Margaretville Mountain Rd. 42°10′02″N 74°40′08″W	Margaretville	
74	Walton Grange 1454-Former Armory	Walton Grange 1454-Former Armory	June 22, 1998 (#98000666)	57 Stockton Ave. 42°09′56″N 75°07′50″W	Walton	1886 armory later used as Grange hall, school and clubhouse
75	West Delhi Presbyterian Church, Manse, and Cemetery	West Delhi Presbyterian Church, Manse, and Cemetery	November 7, 2008 (#08001032)	18 and 45 Sutherland Rd. 42°18′00″N 75°00′25″W	West Delhi	New listing; refnum#08001032
76	West Kortright Presbyterian Church	West Kortright Presbyterian Church	November 15, 2002 (#02001326)	49 W. Kortright Church Rd. 42°24′08″N 74°51′08″W	West Kortright	
77	West Meredith Cemetery	West Meredith Cemetery	November 7, 2003 (#03001119)	Cty Rte. 14; 42°20′48″N 75°01′36″W	West Meredith	

== See also ==
- National Register of Historic Places listings in New York
- List of New York State Historic Markers in Delaware County, New York
