= Old School Baptist Church of Halcottsville =

Historic church in New York, United States

- U.S. National Register of Historic Places
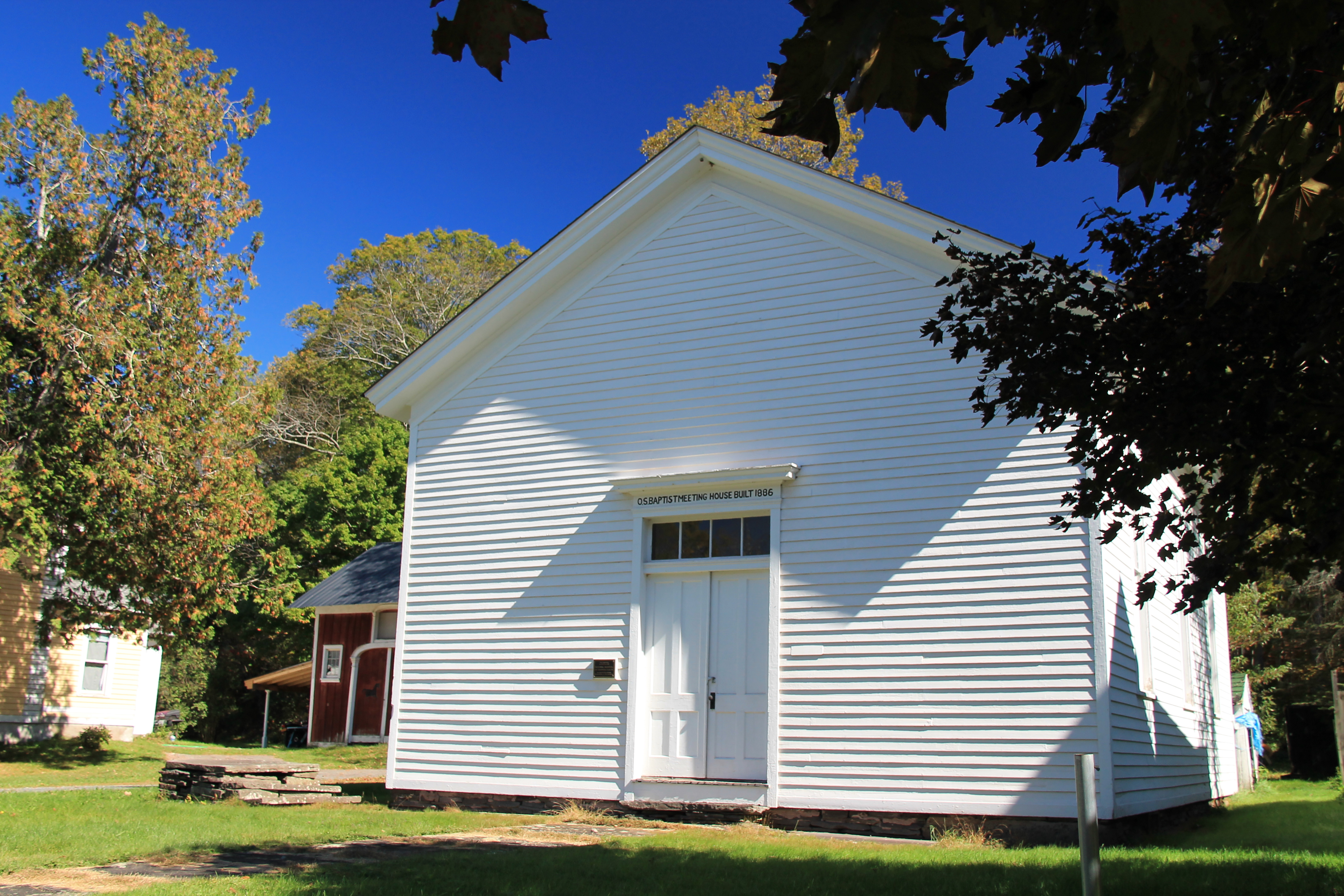

- Location within New York Location within the United States
- Location: Old NY 30, Halcottsville, New York
- Coordinates: 42°12′25″N 74°36′5″W
- Area: less than one acre
- Built: 1886
- Architectural style: Greek Revival
- NRHP reference No.: 99000809
- Added to NRHP: July 8, 1999

Old School Baptist Church of Halcottsville is a historic Baptist church building on Old NY 30 in Halcottsville, Delaware County, New York. It is a one-story, wood-frame building constructed in 1886 by Eld. Isaac Hewitt as a branch of the Second Old School Baptist Church of Roxbury. The interior features a traditional meeting house plan.

It was added to the National Register of Historic Places in 1999.

== See also ==
- Olive and Hurley Old School Baptist Church
- Second Old School Baptist Church of Roxbury
- First Old School Baptist Church of Roxbury
- National Register of Historic Places listings in Delaware County, New York
