= Wawaka =

Wawaka may refer to several locations in the United States:

- Wawaka, Indiana
- Wawaka Lake
