= Stephen Dodd Law =

American politician

Stephen Dodd Law (June 25, 1820 – October 22, 1886) was an American lawyer and writer.

== Biography ==
Law, fourth son of Samuel Andrew Law, who graduated from Yale College in 1792, and Sarah Sherman Law, was born in Meredith, Delaware County, New York, June 25, 1820.

He graduated from Yale in 1841. After his graduation, he taught an academy for a while, was town clerk of Meredith, captain of militia, etc. He studied law at Delhi, New York, and at Albany, New York was admitted as solicitor and counselor in chancery in June, 1845, and as Attorney at law in January, 1846. He commenced practicing in Albany, but in 1848 removed his office to New York City. In July, 1848, he went to Washington, D. C, as Law-clerk in the office of the Solicitor of the Treasury; but in 1849 returned to New York, where he continued to practice law, making a specialty of patent cases, until the time of his death.

In 1852 he published a Treatise on the Jurisdiction of the United States Courts; in 1862, a Digest of all Cases decided in the American Courts in respect to Copyright, Patents for Inventions, and Trademarks; and in 1866, The Statute Laws of the United States respecting Copyrights and Patents for Inventions. New editions of the last two works have been frequently printed. He gave much attention to the study of the works of Shakespeare, and wrote several articles on the plays and characters of that poet, some of which it is intended to publish. His collection of books was quite large, and related mostly to editions of Shakespeare and works respecting that author. He was fond of his books, and when at home in the country spent most of his time in his library. He resided in Brooklyn, before 1869, and after that date in Tarrytown.

He died at his home in Tarrytown, October 22, 1886, in his 67th year.

He married, December 22, 1851, Josephine Tewksbury, of Philadelphia, who died March 22, 1859. He had two sons, of whom the younger died in infancy; his elder son, named James Tewksbury Law (1852–1917), practiced law with his father in New York, but died unmarried and without issue. His posthumous portrait was painted by Carl Ludwig Brandt in 1893.
