= Murray Hill (Delhi, New York) =

Historic house in New York, United States

- U.S. National Register of Historic Places
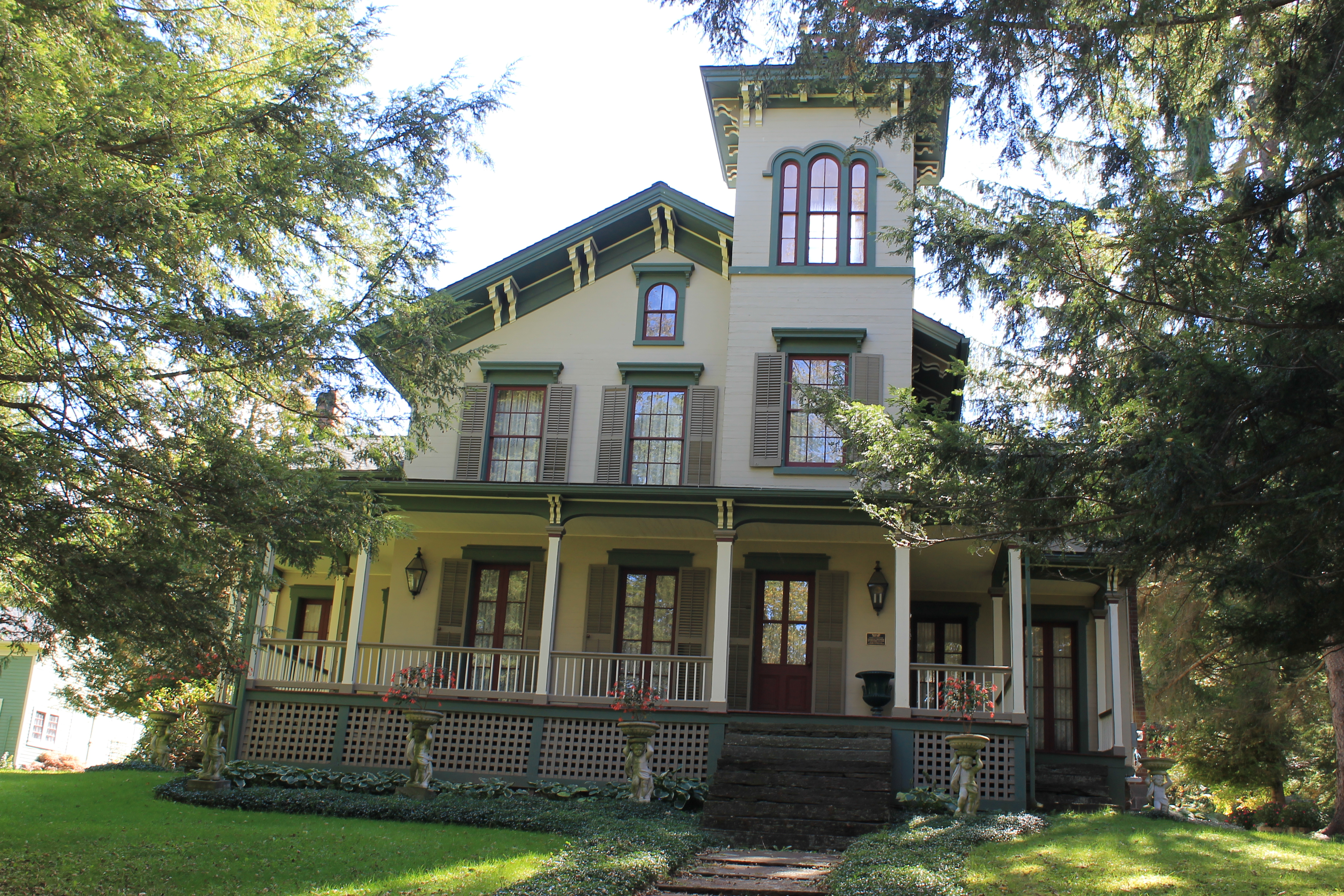
- Murray Hill House in Delhi Village

- Location within New York Location within the United States
- Location: Murray Hill Rd., Delhi, New York
- Coordinates: 42°16′35″N 74°54′16″W
- Area: 78 acres (32 ha)
- Built: 1867
- Architectural style: Italianate
- NRHP reference No.: 82003354
- Added to NRHP: June 3, 1982

Murray Hill is a historic home located at Delhi in Delaware County, New York, United States. It was built in 1867 and is a frame building with an irregular plan in the Italian Villa style. It consists of a two-story, ell-shaped main block with lower wings extending from the south side and rear. It features a three-story tower above the main entrance with a one-story porch extending across the front. Also on the property is a two-story tenant house and a barn.

It was listed on the National Register of Historic Places in 1982.

== See also ==
- National Register of Historic Places listings in Delaware County, New York
