= Amos Bristol Tavern =

- U.S. National Register of Historic Places
- Location within New York Location within the United States
- Location: Cty Rte 14, West Meredith, New York
- Coordinates: 42°20′55″N 75°0′51″W
- Area: 11 acres (4.5 ha)
- Built: 1800
- Architect: Bristol, John
- Architectural style: Federal
- NRHP reference No.: 00001526
- Added to NRHP: December 13, 2000

Amos Bristol Tavern is a historic inn and tavern located at West Meredith in Delaware County, New York, United States. It was built about 1800 and is a two-story, five bay building of post and beam construction with wooden plank walls. It sits on a fieldstone foundation and is clad with narrow wooden clapboards.

It was listed on the National Register of Historic Places in 2000.

== See also ==
- National Register of Historic Places listings in Delaware County, New York
