= Thomson Family Farm =

- U.S. National Register of Historic Places
- U.S. Historic district
- Location within New York Location within the United States
- Nearest city: New Kingston, New York
- Coordinates: 42°16′3″N 74°38′3″W
- Area: 90 acres (36 ha)
- Built: 1820
- NRHP reference No.: 04001000
- Added to NRHP: September 15, 2004

Thomson Family Farm is a historic farm complex and national historic district located at New Kingston in Delaware County, New York. The district contains two contributing buildings, five contributing sites, and two contributing structures. It includes the farmhouse dating to 1835-1840; dairy barn; horse barn, wood shop, and sheep barn foundations; granary site; and water power system.

It was listed on the National Register of Historic Places in 2004.

== See also ==
- National Register of Historic Places listings in Delaware County, New York
