= Olive and Hurley Old School Baptist Church =

Historic church in New York, United States

Olive & Hurley Church
- Olive and Hurley Old School Baptist Church
- Olive & Hurley Church
- Denomination: Primitive Baptist

History
- Former name(s): Baptist Church of Christ at Tongore; First Baptist Church in Marbletown; First Baptist Church of Olive; Union Baptist Church of Olive and Hurley
- Founded: September 6, 1799

Architecture
- Groundbreaking: 1856
- Completed: 1857
- Construction cost: $1,650

Administration
- Division: Warwick Baptist Assoc. Lexington Baptist Assoc. Roxbury O.S. Baptist Assoc. Lexington-Roxbury O.S. Baptist Assoc.

Clergy
- Pastor(s): Eld. William Connelly; Eld. William Warren; Eld. Jonathan Van Velsen; Eld. Almiron St. John; Eld. Isaac Hewitt; Eld. Jacob Winchell; Eld. John Davis Hubbell; Eld. John Clark; Eld. John Burroughs Slauson; Eld. George Ruston; Eld. Arnold Hill Bellows; Eld. Amasa J. Slauson
- Olive and Hurley Old School Baptist Church
- U.S. National Register of Historic Places
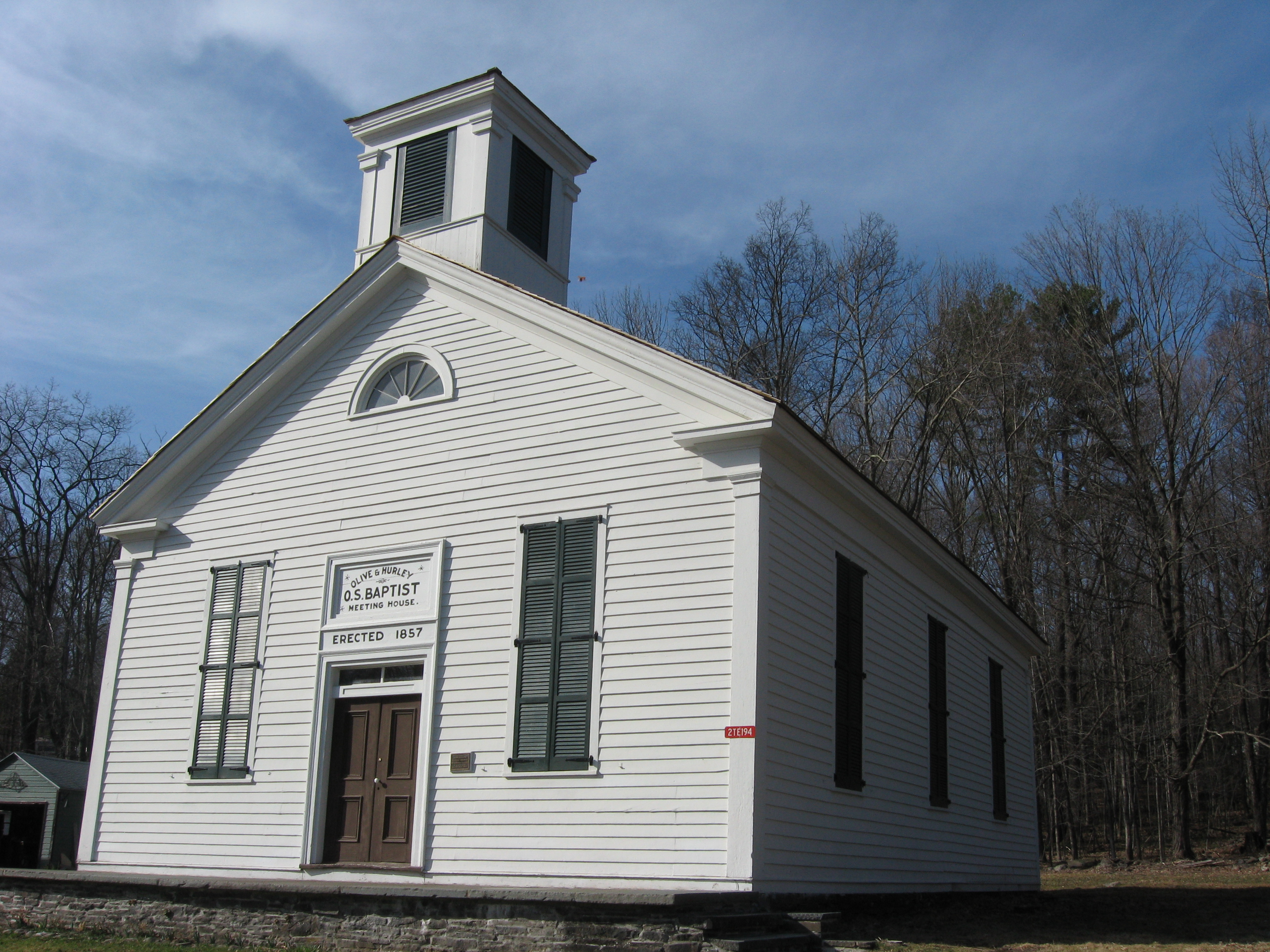
- South elevation and west profile, 2010

- Location within New York Location within the United States
- Location: NY 28, jct. with NY 30, Shokan, New York
- Coordinates: 41°58′24″N 74°12′45″W
- Area: 0.5 acres (0.20 ha)
- Built: 1857
- Architectural style: Greek Revival
- NRHP reference No.: 98001392
- Added to NRHP: November 19, 1998

Olive and Hurley Old School Baptist Church is an historic Baptist meeting house on NY Route 28, at the junction with Ulster County Route 30 in Shokan, New York. It was built in 1857 and added to the National Register of Historic Places in 1998.

== History ==
On September 2, 1799, the first Baptist church in Ulster County was constituted at Tongore (now in the Town of Olive). Dr. William Connelly, a pioneer physician in the area, served as the first pastor.

By 1805, the church was known as the First Baptist Church of Christ in Marbletown and later the First Baptist Church of Olive. The first Meeting House was erected in Olive City in 1808.

By the 1830s, the once homogenous Baptist denomination in America was rapidly fracturing over issues of doctrine, salaried ministry, instrumental music, and the Baptist Board of Foreign Missions. The Olive Church, by then one of several Baptist churches in Ulster County (i.e. Lattingtown – 1812, Kingston – 1832), took a stand with the conservative faction, which became known as the Old-School or Primitive Baptists, who sought to maintain the old doctrines and practices.

In 1851, the Baptist Church of Olive and the Hurley & Olive Baptist Church (which had been formed after an earlier split with the Olive Church), reunited as the Union Baptist Church of Olive & Hurley. In 1853, the enlarged congregation called for the ordination of Deacon Jacob Winchell to the position of Elder. A Presbytery (attended incidentally by Chauncy Burroughs, father of John Burroughs as a representative from the Second Roxbury Church) determined the candidate's qualifications. Upon examination, Jacob Winchell was ordained and served as pastor until his death in 1867. He was the first native Olive resident to serve in that capacity.

By the mid-1850s, the old Meeting House in Olive was found inadequate. Plans were laid for building a larger structure. In 1856, a site was selected on part of the DuBois family holdings, which was on the north side of Plank Road (now State Route 28). This is the present site of the Meeting House, which is now located at Winchell's Corner in the heart of the village of Shokan. In May 1856, the lot was surveyed at the request of Jeremiah Matthews and Samuel H. Elmendorf, both of Olive village, and soon work was begun on the new building. In 1857, the church edifice was completed at a cost of $1,650.

In 1888, the Church was incorporated under the name of The Old School Baptist Church of Olive and Hurley. At that time, membership was approximately 120.

The congregation remained strong until the turn of the 20th-Century, after which the church began a slow decline. By the Second World War, membership stood at around thirty. Today, the congregation is gone, but the building remains as a testament to its pioneer heritage. Services are held annually in the Fall.

== Restoration efforts ==
1998

- A grass roots effort was begun by local volunteers to restore the historic Meeting House began.
- The building and surrounding property were listed on the New York State & National Registers of Historic Places.

1999

- The Church was awarded a $4,400 grant from t he Preservation League of New York State. The grant covered the cost of a Conditions Survey of the Meeting House.
- The Church was awarded a $7,000 matching grant by the “Sacred Sites Program” of the New York Landmarks Conservancy. This grant was applied toward replacement of the building's roof and reconstruction of the belfry.
- The Town of Olive Archives (with untold hours of volunteer work) published “Country Tears – City Water” – the first multimedia production of its kind in this area. All proceeds from the sale of the CD-ROM were applied toward restoration of the Meeting House.
- The belfry completely rebuilt and roof replaced.
- The Blue & Yellow Historical Marker was dedicated by the Historical Society of the Town of Olive. Marker donated by Chester A. “Chet” Lyons Jr.

2000

- Eagle Scout candidate Scott B. Kanvin of Boy Scout Troop 66, lead a restoration of the old privy and clean-up of the church property.

2006–2007

- Most foundation sills were replaced. Broken concrete slabs were removed from front porch. Porch reinforced with concrete.

2009

- Interior walls and ceiling restored (walls repainted to match original salmon color.)
- A new cedar roof and new reproduction shutters installed.
- New, massive blue stone slabs from a local quarry installed on front porch.

2010

- Hand rails added. Major renovations completed.

== See also ==
- National Register of Historic Places listings in Ulster County, New York
- 1689 Baptist Confession of Faith
