= Hancock Middle/High School =

School in Hancock, New York, United States

Location
- 67 Education Lane; Hancock, Delaware County, New York 13783; United States
- Coordinates: 41.95666°N 75.280946°W

Information
- School type: Public school (government funded), combined middle school and high school
- Status: Open
- School district: Hancock Central School District
- NCES District ID: 3613560
- CEEB code: 332260
- NCES School ID: 361356001110
- Principal: julie bergman
- Teaching staff: 26.67 (FTE)
- Grades: 5-12
- Enrollment: 203 (2023-2024)
- Student to teacher ratio: 7.61
- Colors: Blue and white
- Mascot: Wildcat
- Website: hancock.stier.org

Hancock Middle/High School is located in Hancock, New York, United States. It is the single high school for the Hancock Central School District.
