= Clark L. Hood =

American politician (1847–1920)

Clark L. Hood (June 23, 1847 – November 19, 1920) was an American politician and lawyer.

Born in the town of Hancock, New York, Hood was educated at the Delaware Literary Institute. He then fought in the Union Army during the American Civil War. Hood then studied law in Binghamton, New York and was admitted to the New York bar in 1869. Hood moved to La Crosse, Wisconsin and continued to practice law. Hood served as La Crosse city attorney and as Crosse County district attorney. He also served on the La Crosse Common Council and was a Democrat. In 1913, Hood served in the Wisconsin State Assembly. He died in a hospital in La Crosse, Wisconsin.
