= Point Mountain Mausoleum =

Former burial site in Delaware County, New York

Coordinates: 41.949°N 75.282°W

Point Mountain Mausoleum is an abandoned mausoleum at the top of Point Mountain in Hancock, New York, overlooking the Delaware River and neighboring Pennsylvania. It was built as the memorial and final resting spot of Dr. Lester E. Woolsey (1872–1962) in the 1940s. Woolsey was a longtime Delaware County coroner who had practiced medicine in Hancock since 1901. Woolsey was buried there only a few years, but the structure could not be properly protected, and all the bodies that were entombed there were removed. Dr. Woolsey's remains were removed to Old Colonial Mausoleum, Union Dale, Pennsylvania.
