= Judge Gideon Frisbee House =

Historic house in New York, United States

- U.S. National Register of Historic Places
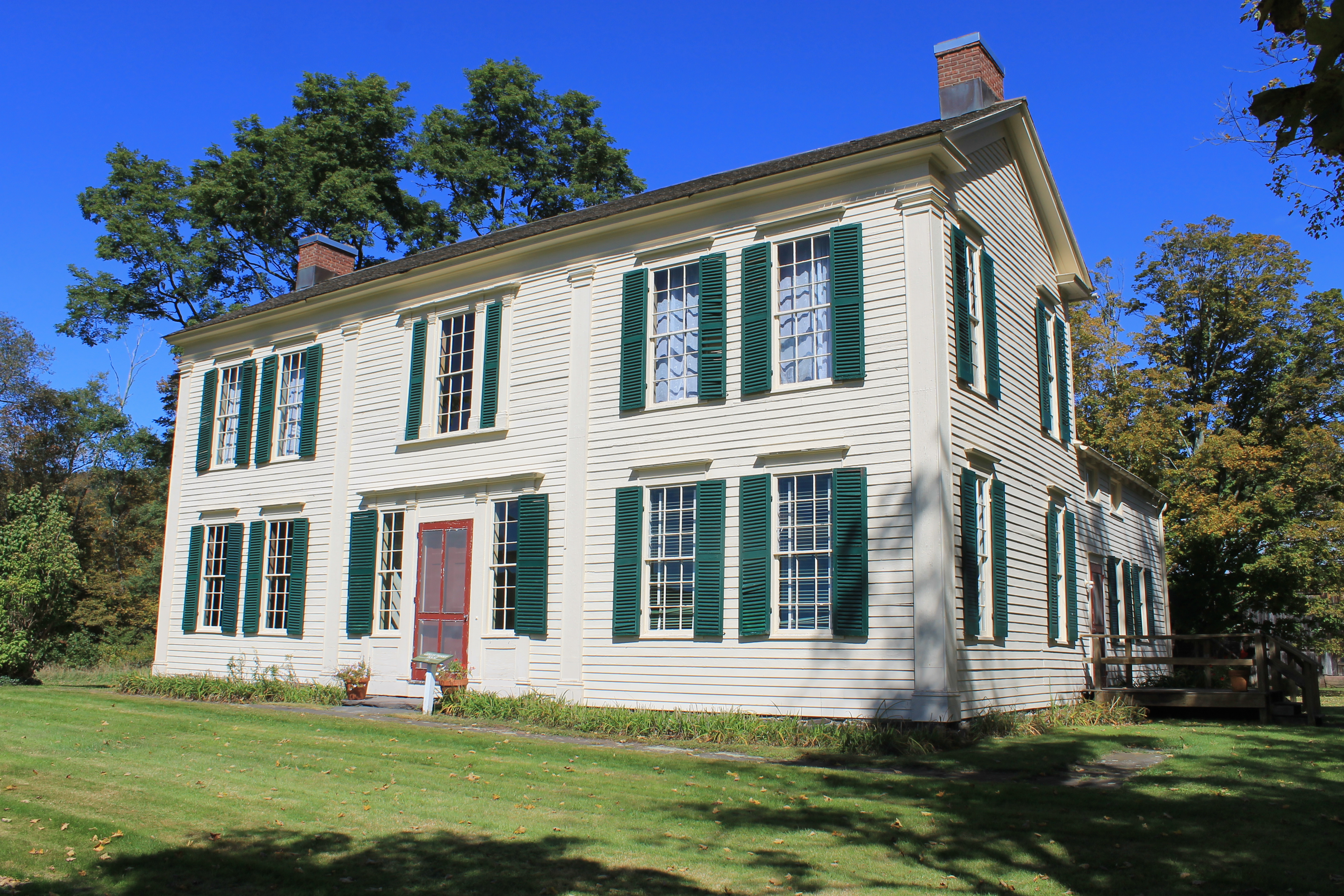
- Judge Gideon Frisbee House

- Location within New York Location within the United States
- Nearest city: Delhi, New York
- Coordinates: 42°17′57″N 74°53′29″W
- Area: less than one acre
- Built: 1798
- Architectural style: Federal
- NRHP reference No.: 76001211
- Added to NRHP: December 12, 1976

Judge Gideon Frisbee House is a historic home located at Delhi in Delaware County, New York, United States. It was built around 1798 and consists of a two-story, clapboarded, rectangular-frame main section with a 1 1/2-story rear wing. The house is in the Federal style. It serves as headquarters of the Delaware County Historical Association.

It was listed on the National Register of Historic Places in 1976.

== See also ==
- National Register of Historic Places listings in Delaware County, New York
