= Lower Shavertown Bridge =

- Lower Shavertown Covered Bridge
- U.S. National Register of Historic Places
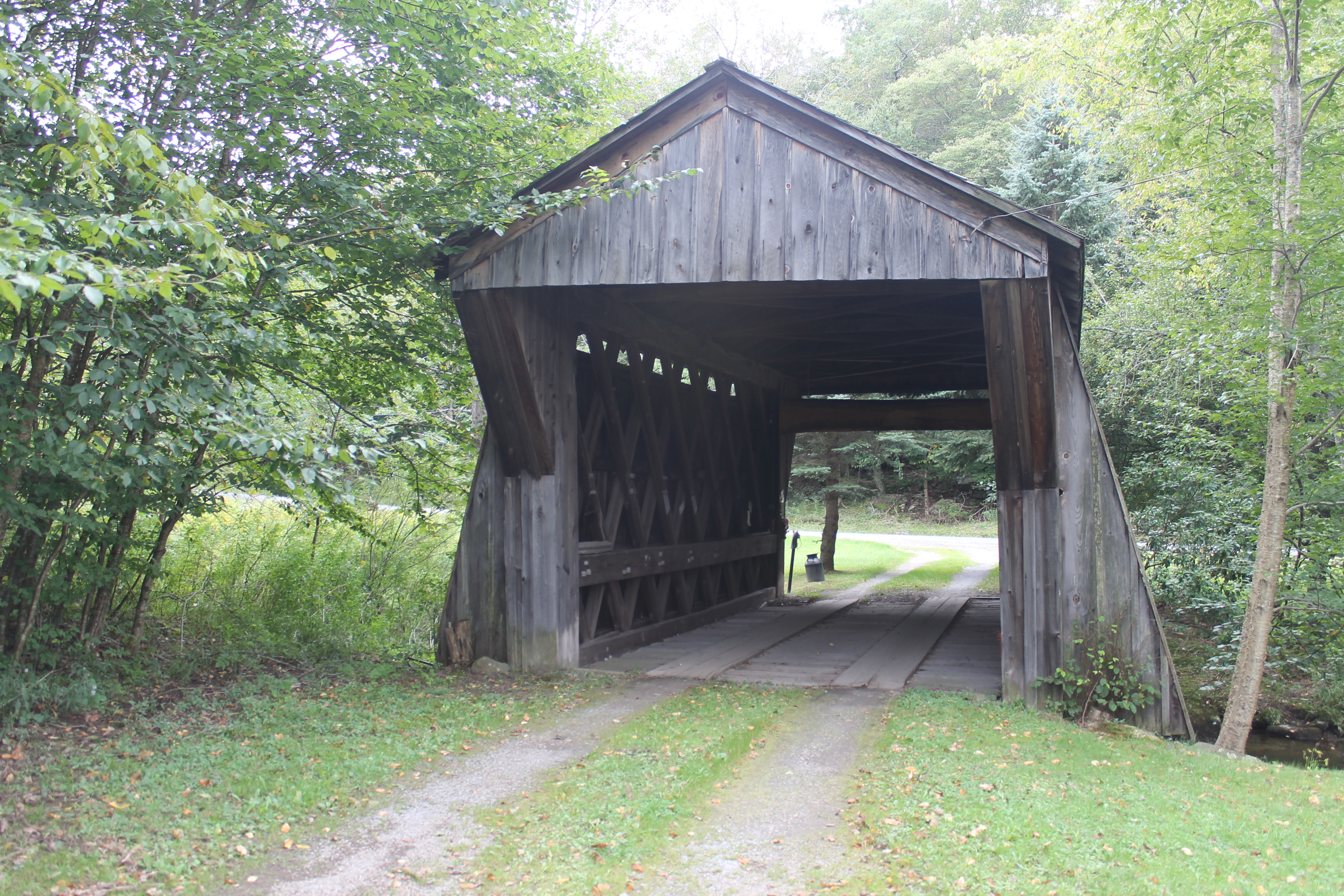

- Location within New York Location within the United States
- Location: 682 Methol Road, Methol, New York
- Coordinates: 41°55′24″N 75°0′49″W
- Area: less than one acre
- Built: 1877
- Architect: Jenkins, Anson; Neidig, Augustus
- NRHP reference No.: 99000504
- Added to NRHP: April 29, 1999

Lower Shavertown Bridge is a wooden covered bridge over Trout Creek in the town of Hancock in Delaware County, New York, U.S. It was originally erected in the hamlet of Shaverton in 1877 as a crossing of Lower Beech Hill Brook, and moved to its present location at Methol in 1954. It is 32 feet long and is a wood-plank-framed, gable-roofed, single-span bridge. It is one of 29 covered bridges in New York State.

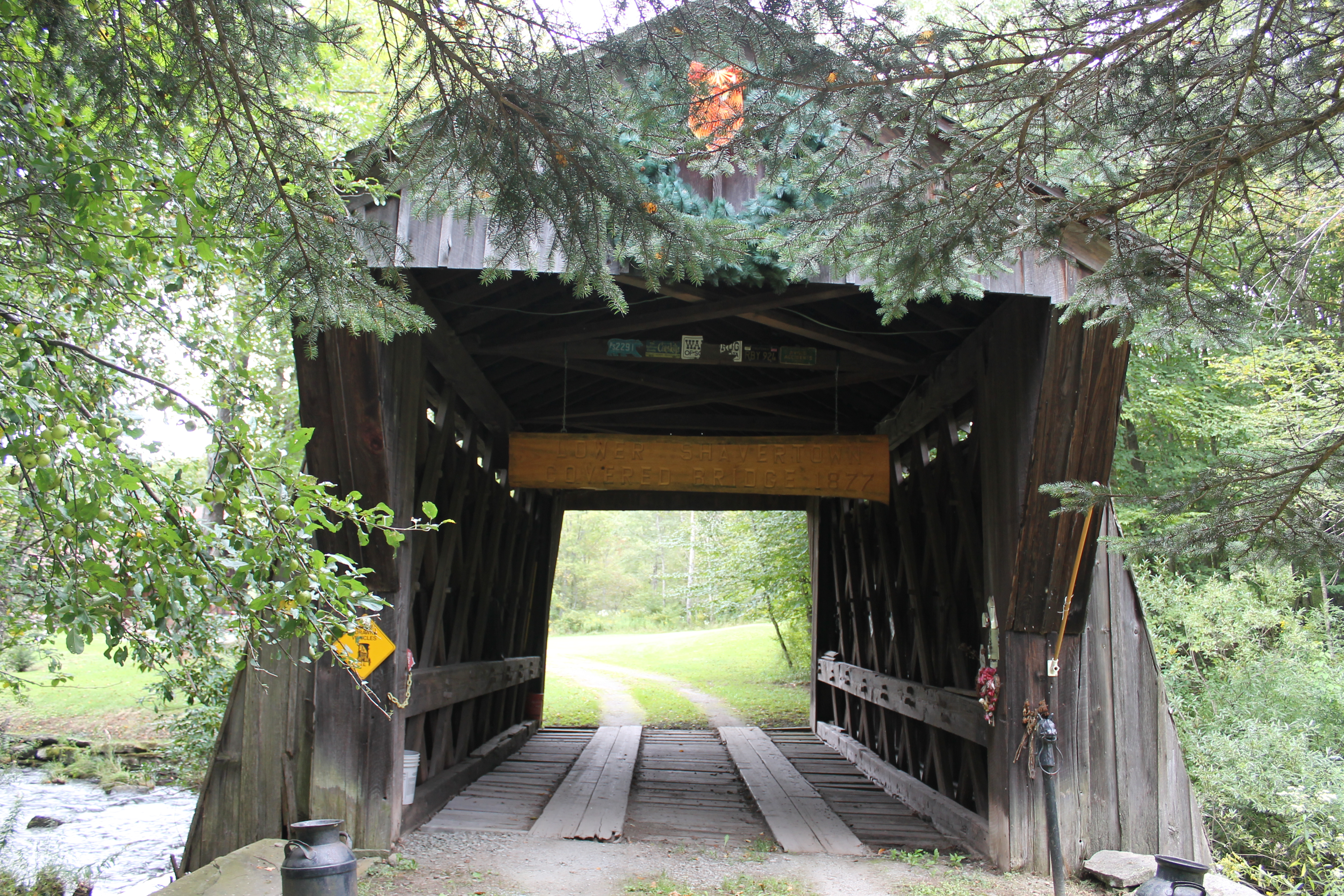
Front of the bridge

It was listed on the National Register of Historic Places in 1999.

== See also ==
- List of bridges on the National Register of Historic Places in New York
- National Register of Historic Places listings in Delaware County, New York
