= Ravina (Lordville, New York) =

- U.S. National Register of Historic Places
- U.S. Historic district
- Location within New York Location within the United States
- Location: Lordville, (Hancock, New York)
- Coordinates: 41°52′16″N 75°12′28″W
- Area: 2.7 acres (1.1 ha)
- Built: 1926
- Architect: Whitaker & Sons, A.L. Snyder
- Architectural style: Bungalow/Craftsman
- MPS: Upper Delaware Valley, New York and Pennsylvania MPS
- NRHP reference No.: 00000048
- Added to NRHP: February 4, 2000

Ravina is a national historic district located at Lordville, a hamlet in the Town of Hancock in Delaware County, New York. The district contains six contributing buildings, one contributing site, and two contributing structures. It encompasses a small rural estate consisting of the main house, guest bungalow, garage, caretakers' dwelling, wood shed, and distinctive landscape features. The main residence is a three-by-three-bay, 2-story wood-frame building listed in the Sears catalog of prefabricated houses as "Shadow Lawn." It and the bungalow were built in 1926–1927.

It was listed on the National Register of Historic Places in 2000.

== See also ==
- National Register of Historic Places listings in Delaware County, New York
