= Franklin Village Historic District =

Historic district in New York, United States

- U.S. National Register of Historic Places
- U.S. Historic district
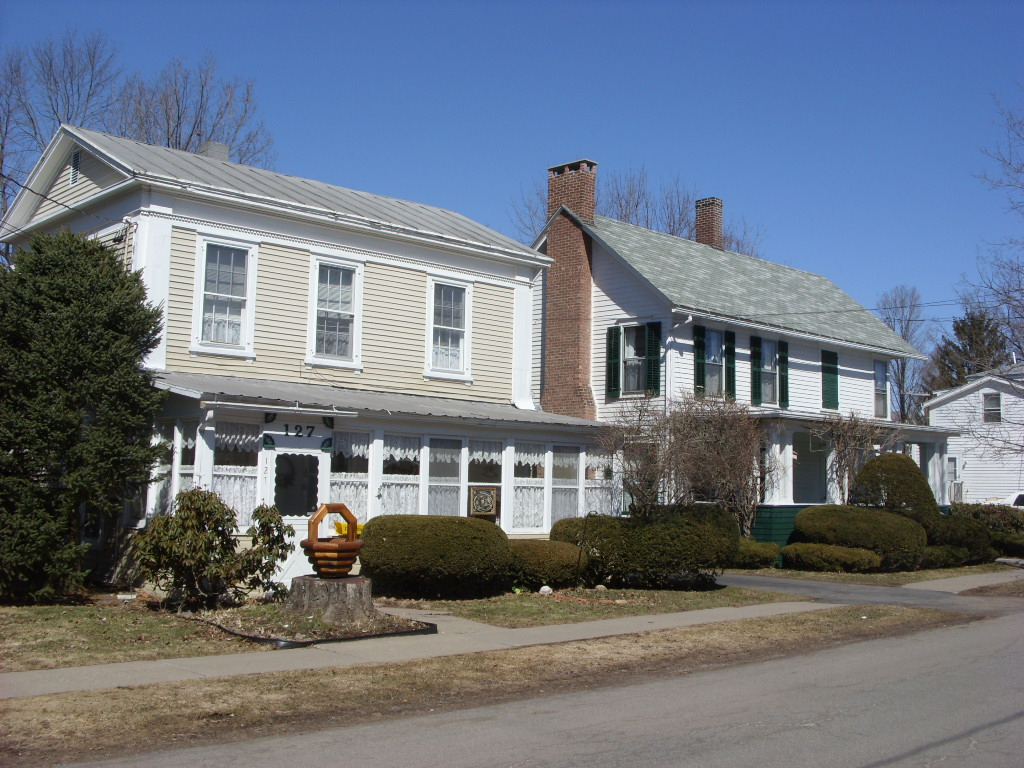
- Houses at Franklin NY, March 2009

- Location within New York Location within the United States
- Location: Wakeman and Institute Aves., Main, Center, Maple, Water, 2nd, 3rd, and West Sts., Franklin, New York
- Coordinates: 42°20′24″N 75°9′58″W
- Area: 189 acres (76 ha)
- Built: 1820
- Architect: Upjohn, Richard, & Richard M.
- Architectural style: Greek Revival, Italianate, Federal
- NRHP reference No.: 84002220
- Added to NRHP: September 7, 1984

Franklin Village Historic District is a national historic district located at Franklin in Delaware County, New York. The district contains 242 contributing buildings, four contributing sites, and one contributing object. The majority of the buildings are residential, with three churches, 12 commercial buildings, one industrial structure, five institutional and/or public buildings, four historic cemeteries, and one monument. One of the churches is a board and batten structure reportedly designed by Richard Upjohn and his son Richard M. Upjohn in 1865. Located within the district is the separately listed New Stone Hall.

It was listed on the National Register of Historic Places in 1984.

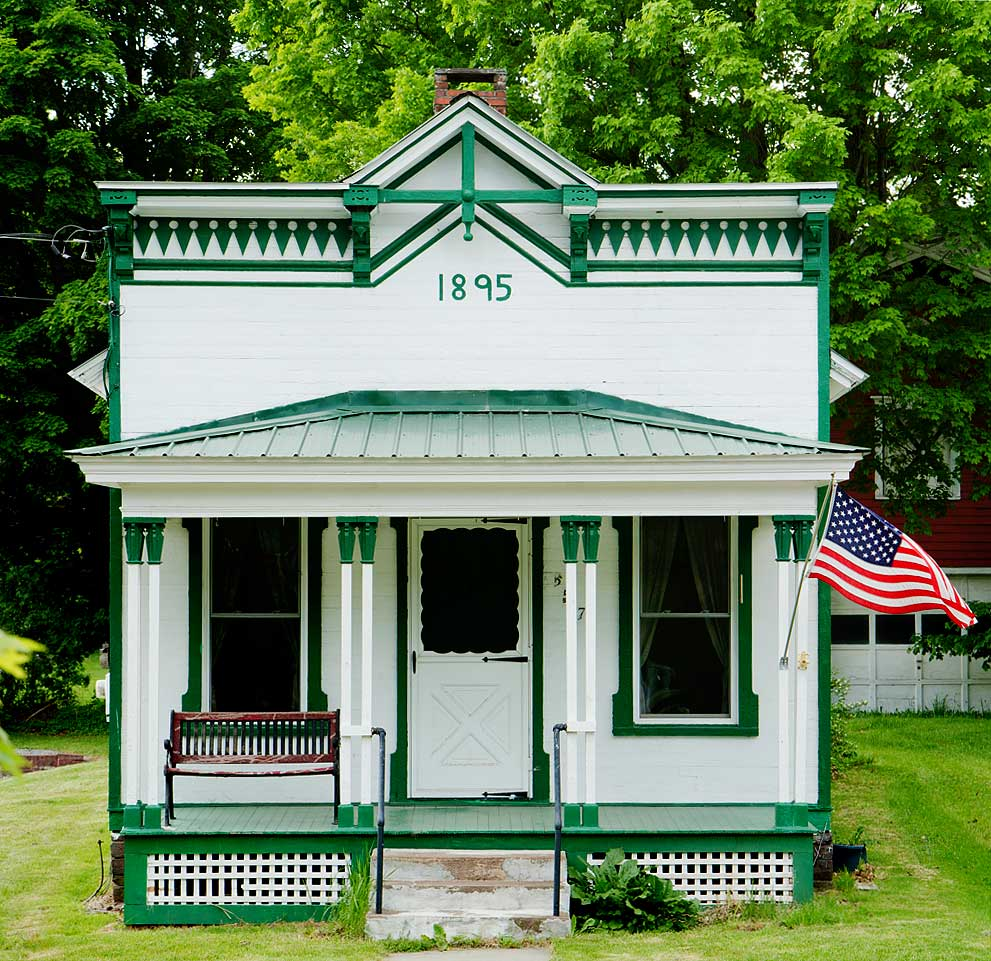
House on Main Street in historic Franklin, NY

== Gallery ==
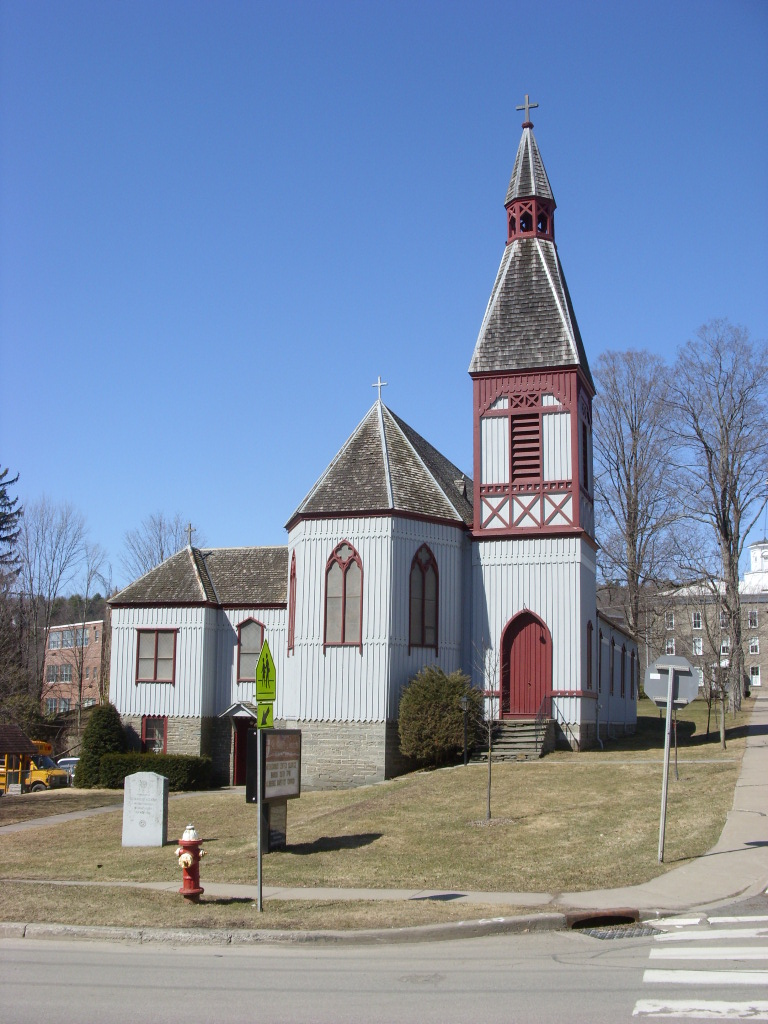
Upjohn Church at Franklin NY March 2009

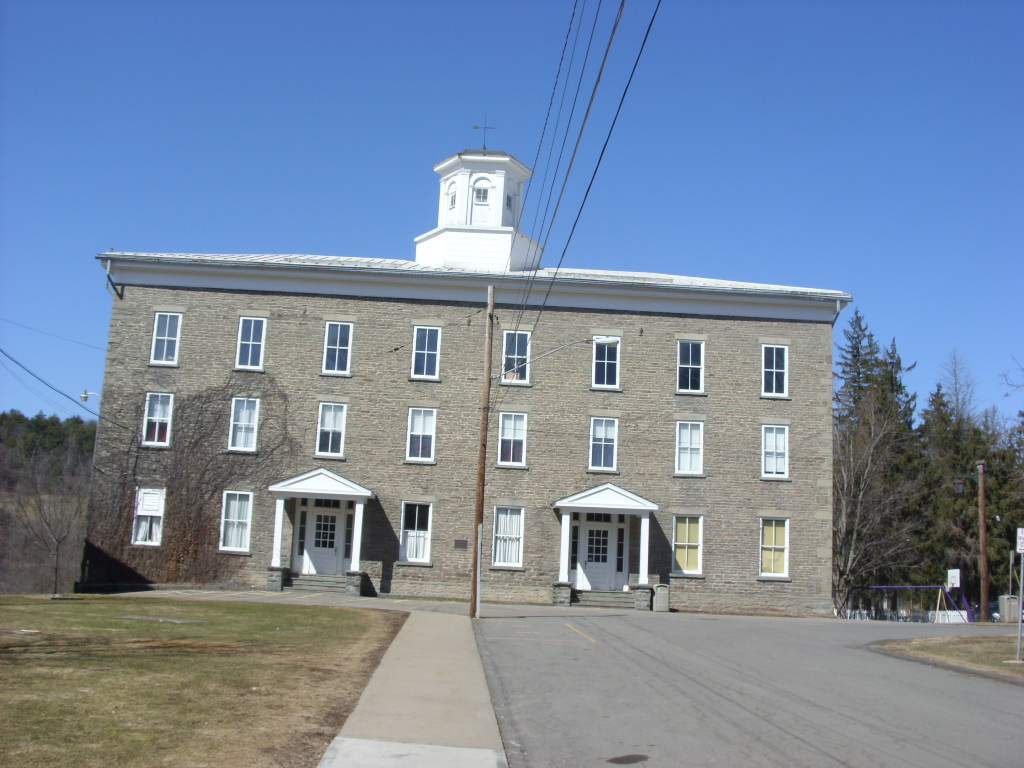
New Stone Hall, March 2009

== See also ==
- National Register of Historic Places listings in Delaware County, New York
