= West Meredith Cemetery =

Historic cemetery in New York, United States

- U.S. National Register of Historic Places
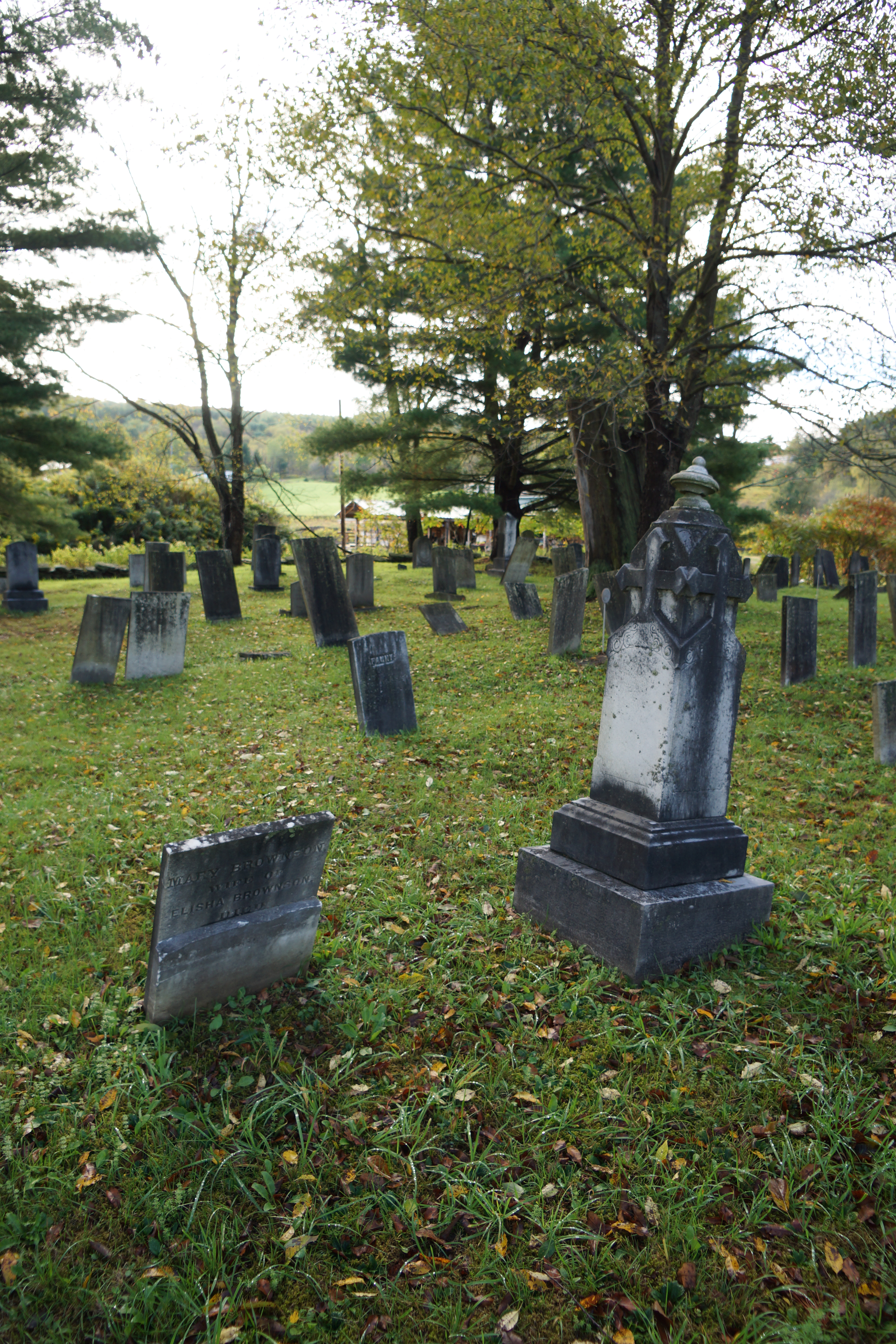

- Location within New York Location within the United States
- Location: Cty Rte. 14, West Meredith, New York
- Coordinates: 42°20′48″N 75°1′36″W
- Area: less than one acre
- NRHP reference No.: 03001119
- Added to NRHP: November 7, 2003

West Meredith Cemetery is a historic cemetery located at West Meredith in Delaware County, New York, United States. It is a burial ground affiliated with a former Baptist congregation and the earliest stone dates to 1807. It contains the graves of many of Meredith's earliest settlers.

It was listed on the National Register of Historic Places in 2003.

== See also ==
- National Register of Historic Places listings in Delaware County, New York
