= Rock Valley School =

- U.S. National Register of Historic Places
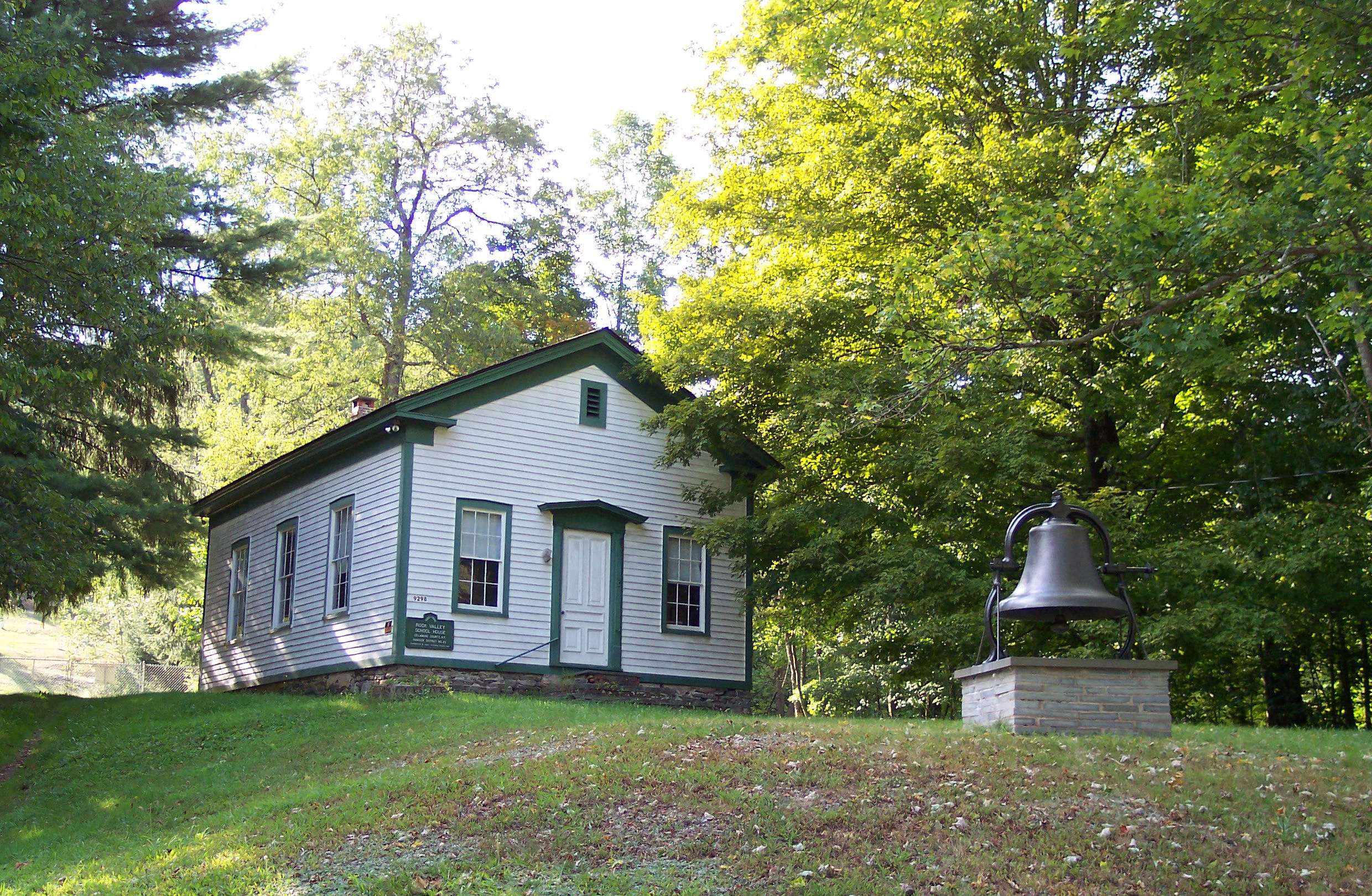

- Location within New York Location within the United States
- Location: 9598 Rock Valley Rd., Rock Valley, New York
- Coordinates: 41°53′32.51″N 75°5′3.97″W
- Area: less than one acre
- Built: 1885
- Architect: Inman, John E.
- NRHP reference No.: 08000406
- Added to NRHP: May 12, 2008

Rock Valley School is a historic one-room school building located at Rock Valley in Delaware County, New York, United States. It was built in 1885 and is a one-story wood-frame building on a cut-stone foundation and gable roof. The main section of the building is rectangular and approximately 24 feet by 36 feet, two bays wide and three bays deep. It was used as a school into the early 1940s and used as a polling place and community meeting house since the 1950s.

It was listed on the National Register of Historic Places in 2008.

== See also ==
- National Register of Historic Places listings in Delaware County, New York
