= Lordville Presbyterian Church =

Historic church in New York, United States

- U.S. National Register of Historic Places
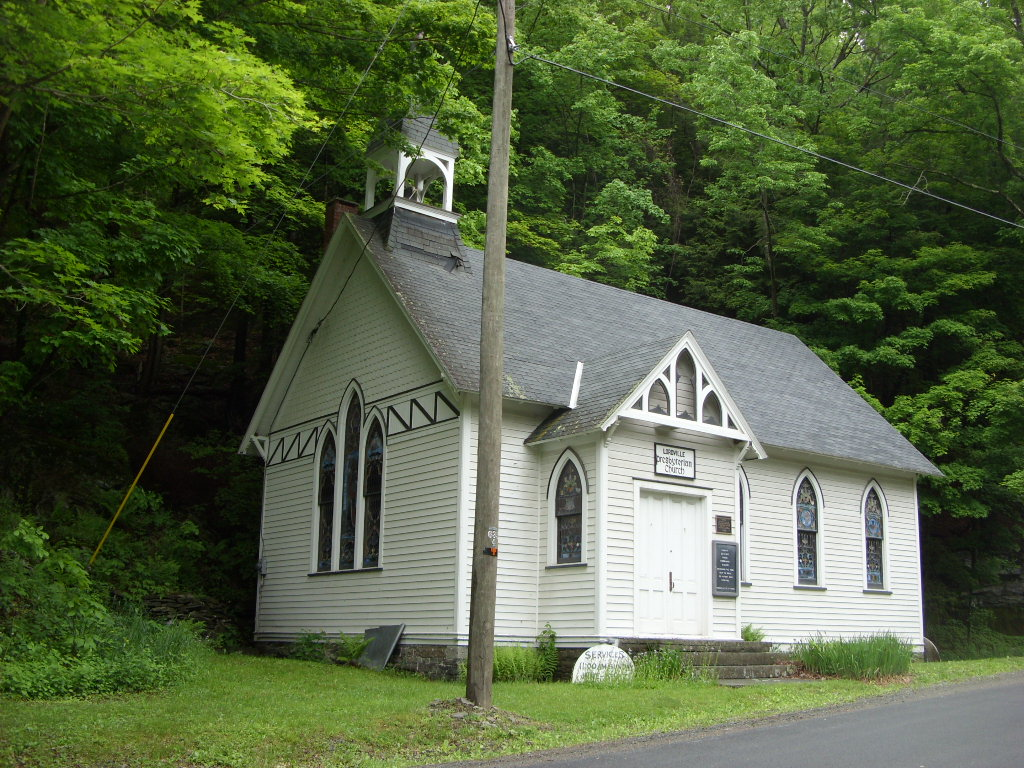
- Lordville Presbyterian Church, May 2009

- Location within New York Location within the United States
- Location: Lordville Rd., Lordville, New York
- Coordinates: 41°52′11″N 75°12′57″W
- Area: less than one acre
- Built: 1896
- Architect: Brokaw and Co.
- Architectural style: Late Victorian
- MPS: Upper Delaware Valley, New York and Pennsylvania MPS
- NRHP reference No.: 00000052
- Added to NRHP: February 4, 2000

Lordville Presbyterian Church is a historic Presbyterian church located on Lordville Road in Lordville in Delaware County, New York. It is a single story frame building built in 1896. It features a steep gable roof and open, square shaped belfry.

It was added to the National Register of Historic Places in 2000.

== See also ==
- National Register of Historic Places listings in Delaware County, New York
