= MacDonald Farm =

Historic house in New York, United States

- U.S. National Register of Historic Places
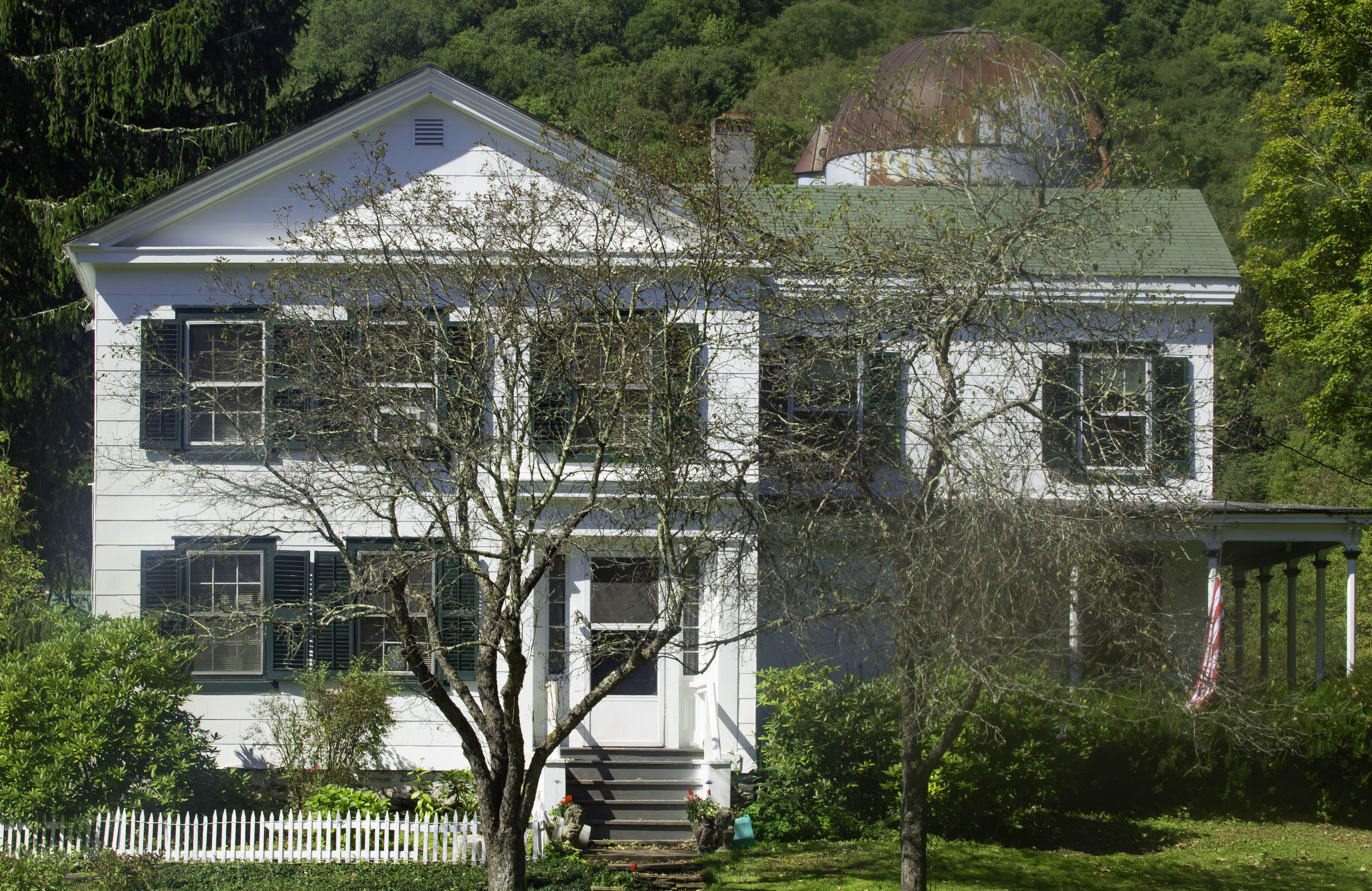

- Location within New York Location within the United States
- Location: Elk Creek and Monroe Rds., Meredith, New York
- Coordinates: 42°21′14″N 74°51′44″W
- Area: 200 acres (81 ha)
- Built: 1851
- NRHP reference No.: 73001179
- Added to NRHP: April 3, 1973

MacDonald Farm is a historic farm complex located at Meredith in Delaware County, New York, United States. The complex consists of the main farm house, a hops barn now used as a garage, privy, smokehouse, incubator shed, barn, straw barn, creamery, mill building, and two residences built for married hired hands. The farm house was built in 1851 and most of the buildings were built between 1870 and 1900.

It was listed on the National Register of Historic Places in 1973.

== See also ==
- National Register of Historic Places listings in Delaware County, New York
