= Hamden Bridge =

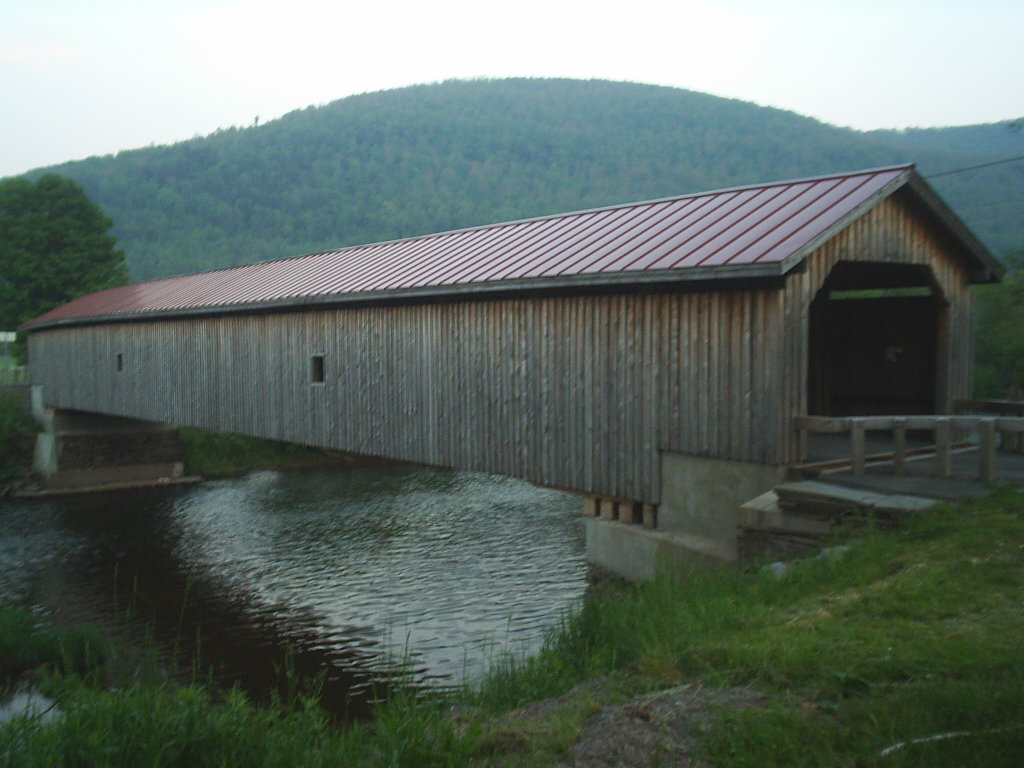
- Hamden Covered Bridge, May 2006
- Coordinates: 42°11′46″N 74°59′20″W
- Crosses: West Branch of the Delaware River
- Hamden Covered Bridge
- U.S. National Register of Historic Places
- Location within New York Location within the United States
- Location: Basin Clove Road, Hamden, New York
- Coordinates: 42°11′44″N 74°59′19″W
- Area: less than one acre
- Built: 1859
- Built by: Murray, Robert
- NRHP reference No.: 99000502
- Added to NRHP: April 29, 1999

Location
- Interactive map of Hamden Bridge

Hamden Bridge is a wooden covered bridge over the West Branch of the Delaware River in the hamlet of Hamden in Delaware County, New York. It was built in 1859, and is a single span, timber and plan framed bridge. It measures 128 feet long and 18 feet wide. A supporting center pier was added in 1940 but has been removed. The bridge has been carefully restored, remains in active use, and is open to vehicular traffic.

The Hamden Covered Bridge was designed and built by Robert Murray, an emigree from Scotland who constructed numerous covered bridges in Upstate New York, nine in Delaware County, in the western range of the Catskill Mountains. While he was constructing the bridge in Hamden and another in nearby Delancey, Murray walked from his home in Andes, about 19 miles away, supposedly barefoot to conserve his shoes, to Hamden, where he boarded for the week before walking home on Saturdays. Robert Murray’s brother William Murray Jr., was a local lawyer who served as District Attorney and was elected a State Supreme Court Justice. Extensive information about the bridge and Hamden’s history can be found in Spans of Time, Covered Bridges of Delaware County, by historian Ward E. Hermann (Delside Press 1974). The book also contains a colored painting of the bridge by the author.

It was listed on the National Register of Historic Places in 1999. The bridge was designated as a New York Historic Civil Engineering Landmark by the American Society of Civil Engineers in 2001.

== See also ==
- List of bridges on the National Register of Historic Places in New York
- National Register of Historic Places listings in Delaware County, New York
