= New Stone Hall =

- U.S. National Register of Historic Places
- U.S. Historic district – Contributing property
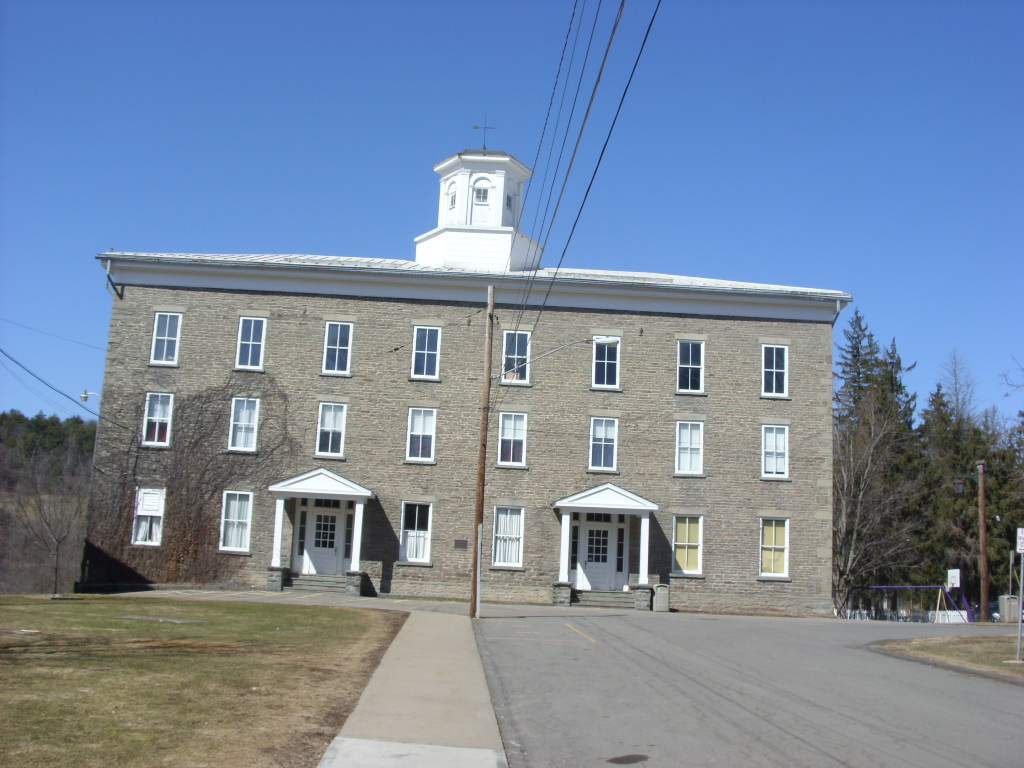
- New Stone Hall, March 2009

- Location within New York Location within the United States
- Location: Center St., Franklin, New York
- Coordinates: 42°20′20″N 75°10′6″W
- Area: less than one acre
- Built: 1855-1856
- Architectural style: Greek Revival, Greek revival vernacular
- Part of: Franklin Village Historic District
- NRHP reference No.: 80002600
- Added to NRHP: May 06, 1980

New Stone Hall is a historic school building located at Franklin in Delaware County, New York, United States. It was built in 1855–1856 and is a three-story rectangular building, eight bays wide and three bays deep. It features a slate-covered hipped roof and octagonal cupola. It was built as the main academic building of the Delaware Literary Institute, then later used by the local school system. It was abandoned in 1932. It is located within the Franklin Village Historic District.

It was listed on the National Register of Historic Places in 1980.

== See also ==
- National Register of Historic Places listings in Delaware County, New York
