= Windfall (2010 film) =

- Directed by: Laura Israel
- Release date: 2010
- Country: United States
- Language: English

Windfall is a 2010 documentary film directed by Laura Israel about the reaction of residents in rural Meredith, New York (in Delaware County, New York) to a proposal to place numerous wind turbines in their community to harness wind power. It is notable that the film was made by an interested local citizen rather than an organization.

== Summary ==
The film begins in 2004, when energy companies approached several property owners in Meredith, offering cash payments to allow the long-term placement of wind turbines standing over 400 feet tall on their land. The documentary portrays Meredith residents as deeply divided over the idea. Some believe the economic and energy benefits are worth investigating. Others are concerned about the towers being an eyesore, loss of property values, or posing a variety of hazards such as collapse, accumulation of ice which is then flung from the turbines in large chunks, or health problems attributed to low frequency noise. Residents of Lowville, New York are also interviewed, expressing regret at installing wind turbines in their community.

After an often rancorous debate, the citizens vote out the current officials who were promoting wind energy, and were not amenable to enacting a protective wind ordinance. The newly elected officials in Meredith subsequently passed a citizen-friendly wind law, and the developer decided to leave the community.

The film is composed mostly of interviews with Meredith residents. Also included are excerpts of news broadcasts, films of town council meetings, and computer-animated segments.

== Reactions ==
Roger Ebert gave the film 3 out of 4 stars, writing that the film "left me disheartened. I thought wind energy was something I could believe in. This film suggests it's just another corporate flim-flam game." He notes that there is doubtless a legion of wind-power activists and lobbyists who would counter-argue the points made in Windfall, but asks "How many of them live on wind farms?" In a review for The New York Times, Andy Webster writes that Israel's film tends to "overheat" but raises important questions: "The quest for energy independence comes with caveats. Developers’ motives must be weighed, as should the risks Americans are willing to take in their own backyard."

== See also ==
- Environmental impact of wind power
