= Halcottsville, New York =

- Hamlet
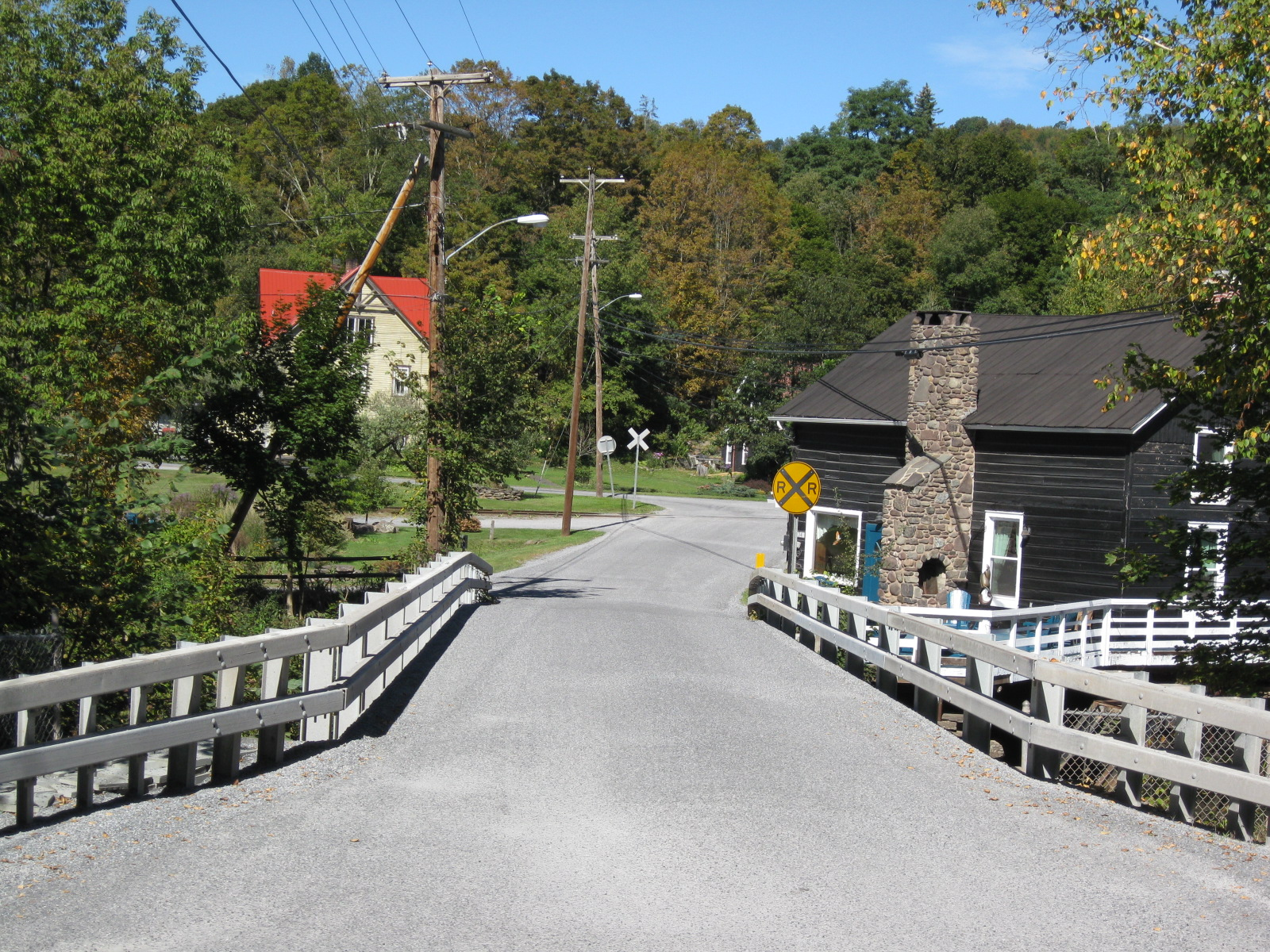
- A bridge crosses the East Branch Delaware River in Halcottsville

- Location within New York
- Coordinates: 42°12′30″N 74°36′04″W
- Country: United States
- State: New York
- County: Delaware
- Town: Middletown
- Elevation: 1,401 ft (427 m)
- Time zone: UTC-5 (Eastern (EST))
  - Summer (DST): UTC-4 (EDT)
- Zip code: 12438
- Area code: 607
- GNIS feature ID: 952009

Halcottsville is a hamlet in the town of Middletown, Delaware County, New York, United States, on the south shore of Wawaka Lake. It was named for John Halcott (1758-1831), a Revolutionary War soldier from Delaware County. He resided with his son Thomas in Halcottsville until his demise. Halcottsville is located on the East Branch Delaware River and New York State Route 30 5.6 miles (9.0 km) northeast of Margaretville. Halcottsville has a post office with ZIP code 12438. The hamlet has a stop on the excursion Delaware & Ulster Railroad which originates in nearby Arkville and extends north to the village of Roxbury.

The Kelly Round Barn and Old School Baptist Church of Halcottsville are listed on the National Register of Historic Places.
