= Hotel Delaware =

- U.S. National Register of Historic Places
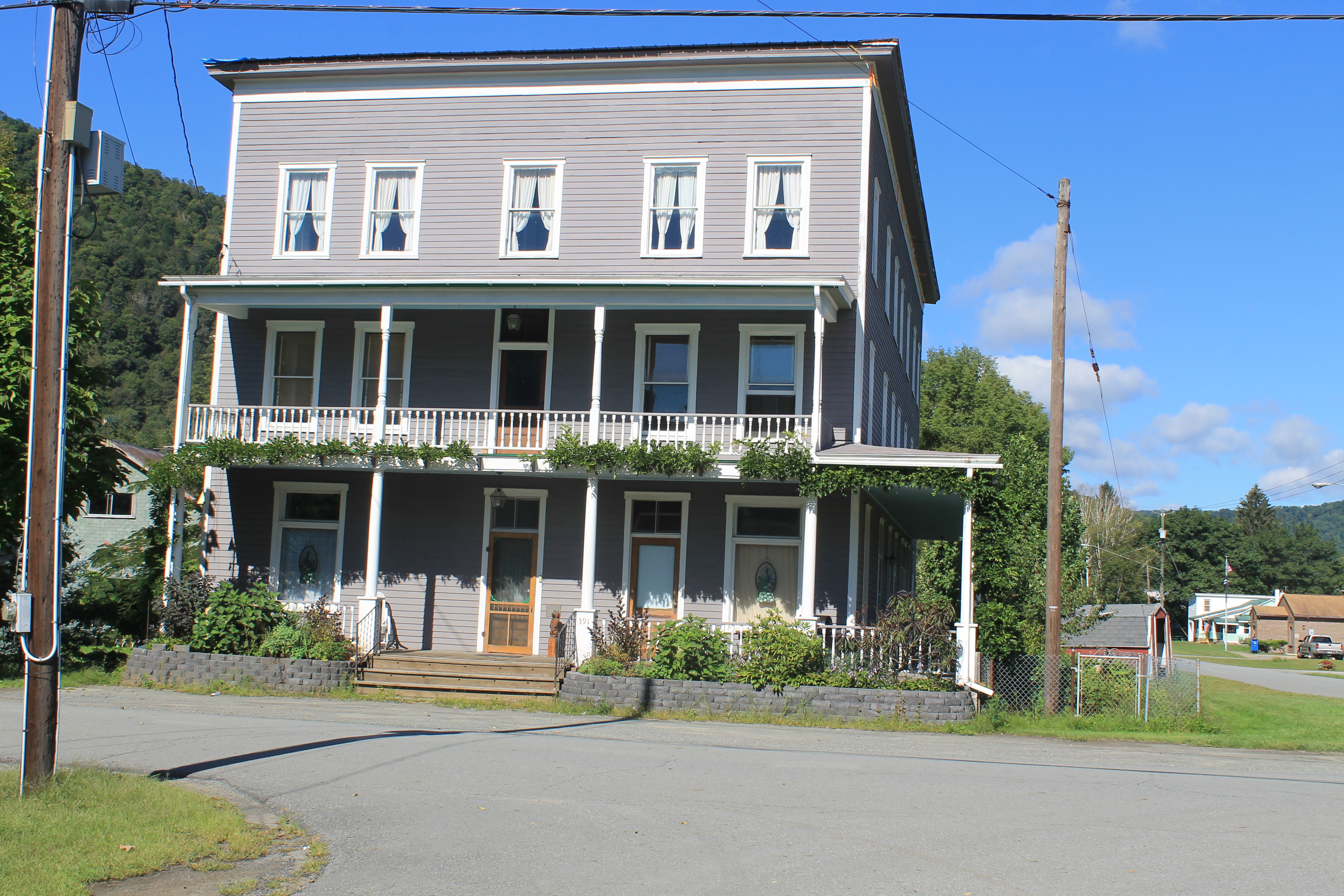
- Hotel Delaware, September 2013

- Location within New York Location within the United States
- Location: 391 Main St., East Branch, New York
- Coordinates: 41°59′17″N 75°8′4″W
- Area: 1.4 acres (0.57 ha)
- Built: 1891
- NRHP reference No.: 04001342
- Added to NRHP: December 6, 2004

Hotel Delaware is a historic hotel building located at East Branch in Delaware County, New York, United States. It was built in 1891 and enlarged after a fire in 1908. It is a large three-story wood-framed building, 40 feet wide and 70 feet deep. It features a two-story verandah on the front facade supported by Doric order columns on the first story.

It was listed on the National Register of Historic Places in 2004.

== See also ==
- National Register of Historic Places listings in Delaware County, New York
