= Hancock, New York =

- Town
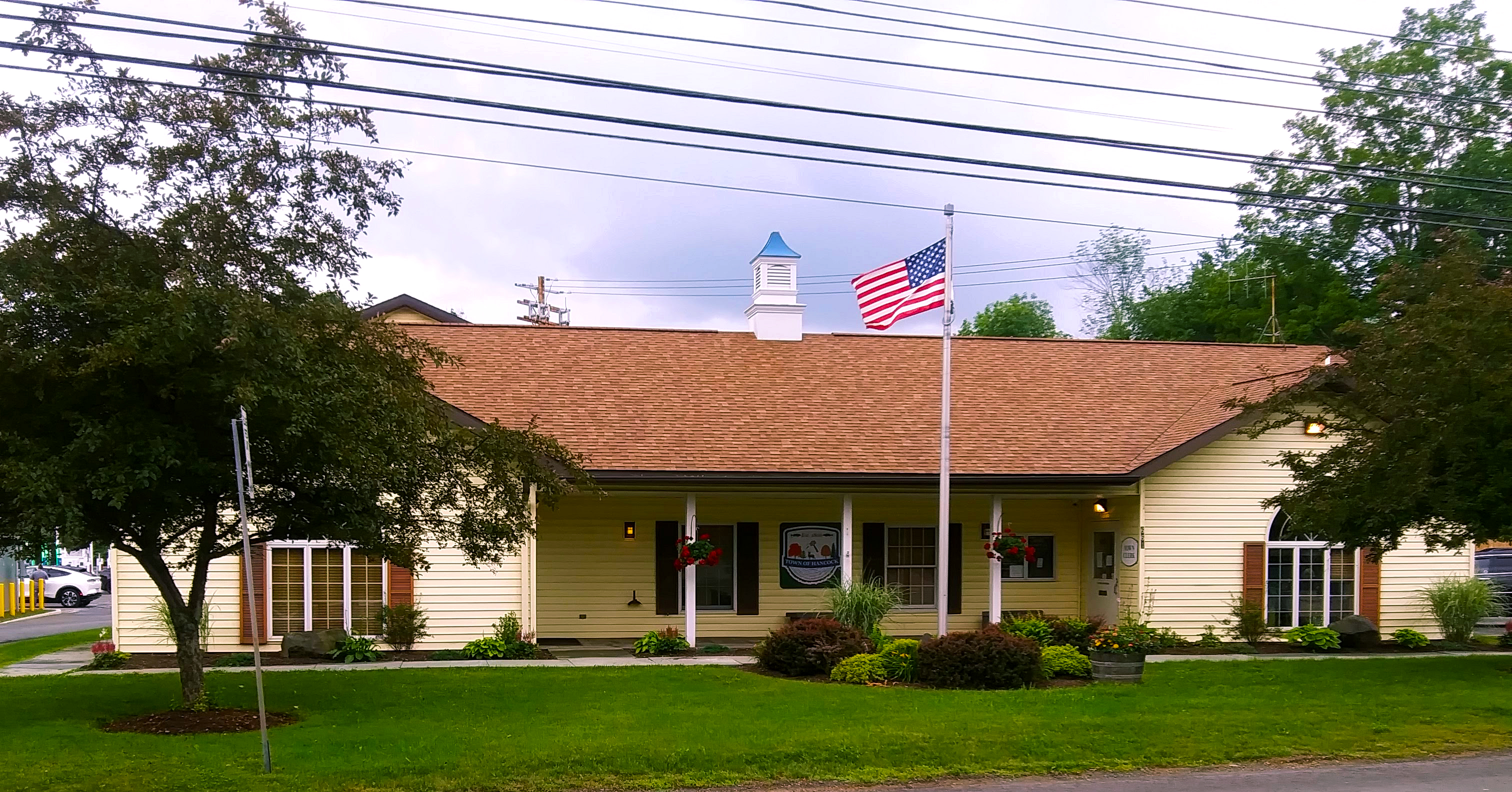
- Town hall
- Motto: "Gateway to the Upper Delaware"
- Location within the state of New York Hancock (the United States)
- Coordinates: 41°57′19″N 75°17′15″W
- Country: United States
- State: New York
- County: Delaware

Government
  - Type: Town Council
  - Town Supervisor: Jerry Vernold
  - Town Council: Members: • James M. Gardner (R); • Paul A. Vetrone (R); • Jerry Vernold (R); • Patrick J. O'Brien (R)

Area
  - Total: 161.82 sq mi (419.10 km^{2})
  - Land: 158.83 sq mi (411.36 km^{2})
  - Water: 2.99 sq mi (7.75 km^{2})
- Elevation: 922 ft (281 m)

Population (2020)
  - Total: 2,764
- Time zone: UTC-5 (Eastern (EST))
  - Summer (DST): UTC-4 (EDT)
- ZIP Codes: 13783 (Hancock); 13774 (Fishs Eddy); 13756 (East Branch); 12760 (Long Eddy); 12776 (Roscoe); 13856 (Walton)
- Area codes: 607, 845, 570
- FIPS code: 36-025-31951
- GNIS feature ID: 0952148
- Website: www.hancockny.org

Hancock is a town in Delaware County, New York, United States. The town contains a village, also named Hancock. The town is in the southwest part of the county. The population was 2,764 at the 2020 census. The town is the largest by area in Delaware County. The town borders two other counties, Sullivan County to the south and Pennsylvania's Wayne County to the west. The town is located partially in the Catskill Park.

== History ==
This town was established in 1806 from part of the town of Colchester. It is named for John Hancock, signer of the Declaration of the Independence.

== Sports and the Upper Delaware River ==
The town of Hancock has a rich history of sports. Perhaps the most popular sports are baseball and fishing. Fly fishing is extremely popular due to the Upper Delaware River, which flows through the town. The river is a large economic engine that powers many businesses in Hancock and neighboring areas. The Hancock Golf Course was designed in 1941 by famed golf architect, Robert Trent Jones, Sr.

Baseball has been a part of Hancock for generations. A local Hancock native, Eddie Murphy, was a professional baseball player in the major leagues. "Honest Eddie" Murphy appeared in three World Series during his time in MLB. Most recently, Hancock Central School joined forces with Deposit Central School for all sports, in 2016. The new sporting programs played under the name of the D-H Eagles. Prior to that, from 2010 to 2015, the Hancock Wildcats won six Section 4 baseball championships in a row. After joining forces with Deposit in 2016, and falling in the state semifinals in 2017, the D-H Eagles final broke through and won their first State Championship in 2018. D-H defeated Fort Plain 9-3.

== Geography ==
The southwestern town line, delineated by the Delaware River, is the border of Pennsylvania. The East Branch of the Delaware flows from east to west across the town, joining the West Branch at Hancock village to form the Delaware River proper. Upstream from Hancock village, the town line and state line are formed by the West Branch. NY Route 17 passes through the town, with access from Exits 87 through 90.

According to the United States Census Bureau, the town has a total area of 161.8 square miles (419.1 km^{2}), of which 158.8 square miles (411.3 km^{2}) is land and 3.0 square miles (7.8 km^{2}), or 1.85%, is water.

== Demographics ==
Historical population
| Census | Pop. | Note | %± |
|---|---|---|---|
| 1820 | 525 | | — |
| 1830 | 766 | | 45.9% |
| 1840 | 1,026 | | 33.9% |
| 1850 | 1,798 | | 75.2% |
| 1860 | 2,862 | | 59.2% |
| 1870 | 3,069 | | 7.2% |
| 1880 | 3,238 | | 5.5% |
| 1890 | 4,745 | | 46.5% |
| 1900 | 5,308 | | 11.9% |
| 1910 | 5,191 | | −2.2% |
| 1920 | 4,122 | | −20.6% |
| 1930 | 3,953 | | −4.1% |
| 1940 | 3,813 | | −3.5% |
| 1950 | 3,517 | | −7.8% |
| 1960 | 3,907 | | 11.1% |
| 1970 | 3,604 | | −7.8% |
| 1980 | 3,497 | | −3.0% |
| 1990 | 3,384 | | −3.2% |
| 2000 | 3,450 | | 2.0% |
| 2010 | 3,224 | | −6.6% |
| 2020 | 2,764 | | −14.3% |
U.S. Decennial Census

As of the census of 2000, there were 3,449 people, 1,390 households, and 913 families residing in the town. The population density was 21.6 inhabitants per square mile (8.3/km^{2}). There were 2,512 housing units at an average density of 15.8 per square mile (6.1/km^{2}). The racial makeup of the town was 96.69% White, 0.70% Black or African American, 0.52% Native American, 0.61% Asian, 0.32% from other races, and 1.16% from two or more races. Hispanic or Latino of any race were 2.38% of the population.

There were 1,390 households, out of which 28.6% had children under the age of 18 living with them, 52.3% were married couples living together, 8.1% had a female householder with no husband present, and 34.3% were non-families. 30.1% of all households were made up of individuals, and 15.5% had someone living alone who was 65 years of age or older. The average household size was 2.48 and the average family size was 3.01.

In the town, the population was spread out, with 24.1% under the age of 18, 5.9% from 18 to 24, 24.1% from 25 to 44, 27.0% from 45 to 64, and 18.9% who were 65 years of age or older. The median age was 42 years. For every 100 females, there were 98.4 males. For every 100 females age 18 and over, there were 94.9 males.

The median income for a household in the town was $30,449, and the median income for a family was $37,125. Males had a median income of $28,259 versus $21,875 for females. The per capita income for the town was $16,057. About 8.4% of families and 14.3% of the population were below the poverty line, including 19.3% of those under age 18 and 13.4% of those age 65 or over.

== Notable people ==
- Henry Bidleman Bascom (1796–1850), religious circuit rider, Methodist bishop, chaplain to US Congress
- Clark L. Hood (1847–1920), Wisconsin State Assemblyman and lawyer
- "Honest Eddie" Murphy, baseball player, appeared in three World Series
- Harold Searles (1918–2015), psychiatrist

== Communities and locations in the Town of Hancock ==
- Cadosia — A hamlet northeast of Hancock village.
- Centerville — A location in the northern part of the town on New York State Route 30.
- Chiloway — A hamlet southwest of Peakville.
- East Branch - The Hotel Delaware was listed on the National Register of Historic Places in 2004.
- Fish's Eddy — A hamlet northeast of Hancock village on New York State Route 17.
- French Woods — A hamlet near the center of the town on New York State Route 97.
- French Woods Festival of the Performing Arts - A performing arts summer camp for children
- French Woods Sports and Arts Center - A private summer camp for teens only
- Goulds — A hamlet near the eastern town line. See Gould Cemetery website
- Hancock — A village by the western town line.
- Harvard — A location near the northeastern town line on New York State Route 30.
- Islamberg - a hamlet west of the village.
- Kelsey — A hamlet at the northwestern town line north of Hancock village and south of Cannonsville Reservoir.
- Kerry Siding — A hamlet at the northwestern town line.
- Kerryville — A hamlet at the northwestern town line.
- Kilgore Spur — A location west of Lordville.
- Kingswood Campsite — A Methodist campsite.
- Long Flat — A location near the northeastern town line.
- Lordville — A hamlet by the Delaware River in the southern part of the town. The Lordville Presbyterian Church and the Ravina historic district are listed on the National Register of Historic Places.
- Luzerne — A hamlet southeast of Fishs Eddy on New York State Route 28.
- Methol — The Lower Shavertown Covered Bridge was listed on the National Register of Historic Places in 1999.
- Peakville — A hamlet west of East Branch (historically called Trout Brook).
- Pea Brook — A location in the southern part of the town on New York State Route 97.
- Peas Eddy — A hamlet east of Hancock village by the Delaware River.
- Point Mountain Mausoleum — an abandoned mausoleum at the top of Point Mountain.
- Readburn — A hamlet in the northern part of the town.
- Rock Valley — A hamlet by the eastern town line. The Rock Valley School was listed on the National Register of Historic Places in 2008.
- Tylers Switch — A hamlet east of Hancock village near New York State Route 17.
