= Schoolhouse No. 5 =

- U.S. National Register of Historic Places
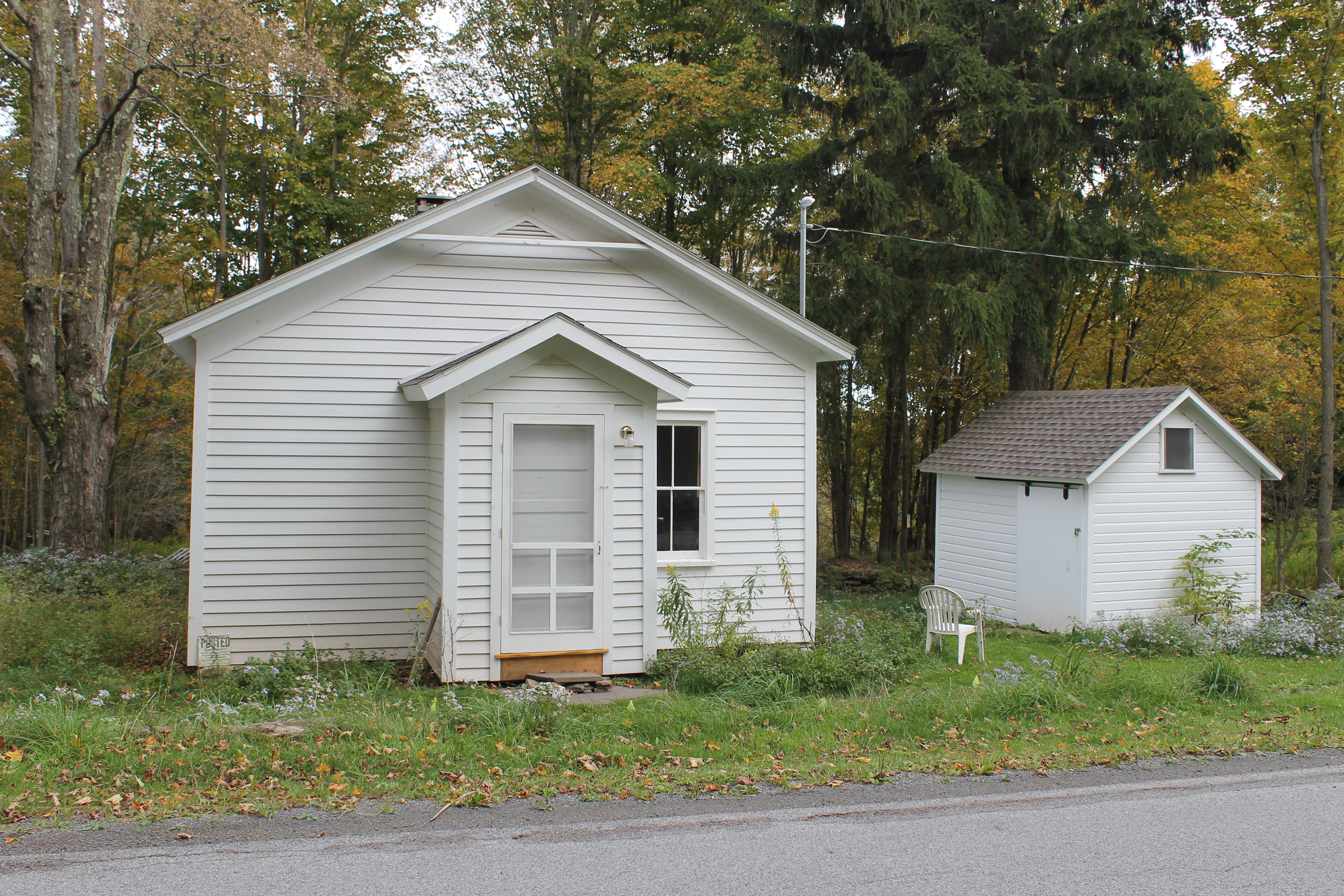
- Schoolhouse No. 5, photographed in September 2013

- Location within New York Location within the United States
- Location: 5942 Dunk Hill Road, Hamden, New York
- Coordinates: 42°16′4.632″N 75°5′7.838″W
- Area: less than 1 acre (0.40 ha)
- Built: 1858
- NRHP reference No.: 11000326
- Added to NRHP: June 1, 2011

Schoolhouse No. 5 is a historic building in Hamden, New York. This one-room schoolhouse was built in the winter of 1857–1858, and was then known as Upper Dunk Hill School. The school was in use from 1858 to 1954. It is located at 5942 Dunk Hill Road and was officially recognized as a historic place in 2011.
