= Wawaka Lake =

Lake in Delaware County, New York, USA

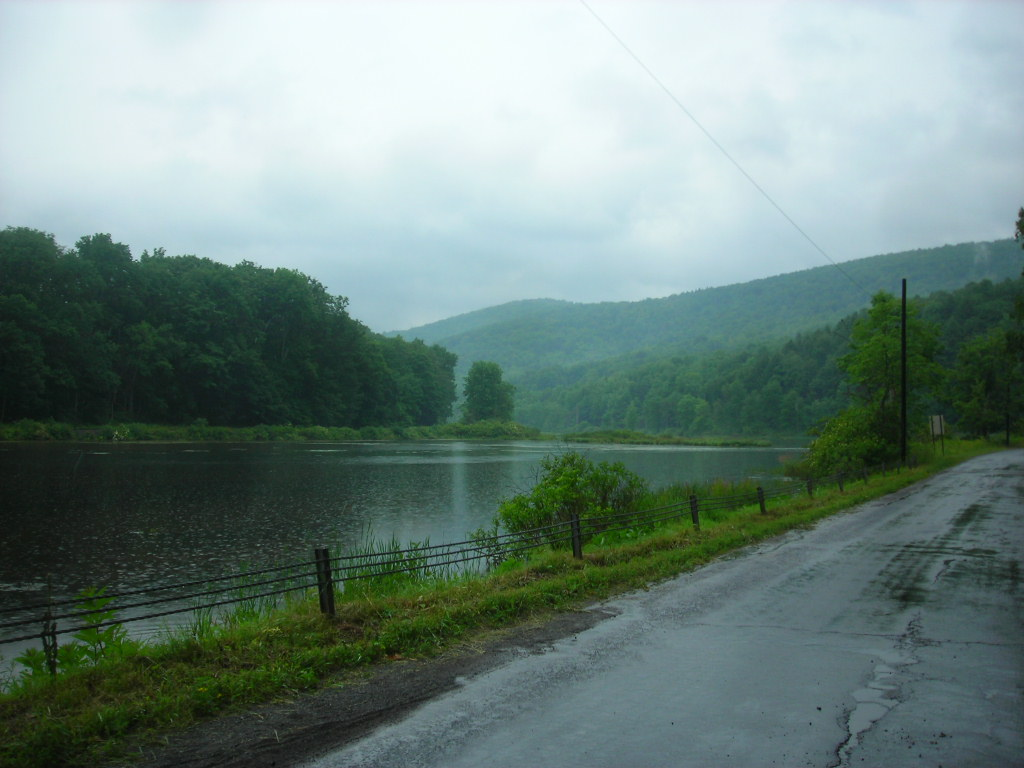
- Wawaka Lake in July 2007.

- Location of Wawaka Lake within New York State
- Location: Delaware County, New York
- Coordinates: 42°12′42″N 74°35′46″W
- Primary inflows: East Branch Delaware River
- Primary outflows: East Branch Delaware River
- Basin countries: United States
- Surface area: 28 acres (11 ha)
- Surface elevation: 1,404 ft (428 m)
- Settlements: Halcottsville, Margaretville

Wawaka Lake is a small lake by Halcottsville in Delaware County, New York. It is located north-northeast of Margaretville. The East Branch Delaware River flows through the lake.

== See also ==
- List of lakes in New York
