= Franklin (village), New York =

Franklin, New York
- Village
- Location within the state of New York
- Coordinates: 42°20′26″N 75°9′57″W
- Country: United States
- State: New York
- County: Delaware
- Town: Franklin

Area
  - Total: 0.34 sq mi (0.89 km^{2})
  - Land: 0.34 sq mi (0.88 km^{2})
  - Water: 0.0077 sq mi (0.02 km^{2})
- Elevation: 1,234 ft (376 m)

Population (2020)
  - Total: 258
  - Density: 761.4/sq mi (293.96/km^{2})
- Time zone: UTC-5 (Eastern (EST))
  - Summer (DST): UTC-4 (EDT)
- ZIP Code: 13775
- Area code: 607
- FIPS code: 36-27221
- GNIS feature ID: 2390849
- Website: villageoffranklinny.gov

Franklin is a village in Delaware County of the U.S. state of New York. As of the 2010 census, the village population was 374. The village is in the town of Franklin.

The area was not settled by European Americans until after the Revolutionary War, when pioneers came from New England, downstate, and as new immigrants. The area was mostly rural, and population declined in the late 20th century due to urbanization elsewhere. Retirees and people with second homes have also appreciated Franklin. The Franklin Village Historic District and New Stone Hall are listed on the National Register of Historic Places.

== Geography ==
Franklin is located in the northwestern part of the town of Franklin at 42°20′25″N 75°9′57″W (42.34055, -75.165952), in northern Delaware County. New York State Route 357 passes through the village, leading northeast 11 miles (18 km) to Oneonta and west 9 miles (14 km) to Unadilla.

According to the United States Census Bureau, the village has a total area of 0.3 square miles (0.9 km^{2}), of which 0.01 square miles (0.02 km^{2}), or 1.92%, is water. The village is in the valley of Ouleout Creek, a westward-flowing tributary of the Susquehanna River.

== Demographics ==
Historical population
Census	Pop.	Note	%±
1860	509		—
1870	681		33.8%
1880	660		−3.1%
1890	581		−12.0%
1900	473		−18.6%
1910	473		0.0%
1920	476		0.6%
1930	451		−5.3%
1940	481		6.7%
1950	558		16.0%
1960	525		−5.9%
1970	552		5.1%
1980	440		−20.3%
1990	409		−7.0%
2000	402		−1.7%
2010	374		−7.0%
2020	258		−31.0%
U.S. Decennial Census

As of the census of 2000, there were 402 people, 163 households, and 103 families residing in the village. The population density was 1,166.0 inhabitants per square mile (450.2/km^{2}). There were 193 housing units at an average density of 559.8 per square mile (216.1/km^{2}). The racial makeup of the village was 98.51% White, 0.50% Black or African American, 0.75% from other races, and 0.25% from two or more races. Hispanic or Latino of any race were 0.75% of the population.

There were 163 households, out of which 30.7% had children under the age of 18 living with them, 49.1% were married couples living together, 11.0% had a female householder with no husband present, and 36.8% were non-families. 28.2% of all households were made up of individuals, and 16.6% had someone living alone who was 65 years of age or older. The average household size was 2.47 and the average family size was 3.04.

In the village, the population was spread out, with 28.6% under the age of 18, 5.5% from 18 to 24, 25.6% from 25 to 44, 22.6% from 45 to 64, and 17.7% who were 65 years of age or older. The median age was 38 years. For every 100 females, there were 83.6 males. For every 100 females age 18 and over, there were 77.2 males.

The median income for a household in the village was $30,486, and the median income for a family was $36,500. Males had a median income of $31,250 versus $18,750 for females. The per capita income for the village was $17,056. About 8.7% of families and 13.1% of the population were below the poverty line, including 20.2% of those under age 18 and 2.2% of those age 65 or over.

== Culture ==
The village of Franklin is home to the Franklin Stage Company, a nonprofit theater company offering free performances each summer.

Each summer, the Franklin Farmer's Market is held in front of the Franklin Stage Company, featuring local produce, breads, baked goods, herbs and spices, and preserves.

== History ==
The town of Franklin lies in the northern part of Delaware County, in an area of wooded hills, streams, ponds, historic homes, commercial buildings, and numerous winding roads. Its surface is hilly upland made of shaley loam atop hardpan, while the valleys consist of gravelly loam and alluvium.

Ouleout Creek, which flows into the Susquehanna River, is the main surface water feature. The waterway was important to village development, not only for water supply but as transportation arteries for travel as well as shipment of lumber and goods to market.

The village of Franklin was platted in 1827 by John Edgerton, who had bought 100 acres (40 ha) for the site. It was incorporated in 1836. Throughout the 19th century, the town and village adapted to changes in agricultural demand. Before the Civil War, raising sheep and processing wool was more profitable than the cultivation of grain or rearing of cattle. With the competition by canals and railroads for traffic, the Catskill Turnpike lost some of its business. This resulted in an economic decline in the village.

In 1835, the town gained approval by the state legislature for what it called the Delaware Literary Institute, for higher education. Local students and others from different states paid tuition at this well-received school. Three major buildings were constructed: Stone and Chapel halls. The Civil War and growing tax support for public schools brought about a decline in attendance. The trustees deeded all of DLI's facilities to District 10. With centralization in 1929, the Franklin Central School was created. The following year voters authorized the official name of the school to be Delaware Literary Institute and Franklin Central School, thus preserving part of the past.

By 1860, Franklin village streets showed many fine residences built in the Federal, Greek Revival, Italianate Revival and Gothic styles. Main Street bustled with commercial activity.

Printer George W. Reynolds published and edited Franklin's first newspaper, The Weekly Visitor, from 1855 to 1863. It was succeeded after the Civil War by the Franklin Register, 1868-1883, which changed to the Delaware County Dairyman in 1883-1952. The First National Bank of Franklin was founded in 1863, Amos Douglas being its first president. This bank served the community until 1933, closing during the Great Depression.

In the aftermath of the Civil War, dairying became more important; production of milk, butter, and cheese all increased. A creamery association was formed to develop and market dairy products, especially to the major market of metropolitan New York. In addition to licensed taverns, inns, and hotel, the business directory for the town included dry goods, hardware, furniture, grocery, druggists, carriagemakers, coopers, harness makers, shoemakers, foundry, cigar company, telegraph, ice cream parlor, marble works, doctors, dentists, lawyers, and other vocations.

The trustees of the DLI voted to ask the Board of Regents to establish teacher training at the school and gained the founding of a Normal School in Oneonta, now the State University of New York at Oneonta.

Near the village, the Ouleout Valley Cemetery on Route 357, beginning in 1873, often draws attention for its handsome iron gate and well-manicured grounds. Annual Memorial Day observances have been held at the Soldiers Monument since its dedication in 1889.

Many villages and town community and fraternal associations were started in the 19th century. These included the volunteer Fire Department, Masonic Lodge, Odd Fellows Lodge, Sportsmen's Association, Washington Reading Circle, and Onesiphorus, and the Free Library.

In 1990, the census showed a population of 409 in the Village of Franklin. The number of active farms continued to decline, and absentee ownership increased. Few new businesses survive, and a substantial number of people are retired or commute to work outside the town. Franklin Central School completed a building program in 1991. An annual Franklin Day is held in August to raise funds for the preservation of Stone Hall, once part of the Delaware Literary Institute.

In 1983, the village of Franklin was designated an historic district and placed on the National Register of Historic Places. This honour was a memorable beginning in the continued preservation of Franklin's architectural treasures.

In 1992, the town of Franklin celebrated its bicentennial with many events. On July 25, 1992, dozens of groups marched along Main Street of the village in the bicentennial parade, which was videotaped for later viewing. The Ouleout Valley Historical Society published Throughout the Years in the Town of Franklin 1792-1992.

The Franklin Stage Company currently occupies Chapel Hall (once part of the Delaware Literary Institute) located at 25 Institute Street. Since 1997, the Franklin Stage Company has done extensive renovations to the building and also raised money through foundations and government grants to support their work. The Stage Company is funded in part by the New York State Council on the Arts.

Since late 2001 the Greater Franklin Chamber of Commerce has maintained a website, which serves as a central community hub for information and news.
