= Hamden, New York =

- Town
- Location within the state of New York
- Coordinates: 42°11′34.18″N 74°59′33.36″W
- Country: United States
- State: New York
- County: Delaware
- Founded: April 4, 1825 (as Hampden)

Government
  - Type: Town Council
  - Town Supervisor: Wayne Marshfield (D)
  - Town Council: Members' List: • Daniel Liddle (R); • Steven Reed (R); • Ryan D. Kilmer (R); • Richard Smith (R)

Area
  - Total: 60.13 sq mi (155.73 km^{2})
  - Land: 59.86 sq mi (155.03 km^{2})
  - Water: 0.27 sq mi (0.70 km^{2})
- Elevation: 1,270 ft (387 m)

Population (2020)
  - Total: 1,137
- Time zone: UTC-5 (EST)
  - Summer (DST): UTC-6 (EDT)
- ZIP Codes: 13782 (Hamden); 13752 (Delancey); 13856 (Walton)
- Area code: 607
- FIPS code: 36-025-31698
- GNIS feature ID: 0979037
- Website: www.hamdenny.com

Hamden is a town in Delaware County, New York, United States. The population was 1,137 at the 2020 census.

== History ==
The town was created as the "Town of Hampden" in 1825 from the towns of Delhi and Walton. The current spelling of the name was adopted in 1826.

The first mention of a baseball game in an American newspaper was for a game to be played in Hamden:

The following notice appears in the July 13‚ 1825 edition of the Delhi Gazette: "The undersigned‚ all residents of the new town of Hamden‚ with the exception of Asa Howland‚ who has recently removed to Delhi‚ challenge an equal number of persons of any town in the County of Delaware‚ to meet them at any time at the house of Edward B. Chace‚ in said town‚ to play the game of Bass-Ball‚ for the sum of one dollar each per game." (as noted by Tom Heitz and John Thorn).

The Hamden Covered Bridge and Schoolhouse No. 5 are listed on the National Register of Historic Places.

Borden's Condensed Milk Company in Hamden, NY, 1908

== Geography ==
The town is located in the center of Delaware County. According to the United States Census Bureau, the town has a total area of 60.2 square miles (155.9 km^{2}), of which 59.9 square miles (155.2 km^{2}) is land and 0.3 square miles (0.7 km^{2}), or 0.45%, is water.

The West Branch Delaware River flows across the center of the town. The town is served by NY State Highway 10, and Delaware County Highways 2 and 26. The Hamden Hill Ridge Riders Snowmobile Club is a major attraction in the winter, and the maintainers of NYS Snowmobile Corridor #2, which bisects the town. Hamden Town Hall is on NYS Highway 10 at the junction of County Rt. 2.

Fire and ambulance protection is provided by the Town of Delhi. The town does have a small Highway Department. The town Center has a bank, and a couple small businesses, and there is a filling station and convenience store, north of the Town Center on Rt. 10.

== Demographics ==
Historical population
Census	Pop.	Note	%±
1830	1,210		—
1840	1,469		21.4%
1850	1,919		30.6%
1860	1,851		−3.5%
1870	1,762		−4.8%
1880	1,496		−15.1%
1890	1,507		0.7%
1900	1,378		−8.6%
1910	1,373		−0.4%
1920	1,248		−9.1%
1930	1,171		−6.2%
1940	1,177		0.5%
1950	1,114		−5.4%
1960	1,108		−0.5%
1970	1,169		5.5%
1980	1,276		9.2%
1990	1,144		−10.3%
2000	1,280		11.9%
2010	1,323		3.4%
2020	1,137		−14.1%
U.S. Decennial Census

As of the census of 2000, there were 1,280 people, 541 households, and 366 families residing in the town. The population density was 21.4 inhabitants per square mile (8.3/km^{2}). There were 902 housing units at an average density of 15.1 per square mile (5.8/km^{2}). The racial makeup of the town was 97.66% White, 0.16% African American, 1.17% Native American, 0.31% from other races, and 0.70% from two or more races. Hispanic or Latino of any race were 1.09% of the population.

There were 541 households, out of which 26.8% had children under the age of 18 living with them, 53.0% were married couples living together, 9.2% had a female householder with no husband present, and 32.3% were non-families. 28.3% of all households were made up of individuals, and 12.2% had someone living alone who was 65 years of age or older. The average household size was 2.35 and the average family size was 2.86.

In the town, the population was spread out, with 23.9% under the age of 18, 5.5% from 18 to 24, 24.3% from 25 to 44, 28.2% from 45 to 64, and 18.0% who were 65 years of age or older. The median age was 43 years. For every 100 females, there were 99.4 males. For every 100 females age 18 and over, there were 92.5 males.

The median income for a household in the town was $35,313, and the median income for a family was $43,571. Males had a median income of $26,776 versus $21,652 for females. The per capita income for the town was $19,754. About 10.7% of families and 10.4% of the population were below the poverty line, including 10.7% of those under age 18 and 7.9% of those age 65 or over.

== Communities and locations in Hamden ==
- De Lancey – A hamlet located by the corner of CR-2 and NY-10.
- Hamden – A hamlet located on NY-10.
- Hawleys – A hamlet located south of Hamden on NY-10.
- Mundale – A hamlet located northwest of Hamden.
