= Kelly Round Barn =

- U.S. National Register of Historic Places
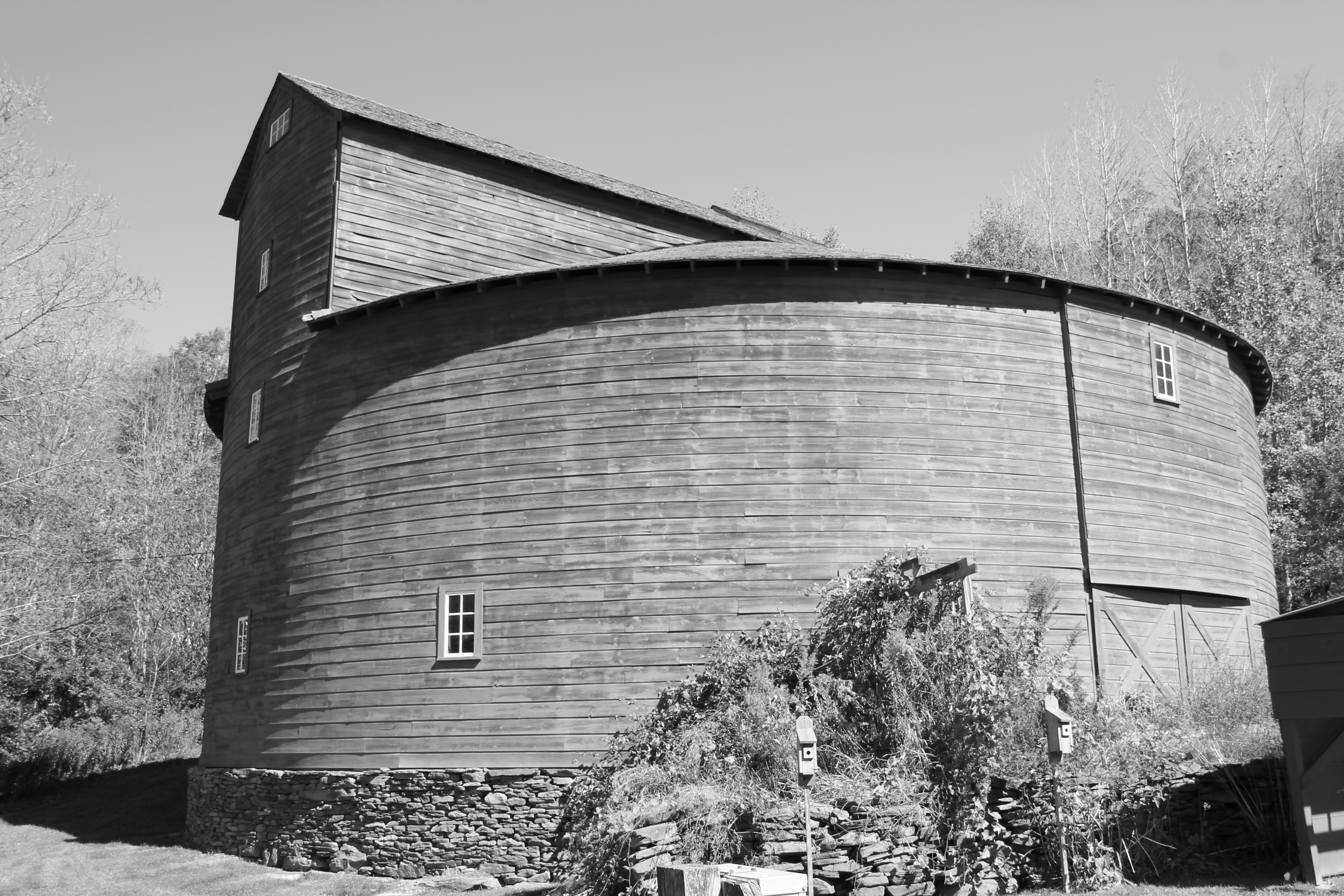

- Location within New York Location within the United States
- Nearest city: Halcottsville, New York
- Coordinates: 42°12′1″N 74°35′48″W
- Area: 2 acres (0.81 ha)
- Built: 1893
- Architect: Whimple, Jason
- Architectural style: Round Barn
- MPS: Central Plan Dairy Barns of New York TR
- NRHP reference No.: 84003857
- Added to NRHP: September 29, 1984

Kelly Round Barn is a historic round barn located near Halcottsville in Delaware County, New York, United States. It was built in 1899 and is a two-story structure with a low conical roof, approximately 90 feet in diameter. It features a central silo.

It was listed on the National Register of Historic Places in 1984.

== History ==
The Kelly Round Barn was built in 1899 by the Kelly brothers, Hiram, David, Norman and George as a milking barn. In 1915, it was sold to the Meade family who operated it until the 1960s. In 1981, it was donated to the Erpf Catskill Cultural Center by Alta Industries, which reconstructed the deteriorated barn in 1988. The barn has been the site of the Pakatakan Farmers Market since 1996.

The 90-foot diameter barn was built with oak timber and set on a stone foundation constructed by local mason Henry Sanford. It is one of the first and only existing round barns to have a fully operational silo located in the center. Gravity was used to push the hay to the bottom after being loaded from the top. As many as 51 cows were lined around the perimeter on the bottom so they could graze while they were milked. This represented the technological advance of efficiency.

== See also ==
- National Register of Historic Places listings in Delaware County, New York
