= Meredith, New York =

- Town
- Location within the state of New York
- Coordinates: 42°22′24″N 74°56′27″W
- Country: United States
- State: New York
- County: Delaware

Government
  - Type: Town Council
  - Town Supervisor: James Ellis
  - Town Council: Members' List: • Ronald Bailey (D); • Daniel Birbaum (D); • Paul Menke (D); • John Janiszewski (D)

Area
  - Total: 58.32 sq mi (151.04 km^{2})
  - Land: 58.10 sq mi (150.48 km^{2})
  - Water: 0.21 sq mi (0.55 km^{2})
- Elevation: 1,982 ft (604 m)

Population (2020)
  - Total: 1,484
- Time zone: UTC-5 (Eastern (EST))
  - Summer (DST): UTC-4 (EDT)
- ZIP Codes: 13757 (East Meredith); 13806 (Meridale); 13753 (Delhi); 13846 (Treadwell); 13820 (Oneonta); 13739 (Bloomville)
- Area code: 607
- FIPS code: 36-025-46624
- GNIS feature ID: 0979210
- Website: www.townofmeredith.ny.gov

Meredith is a town in Delaware County, New York, United States. The population was 1,484 at the 2020 census. It is an interior town in the northern part of the county.

The town was named for Samuel Meredith.

== History ==
The town was formed in 1800 from parts of the towns of Franklin and Kortright.

The 2010 documentary film Windfall, about the proposed placement of a wind farm in the town, was shot in Meredith.

The MacDonald Farm was listed on the National Register of Historic Places in 1973.

== Geography ==
According to the United States Census Bureau, the town has a total area of 58.3 square miles (151.0 km^{2}), of which 58.1 square miles (150.5 km^{2}) is land and 0.2 square miles (0.6 km^{2}), or 0.37%, is water. The northern half of the town drains west via Ouleout Creek to the Susquehanna River at Unadilla, while the southern half of the town drains south via several streams to the West Branch Delaware River.

== Demographics ==
Historical population
Census	Pop.	Note	%±
1820	1,375		—
1830	1,655		20.4%
1840	1,640		−0.9%
1850	1,634		−0.4%
1860	1,630		−0.2%
1870	1,462		−10.3%
1880	1,563		6.9%
1890	1,555		−0.5%
1900	1,508		−3.0%
1910	1,393		−7.6%
1920	1,394		0.1%
1930	1,295		−7.1%
1940	1,182		−8.7%
1950	1,133		−4.1%
1960	1,112		−1.9%
1970	1,129		1.5%
1980	1,374		21.7%
1990	1,513		10.1%
2000	1,588		5.0%
2010	1,529		−3.7%
2020	1,484		−2.9%
U.S. Decennial Census

As of the census of 2000, there were 1,588 people, 612 households, and 438 families residing in the town. The population density was 27.3 inhabitants per square mile (10.5/km^{2}). There were 816 housing units at an average density of 14.0 per square mile (5.4/km^{2}). The racial makeup of the town was 98.36% White, 0.19% African American, 0.25% Native American, 0.38% Asian, 0.13% from other races, and 0.69% from two or more races. Hispanic or Latino of any race were 1.32% of the population.

There were 612 households, out of which 32.2% had children under the age of 18 living with them, 58.7% were married couples living together, 8.0% had a female householder with no husband present, and 28.4% were non-families. 22.2% of all households were made up of individuals, and 9.5% had someone living alone who was 65 years of age or older. The average household size was 2.59 and the average family size was 3.03.

In the town, the population was spread out, with 24.8% under the age of 18, 7.6% from 18 to 24, 27.1% from 25 to 44, 27.1% from 45 to 64, and 13.4% who were 65 years of age or older. The median age was 40 years. For every 100 females, there were 100.0 males. For every 100 females age 18 and over, there were 96.1 males.

The median income for a household in the town was $38,021, and the median income for a family was $43,102. Males had a median income of $27,917 versus $21,823 for females. The per capita income for the town was $19,715. About 9.2% of families and 14.2% of the population were below the poverty line, including 22.8% of those under age 18 and 8.8% of those age 65 or over.

== Communities and locations in Meredith ==
- East Meredith – Contains The Historic Hanford Mills Museum. The mill was listed on the National Register of Historic Places in 1973.
- Meridale – A hamlet on Route 28.
- Meredith Square -- Small hamlet located on the former Catskill Turnpike.
- West Meredith – The Amos Bristol Tavern and West Meredith Cemetery are listed on the National Register of Historic Places.
