= Second Old School Baptist Church of Roxbury =

Historic church in New York, United States

- U.S. National Register of Historic Places
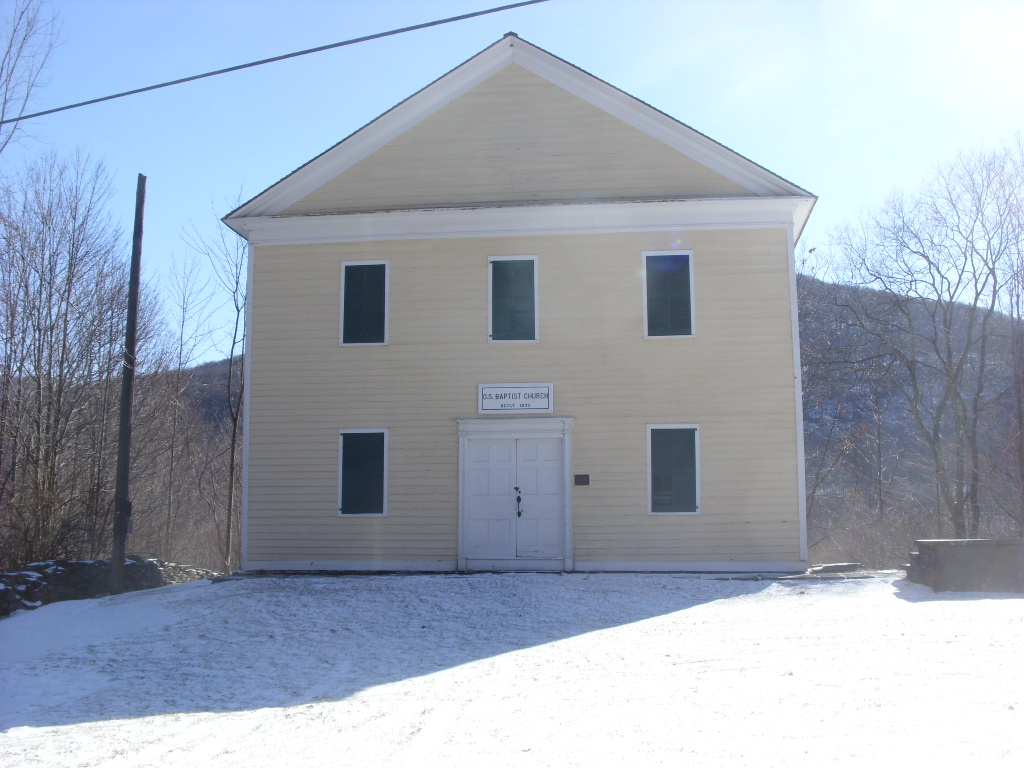
- Second Old School Baptist Church of Roxbury, February 2009

- Location within New York Location within the United States
- Location: Cty. Rd. 41, Roxbury, New York
- Coordinates: 42°15′53″N 74°35′43″W
- Area: less than one acre
- Built: 1832
- Architectural style: Federal
- NRHP reference No.: 99000908
- Added to NRHP: July 28, 1999

Second Old School Baptist Church of Roxbury is a historic Baptist church building on City Rd. 41 in Roxbury, Delaware County, New York. It is a 2-story, three-by-four-bay wood-frame building constructed in 1832–1833. The interior features a traditional meeting house plan. Also on the property is a small frame outhouse built about 1870, a three-step fieldstone carriage step, and cemetery.

It was added to the National Register of Historic Places in 1999.

== See also ==
- National Register of Historic Places listings in Delaware County, New York
