= Pinesville, New York =

- Hamlet
- Location within the state of New York
- Coordinates: 42°09′19″N 75°09′49″W
- Country: United States
- State: New York
- County: Delaware
- Town: Walton
- Elevation: 1,207 ft (368 m)
- Time zone: UTC-5 (Eastern (EST))
  - Summer (DST): UTC-4 (EDT)

Pinesville is a hamlet in Delaware County, New York. It is located west-southwest of Walton at the corner of NY–10 and Pines Brook Road. Pines Brook converges with the West Branch Delaware River south of Pinesville. The West Branch Delaware River flows west, south of the hamlet.
