= Odell Lake =

Odell Lake may refer to:

- Odell Lake (Arizona), a reservoir in Coconino County
- Odell Lake (New York), a lake in Delaware County
- Odell Lake, a lake near Big Prairie, Ohio
- Odell Lake (Oregon), a lake in Klamath County
- Odell Lake (video game), a 1986 educational computer game
