= Beers Brook =

Beers Brook may refer to:

- Beers Brook (East Brook)
- Beers Brook (West Branch Delaware River tributary)
