= Creamery Pond =

Lake in Delaware County, New York

- Location of Creamery Pond within New York
- Location: Delaware County, New York
- Coordinates: 42°24′14″N 74°47′42″W
- Primary outflows: Wright Brook
- Surface area: 2 acres (0.0031 mi^{2}; 0.81 ha)
- Surface elevation: 1,870 feet (570 m)
- Settlements: Bloomville

Creamery Pond is a small lake located north-northeast of Bloomville in Delaware County, New York. Creamery Pond drains southeast via Wright Brook which flows into the West Branch Delaware River.

== See also ==
- List of lakes in New York
