= Russ Gray Pond =

Small lake in New York, U.S.

- Location of Russ Gray Pond within New York
- Location: Delaware County, New York
- Coordinates: 42°07′20″N 75°05′44″W
- Primary inflows: Beers Brook
- Primary outflows: Beers Brook
- Basin countries: United States
- Surface area: 6 acres (2.4 ha)
- Surface elevation: 1,968 ft (600 m)
- Settlements: Beerston

Russ Gray Pond is a small lake east of Beerston in Delaware County, New York. It drains west via Beers Brook which flows into the West Branch Delaware River.

== See also ==
- List of lakes in New York
