= Lake Brook =

Lake Brook may refer to:

- Lake Brook (Otego Creek), in Otsego County, New York
- Lake Brook (West Branch Delaware River tributary), in Delaware County, New York
