= East Brook (West Branch Delaware River tributary) =

Location
- Country: United States
- State: New York

Physical characteristics
- Source
  - location: Delaware County, New York
- Mouth: West Branch Delaware River
  - location: Walton, New York, Delaware County, New York, United States
  - coordinates: 42°10′01″N 75°07′44″W
- Basin size: 24.9 mi^{2} (64 km^{2})

Basin features
- Tributaries
  - right: Crystal Brook, Beers Brook, Dry Brook

East Brook is a river in Delaware County, New York. It flows into the West Branch Delaware River by Walton, New York.
