= Beerston, New York =

- Hamlet
- Location within the state of New York
- Coordinates: 42°07′31″N 75°09′46″W
- Country: United States
- State: New York
- County: Delaware
- Town: Walton
- Elevation: 1,171 ft (357 m)
- Time zone: UTC-5 (Eastern (EST))
  - Summer (DST): UTC-4 (EDT)

Beerston is a hamlet in Delaware County, New York. It is located south-southwest of Walton at the corner of NY–10 and Beers Brook Road. Beers Brook converges with the West Branch Delaware River, which flows west through the hamlet.
