= Scott Township, Pennsylvania =

Scott Township is the name of some places in the U.S. state of Pennsylvania:

- Scott Township, Allegheny County, Pennsylvania
- Scott Township, Columbia County, Pennsylvania
- Scott Township, Lackawanna County, Pennsylvania
- Scott Township, Lawrence County, Pennsylvania
- Scott Township, Wayne County, Pennsylvania
