= Faulkner Brook =

Location
- Country: United States
- State: Pennsylvania

Physical characteristics
- Source
  - location: Wayne County, Pennsylvania
- Mouth: West Branch Delaware River
  - location: Balls Eddy, Pennsylvania, Wayne County, Pennsylvania, United States
  - coordinates: 41°59′00″N 75°20′36″W
  - elevation: 996 ft (304 m)
- Basin size: 2.19 mi^{2} (5.7 km^{2})

Faulkner Brook flows into the West Branch Delaware River by Balls Eddy, Pennsylvania.
