= Third Brook =

Location
- Country: United States
- State: New York

Physical characteristics
- Source
  - location: Delaware County, New York
- Mouth: West Brook
  - location: Walton, New York, Delaware County, New York, United States
  - coordinates: 42°10′03″N 75°08′16″W
- Basin size: 5.65 mi^{2} (14.6 km^{2})

Third Brook flows into West Brook by Walton, New York.
