= Moore Hill =

Mountain in New York, United States

- Location within New York Adirondack Park Location within the United States

Highest point
- Elevation: 2,342 feet (714 m)
- Coordinates: 42°25′39″N 74°32′19″W

Geography
- Location: NE of South Gilboa, New York, U.S.
- Topo map: USGS Stamford

Moore Hill is a mountain in Schoharie County, New York. It is located northeast of South Gilboa. Blenheim Hill is located north and Bald Mountain is located west-southwest of Moore Hill.
