= Kidd Brook =

Location
- Country: United States
- State: New York

Physical characteristics
- Source
  - location: Delaware County, New York
- Mouth: West Branch Delaware River
  - location: Bloomville, New York, Delaware County, New York, United States
  - coordinates: 42°18′28″N 74°50′55″W
- Basin size: 5.13 mi^{2} (13.3 km^{2})

Kidd Brook is a small brook residing near Bloomville, New York. The stream flows south into the West Branch Delaware River.
