= Wakeman Brook =

- Location of the mouth of Wakeman Brook

Location
- Country: United States
- State: New York
- County: Delaware

Physical characteristics
- Source
  - coordinates: 42°07′58″N 75°10′50″W
- Mouth: West Branch Delaware River
  - coordinates: 42°06′00″N 75°11′51″W
  - elevation: 1,184 ft (361 m)

Basin features
- Tributaries
  - left: Johnnie Brook

Wakeman Brook is a river in Delaware County, New York. It flows into the West Branch Delaware River southwest of Walton. It was formally called "Johnnie Brook".
