= Betty Brook =

Betty Brook may refer to:

- Betty Brook (West Kill tributary), in New York
- Betty Brook (West Branch Delaware River tributary), in New York
- Betty Brook, in New Hampshire, featured on New Hampshire historical marker no. 284
