= Balls Creek (West Branch Delaware River tributary) =

Location
- Country: United States
- State: Pennsylvania

Physical characteristics
- Source
  - location: Wayne County, Pennsylvania
- Mouth: West Branch Delaware River
  - location: Balls Eddy, Pennsylvania, Wayne County, Pennsylvania, United States
  - coordinates: 41°58′12″N 75°20′07″W
- Basin size: 15.2 mi^{2} (39 km^{2})

Balls Creek flows into the West Branch Delaware River by Balls Eddy, Pennsylvania.
