= Kiff Brook =

Location
- Country: United States
- State: New York

Physical characteristics
- Source
  - location: Delaware County, New York
- Mouth: West Branch Delaware River
  - location: Bloomville, New York, Delaware County, New York, United States
  - coordinates: 42°19′59″N 74°46′48″W
- Basin size: 3.02 mi^{2} (7.8 km^{2})

Kiff Brook flows into the West Branch Delaware River by Bloomville, New York.
