= West Brook (West Branch Delaware River tributary) =

- Location of mouth within New York West Brook (West Branch Delaware River tributary) (the United States)

Location
- Country: United States
- State: New York
- County: Delaware

Physical characteristics
- Source
  - location: Delaware County, New York
  - coordinates: 42°16′23″N 75°09′05″W
- Mouth: West Branch Delaware River
  - location: Walton
  - coordinates: 42°10′01″N 75°08′17″W
  - elevation: 1,181 ft (360 m)
- Basin size: 28.2 sq mi (73 km^{2})
- Discharge
  - location: Walton
  - minimum: 3.2 cu ft/s (0.091 m^{3}/s)
  - maximum: 804 cu ft/s (22.8 m^{3}/s)

Basin features
- Tributaries
  - right: Kerrs Creek, Third Brook

West Brook flows into the West Branch Delaware River by Walton, New York.

== Hydrology ==
The United States Geological Survey (USGS) maintains one stream gauge along West Brook, located in Austin Lincoln Park, one mile (1.6 km) upstream from the mouth. The station in operation since 2017, had a maximum discharge of 804 cubic feet (22.8 m^{3}) per second on August 14, 2018, and a minimum discharge of 3.2 cubic feet (0.091 m^{3}) per second on July 21–22, 2018.
