= Wright Brook =

Location
- Country: United States
- State: New York
- County: Delaware

Physical characteristics
- Source: Creamery Pond
  - location: SW of Kortright Center
  - coordinates: 42°24′11″N 74°47′41″W
  - elevation: 1,870 ft (570 m)
- Mouth: West Branch Delaware River
  - location: S of Bloomville, New York
  - coordinates: 42°19′43″N 74°48′19″W
  - elevation: 1,424 ft (434 m)
- Basin size: 12 sq mi (31 km^{2})

Wright Brook is a river in Delaware County, New York. It drains Creamery Pond and flows south before converging with the West Branch Delaware River south of Bloomville.
