= Weeds Brook =

- Location of the mouth of Weeds Brook

Location
- Country: United States
- State: New York
- County: Delaware

Physical characteristics
- Source
  - coordinates: 42°08′28″N 75°03′13″W
- Mouth: West Branch Delaware River
  - coordinates: 42°09′37″N 75°04′21″W
  - elevation: 1,217 ft (371 m)

Weeds Brook is a river in Delaware County, New York. It flows into the West Branch Delaware River east of Walton.
