= Kortright, New York =

- Town
- Location within the state of New York
- Coordinates: 42°24′4″N 74°47′35″W
- Country: United States
- State: New York
- County: Delaware

Government
  - Type: Town Council
  - Town Supervisor: George Haynes, Jr. (R)
  - Town Council: Members' List: • Carol S. Dibble (R); • Eric Haynes (D); • John Every (R); • Margaret Kenyon (R)

Area
  - Total: 62.63 sq mi (162.22 km^{2})
  - Land: 62.45 sq mi (161.75 km^{2})
  - Water: 0.18 sq mi (0.47 km^{2})
- Elevation: 1,785 ft (544 m)

Population (2020)
  - Total: 1,544
- Time zone: UTC-5 (Eastern (EST))
  - Summer (DST): UTC-4 (EDT)
- ZIP Codes: 13739 (Bloomville); 13842 (South Kortright); 13750 (Davenport); 13757 (East Meredith); 13788 (Hobart)
- Area code: 607
- FIPS code: 36-025-40068
- GNIS feature ID: 0979123

Kortright is a town in Delaware County, New York, United States. The population was 1,544 at the 2020 census. The town is in the northern part of the county.

== History ==
Kortright was formed from the town of Harpersfield in 1793.

The West Kortright Presbyterian Church was listed on the National Register of Historic Places in 2002.

== Geography ==
According to the United States Census Bureau, the town has a total area of 62.6 square miles (162.2 km^{2}), of which 62.4 square miles (161.7 km^{2}) is land and 0.2 square miles (0.5 km^{2}) or 0.29%, is water. The West Branch Delaware River forms the southern border of the town and drains more than half of its area. The northern part of the town drains via Kortright Creek and Charlotte Creek to the Susquehanna River at Oneonta.

== Demographics ==
Historical population
Census	Pop.	Note	%±
1820	2,548		—
1830	2,873		12.8%
1840	2,441		−15.0%
1850	2,181		−10.7%
1860	2,023		−7.2%
1870	1,812		−10.4%
1880	1,730		−4.5%
1890	1,588		−8.2%
1900	1,475		−7.1%
1910	1,481		0.4%
1920	1,559		5.3%
1930	1,340		−14.0%
1940	1,288		−3.9%
1950	1,239		−3.8%
1960	1,073		−13.4%
1970	1,236		15.2%
1980	1,250		1.1%
1990	1,410		12.8%
2000	1,633		15.8%
2010	1,675		2.6%
2020	1,544		−7.8%
U.S. Decennial Census

As of the census of 2000, there were 1,633 people, 597 households, and 417 families residing in the town. The population density was 26.1 inhabitants per square mile (10.1/km^{2}). There were 994 housing units at an average density of 15.9 per square mile (6.1/km^{2}). The racial makeup of the town was 91.12% White, 5.82% African American, 0.37% Native American, 0.43% Asian, 1.16% from other races, and 1.10% from two or more races. Hispanic or Latino of any race were 3.31% of the population.

There were 597 households, out of which 30.5% had children under the age of 18 living with them, 57.5% were married couples living together, 8.4% had a female householder with no husband present, and 30.0% were non-families. 24.1% of all households were made up of individuals, and 11.4% had someone living alone who was 65 years of age or older. The average household size was 2.55 and the average family size was 2.97.

In the town, the population was spread out, with 30.3% under the age of 18, 5.6% from 18 to 24, 23.7% from 25 to 44, 25.0% from 45 to 64, and 15.4% who were 65 years of age or older. The median age was 37 years. For every 100 females, there were 110.4 males. For every 100 females age 18 and over, there were 96.7 males.

The median income for a household in the town was $33,490, and the median income for a family was $37,784. Males had a median income of $23,200 versus $21,389 for females. The per capita income for the town was $15,107. About 10.3% of families and 12.6% of the population were below the poverty line, including 22.5% of those under age 18 and 5.9% of those age 65 or over.

== Communities and locations in Kortright ==
- Bloomville – A hamlet on NY 10. The Bloomville Methodist Episcopal Church and McArthur-Martin Hexadecagon Barn are listed on the National Register of Historic Places.
- Doonans Corners – The eastern terminus of CR 12 at CR 33. The location features a private residence that was formerly a rural schoolhouse before the centralization of the South Kortright school district in 1939.
- Kortright Center – A location on CR 33. The former Gilchrist Presbyterian Church (now a Pentecostal church), built in the early 19th century, stands here.
- Kortright Station – A general area covered by the Kortright Rural Fire District along CR 12.
