= Kerrs Creek =

Location
- Country: United States
- State: New York

Physical characteristics
- Source
  - location: Delaware County, New York
- Mouth: West Brook
  - location: Walton, New York, Delaware County, New York, United States
  - coordinates: 42°11′50″N 75°07′22″W
- Basin size: 7.55 mi^{2} (19.6 km^{2})

Kerrs Creek flows into the West Brook by Walton, New York.
