= Woodchuck Hill (Jefferson, New York) =

Mountain in New York, United States

- Location within New York Adirondack Park Location within the United States

Highest point
- Elevation: 2,680 feet (820 m)
- Coordinates: 42°27′44″N 74°36′12″W

Geography
- Location: Jefferson, Schoharie County, New York, U.S.
- Parent range: Catskill Mountains
- Topo map: USGS Stamford

Woodchuck Hill is a mountain in Jefferson, Schoharie County, New York. It is located northwest of South Gilboa. Mount Jefferson is located west-southwest of Woodchuck Hill. The headwaters of the West Branch Delaware River are on its southeastern flank, between itself and Mine Hill.
