= Bobs Brook =

- Location of the mouth of Bobs Brook

Location
- Country: United States
- State: New York
- County: Delaware

Physical characteristics
- Source
  - coordinates: 42°10′27″N 75°12′04″W
- Mouth: West Branch Delaware River
  - coordinates: 42°08′56″N 75°10′20″W
  - elevation: 1,158 ft (353 m)

Bobs Brook is a river in Delaware County, New York. It flows into the West Branch Delaware River southwest of Walton.
