= Blenheim Hill =

Mountain in New York, United States

- Location within New York Adirondack Park Location within the United States

Highest point
- Elevation: 2,064 feet (629 m)
- Coordinates: 42°28′09″N 74°32′41″W

Geography
- Location: NNE of South Gilboa, New York, U.S.
- Topo map: USGS Stamford

Blenheim Hill is a mountain in Schoharie County, New York. It is located north-northeast of South Gilboa. Moore Hill is located south and Mine Hill is located southwest of Blenheim Hill.
