= Rose Brook =

Location
- Country: United States
- State: New York

Physical characteristics
- Source
  - location: Delaware County, New York
- Mouth: West Branch Delaware River
  - location: Bloomville, New York, Delaware County, New York, United States
  - coordinates: 42°20′22″N 74°45′23″W
- Basin size: 14.9 mi^{2} (39 km^{2})

Rose Brook flows into the West Branch Delaware River by Bloomville, New York.
