= McArthur-Martin Hexadecagon Barn =

- U.S. National Register of Historic Places
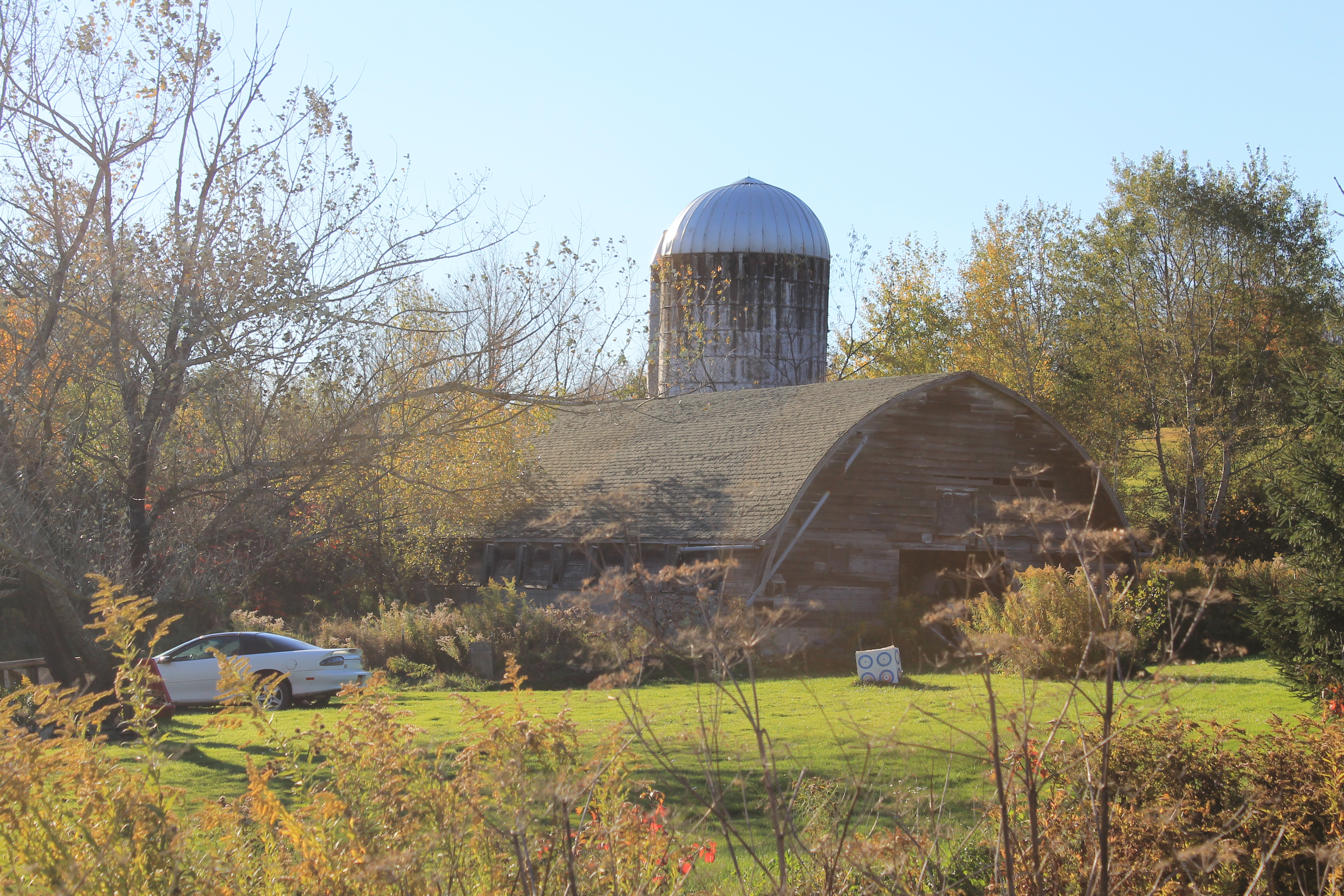
- McArthur-Martin Barn, Bloomville NY

- Location within New York Location within the United States
- Nearest city: Bloomville, New York
- Coordinates: 42°22′18″N 74°46′51″W
- Area: less than one acre
- Built: 1883
- Architect: McArthur, John W.; Muir, John
- Architectural style: Hexadecagon
- MPS: Central Plan Dairy Barns of New York TR
- NRHP reference No.: 84002237
- Added to NRHP: September 29, 1984

McArthur-Martin Hexadecagon Barn is a historic barn located at Bloomville in Delaware County, New York, United States. It includes the 16-sided portion of the barn, calf wing and driveway, driveway ramp with stone embankment, two round silos and a frame addition. The barn was built in 1883 and is a three-story frame structure, 100 feet in diameter.

It was listed on the National Register of Historic Places in 1984.

== See also ==
- National Register of Historic Places listings in Delaware County, New York

It meets definition of a round barn, being nearly round.
