= Johnnie Brook =

- Location of the mouth of Johnnie Brook

Location
- Country: United States
- State: New York
- County: Delaware

Physical characteristics
- Source
  - coordinates: 42°07′27″N 75°12′12″W
- Mouth: Wakeman Brook
  - coordinates: 42°06′20″N 75°11′47″W
  - elevation: 1,247 ft (380 m)

Johnnie Brook is a river in Delaware County, New York. It flows into Wakeman Brook north of Rock Rift.
