= Beers Brook (East Brook tributary) =

Location
- Country: United States
- State: New York

Physical characteristics
- Source
  - location: Delaware County, New York
- Mouth: East Brook
  - location: Walton, New York, Delaware County, New York, United States
  - coordinates: 42°14′16″N 75°04′00″W
  - elevation: 1,446 ft (441 m)

Beers Brook flows into the East Brook northeast of Walton, New York.
