= Watauga Falls =

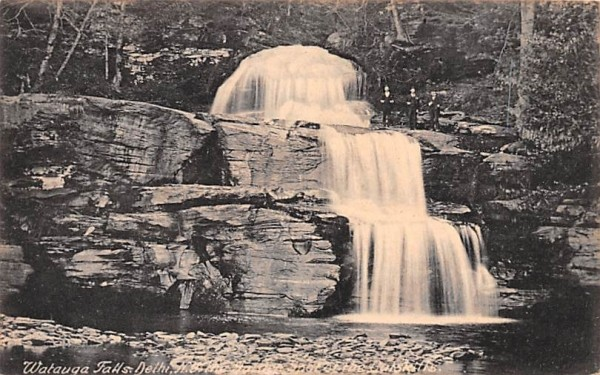

- Location within New York
- Location: Delaware County, New York
- Coordinates: 42°18′01″N 74°54′21″W
- Elevation: 1,506 ft (459 m)
- Watercourse: Falls Creek

Watauga Falls is a waterfall in Delaware County, New York. It is located northeast of Delhi on Falls Creek.

In 1898 the falls were described as having three tiers, the lowest 55 feet (17 m), the middle 42 feet (13 m), and the top 38 feet (12 m) high.

== See also ==
- List of waterfalls
