= Butler Brook =

River in Delaware County, New York

- Location of the mouth of Butler Brook

Location
- Country: United States
- State: New York
- County: Delaware

Physical characteristics
- Source
  - coordinates: 42°06′53″N 75°25′13″W
- Mouth: West Branch Delaware River
  - coordinates: 42°03′30″N 75°25′21″W
  - elevation: 971 ft (296 m)

Butler Brook is a river in Delaware County, New York. It flows into the West Branch Delaware River northeast of Deposit.
