= Town Brook (West Branch Delaware River tributary) =

Location
- Country: United States
- State: New York

Physical characteristics
- Source
  - location: Delaware County, New York
- Mouth: West Branch Delaware River
  - location: Hobart, New York, Delaware County, New York, United States
  - coordinates: 42°22′17″N 74°40′40″W
- Basin size: 16.1 mi^{2} (42 km^{2})

Town Brook flows into the West Branch Delaware River by Hobart, New York.
