= Parker 13-Sided Barn =

- U.S. National Register of Historic Places
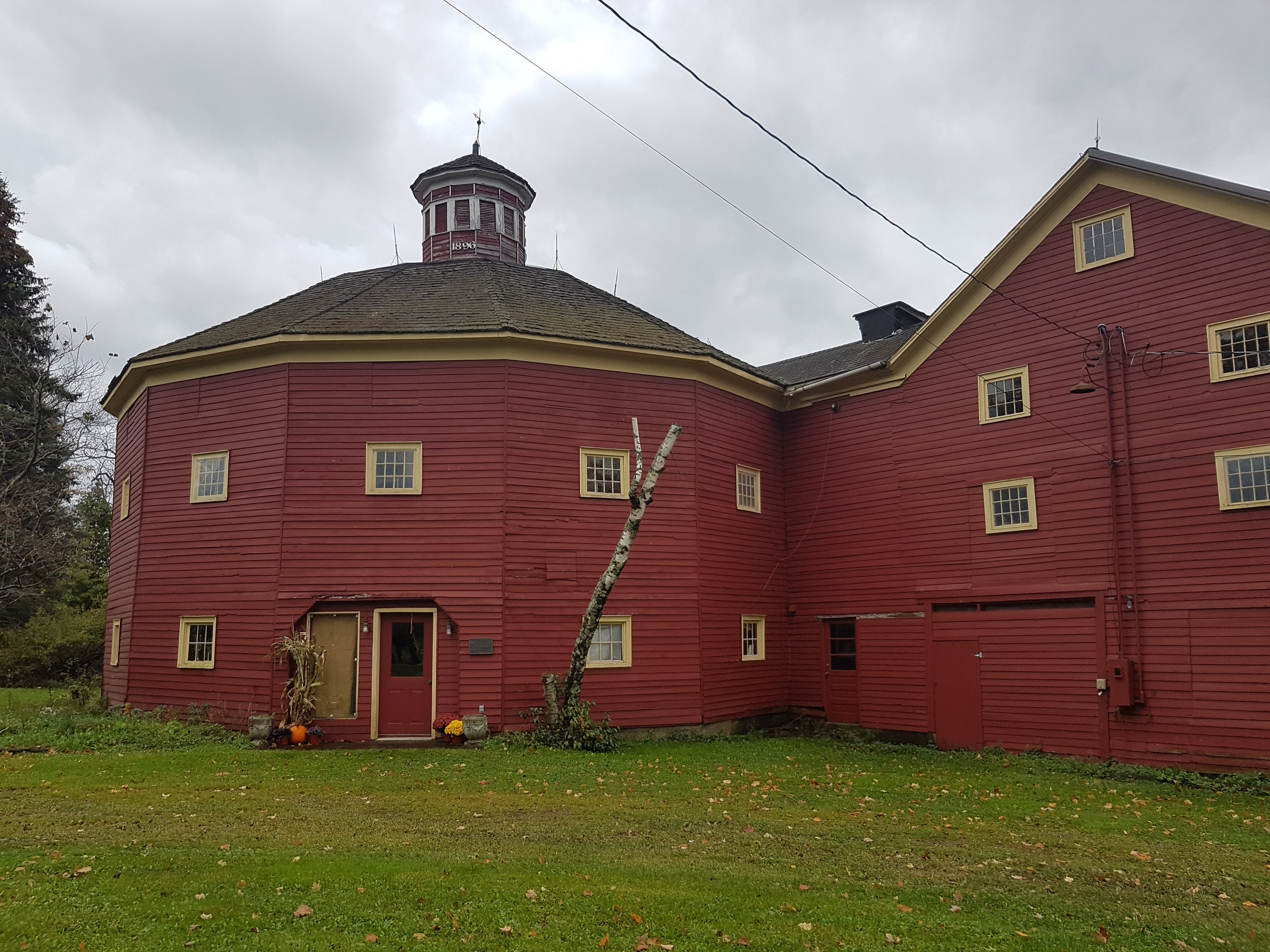
- Parker 13-Sided Barn

- Location within New York Location within the United States
- Nearest city: Jefferson, New York
- Coordinates: 42°28′51″N 74°36′17″W
- Area: less than one acre
- Built: 1896
- Architectural style: 13-sided
- MPS: Central Plan Dairy Barns of New York TR
- NRHP reference No.: 84002967
- Added to NRHP: September 29, 1984

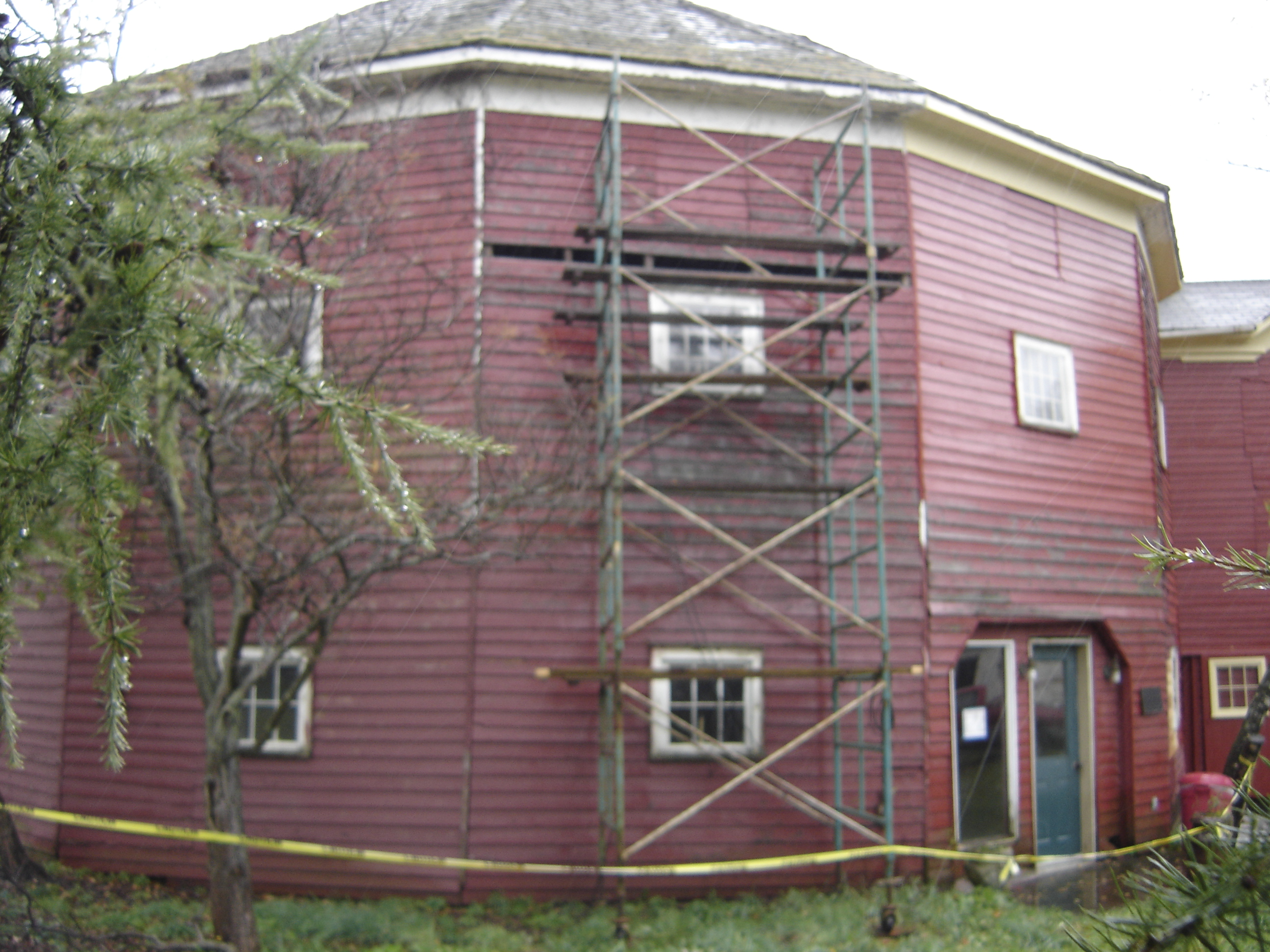

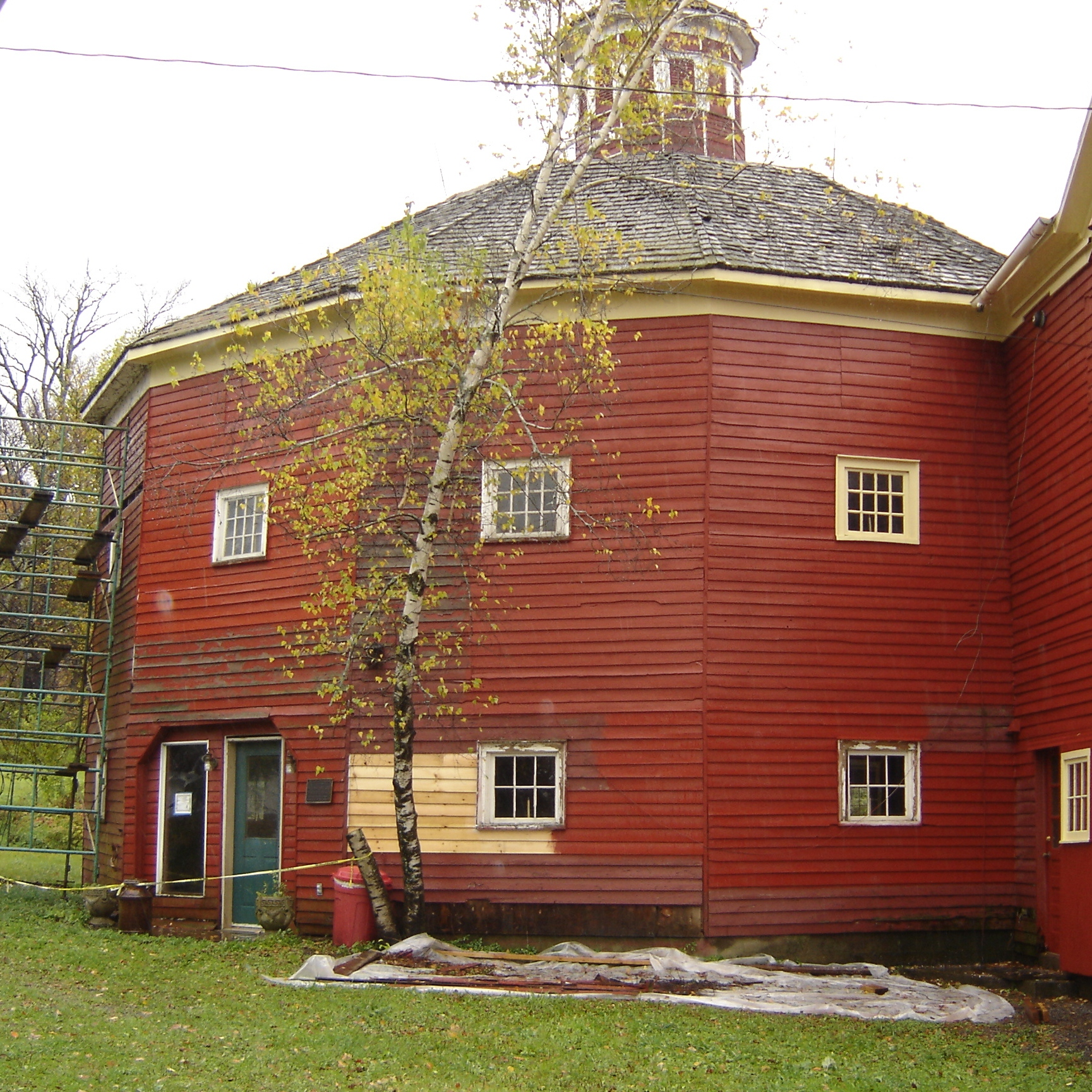

Parker 13-Sided Barn is an officially registered historic barn nestled in the hamlet of Jefferson in Schoharie County, New York. It is located on State Route 10 between Harpersfield and Stamford. The barn has a long and colorful history, built in 1896 and one of only two 13-sided barns listed in the National Register of Historic Places in this area of New York state. It meets the definition of being a round barn.

The Parker Barn is a three-story structure, 60 feet in diameter and was built by Mr. Richtmyer Hubbell over a century ago. The roof is double hipped which is topped by a 13-sided cupola. A longtime resident of Schoharie County, Charles Hubbell has fond memories being Grandson to the builder, and born at the homestead which surrounds this property. The homestead also consists of a late 19th-century, three-story, rectangular barn adjacent and directly connected to the 13-sided barn by a hyphen, as well as a Victorian style Farmhouse situated on 15 acres just outside the Catskill Mountain range.

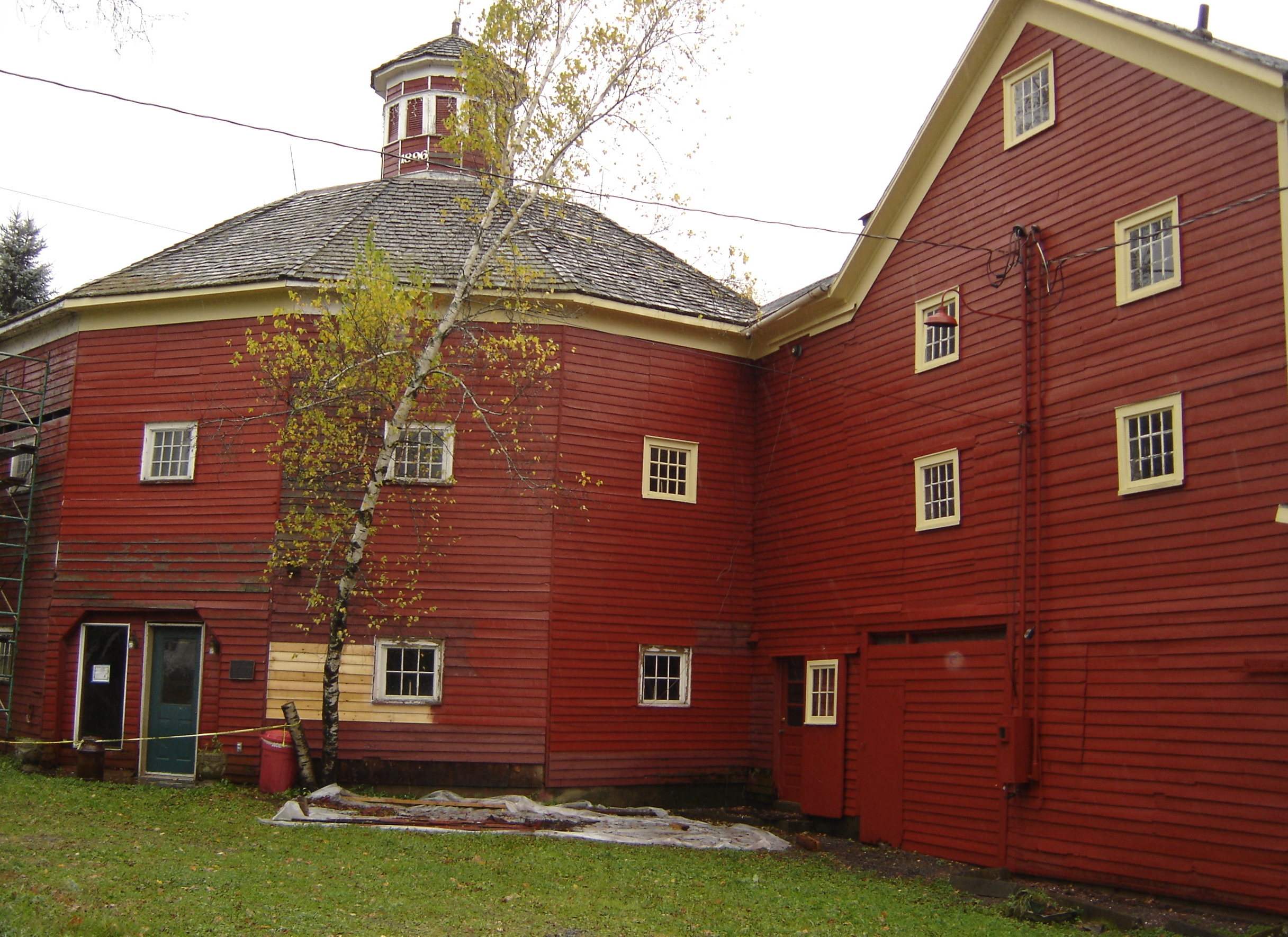

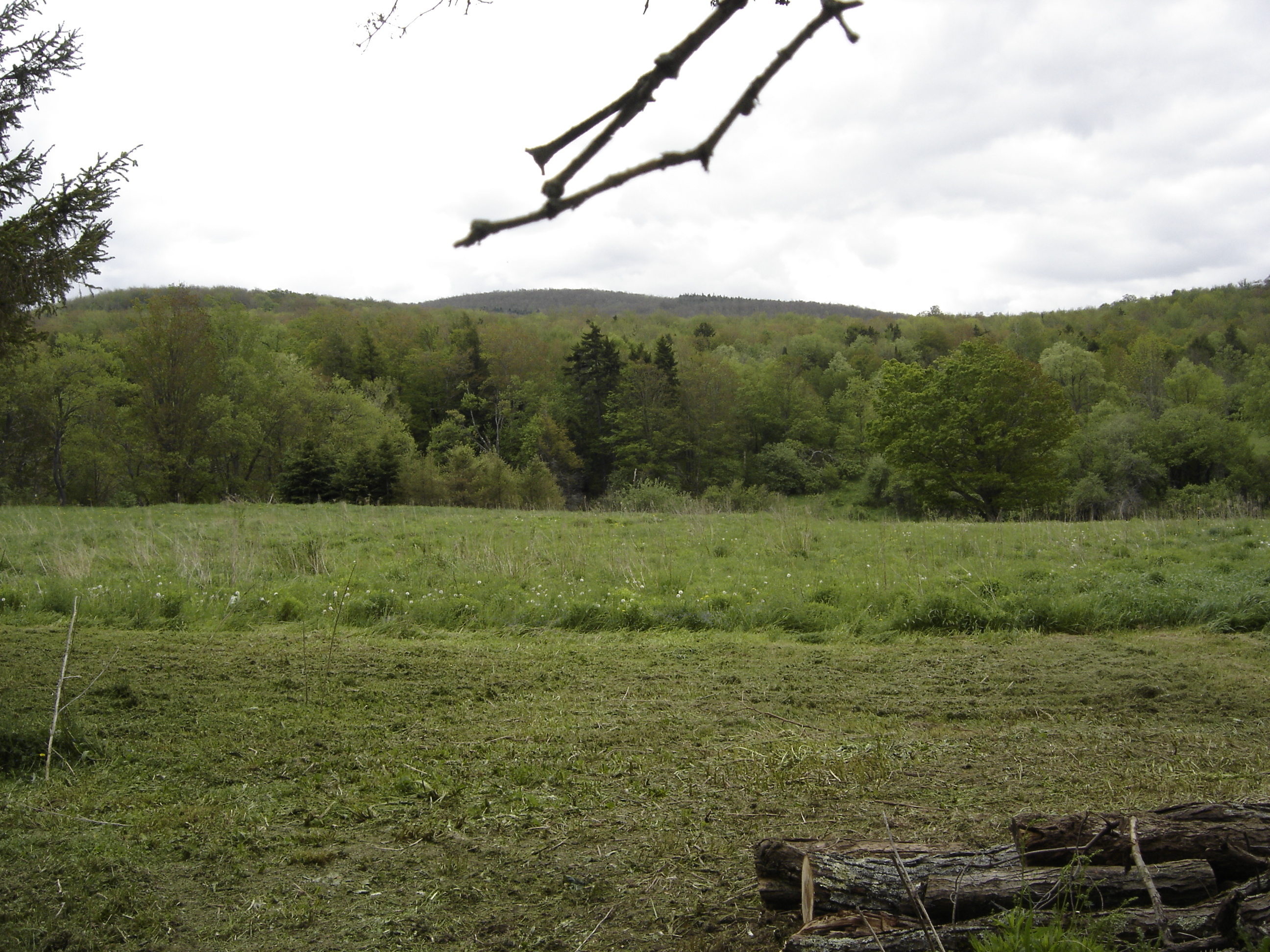

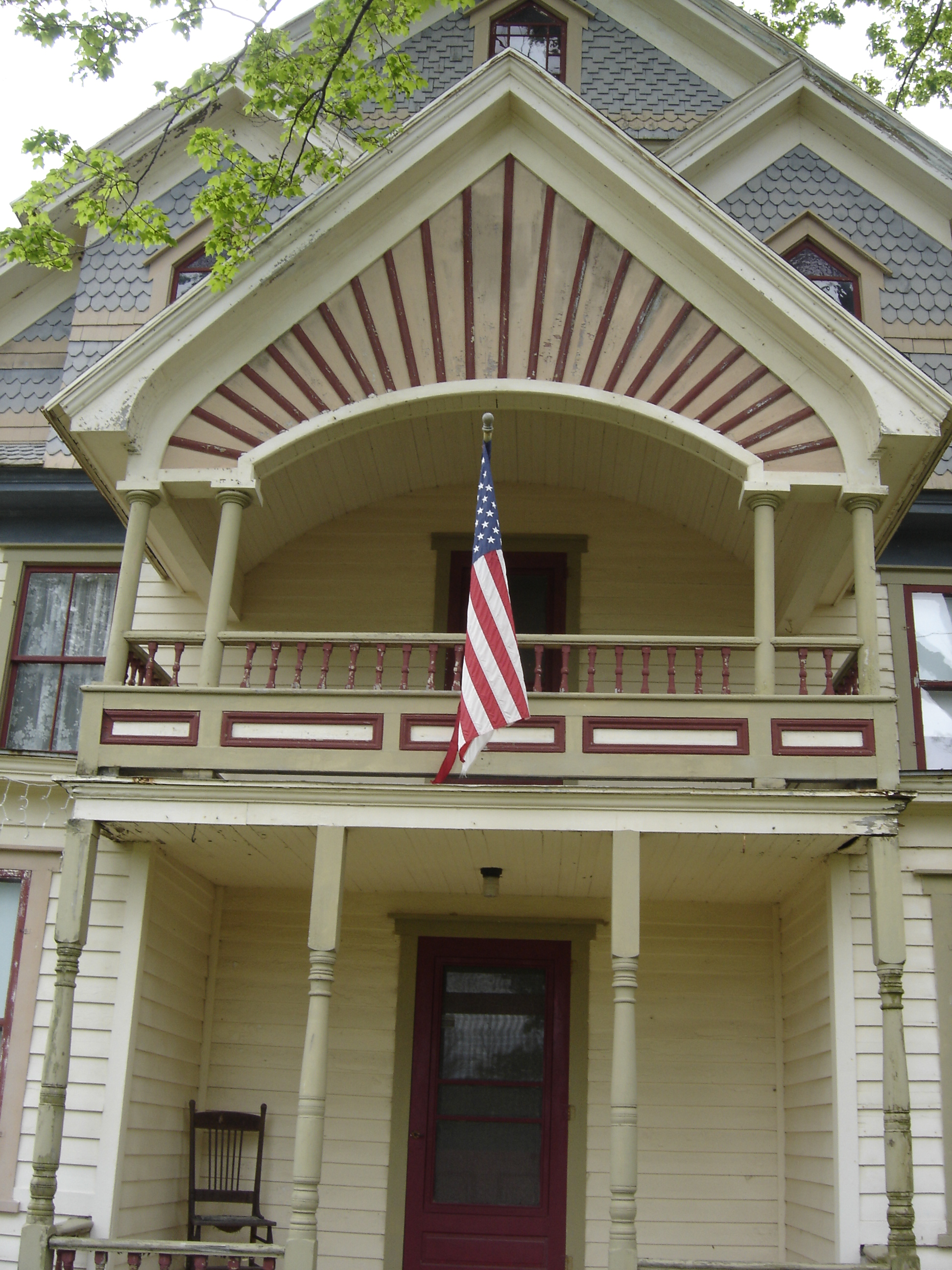

Over the decades, the site had been used as a Dairy barn housing cows, a chicken barn and finally a veal operation during its farming life. The 13 sided barn was originally constructed to house cows who supplied their milk to the two creameries located in the Village of Jefferson. "The cows were kept in stalls on the first floor of the barn and horses pulled wagons of hay to the second story via a bridge which led to large doors on the east side. (No longer in use.) After the hay was unloaded, the horses would then be led forward around the inside of the barn and through to the same doors they entered. This was far less dangerous than having the horses back out through doors to maneuver the steep bridge, especially during severe winters."

The Parker Barn was named such for its owner William Parker Sr. at which time the landmark registration was filed. Over 30 years ago, Mr. Parker was raising veal and had undertaken an extensive revitalizing of the barn. This sparked the interest of the National Registry to list the building.

The barn is currently privately owned and is slowly being renovated again not only to honor past generations of families who have labored, but for generations of families to come. The goal is to eventually open the barn to the public as well as opening visitors to the history that thrives in small town America.

It was listed on the National Register of Historic Places in 1984.
