= Travis Brook =

- Location of the mouth of Travis Brook

Location
- Country: United States
- State: New York
- County: Delaware

Physical characteristics
- Source
  - coordinates: 42°00′37″N 75°19′49″W
- Mouth: West Branch Delaware River
  - coordinates: 41°59′41″N 75°20′35″W
  - elevation: 935 ft (285 m)

Travis Brook is a river in Delaware County, New York. It flows into the West Branch Delaware River northwest of Hancock.
