= Mallory Brook =

Location
- Country: United States
- State: New York

Physical characteristics
- Source
  - location: Delaware County, New York
- Mouth: West Branch Delaware River
  - location: Hawleys, New York, Delaware County, New York, United States
  - coordinates: 42°09′50″N 75°00′19″W
  - elevation: 1,480 ft (450 m)
- Basin size: 1.85 mi^{2} (4.8 km^{2})

Mallory Brook flows into the West Branch Delaware River by Hawleys, New York, United States.
