= Odell Lake (New York) =

Lake in Delaware County, New York, United States

- Location of Odell Lake within New York
- Location: Delaware County, New York
- Coordinates: 42°25′21″N 74°41′26″W
- Primary outflows: Lake Brook
- Basin countries: United States
- Surface area: 29 acres (12 ha)
- Surface elevation: 2,051 ft (625 m)
- Settlements: Hobart

Odell Lake is a small lake located north-northwest of Hobart in Delaware County, New York. It drains south via Lake Brook which flows into the West Branch Delaware River. Gunhouse Hill is located west of Odell Lake.

== See also ==
- List of lakes in New York
