= Peaks Brook =

Location
- Country: United States
- State: New York

Physical characteristics
- Source
  - location: Delaware County, New York
- Mouth: West Branch Delaware River
  - location: Delhi, New York, Delaware County, New York, United States
  - coordinates: 42°15′23″N 74°57′16″W
- Basin size: 7.8 mi^{2} (20 km^{2})

Peaks Brook flows into the West Branch Delaware River by Delhi, New York.
