= Bagley Brook (West Branch Delaware River tributary) =

Location
- Country: United States
- State: New York

Physical characteristics
- Source
  - location: Delaware County, New York
- Mouth: West Branch Delaware River
  - location: De Lancey, New York, Delaware County, New York, United States
  - coordinates: 42°12′38″N 74°58′22″W
- Basin size: 15.6 mi^{2} (40 km^{2})

Bagley Brook flows into the West Branch Delaware River by De Lancey, New York.
