= Pines Brook =

- Location of the mouth of Pines Brook

Location
- Country: United States
- State: New York
- County: Delaware

Physical characteristics
- Source
  - coordinates: 42°12′24″N 75°11′45″W
- Mouth: West Branch Delaware River
  - coordinates: 42°09′05″N 75°09′52″W
  - elevation: 1,158 ft (353 m)

Pines Brook is a river in Delaware County, New York. It flows into the West Branch Delaware River southwest of Walton.
