= Dry Brook (Elk Creek tributary) =

- Location of the mouth of Dry Brook

Location
- Country: United States
- State: New York
- County: Delaware

Physical characteristics
- Source
  - coordinates: 42°22′51″N 74°54′09″W
- Mouth: Elk Creek
  - coordinates: 42°20′09″N 74°52′19″W
  - elevation: 1,529 ft (466 m)

Dry Brook is a river in Delaware County, New York. It flows into Elk Creek northeast of Delhi.
