= Falls Creek (West Branch Delaware River tributary) =

- Location of the mouth within New York Falls Creek (West Branch Delaware River tributary) (the United States)

Location
- Country: United States
- State: New York
- Region: Catskills
- County: Delaware
- Towns: Meredith, Delhi

Physical characteristics
- Source
  - location: East of Meredith
- Mouth: West Branch Delaware River
  - location: North-northeast of Delhi
  - coordinates: 42°17′55″N 74°54′07″W
- Basin size: 7.77 sq mi (20.1 km^{2})

Basin features
- Tributaries
  - left: Honest Brook
- Waterfalls: Watauga Falls

Falls Creek is a river in Delaware County in the state of New York. It begins east of the hamlet of Meredith and flows in a generally southeast direction before flowing into the West Branch Delaware River north-northeast of the village of Delhi. Watauga Falls is a waterfall located on the creek.

== Tributaries ==
Honest Brook flows into Falls Creek north of Delhi.
