= Bald Mountain (Schoharie County, New York) =

Mountain in New York, United States

- Location within New York Location within the United States

Highest point
- Elevation: 2,723 feet (830 m)
- Coordinates: 42°25′25″N 74°35′38″W

Geography
- Location: Jefferson, Schoharie County, New York, U.S.
- Topo map: USGS Stamford

Bald Mountain is a mountain located in the Catskill Mountains of New York in Jefferson, Schoharie County, New York. Mount Jefferson is located north-northwest, and Mine Hill is located north of Bald Mountain.
