= East Platner Brook =

- Location of the mouth of East Platner Brook

Location
- Country: United States
- State: New York
- County: Delaware

Physical characteristics
- Source
  - coordinates: 42°19′04″N 75°00′31″W
- Mouth: Platner Brook
  - coordinates: 42°15′19″N 74°58′35″W
  - elevation: 1,421 ft (433 m)

East Platner Brook is a river in Delaware County, New York. It flows into Platner Brook northwest of Fraser.
