= Crystal Brook (East Brook tributary) =

River in Delaware County, New York

- Location of the mouth of Crystal Brook

Location
- Country: United States
- State: New York
- County: Delaware

Physical characteristics
- Source
  - coordinates: 42°16′31″N 75°04′23″W
- Mouth: East Brook
  - coordinates: 42°15′42″N 75°03′04″W
  - elevation: 1,647 ft (502 m)

Crystal Brook flows into the East Brook by Mundale, New York.
