= Christ Episcopal Church (Walton, New York) =

Historic church in New York, United States

- U.S. National Register of Historic Places
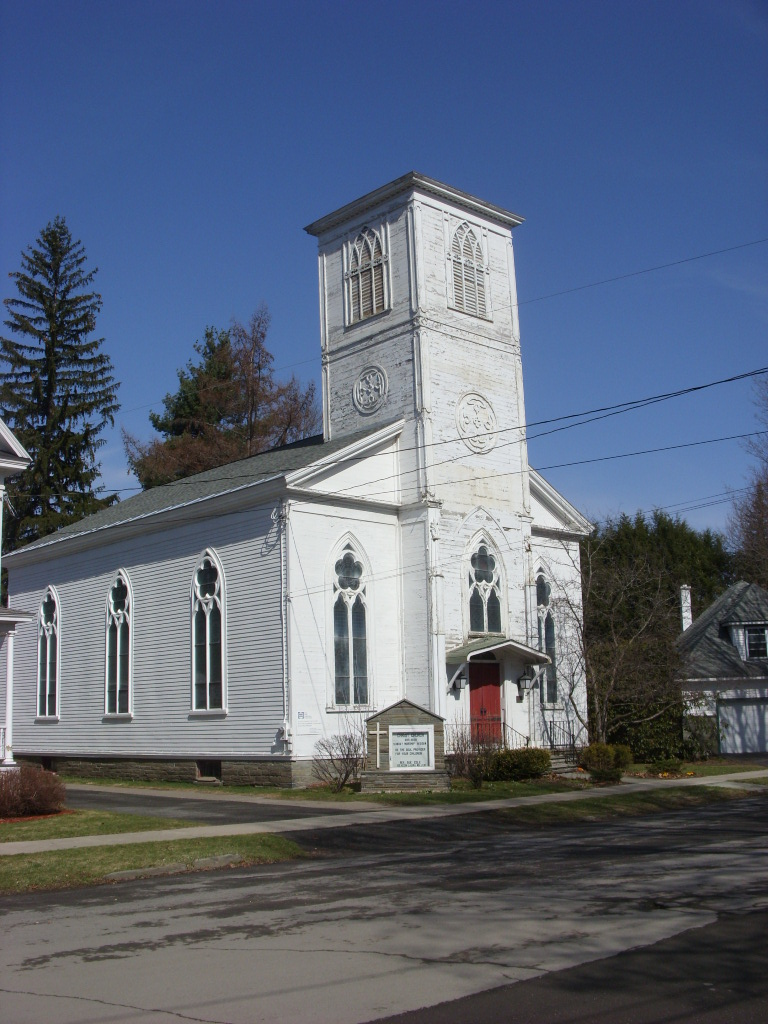
- Christ Episcopal Church, April 2009

- Location within New York Location within the United States
- Location: 41 Gardiner Pl., Walton, New York
- Coordinates: 42°10′11″N 75°7′45″W
- Area: less than one acre
- Built: 1834
- Architect: Smith, Riley
- Architectural style: Gothic Revival
- NRHP reference No.: 99000563
- Added to NRHP: May 18, 1999

Christ Episcopal Church is a historic Episcopal church building located at Walton in Delaware County, New York. It was built in 1832 in the Federal Gothic style and received an overlay of Victorian period decoration in 1883. It is a wood-frame structure and characterized by a rectangular meeting house plan, including a vestibule, nave, chancel, and sacristy. It features a steep gable roof and a central projecting entrance tower surmounted by a wooden belfry.

It was added to the National Register of Historic Places in 1999.

== See also ==
- National Register of Historic Places listings in Delaware County, New York
