= Mine Hill (Jefferson, New York) =

Mountain in New York, United States

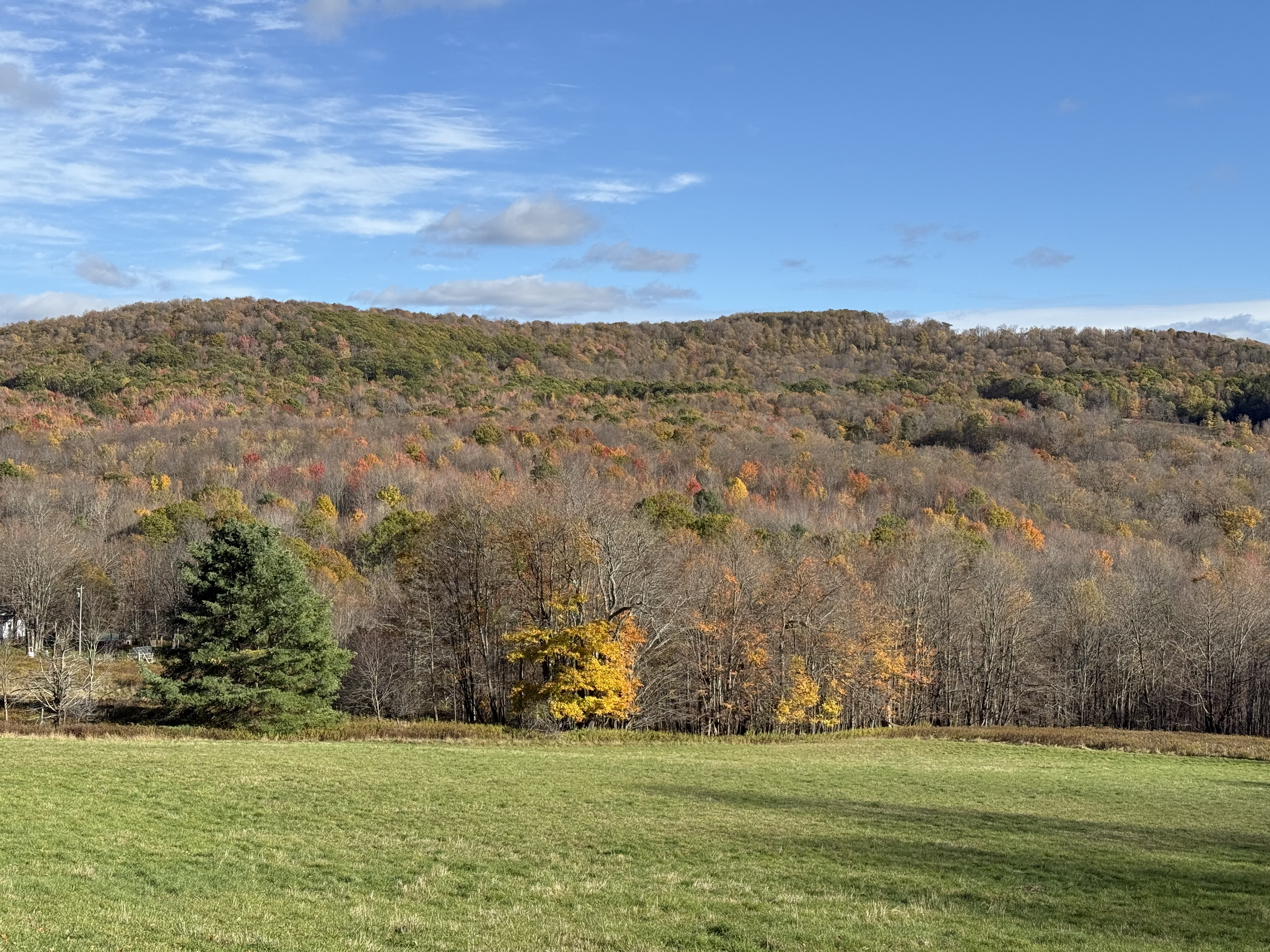
- Mine Hill viewed from the northwest, near the headwaters of the West Branch Delaware River

Highest point
- Elevation: 2,815 feet (858 m)
- Coordinates: 42°26′41″N 74°35′52″W

Geography
- Location within New York Adirondack Park Location within the United States
- Location: Jefferson, Schoharie County, New York, U.S.
- Parent range: Catskill Mountains
- Topo map: USGS Stamford

Mine Hill is a mountain in Jefferson, Schoharie County, New York. It is located northwest of South Gilboa. Bald Mountain is located south. The headwaters of the West Branch Delaware River are its northern flank, between itself and Woodchuck Hill.
