= McMurdy Brook =

- Location of the mouth of McMurdy Brook

Location
- Country: United States
- State: New York
- County: Delaware

Physical characteristics
- Source
  - coordinates: 42°23′42″N 74°43′01″W
- Mouth: West Branch Delaware River
  - coordinates: 42°21′57″N 74°41′29″W
  - elevation: 1,581 ft (482 m)

McMurdy Brook is a river in Delaware County, New York. It flows into the West Branch Delaware River west-southwest of Hobart.
