= Jefferson (CDP), New York =

Jefferson, New York
- Census-designated place
- Location within New York Location within the United States
- Coordinates: 42°28′52″N 74°36′35″W
- Country: United States
- State: New York
- County: Schoharie
- Town: Jefferson

Area
  - Total: 1.07 sq mi (2.77 km^{2})
  - Land: 1.07 sq mi (2.76 km^{2})
  - Water: 0.0039 sq mi (0.01 km^{2})
- Elevation: 1,873 ft (571 m)

Population (2020)
  - Total: 121
  - Density: 113.6/sq mi (43.85/km^{2})
- Time zone: UTC-5 (Eastern (EST))
  - Summer (DST): UTC-4 (EDT)
- ZIP Code: 12093
- Area code: 607
- FIPS code: 36-38429
- GNIS feature ID: 2806959

Jefferson is the primary hamlet and a census-designated place (CDP) within the town of Jefferson in Schoharie County, New York, United States. It was first listed as a CDP prior to the 2020 census.

Jefferson is in southwestern Schoharie County, in the center of the town of Jefferson. New York State Route 10 passes through the community, leading north 12 miles (19 km) to Richmondville and south 8 miles (13 km) to Stamford.

== Demographics ==
Historical population
Census	Pop.	Note	%±
2020	121		—
U.S. Decennial Census
