= Sherman Creek (West Branch Delaware River tributary) =

Location
- Country: United States
- State: New York, Pennsylvania

Physical characteristics
- Source
  - location: Wayne County, Pennsylvania
- Mouth: West Branch Delaware River
  - location: Hale Eddy, New York, Broome County, New York, United States
  - coordinates: 42°00′23″N 75°23′32″W
- Basin size: 19.4 mi^{2} (50 km^{2})

Sherman Creek flows into the West Branch Delaware River by Hale Eddy, New York.
