= First Congregational Church of Walton =

Historic church in New York, United States

- U.S. National Register of Historic Places
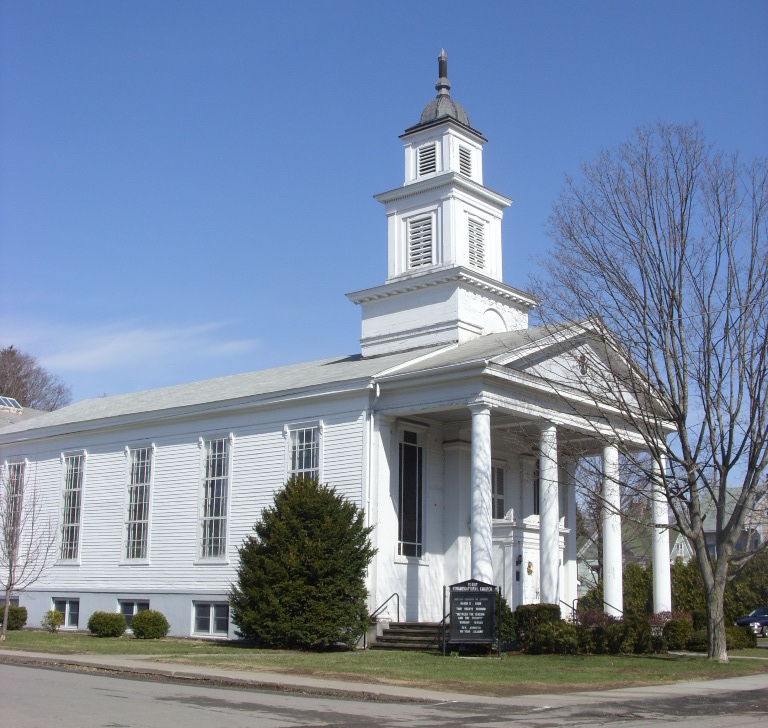
- First Congregational Church of Walton, April 2009

- Location within New York Location within the United States
- Location: 4 Mead St., Walton, New York
- Coordinates: 42°10′15″N 75°07′40″W
- Area: Less than 1 acre (0.40 ha)
- Built: 1840, 1860, 1881, 1929, 1931
- Architect: R.H Blattner and E.H. Bartoo
- Architectural style: Greek Revival, Classical Revival
- NRHP reference No.: 15000476
- Added to NRHP: July 27, 2015

First Congregational Church of Walton is a historic Congregational church located at Walton, Delaware County, New York. The earliest section of the church was built in 1840, and was extended by 16 feet in 1862. It is of wood-frame construction with clapboard siding and a gable roof with an engaged, projecting three-stage bell tower. The church was remodeled in 1931. The front facade features a pedimented projecting portico supported by four Doric order columns added in 1931. Attached to the church is the Church House, consisting of a two-story connector wing with a gabled roof and a larger-scale, two-story pavilion with a hipped roof and gabled dormer.

It was added to the National Register of Historic Places in 2015.
