= Stewart House and Howard–Stewart Family Cemetery =

Historic house in Schoharie County, New York

- U.S. National Register of Historic Places
- Location within New York Location within the United States
- Location: 583 NY 10, near South Jefferson, Jefferson, New York
- Coordinates: 42°26′42″N 74°34′56″W
- Area: 4.2 acres (1.7 ha)
- Built: 1828, c. 1857
- Architectural style: Greek Revival
- NRHP reference No.: 12000261
- Added to NRHP: May 8, 2012

Stewart House and Howard–Stewart Family Cemetery is a historic home and family cemetery located in Jefferson, Schoharie County, New York. It was built about 1857, and is a two-story, "T"-plan Greek Revival style timber frame farmhouse with a 1 1/2-story side wing. It is sheathed in clapboard, has a front gable roof, and Doric order corner pilasters. Also on the property is a contributing family cemetery with burials dated from 1828 to 1881.

It was listed on the National Register of Historic Places in 2012.
