= Basset Brook (New York) =

Location
- Country: United States
- State: New York

Physical characteristics
- Source
  - location: Delaware County, New York
- Mouth: West Branch Delaware River
  - location: Stamford, New York, Delaware County, New York, United States
  - coordinates: 42°23′18″N 74°38′47″W
- Basin size: 2.46 mi^{2} (6.4 km^{2})

Basset Brook flows into the West Branch Delaware River by Stamford, New York.
