= Chase Brook (West Branch Delaware River tributary) =

Location
- Country: United States
- State: New York

Physical characteristics
- Source
  - location: Delaware County, New York
- Mouth: West Branch Delaware River
  - location: Rock Rift, New York, Delaware County, New York, United States
  - coordinates: 42°05′37″N 75°11′47″W
- Basin size: 4.75 mi^{2} (12.3 km^{2})

Basin features
- Tributaries
  - left: Spencer Brook

Chase Brook is a river in Delaware County, New York. It flows into the West Branch Delaware River by Rock Rift.
