= Elk Creek (West Branch Delaware River tributary) =

Location
- Country: United States
- State: New York

Physical characteristics
- Source
  - location: Delaware County, New York
- Mouth: West Branch Delaware River
  - location: East Delhi, New York, Delaware County, New York, United States
  - coordinates: 42°17′54″N 74°53′41″W
- Basin size: 15.4 mi^{2} (40 km^{2})

Basin features
- Tributaries
  - right: Dry Brook

Elk Creek flows into the West Branch Delaware River by East Delhi, New York.
