= Whitaker Brook =

Location
- Country: United States
- State: New York

Physical characteristics
- Source: Unnamed Pond
  - location: Delaware County, New York
- Mouth: West Branch Delaware River
  - location: Hale Eddy, New York, Delaware County, New York, United States
  - coordinates: 42°02′02″N 75°24′46″W

Whitaker Brook flows into the West Branch Delaware River by Hale Eddy, New York.
