= Walton Grange No. 1454 =

- Walton Grange #1454-Former Armory
- U.S. National Register of Historic Places
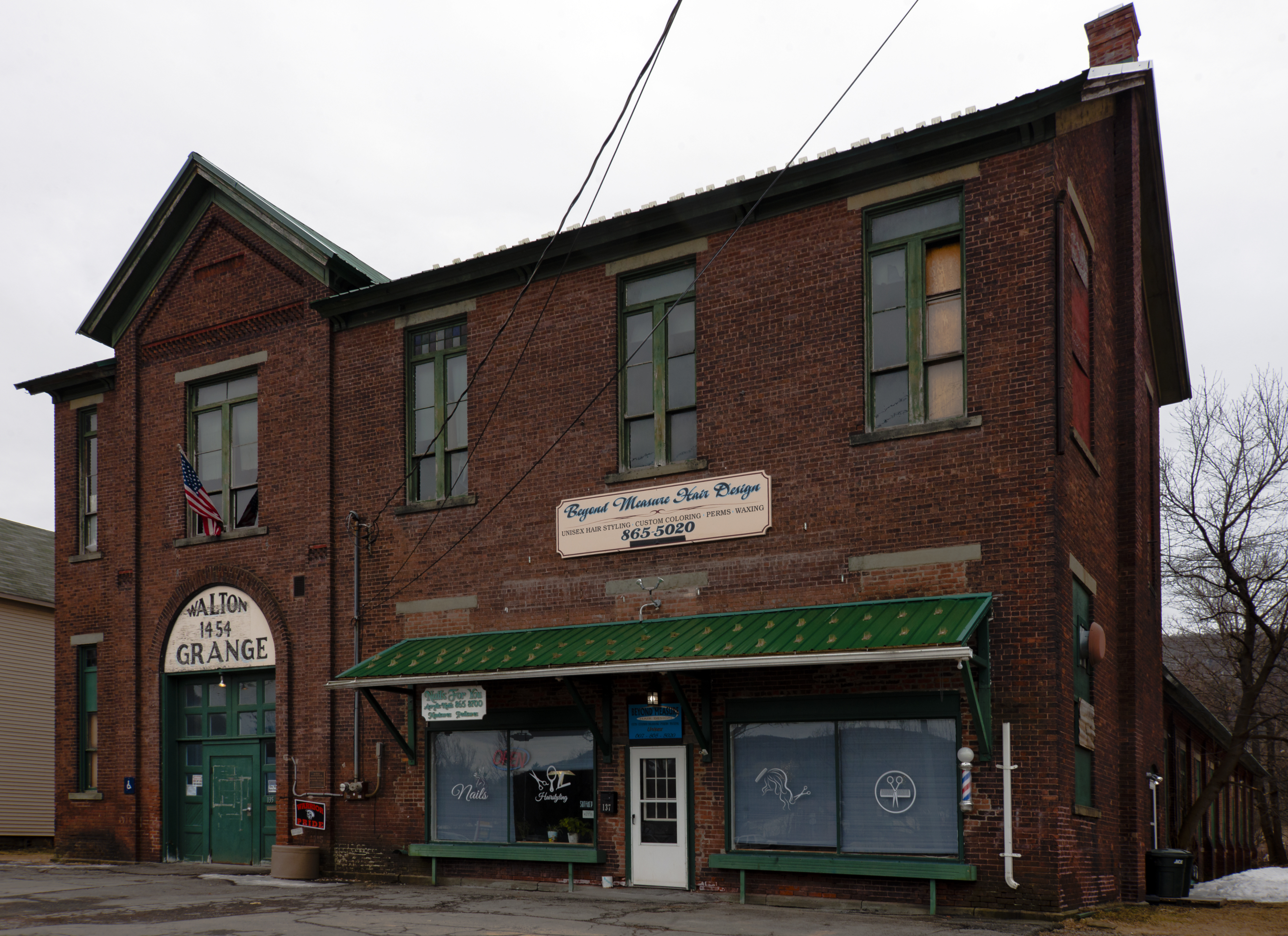
- North elevation and west profile, 2019

- Location within New York Location within the United States
- Location: 137 Stockton Avenue, Walton, New York
- Coordinates: 42°9′56″N 75°7′50″W
- Area: less than one acre
- Built: 1886
- NRHP reference No.: 98000666
- Added to NRHP: June 22, 1998

Walton Grange No. 1454 is a historic Grange building located at 137 Stockton Avenue in Walton in Delaware County, New York, United States. Designed by architects Randall and Gilbert of Walton and built in 1886, it consists of a two-story administration building with an attached gable roofed drill shed. It was occupied from 1886-1896 by the 33rd Separate Company then vacated in 1896 and converted for use as a school and a Grange hall. It was listed on the National Register of Historic Places in 1998 as Walton Grange #1454-Former Armory.

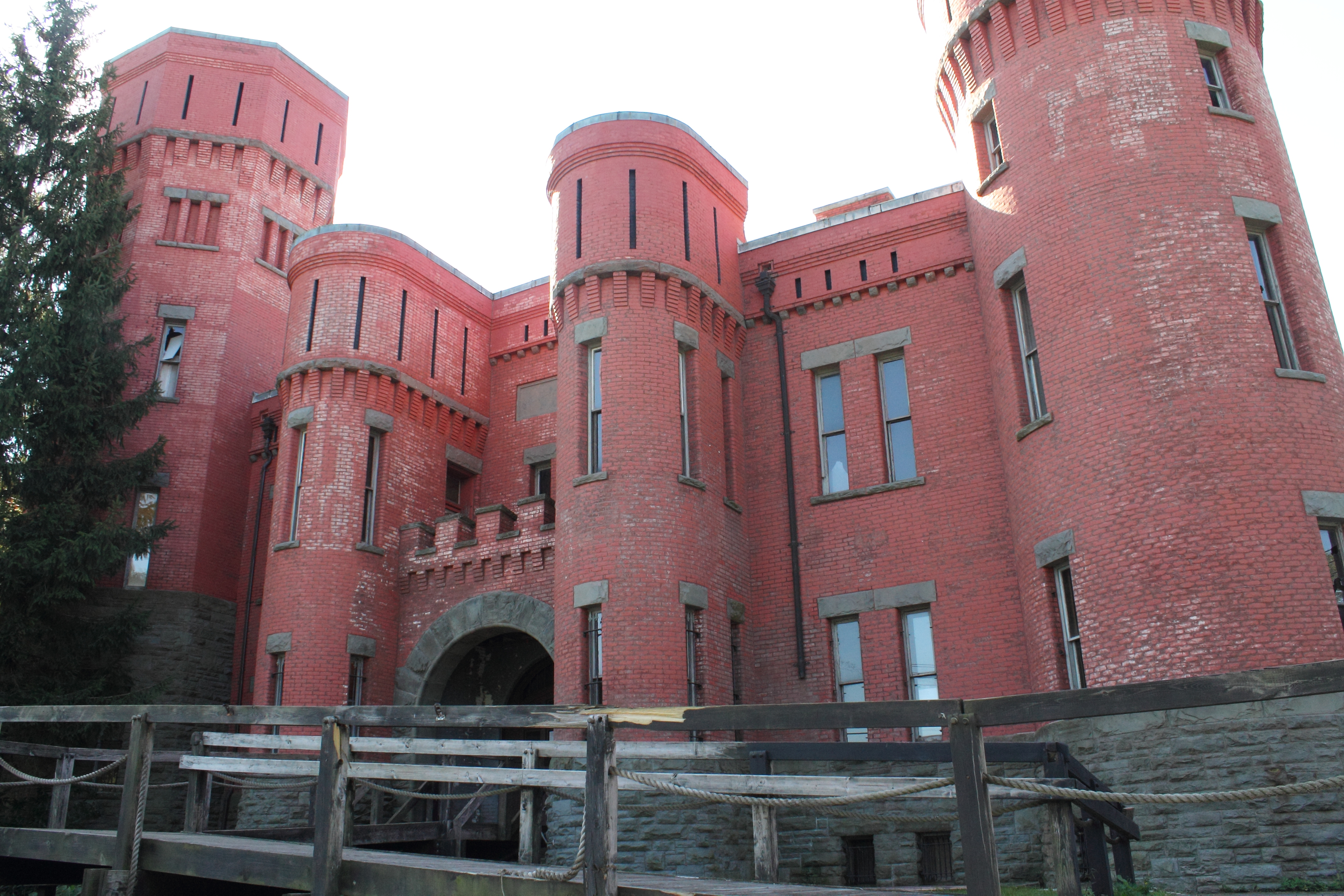
Walton National Guard Armory, being restored (as of 2014) as Castle on the Hill with event space and a cafe

The Stockton Avenue Armory, a National Guard armory built in 1896, is located next to the Grange building. It was designed by Isaac Perry. It was occupied from 1896 to 1965 and converted to White Castle Department Store in 1966. It is now known as the Castle on the Delaware and is being restored to host events. It is also home to a cafe. In 2016 it was separately listed on the National Register as the Second Walton Armory (33rd Separate Company).

The South Street Armory, located at 55 South Street, was constructed in 1965.

== See also ==
- National Register of Historic Places listings in Delaware County, New York
