= First Presbyterian Church of Jefferson =

Historic church in New York, United States

- U.S. National Register of Historic Places
- Location within New York Location within the United States
- Location: Creamery St. at Park Ave., Jefferson, New York
- Coordinates: 42°28′50″N 74°36′48″W
- Area: Less than 1 acre (0.40 ha)
- Built: 1837
- Architect: Lines Porter
- Architectural style: Greek Revival
- NRHP reference No.: 12000481
- Added to NRHP: August 7, 2012

First Presbyterian Church of Jefferson, also known as Maple Museum, is a historic Presbyterian church located in Jefferson, Schoharie County, New York. It was built in 1837, and is a two-story, heavy timber frame, Greek Revival style meeting house style church. It has a front gable roof, flush board siding, and Doric order pediment and entablature. The front facade features a square staged bell tower. The church closed in 1919, and has since been used as a school, American Legion hall, and most recently as a community center and local history museum.

It was listed on the National Register of Historic Places in 2012.
