= Platner Brook =

Location
- Country: United States
- State: New York

Physical characteristics
- Source: West Platner Brook
  - location: Town of Franklin, Delaware County, New York
- 2nd source: East Platner Brook
  - location: Town of Franklin, Delaware County, New York
- Mouth: West Branch Delaware River
  - location: Fraser, New York, Delaware County, New York, United States
  - coordinates: 42°14′32″N 74°57′38″W
- Basin size: 14 mi^{2} (36 km^{2})

Platner Brook is formed by two branches, the East Platner Brook and West Platner Brook. Platner Brook flows into the West Branch Delaware River by Fraser, New York.
