= Bloomville Methodist Episcopal Church =

Historic church in New York, United States

- U.S. National Register of Historic Places
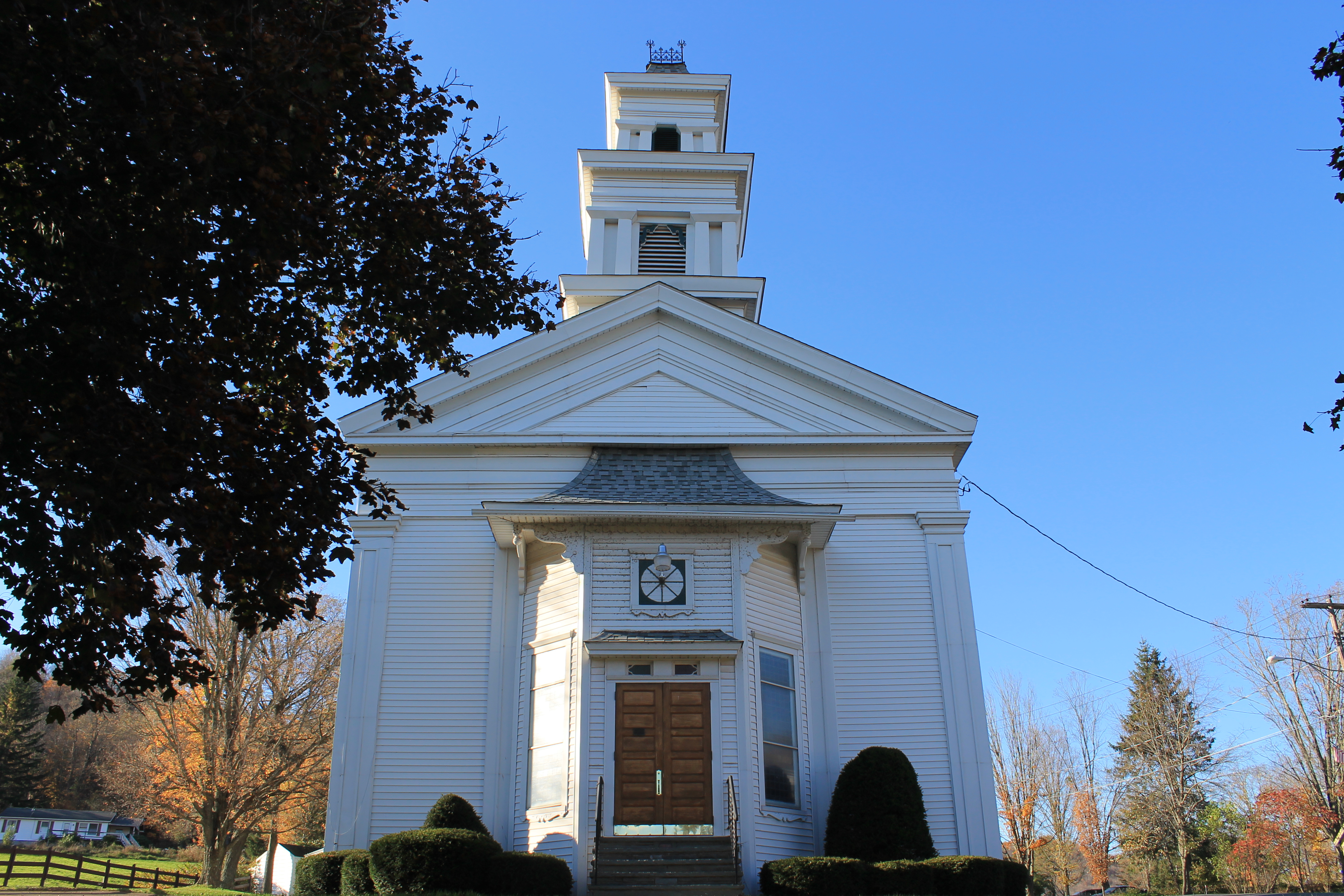
- Bloomville Methodist Episcopal Church

- Location within New York Location within the United States
- Location: 35 Church St., Bloomville, New York
- Coordinates: 42°19′59″N 74°48′36″W
- Area: 1 acre (0.40 ha)
- Built: 1810
- Architect: Hughes, James; Hulselander, L.L.
- Architectural style: Late Victorian
- NRHP reference No.: 06001080
- Added to NRHP: November 29, 2006

Bloomville Methodist Episcopal Church is a historic Methodist Episcopal church and parsonage of New York state.

It is located at 35 Church Street in Bloomville, a hamlet of Kortright in Delaware County. The church is a large rectangular wood-frame buildings constructed in stages between about 1810 and 1889. It is surmounted by a steep gable roof and a three-stage tower. The parsonage is a 2 1/2-story wood-frame building with a hipped roof built in 1904.

It was added to the National Register of Historic Places in 2006.
