= Munds Park, Arizona =

CDP in Coconino County, Arizona

- CDP
- Location in Coconino County and the state of Arizona

- Location in the United States
- Coordinates: 34°56′11″N 111°37′50″W
- Country: United States
- State: Arizona
- County: Coconino

Area
  - Total: 22.29 sq mi (57.72 km^{2})
  - Land: 22.25 sq mi (57.62 km^{2})
  - Water: 0.039 sq mi (0.10 km^{2})
- Elevation: 6,510 ft (1,980 m)

Population (2020)
  - Total: 1,096
  - Density: 49.3/sq mi (19.02/km^{2})
- Time zone: UTC-7 (MST)
- ZIP code: 86017
- Area code: 928
- FIPS code: 04-48170
- GNIS feature ID: 2408889

Munds Park is an unincorporated census-designated place (CDP) in Coconino County, Arizona, United States. Munds Park sits at an elevation of 6,510 feet (1,980 m), and is surrounded by the Coconino National Forest. Munds Park was founded circa 1876, by rancher William Munds who settled in the area with his family. It is located just off Interstate 17, mile marker 323, and as of the 2020 census, it had a population of 1,096. The Munds Park post office has the ZIP code 86017.

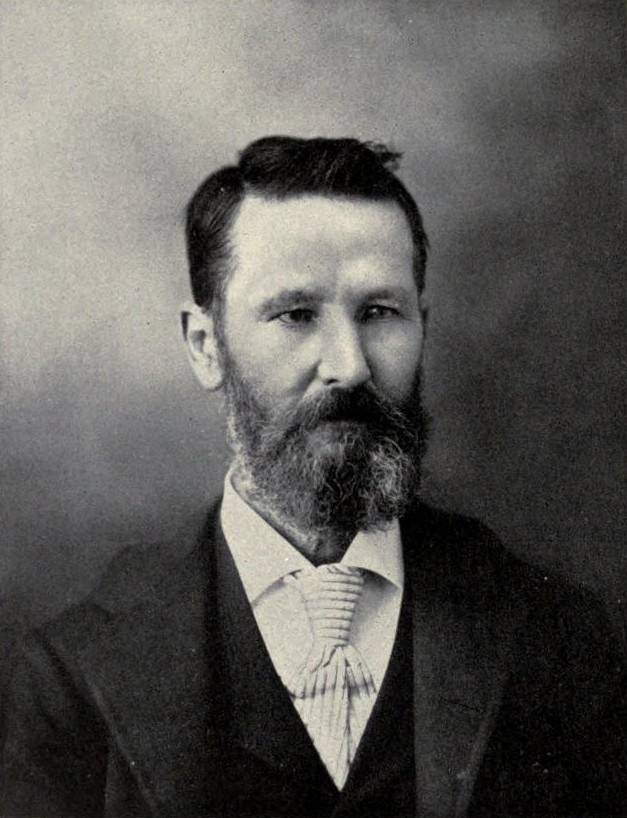
William M. Munds, settler and namesake of Munds Park

== Demographics ==
Historical population
Census	Pop.	Note	%±
2010	631		—
2020	1,096		73.7%
U.S. Decennial Census

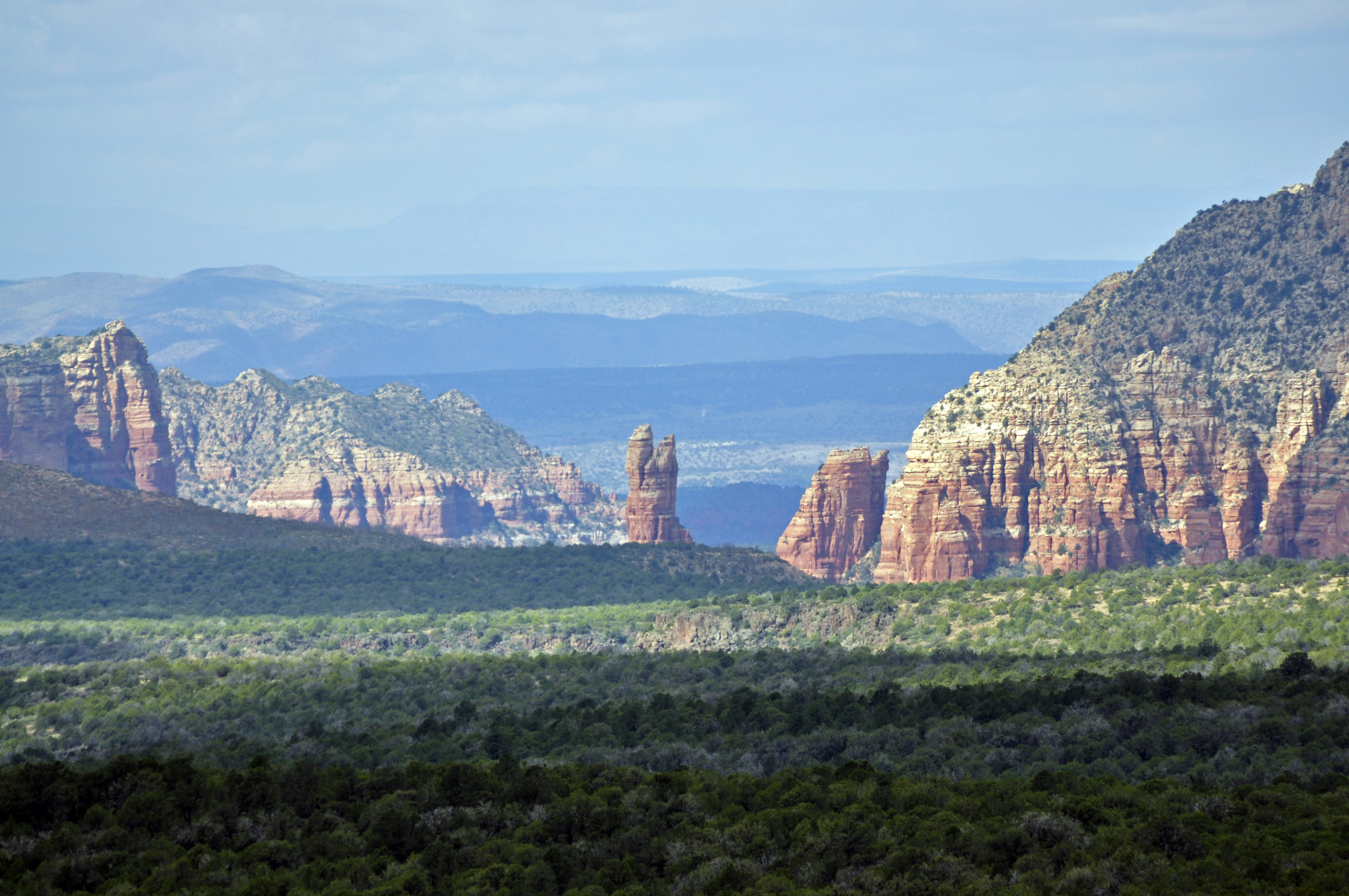
View of the Red Rocks of Sedona from I-17, just south of Munds Park

=== 2020 census ===
As of the 2020 census, Munds Park had a population of 1,096. The median age was 56.1 years. 11.2% of residents were under the age of 18 and 32.6% of residents were 65 years of age or older. For every 100 females there were 98.9 males, and for every 100 females age 18 and over there were 101.0 males age 18 and over.

70.5% of residents lived in urban areas, while 29.5% lived in rural areas.

There were 574 households in Munds Park, of which 9.1% had children under the age of 18 living in them. Of all households, 44.1% were married-couple households, 26.0% were households with a male householder and no spouse or partner present, and 23.9% were households with a female householder and no spouse or partner present. About 41.1% of all households were made up of individuals and 17.2% had someone living alone who was 65 years of age or older.

There were 3,424 housing units, of which 83.2% were vacant. The homeowner vacancy rate was 4.4% and the rental vacancy rate was 25.6%.

Racial composition as of the 2020 census
Race	Number	Percent
White	995	90.8%
Black or African American	2	0.2%
American Indian and Alaska Native	12	1.1%
Asian	7	0.6%
Native Hawaiian and Other Pacific Islander	0	0.0%
Some other race	28	2.6%
Two or more races	52	4.7%
Hispanic or Latino (of any race)	81	7.4%

=== 2000 census ===
As of the census of 2000, there were 1,250 people, 583 households, and 378 families residing in the CDP. The population density was 56.0 inhabitants per square mile (21.6/km^{2}). There were 2,994 housing units at an average density of 134.2 per square mile (51.8/km^{2}). The racial makeup of the CDP was 95.9% White, 0.3% Black or African American, 0.8% Native American, 0.2% Asian, 1.2% from other races, and 1.5% from two or more races. Hispanic or Latino of any race were 5.7% of the population.

There were 583 households, out of which 16.3% had children under the age of 18 living with them, 60.2% were married couples living together, 2.9% had a female householder with no husband present, and 35.0% were non-families. 26.2% of all households were made up of individuals, and 9.9% had someone living alone who was 65 years of age or older. The average household size was 2.14 and the average family size was 2.58.

In the CDP, the age distribution of the population shows 15.5% under the age of 18, 4.3% from 18 to 24, 21.3% from 25 to 44, 36.1% from 45 to 64, and 22.8% who were 65 years of age or older. The median age was 50 years. For every 100 females, there were 100.6 males. For every 100 females age 18 and over, there were 102.3 males.

The median income for a household in the CDP was $41,432, and the median income for a family was $49,803. Males had a median income of $40,558 versus $22,200 for females. The per capita income for the CDP was $22,769. About 4.4% of families and 7.9% of the population were below the poverty line, including 10.4% of those under age 18 and none of those age 65 or over.

== Geography ==
Munds Park sits at 6,510 feet in elevation and is located on the Colorado Plateau in north central Arizona. It is surrounded by the Coconino National Forest and sits just above Sedona and Oak Creek Canyon. Munds Park is a popular summer vacation destination in Arizona as it is consistently 20-30 °F cooler than the deserts. Munds Park is about 15 minutes or 21 miles (33 km) south of Flagstaff, accessed via Interstate 17. From Phoenix it is 126 miles (202 km) or approximately a 2 hour drive north also using Interstate 17. According to the United States Census Bureau, the CDP has a total area of 22.3 square miles (58 km^{2}), of which 22.3 square miles (58 km^{2}) is land and 0.04 square miles (0.10 km^{2}) (0.1%) is water.

== Climate ==
Munds Park has a Humid continental climate (Köppen Dsb) with warm summers and cool nights as well as cold, snowy winters. Due to its elevation at almost 7,000 feet (2,134 m) summer temperatures range from the mid 70s to high 80s but the area will occasionally reach temperatures around 90 °F (32 °C) or higher. Much of Arizona has two distinct wet periods, the summer monsoon and winter storms. During the summer months, these monsoon storms develop almost daily in the late afternoon and early evening hours, bringing heavy rain, strong wind, thunder, lightning, and even hail that can be damaging. These thunderstorms provide much needed precipitation and help lower temperatures of the surrounding areas. In July, the average high temperature is 83.0 °F (28.3 °C) with an average low temperature of 49.3 °F (9.6 °C). In January, the average high temperature is 45.7 °F (7.6 °C) with an average low temperature of 16.7 °F (−8.5 °C).

Depending on the year, winters can be very harsh or cool and mild. This is due to El Nino and La Nina events off the Pacific Coast which affects winter precipitation in the Western US. During an El Nino year winters can be harsh with nighttime lows reaching the single digits and daytime temps in the 40s. Major Snowstorms are common during wet years and annual snow totals can easily surpass 100 inches. Accumulating snow can reach up to 6 feet at times and roadways can become frozen and very hard to navigate. The National Weather Service will issue winter storm warnings and ADOT will post closures/detours and plow roads if conditions are severe. During La Nina years, conditions are the opposite. Winter precipitation is below average and temperatures are very mild with daytime temps in the mid 50's and nighttime lows getting just below freezing. Snow does still occur in La Nina years however much of the winter precipitation that falls is snow-rain mix or sleet. Overall, the average snowfall total for Munds Park is 92.8 inches (236 cm) annually.

During very strong geomagnetic storms the Northern Lights can be visible from Munds Park and other areas around Northern Arizona and the Mogollon Rim including Flagstaff, Sedona, Cottonwood, Prescott, Payson, and Show Low. Extremely strong Solar flares allow the Aurora Borealis to be seen this far south. The lights appear a deep red and pink hue.

Climate data for Munds Park, Arizona (1991–2020 normals, extremes 1986–2017)
Month	Jan	Feb	Mar	Apr	May	Jun	Jul	Aug	Sep	Oct	Nov	Dec	Year
Record high °F (°C)	65 (18)	68 (20)	75 (24)	80 (27)	88 (31)	95 (35)	97 (36)	92 (33)	88 (31)	85 (29)	75 (24)	69 (21)	97 (36)
Mean maximum °F (°C)	56.8 (13.8)	59.1 (15.1)	65.1 (18.4)	72.5 (22.5)	80.5 (26.9)	88.0 (31.1)	91.8 (33.2)	87.8 (31.0)	83.4 (28.6)	77.2 (25.1)	67.5 (19.7)	59.9 (15.5)	92.5 (33.6)
Mean daily maximum °F (°C)	45.7 (7.6)	47.1 (8.4)	52.8 (11.6)	59.8 (15.4)	68.5 (20.3)	79.5 (26.4)	83.0 (28.3)	80.8 (27.1)	75.8 (24.3)	65.6 (18.7)	54.2 (12.3)	45.6 (7.6)	63.2 (17.3)
Daily mean °F (°C)	31.2 (−0.4)	33.0 (0.6)	37.9 (3.3)	43.4 (6.3)	51.0 (10.6)	59.5 (15.3)	66.1 (18.9)	65.2 (18.4)	58.6 (14.8)	48.3 (9.1)	38.4 (3.6)	30.7 (−0.7)	46.9 (8.3)
Mean daily minimum °F (°C)	16.7 (−8.5)	19.0 (−7.2)	23.1 (−4.9)	27.1 (−2.7)	33.5 (0.8)	39.5 (4.2)	49.3 (9.6)	49.6 (9.8)	41.4 (5.2)	31.0 (−0.6)	22.5 (−5.3)	15.8 (−9.0)	30.7 (−0.7)
Mean minimum °F (°C)	−3.1 (−19.5)	2.8 (−16.2)	6.0 (−14.4)	16.3 (−8.7)	23.1 (−4.9)	28.4 (−2.0)	38.0 (3.3)	41.1 (5.1)	31.0 (−0.6)	19.1 (−7.2)	10.8 (−11.8)	−0.9 (−18.3)	−7.6 (−22.0)
Record low °F (°C)	−21 (−29)	−20 (−29)	−9 (−23)	1 (−17)	18 (−8)	20 (−7)	29 (−2)	31 (−1)	26 (−3)	6 (−14)	−8 (−22)	−27 (−33)	−27 (−33)
Average precipitation inches (mm)	3.12 (79)	3.03 (77)	2.53 (64)	1.08 (27)	0.76 (19)	0.25 (6.4)	3.15 (80)	5.01 (127)	2.96 (75)	1.92 (49)	1.69 (43)	2.83 (72)	28.33 (720)
Average snowfall inches (cm)	17.9 (45)	28.2 (72)	23.8 (60)	6.4 (16)	0.3 (0.76)	0.0 (0.0)	0.0 (0.0)	0.0 (0.0)	0.0 (0.0)	0.9 (2.3)	3.9 (9.9)	11.2 (28)	92.8 (236)
Average precipitation days (≥ 0.01 inch)	7.0	7.5	7.1	3.9	3.3	2.4	11.2	16.8	9.8	5.2	4.6	6.6	85.4
Average snowy days (≥ 0.1 inch)	7.5	10.9	9.5	2.1	0.3	0.0	0.0	0.0	0.0	0.6	2.1	5.1	38.1
Source: National Oceanic and Atmospheric Administration

== Community ==
Munds Park is widely regarded for its variety of outdoor recreation opportunities in all seasons. The Munds Park Trail System is a collection of trails surrounding the town designated for hiking, mountain biking, and ATVs. It is an extremely popular summer destination for off-road and All-Terrain Vehicles. The Arizona Trail passes between Munds Park and Mormon Lake. At large camping is allowed in the adjacent Coconino National Forest for portions of the year.

Several lakes can be found in the area. Located directly in Munds Park is Lake O'Dell, a small lake created by an earthen dam on Munds Creek. Lake O’Dell is popular among kayakers and local fishermen. It is a haven for both migratory and non-migratory bird species, including ospreys and bald eagles. Other nearby lakes used for outdoor recreation include Lake Mary and Mormon Lake, Arizona's largest natural lake, along with dozens of springs and natural ponds known as tanks.

Munds Park is located within Arizona Hunting Unit 6A, and is among the richest units for elk, deer, and other large game in the United States. 6A is heavily forested and is crossed by dozens of dirt roads. Also located in Munds Park is Pinewood Country Club, a private 18-hole championship golf course.

The official paper of Munds Park since 1993 is the Pinewood News. The paper notes events, history and local news.

== Pinewood Country Club ==
Munds Park is home of the Pinewood Country Club, an 18-hole championship golf course. It is normally open from about Memorial Day through October. The clubhouse was constructed in the late 1950s and is home to two dining/event rooms, a restaurant, and a bar, plus it has a patio for outdoor seating. The club features a large driving range, chipping green, and putting green. The country club has a lightning warning system.

== Education ==
Munds Park is within the Flagstaff Unified School District. The zoned secondary schools are Mount Elden Middle School and Flagstaff High School.
