= Spencer Brook (New York) =

- Location of the mouth of Spencer Brook

Location
- Country: United States
- State: New York
- County: Delaware

Physical characteristics
- Source
  - coordinates: 42°04′36″N 75°09′36″W
- Mouth: Chase Brook
  - coordinates: 42°05′36″N 75°10′31″W
  - elevation: 1,348 ft (411 m)

Spencer Brook is a river in Delaware County, New York. It flows into Chase Brook east of Rock Rift.
