= Odell Lake (Arizona) =

Reservoir in Coconino County, Arizona, US

- Location within Arizona
- Location: Coconino County, Arizona
- Coordinates: 34°56′05″N 111°37′53″W
- Type: reservoir
- References: GNIS data – Odell Lake

Odell Lake is a small, shallow reservoir in the Northern Arizona community of Munds Park. The lake is formed by a small earthen dam along Munds Creek and provides habitat for a number of migratory and non-migratory birds, including bald eagles. A majority of the lake shore is private property. Maintenance of the lake, along with the dam, is carried out by Pinewood Country Club. By the lake's southeastern shore is under the jurisdiction of the Coconino National Forest.

== Recreation ==
Odell Lake is a popular local fishing spot for crappie, northern pike and bullhead catfish. The lake can also be used for tubing, kayaking and canoeing. There are numerous hiking trails leading to and from the lake's southeastern shore.
