= Betty Brook (West Branch Delaware River tributary) =

Location
- Country: United States
- State: New York

Physical characteristics
- Source
  - location: Delaware County, New York
- Mouth: West Branch Delaware River
  - location: Hobart, New York, Delaware County, New York, United States
  - coordinates: 42°20′36″N 74°44′03″W
- Basin size: 9.04 mi^{2} (23.4 km^{2})

Betty Brook flows into the West Branch Delaware River by Hobart, New York.
