= Beers Brook (West Branch Delaware River tributary) =

Location
- Country: United States
- State: New York
- County: Delaware

Physical characteristics
- Source
  - location: E of Beerston
  - coordinates: 42°07′45″N 75°05′15″W
- Mouth: West Branch Delaware River
  - location: Beerston
  - coordinates: 42°07′41″N 75°09′34″W
  - elevation: 1,161 ft (354 m)
- Basin size: 6.83 mi^{2} (17.7 km^{2})

Beers Brook is a river in Delaware County, New York. It flows into the West Branch Delaware River by Beerston. Beers Brook flows through Russ Gray Pond.
