= Lake Brook (West Branch Delaware River tributary) =

Location
- Country: United States
- State: New York
- County: Delaware

Physical characteristics
- Source: Odell Lake
  - location: NNW of Hobart
  - coordinates: 42°25′17″N 74°41′36″W
  - elevation: 2,051 ft (625 m)
- Mouth: West Branch Delaware River
  - location: W of Hobart
  - coordinates: 42°22′18″N 74°41′14″W
  - elevation: 1,585 ft (483 m)
- Basin size: 6.90 mi^{2} (17.9 km^{2})

Lake Brook is a river in Delaware County, New York. It drains Odell Lake and flows south before converging with the West Branch Delaware River west of Hobart.
