= Jefferson, New York =

Town in Schoharie County, New York, US

- Town
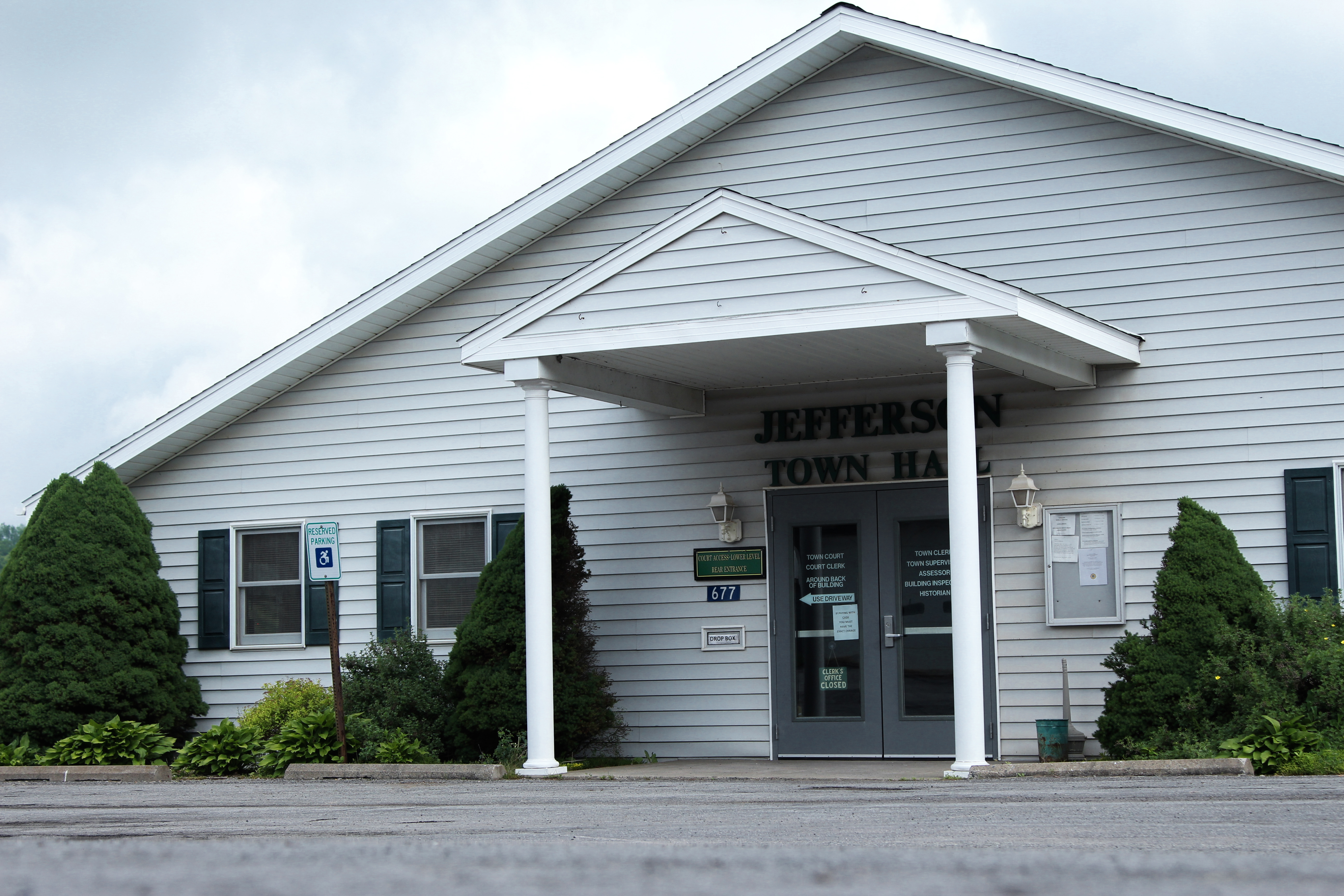
- Town hall

- Location in Schoharie County and the state of New York.
- Coordinates: 42°29′55″N 74°36′6″W
- Country: United States
- State: New York
- County: Schoharie

Area
  - Total: 43.41 sq mi (112.44 km^{2})
  - Land: 43.25 sq mi (112.02 km^{2})
  - Water: 0.16 sq mi (0.42 km^{2})
- Elevation: 1,991 ft (607 m)

Population (2020)
  - Total: 1,333
- Time zone: UTC-5 (Eastern (EST))
  - Summer (DST): UTC-4 (EDT)
- ZIP code: 12093
- Area code: 607
- FIPS code: 36-38440
- GNIS feature ID: 0979106
- Website: Town website

Jefferson is a town in Schoharie County, New York, United States. The population was 1,333 at the 2020 census. The town is on the southwestern border of the county and is east of Oneonta.

== History ==
The town was unoccupied by settlers during the American Revolution, first being settled around 1793 by New Englanders.

In 1803, the town was created from part of the Town of Blenheim.

The First Presbyterian Church of Jefferson and Parker 13-Sided Barn are listed on the National Register of Historic Places.

== Geography ==
According to the United States Census Bureau, the town has a total area of 43.4 square miles (112 km^{2}), of which 43.3 square miles (112 km^{2}) is land and 0.1 square miles (0.26 km^{2}) (0.28%) is water.

The western town line is the border of Delaware County.

The West Branch of the Delaware River originates in Jefferson. Along with the Delaware River Watershed, streams in the eastern part of the town feed into the Mohawk River Watershed while those in the western part feed into the Susquehanna River Watershed.

== Demographics ==
Historical population
Census	Pop.	Note	%±
1820	1,573		—
1830	1,743		10.8%
1840	2,033		16.6%
1850	1,748		−14.0%
1860	1,716		−1.8%
1870	1,712		−0.2%
1880	1,636		−4.4%
1890	1,469		−10.2%
1900	1,409		−4.1%
1910	1,280		−9.2%
1920	1,065		−16.8%
1930	916		−14.0%
1940	845		−7.8%
1950	819		−3.1%
1960	800		−2.3%
1970	840		5.0%
1980	1,108		31.9%
1990	1,190		7.4%
2000	1,285		8.0%
2010	1,410		9.7%
2020	1,333		−5.5%
U.S. Decennial Census

As of the census of 2000, there were 1,285 people, 520 households, and 364 families residing in the town. The population density was 11.5/km^{2} (29.7/sq mi). There were 904 housing units at an average density of 20.9 per square mile (8.1/km^{2}). The racial makeup of the town was 96.42% White, 1.71% African American, 0.16% Native American, 0.08% Asian, 0.08% from other races, and 1.56% from two or more races. Hispanic or Latino of any race were 1.17% of the population.

There were 520 households, out of which 27.9% had children under the age of 18 living with them, 58.3% were married couples living together, 7.5% had a female householder with no husband present, and 30.0% were non-families. 25.0% of all households were made up of individuals, and 9.0% had someone living alone who was 65 years of age or older. The average household size was 2.47 and the average family size was 2.91.

In the town, the population was spread out, with 23.3% under the age of 18, 4.7% from 18 to 24, 25.4% from 25 to 44, 30.7% from 45 to 64, and 15.9% who were 65 years of age or older. The median age was 43 years. For every 100 females, there were 100.8 males. For every 100 females age 18 and over, there were 100.6 males.

The median income for a household in the town was $35,000, and the median income for a family was $43,269. Males had a median income of $34,875 versus $25,417 for females. The per capita income for the town was $19,569. About 9.1% of families and 9.9% of the population were below the poverty line, including 10.8% of those under age 18 and 9.2% of those age 65 or over.

== Communities and locations in Jefferson ==
- Arabia – A hamlet by the northern town line on County Road 64.
- Baird Corners – A location north of Jefferson village on NY-10.
- East Jefferson – A hamlet northeast of Jefferson village, located on County Road 16.
- Jefferson – The hamlet of Jefferson is on Route 10.
- Mount Jefferson – A small mountain (2733 feet, 833 metres) north of the source of the Delaware River.
- South Jefferson – A hamlet southeast of Jefferson village on NY-10. The Stewart House and Howard–Stewart Family Cemetery was listed on the National Register of Historic Places in 2012.
- West Jefferson – A hamlet west of Jefferson village, near the western town line and the junction of County Roads 2A and 15.
