= Scott Township, Wayne County, Pennsylvania =

Township in Pennsylvania, US

Scott Township
- Township
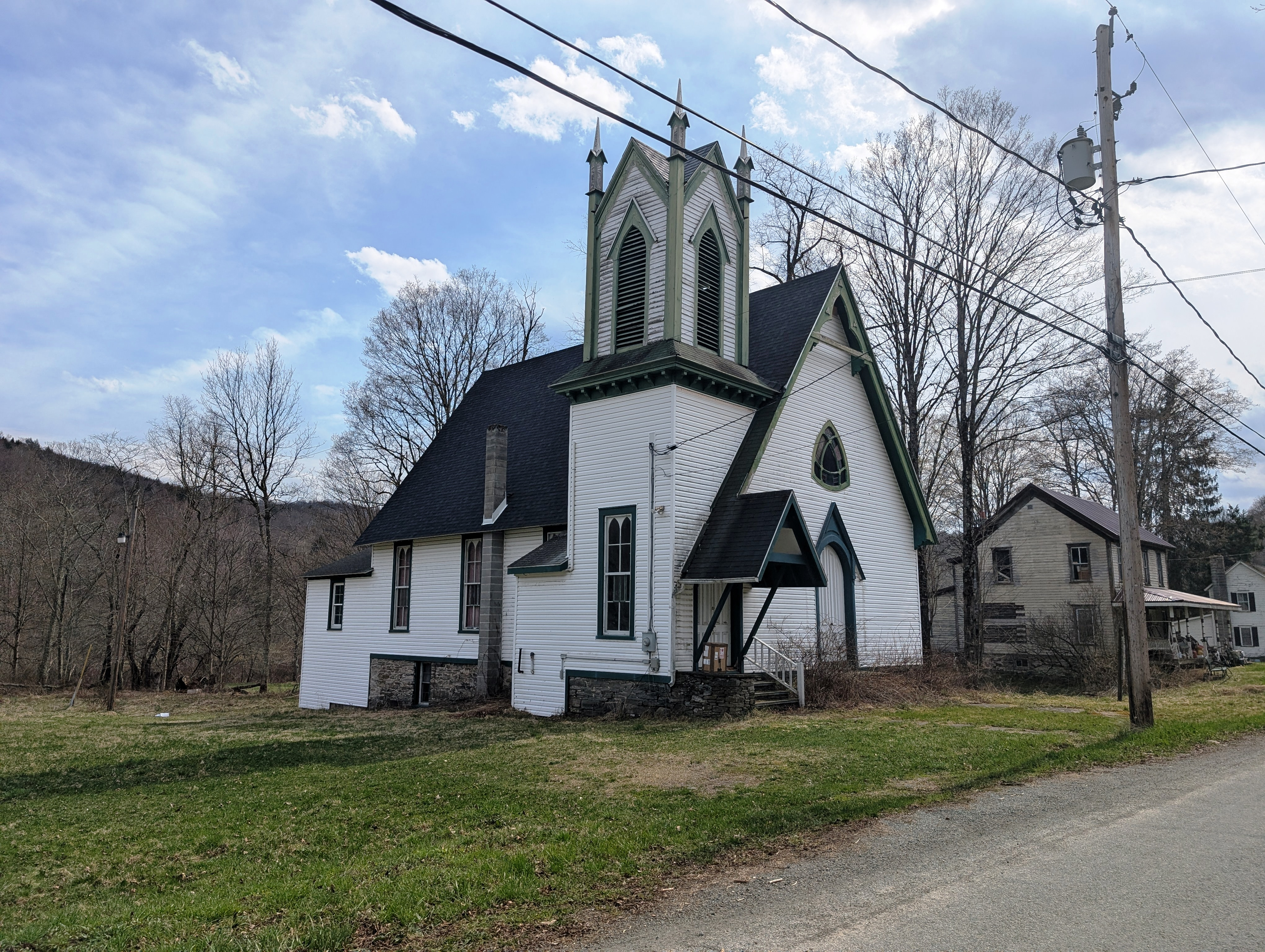
- Former Sherman Bible Chapel in the village of Sherman

- Location in Wayne County and the state of Pennsylvania.

- Location of Pennsylvania in the United States
- Coordinates: 41°57′00″N 75°21′59″W
- Country: United States
- State: Pennsylvania
- County: Wayne

Area
  - Total: 44.32 sq mi (114.79 km^{2})
  - Land: 43.52 sq mi (112.72 km^{2})
  - Water: 0.80 sq mi (2.07 km^{2})
- Elevation: 1,152 ft (351 m)

Population (2010)
  - Total: 593
  - Estimate (2016): 567
  - Density: 13.0/sq mi (5.03/km^{2})
- Time zone: UTC-5 (EST)
  - Summer (DST): UTC-4 (EDT)
- Area code: 570
- FIPS code: 42-127-68416

Scott is a second-class township in Wayne County, Pennsylvania, United States. The township's population was 593 at the time of the 2010 United States Census.

== Geography ==
According to the United States Census Bureau, the township has a total area of 44.3 square miles (114.7 km^{2}), of which 43.5 square miles (113 km^{2}) is land and 0.8 square mile (2 km^{2}) (1.81%) is water.

== Demographics ==
Historical population
Census	Pop.	Note	%±
2010	593		—
2016 (est.)	567		−4.4%
U.S. Decennial Census

As of the census of 2010, there were 593 people, 236 households, and 171 families residing in the township. The population density was 13.6 inhabitants per square mile (5.3/km^{2}). There were 472 housing units at an average density of 10.9 per square mile (4.2/km^{2}). The racial makeup of the township was 98.5% White, 0.2% Black, 0.3% Native American, 0.5% Asian, and 0.5% from two or more races. Hispanic or Latino of any race were 1% of the population.

There were 236 households, out of which 24.2% had children under the age of 18 living with them, 64.0% were married couples living together, 5.5% had a female householder with no husband present, and 27.5% were non-families. 21.2% of all households were made up of individuals, and 10.2% had someone living alone who was 65 years of age or older. The average household size was 2.51 and the average family size was 2.90.

In the township the population was spread out, with 20.9% under the age of 18, 58.7% from 18 to 64, and 20.4% who were 65 years of age or older. The median age was 46.3 years.

The median income for a household in the township was $27,206, and the median income for a family was $34,412. Males had a median income of $33,750 versus $19,375 for females. The per capita income for the township was $20,336. About 6% of families and 6.3% of the population were below the poverty line, including 6.7% of those under age 18 and 3.6% of those age 65 or over.
