= Bloomville, New York =

- Census-designated place
- Location within New York
- Coordinates: 42°20′0″N 74°48′27″W
- Country: United States
- State: New York
- County: Delaware County
- Town: Kortright

Area
  - Total: 1.32 sq mi (3.43 km^{2})
  - Land: 1.32 sq mi (3.41 km^{2})
  - Water: 0.0077 sq mi (0.02 km^{2})
- Elevation: 1,455 ft (443 m)

Population (2020)
  - Total: 173
  - Density: 131.4/sq mi (50.73/km^{2})
- Time zone: UTC-5 (Eastern (EST))
  - Summer (DST): UTC-4 (EDT)
- ZIP code: 13739
- Area code: 607
- FIPS code: 36-07025
- GNIS feature ID: 944294

Bloomville is a hamlet and census-designated place (CDP) in the town of Kortright, Delaware County, New York, United States. As of the 2020 census, Bloomville had a population of 173.

== Geography ==
Bloomville is located in the West Branch Delaware River valley, north of the Catskill Mountains. Administratively part of Kortright, the Bloomville CDP has according to the United States Census Bureau, has a total area of 1.3 square miles (3.4 km^{2}), all land. Bloomville is in the southwestern corner of Kortright.

New York State Route 10 passes through the hamlet, leading southwest 7 miles (11 km) to Delhi, the county seat, and northeast 12 miles (19 km) to Stamford.

The west end of the Catskill Scenic Trail, a rail-trail following the route of the former Ulster and Delaware Railroad, is in Bloomville. There is a parking lot just across Route 10 from the trailhead.

== Demographics ==
Historical population
Census	Pop.	Note	%±
2020	173		—
U.S. Decennial Census

== Culture ==
The Bloomville Methodist Episcopal Church and McArthur-Martin Hexadecagon Barn are listed on the National Register of Historic Places.

A local restaurant, Table on Ten, was featured in Conde Nast Traveler and other culinary publications in 2014. Table on Ten closed in 2021 and its former location was bought by Alison Roman and converted into a food store in 2023.
