= West Branch Delaware River =

West Branch Mohock Branch
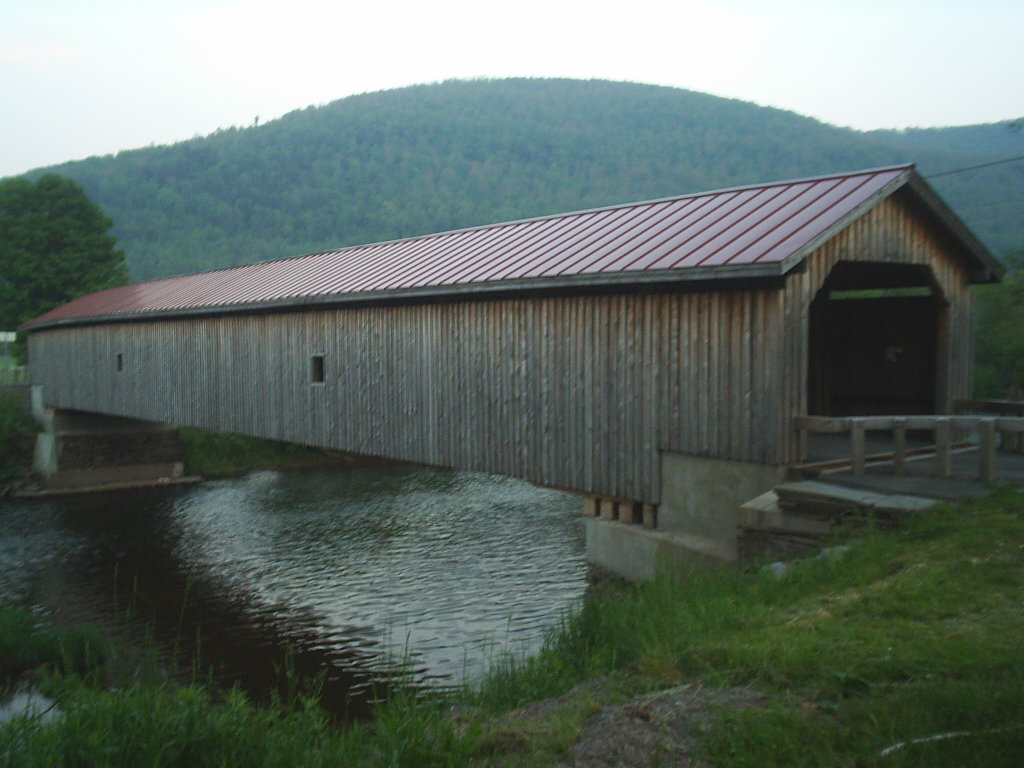
- West Branch flowing under the Hamden Covered Bridge

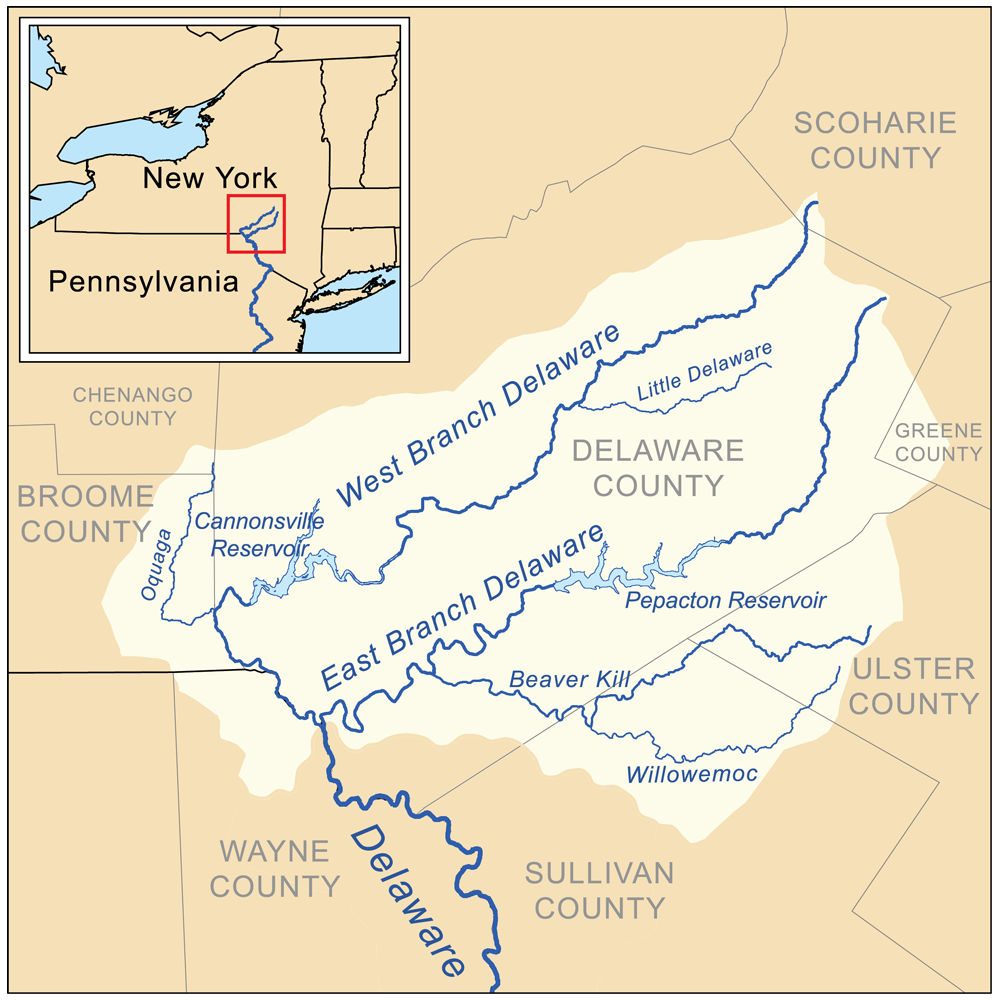
- Map of the upper Delaware River watershed, showing major tributaries

Location
- Country: United States
- State: New York
- Region: Catskills
- Counties: Schoharie, Delaware
- Towns: Stamford, Delhi, Hancock, Deposit

Physical characteristics
- Source: Unnamed spring
  - location: Between Woodchuck Hill and Mine Hill in Jefferson, Schoharie County, New York
  - coordinates: 42°27′16″N 74°36′01″W
- Mouth: Delaware River
  - location: Hancock
  - coordinates: 41°56′20″N 75°16′45″W
  - elevation: 883 ft (269 m)
- Length: 90 mi (140 km)
- Basin size: 666 mi^{2} (1,720 km^{2})
- Discharge
  - location: Walton
  - average: 469 cu ft (13.3 m^{3})
  - minimum: 12 cu ft (0.34 m^{3})
  - maximum: 28,600 cu ft (810 m^{3})
- Discharge
  - location: Hale Eddy
  - average: 780 cu ft (22 m^{3})
  - minimum: 17 cu ft (0.48 m^{3})
  - maximum: 43,400 cu ft (1,230 m^{3})

Basin features
- River system: Delaware River
- Tributaries
  - left: Little Delaware River
  - right: West Brook, Oquaga Creek

The West Branch Delaware River is one of two branches that form the Delaware River. It is approximately 90 mi (144 km) long, and flows through the U.S. states of New York and Pennsylvania. It winds through a mountainous area of New York in the western Catskill Mountains for most of its course, before joining the East Branch along the northeast border of Pennsylvania with New York. Midway or so it is impounded by the Cannonsville Dam to form the Cannonsville Reservoir, both part of the New York City water supply system for delivering drinking water to the City.

== Course ==
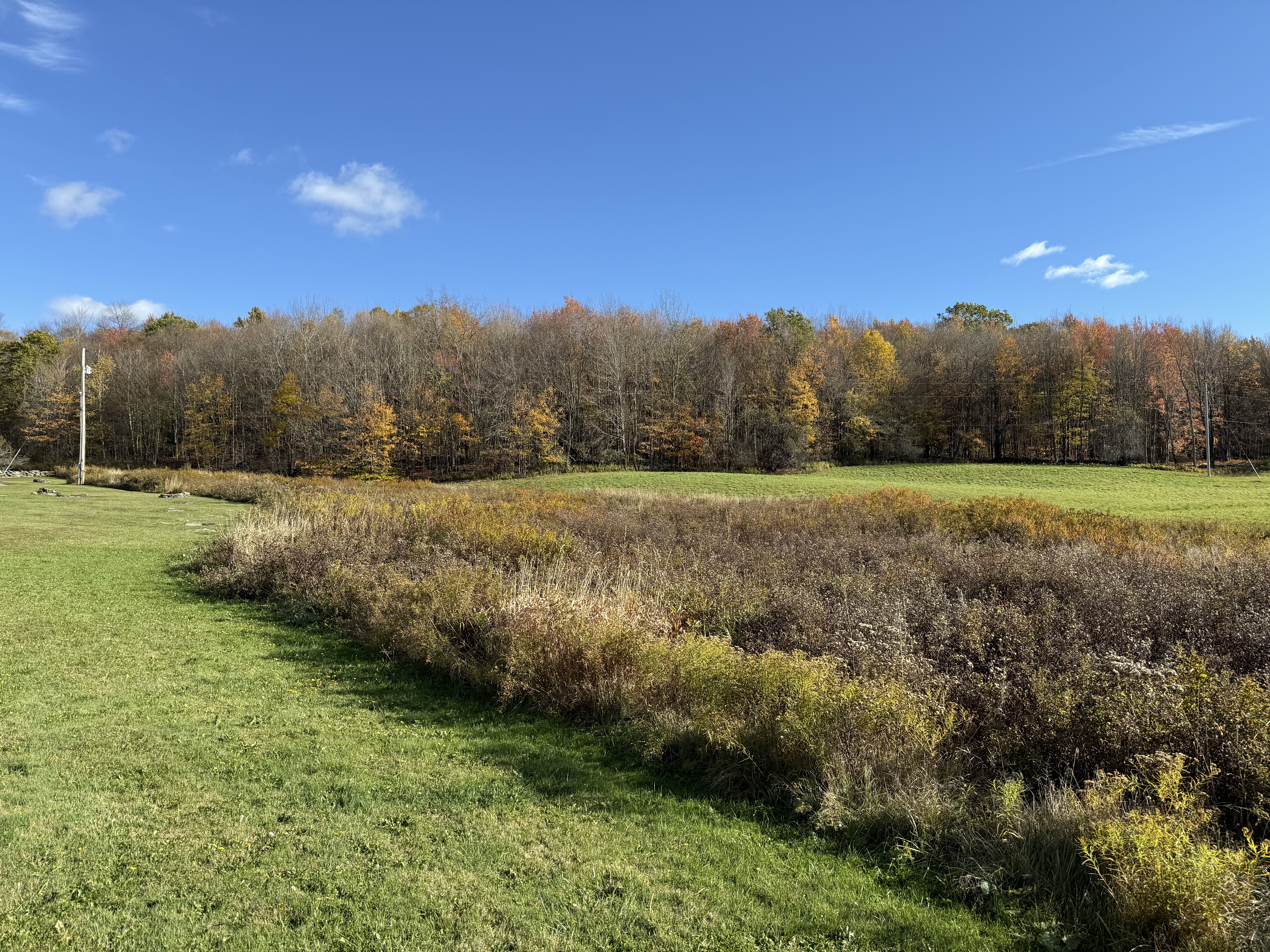
Headwaters of the West Branch Delaware River; the river flows audibly but nearly invisibly through the overgrown portion of the field

It rises in Jefferson, Schoharie County, New York and flows generally southwest, entering Delaware County and flowing past Stamford and Delhi. In southwestern Delaware County it flows in an increasingly winding course through the mountains, generally southwest. At Stilesville it is impounded to form the Cannonsville Reservoir. At Deposit, on the border between Broome and Delaware counties, it turns sharply to the southeast and is paralleled by New York State Route 17. It joins the East Branch at Hancock to form the Delaware. For the lower 6 mi (10 km) it forms part of the boundary between New York and Pennsylvania.

== Hydrology ==
The United States Geological Survey (USGS) maintains many stream gauges along the West Branch Delaware River.

The station by the Village of Delhi, in operation since 1937, but making daily measurements since November 1996, is located .6 miles (0.97 km) upstream from the bridge on Route 28, and 1.9 miles (3.1 km) upstream from the confluence of the Little Delaware River. This station had a maximum discharge of about 13,000 cubic feet per second (370 m^{3}/s) and a gauge height of 9.8 feet (3.0 m) from floodmark on January 19, 1996 and a maximum gauge height of 12.53 feet (3.82 m) on August 28, 2011 as Hurricane Irene passed through the area. It had a minimum discharge of 2.6 cubic feet per second (0.074 m^{3}/s) on September 25, 1964 and a minimum gauge height of 1.72 feet (0.52 m) on September 16–17, 2016.

The Hobart station, in service since 2000, is located 300 feet (91 m) upstream from Maple Street in the Hamlet of Hobart. This station had a maximum discharge of about 995 cubic feet per second (28.2 m^{3}/s) and a gauge height of 3.22 feet (0.98 m) on August 28, 2011 caused by Hurricane Irene. It had a minimum discharge of .05 cubic feet per second (0.0014 m^{3}/s) on November 13, 2001 and November 19, 2001.

The Walton station, in service since 1950, is located 100 feet (30 m) downstream from West Brook in the Village of Walton. This station had a maximum discharge of about 28,600 cubic feet per second (810 m^{3}/s) and a gauge height of 16.85 feet (5.14 m) on June 28, 2006 during the 2006 Mid-Atlantic United States flood. It had a minimum discharge of 12 cubic feet per second (0.34 m^{3}/s) on September 15 and November 22, 1964.

The Hale Eddy station, in service since 1912, is located 9 miles (14 km) upstream from the confluence of East and West Branches. Since the construction of the Cannonsville Reseevoir this station had a maximum discharge of 43,400 cubic feet per second (1,230 m^{3}/s) and a gauge height of 19.1 feet (5.8 m) on June 28, 2006 during the 2006 Mid-Atlantic United States flood. It had a minimum discharge of 17 cubic feet per second (0.48 m^{3}/s) on October 20, 1963. The maximum discharge, prior to the construction of Cannonsville Reservoir in 1963, was 28,900 cubic feet per second (820 m^{3}/s) on March 22, 1948. Outside the period of record: In the flood of October 10, 1903 this station reached a discharge of roughly 46,000 cubic feet per second (1,300 m^{3}/s)

== Fishing ==
The West Branch is a tailwater fishery. This means the same cold water releases that keep it cooler in the summer, keep the river a little warmer in the winter and early spring. The upper section can be cleaner than other rivers during periods of heavy runoff. During high water on the Cannonsville Reservoir, many bait fish spill over the dam. These factors all provide an excellent environment for trout to thrive in.

The trout population in this river is naturally reproducing. During the warm months stocked trout from smaller and warmer tributaries will seek sanctuary in their cool water. The West Branch Delaware River was divided into two sections when the Cannonsville Reservoir was formed. Downstream of the Cannonsville Reservoir, there are large numbers of wild populations of brown trout and rainbow trout and an occasional brook trout can be caught although none are stocked. Seasonal anadromous runs of American shad with reports of occasional striped bass. This section is considered one of the best fly fishing trout streams in the United States, due to the cold water released from the reservoir.

== Tributaries ==
Not including tributaries of Cannonsville Reservoir

Right

- Basset Brook
- Lake Brook
- McMurdy Brook
- Betty Brook
- Kiff Brook
- Wright Brook
- Kidd Brook
- Elk Creek
- Falls Creek
- Steele Brook
- Peaks Brook
- Platner Brook
- East Brook
- West Brook
- Pines Brook
- Bobs Brook
- Wakeman Brook
- Cold Spring Creek
- Butler Brook
- Oquaga Creek
- Sherman Creek
- Faulkner Brook
- Balls Creek

Left

- Town Brook
- Rose Brook
- Little Delaware River
- Bagley Brook
- Mallory Brook
- Weeds Brook
- Beers Brook
- Chase Brook
- Whitaker Brook
- Roods Creek
- Travis Brook
- Sands Creek

== See also ==
- List of rivers of New York
- List of rivers of Pennsylvania
