= Walton (village), New York =

Walton, New York
- Village
- Location within the state of New York
- Coordinates: 42°10′11″N 75°7′49″W
- Country: United States
- State: New York
- County: Delaware
- Town: Walton

Area
  - Total: 1.60 sq mi (4.15 km^{2})
  - Land: 1.54 sq mi (3.99 km^{2})
  - Water: 0.058 sq mi (0.15 km^{2})
- Elevation: 1,207 ft (368 m)

Population (2020)
  - Total: 2,885
  - Density: 1,870.5/sq mi (722.21/km^{2})
- Time zone: UTC-5 (Eastern (EST))
  - Summer (DST): UTC-4 (EDT)
- ZIP code: 13856
- Area code: 607
- FIPS code: 36-78036
- GNIS feature ID: 0970747
- Website: villageofwalton.com

Walton is a village in the town of Walton in Delaware County, New York, United States. As of the 2010 census, the village population was 3,088.

Walton is the home of the annual Delaware County Fair, which is typically held in August.

There are three primary and secondary schools in Walton: Townsend Elementary School, Mack Middle School, and O'Neill High School.

== History ==
The Christ Episcopal Church, First Congregational Church of Walton, Gardiner Place Historic District, U.S. Post Office, and the Walton Grange 1454-Former Armory, all listed on the National Register of Historic Places, are located in the village.

Walton is the birthplace of William B. Ogden (born June 15, 1805), the first mayor of Chicago and a founder of the Chicago & Northwestern Railroad line.

Walton has suffered from major flooding in 1996 and 2006.

== Geography ==
The village is located at the center of the town of Walton, along the West Branch Delaware River. New York State Route 10 passes through the village, leading northeast 16 miles (26 km) to Delhi and southwest 27 miles (43 km) to Deposit. New York State Route 206 joins NY 10 in the village center and leads northwest 23 miles (37 km) to Bainbridge and southeast 10 miles (16 km) to Downsville. It is in close proximity to Agloe, the fictional town created to prevent copyright infringement of a mapping company.

According to the United States Census Bureau, the village of Walton has a total area of 1.6 square miles (4.2 km^{2}), of which 1.5 square miles (4.0 km^{2}) is land and 0.1 square miles (0.2 km^{2}), or 3.73%, is water.

=== Climate ===
Climate data for Walton 2, New York, 1991–2020 normals, 1997–2023 extremes: 1480ft (451m)
Month	Jan	Feb	Mar	Apr	May	Jun	Jul	Aug	Sep	Oct	Nov	Dec	Year
Record high °F (°C)	63 (17)	73 (23)	85 (29)	91 (33)	90 (32)	91 (33)	94 (34)	97 (36)	91 (33)	85 (29)	75 (24)	66 (19)	97 (36)
Mean maximum °F (°C)	53.9 (12.2)	54.9 (12.7)	66.0 (18.9)	78.9 (26.1)	85.2 (29.6)	87.7 (30.9)	88.6 (31.4)	87.6 (30.9)	85.0 (29.4)	77.9 (25.5)	67.0 (19.4)	57.0 (13.9)	90.7 (32.6)
Mean daily maximum °F (°C)	31.5 (−0.3)	34.2 (1.2)	42.5 (5.8)	55.6 (13.1)	66.8 (19.3)	74.6 (23.7)	78.8 (26.0)	77.7 (25.4)	71.3 (21.8)	59.6 (15.3)	47.2 (8.4)	36.1 (2.3)	56.3 (13.5)
Daily mean °F (°C)	21.4 (−5.9)	22.9 (−5.1)	30.8 (−0.7)	43.2 (6.2)	53.7 (12.1)	62.3 (16.8)	66.6 (19.2)	65.7 (18.7)	59.0 (15.0)	47.8 (8.8)	37.0 (2.8)	27.5 (−2.5)	44.8 (7.1)
Mean daily minimum °F (°C)	11.4 (−11.4)	11.5 (−11.4)	19.1 (−7.2)	30.8 (−0.7)	40.5 (4.7)	50.1 (10.1)	54.5 (12.5)	53.8 (12.1)	46.7 (8.2)	35.9 (2.2)	26.8 (−2.9)	18.9 (−7.3)	33.3 (0.7)
Mean minimum °F (°C)	−10.3 (−23.5)	−7.2 (−21.8)	0.1 (−17.7)	16.7 (−8.5)	25.7 (−3.5)	35.3 (1.8)	43.0 (6.1)	42.4 (5.8)	33.3 (0.7)	23.6 (−4.7)	11.6 (−11.3)	0.4 (−17.6)	−12.9 (−24.9)
Record low °F (°C)	−21 (−29)	−21 (−29)	−15 (−26)	6 (−14)	20 (−7)	27 (−3)	29 (−2)	38 (3)	25 (−4)	18 (−8)	−10 (−23)	−17 (−27)	−21 (−29)
Average precipitation inches (mm)	3.50 (89)	2.62 (67)	3.52 (89)	4.16 (106)	4.18 (106)	4.96 (126)	4.53 (115)	5.15 (131)	4.63 (118)	4.67 (119)	3.66 (93)	3.56 (90)	49.14 (1,249)
Average snowfall inches (cm)	22.1 (56)	22.3 (57)	16.2 (41)	3.2 (8.1)	0.5 (1.3)	0.0 (0.0)	0.0 (0.0)	0.0 (0.0)	0.0 (0.0)	0.8 (2.0)	6.8 (17)	19.9 (51)	91.8 (233.4)
Average precipitation days (≥ 0.01 in)	17.1	13.0	13.7	13.3	15.7	14.2	12.7	13.2	12.0	14.8	14.2	16.5	170.4
Average snowy days (≥ 0.1 in)	13	10	7	2	0	0	0	0	0	1	4	10	47
Source 1: NOAA
Source 2: XMACIS2 (extremes & 1997-2020 snowfall/days)

== Demographics ==
Historical population
Census	Pop.	Note	%±
1870	866		—
1880	1,389		60.4%
1890	2,299		65.5%
1900	2,811		22.3%
1910	3,103		10.4%
1920	3,598		16.0%
1930	3,496		−2.8%
1940	3,697		5.7%
1950	3,947		6.8%
1960	3,855		−2.3%
1970	3,744		−2.9%
1980	3,329		−11.1%
1990	3,326		−0.1%
2000	3,070		−7.7%
2010	3,088		0.6%
2020	2,885		−6.6%
U.S. Decennial Census

As of the census of 2000, there were 3,070 people, 1,366 households, and 818 families residing in the village. The population density was 1,945.2 inhabitants per square mile (751.0/km^{2}). There were 1,514 housing units at an average density of 959.3 per square mile (370.4/km^{2}). The racial makeup of the village was 97.92% White, 0.33% Black or African American, 0.39% Native American, 0.33% Asian, 0.13% from other races, and 0.91% from two or more races. Hispanic or Latino of any race were 1.37% of the population.

There were 1,366 households, out of which 28.6% had children under the age of 18 living with them, 42.2% were married couples living together, 13.8% had a female householder with no husband present, and 40.1% were non-families. 34.9% of all households were made up of individuals, and 16.2% had someone living alone who was 65 years of age or older. The average household size was 2.22 and the average family size was 2.83.

In the village, the population was spread out, with 24.2% under the age of 18, 6.7% from 18 to 24, 26.1% from 25 to 44, 23.5% from 45 to 64, and 19.4% who were 65 years of age or older. The median age was 41 years. For every 100 females, there were 87.5 males. For every 100 females age 18 and over, there were 83.8 males.

The median income for a household in the village was $26,550, and the median income for a family was $40,122. Males had a median income of $26,744 versus $19,839 for females. The per capita income for the village was $16,269. About 8.0% of families and 12.4% of the population were below the poverty line, including 11.0% of those under age 18 and 11.1% of those age 65 or over.

== Notable people ==
- Joel Tyler Headley was a 19th-century author, historian, newspaper editor, and New York politician who was born in Walton.
- William B. Ogden was born in Walton. The local library is named in his honor.
- William Walton, nephew of William Walton (merchant), was the owner of a 22,000 acre parcel of land which composes most of Walton. Parts of this parcel were sold off to his friends as the village was settled. The town and village are both named after him.

== Media ==
- Newspaper: The Walton Reporter, published since 1881
- Radio: WDLA-AM 1270 & WDLA-FM 92.1
- Cable: Charter Spectrum
- The Boulder, Colorado jam band/ bluegrass/ grassroots genre band String Cheese Incident mentions Walton in the song "100 Year Flood". The entire song is written in reference to the devastation of the flood in 1996.
- Debra Sundstrom was featured in an episode of Deadline: Crime with Tamron Hall titled "Harvesting Murder" after a double murder-suicide that involved her husband sealed in a 55-gallon barrel.
- Walton High School had a school shooting involving one victim in December 1992. The shooter, a 15-year-old boy who was raised in Walton, was the son of the now-closed Hodges Power Equipment owner. The victim, a high school English teacher, was shot in the face and survived.
