= Mount Jefferson =

Mount Jefferson may refer to:

- List of peaks named Mount Jefferson
  - Mount Jefferson (Bitterroot Range), mountain in both Fremont County, Idaho and Beaverhead County, Montana
  - Mount Jefferson (Massachusetts)
  - Mount Jefferson (Maine)
  - Mount Jefferson (Madison County, Montana)
  - Mount Jefferson (North Carolina)
  - Mount Jefferson (New Hampshire)
  - Mount Jefferson (Nevada)
  - Mount Jefferson (New York)
  - Mount Jefferson (Oregon)
  - Mount Jefferson (Virginia)
- Mount Jefferson, Ohio, unincorporated community in Loramie Township, Shelby County, Ohio
