= List of peaks named Mount Jefferson =

Mount Jefferson is a common name for mountains in the United States, usually referring to Thomas Jefferson, the country's third president. The mountains include:

Name	USGS link	State	County	USGS map	Coordinates	Elevation	
Mount Jefferson		Arkansas	Perry	Gleason	35°06′01″N 092°34′01″W	149 m	489 ft
Mount Jefferson		Idaho	Fremont	Mount Jefferson	44°33′43″N 111°30′13″W	3,112 m	10,210 ft
Mount Jefferson		Massachusetts	Worcester	Barre	42°29′30″N 072°02′24″W	368 m	1,207 ft
Mount Jefferson		Maine	Penobscot	Lee	45°21′08″N 068°16′58″W	229 m	751 ft
Mount Jefferson		Montana	Madison	Noble Peak	45°36′14″N 112°00′24″W	3,083 m	10,115 ft
Mount Jefferson		North Carolina	Ashe	Jefferson	36°24′11″N 081°27′48″W	1,407 m	4,616 ft
Mount Jefferson		New Hampshire	Coos	Mount Washington	44°18′16″N 071°19′05″W	1,741 m	5,712 ft
Mount Jefferson		Nevada	Nye	Mount Jefferson	38°45′08″N 116°55′36″W	3,601 m	11,814 ft
Mount Jefferson		New York	Schoharie	Stamford	42°27′30″N 074°37′12″W	833 m	2,733 ft
Mount Jefferson		Oregon	Linn	Mount Jefferson	44°40′27.48″N 121°47′58.46″W	3,189 m	10,463 ft
Jefferson Mountain		South Carolina	Cherokee	Kings Creek	35°04′16″N 081°29′43″W	263 m	863 ft
Mount Jefferson		Virginia	Albemarle	Charlottesville West	38°01′57″N 078°31′21″W	258 m	846 ft
Jefferson Mountain		Virginia	Rappahannock	Massies Corner	38°42′13″N 078°02′05″W	268 m	879 ft
