= Delaware River =

Major river on the East Coast of the United States

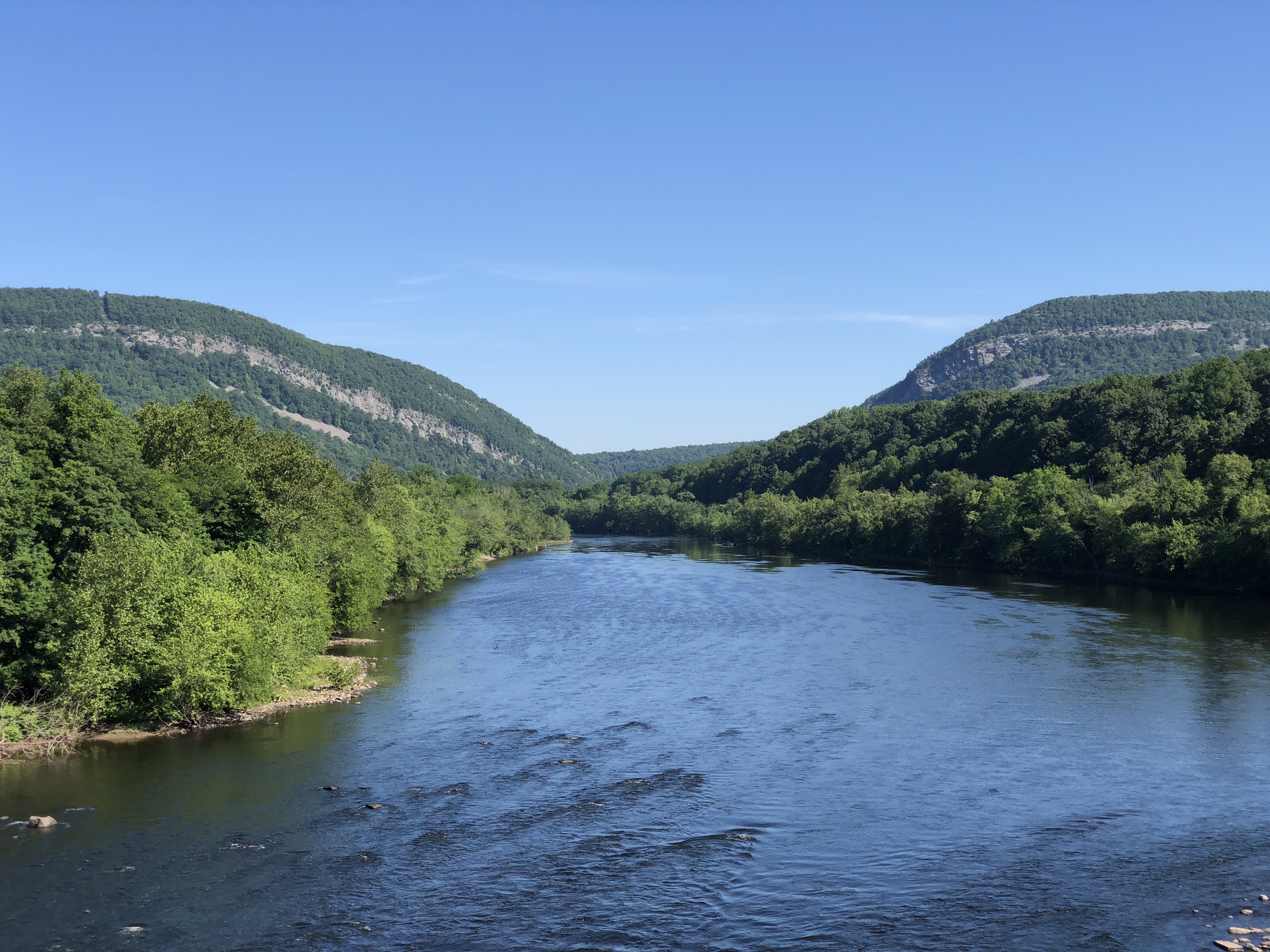
- The Delaware River flowing through the Delaware Water Gap between Northampton County, Pennsylvania (left) and Warren County, New Jersey in (right)

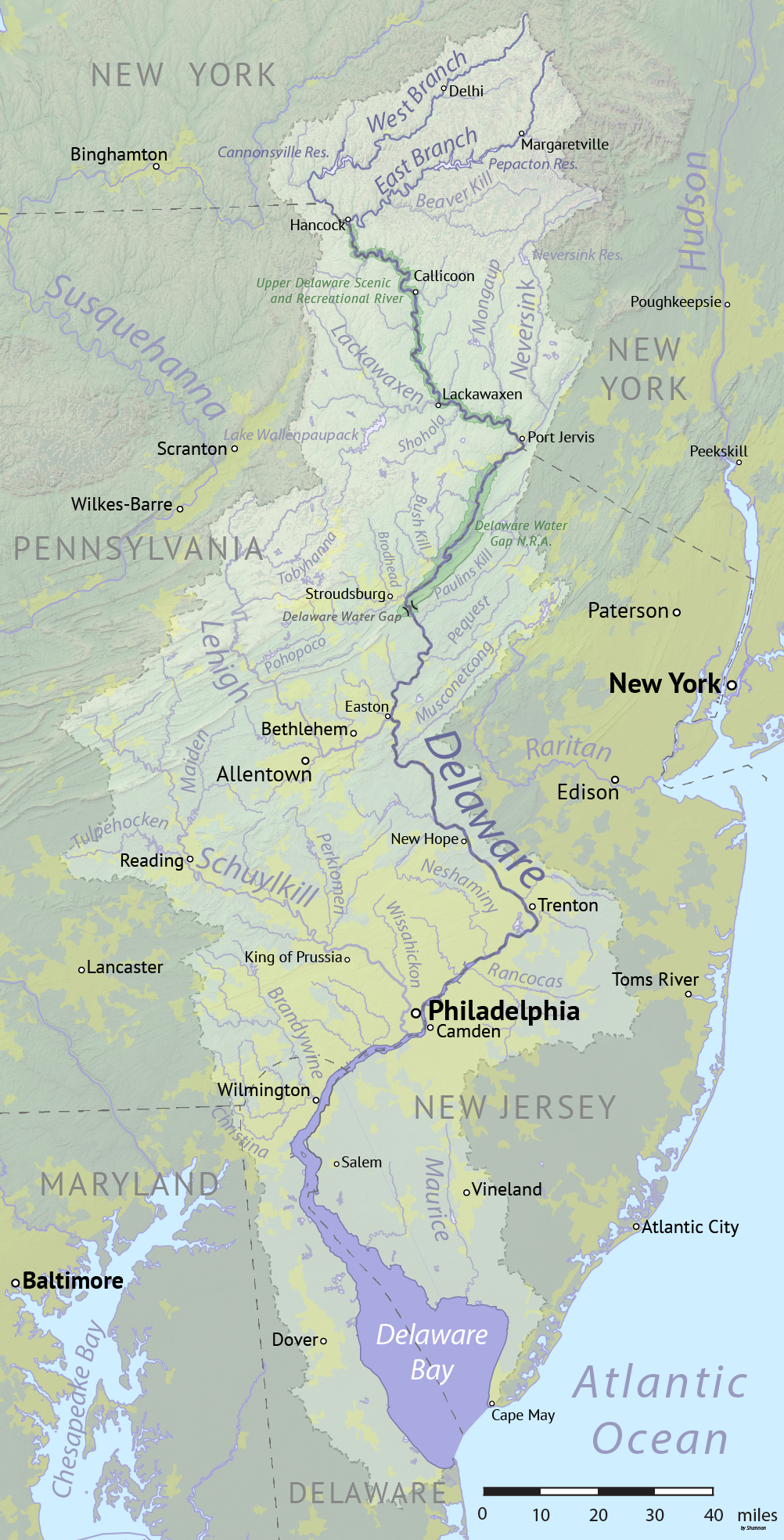
- Map of the Delaware River watershed, showing major tributaries and cities

Location
- Country: United States
- State: New York, New Jersey, Pennsylvania, Delaware U.S.
- Cities: Margaretville, NY, Delhi, NY, Deposit, NY, Hancock, NY, Callicoon, NY, Lackawaxen, PA, Port Jervis, NY, Stroudsburg, PA, Easton, PA, New Hope, PA, Trenton, NJ, Camden, NJ, Philadelphia, PA, Chester, PA, Wilmington, DE, Salem, NJ, Dover, DE

Physical characteristics
- Source: West Branch
  - location: Mount Jefferson, Town of Jefferson, Schoharie County, New York, United States
  - coordinates: 42°27′12″N 74°36′26″W
  - elevation: 2,240 ft (680 m)
- 2nd source: East Branch
  - location: Grand Gorge, Town of Roxbury, Delaware County, New York, United States
  - coordinates: 42°21′26″N 74°30′42″W
  - elevation: 1,560 ft (480 m)
- Source confluence
  - location: Town of Hancock, Delaware County, New York, United States
  - coordinates: 41°56′20″N 75°16′46″W
  - elevation: 880 ft (270 m)
- Mouth: Delaware Bay
  - location: Delaware, United States
  - coordinates: 39°25′13″N 75°31′11″W
  - elevation: 0 ft (0 m)
- Length: 282 miles (454 km) to Delaware Bay; 330 miles (530 km) to the Atlantic Ocean
- Basin size: 13,539 sq mi (35,070 km^{2})
- Discharge
  - location: Trenton
  - average: 12,100 cu ft/s (340 m^{3}/s)
  - minimum: 4,310 cu ft/s (122 m^{3}/s)
  - maximum: 329,000 cu ft/s (9,300 m^{3}/s)
- Discharge
  - location: Port Jervis
  - average: 7,900 cu ft/s (220 m^{3}/s)282 miles (454 km)
  - minimum: 1,420 cu ft/s (40 m^{3}/s)
  - maximum: 52,900 cu ft/s (1,500 m^{3}/s)

Basin features
- Tributaries
  - left: Neversink River, Pequest River, Musconetcong River
  - right: Lehigh River, Schuylkill River, Christina River

National Wild and Scenic River
- Type: Scenic, Recreational

The Delaware River is a major river in the Mid-Atlantic region of the United States and is the longest free-flowing (undammed) river in the Eastern United States. From the meeting of its branches in Hancock, New York, the river flows for 282 miles (454 km) along the borders of (north to south): New York, Pennsylvania, New Jersey, and Delaware, before emptying into Delaware Bay.

The river has been recognized by the National Wildlife Federation as one of the country's Great Waters and has been called the "Lifeblood of the Northeast" by American Rivers. Its watershed drains an area of 13,539 square miles (35,070 km^{2}) and provides drinking water for 17 million people, including half of New York City via the Delaware Aqueduct.

The Delaware River has two branches that rise in the Catskill Mountains of New York: the West Branch at Mount Jefferson in Jefferson, Schoharie County, and the East Branch at Grand Gorge, Delaware County. The branches merge to form the main Delaware River at Hancock, New York. Flowing south, the river remains relatively undeveloped, with 152 miles (245 km) protected as the Upper, Middle, and Lower Delaware National Scenic Rivers. At Trenton, New Jersey, the Delaware becomes tidal, navigable, and more industrial. This section forms the backbone of the Philadelphia metropolitan area, serving the port cities of Philadelphia, Camden, New Jersey, and Wilmington, Delaware. The river flows into Delaware Bay at Liston Point, 48 miles (77 km) upstream of the bay's outlet to the Atlantic Ocean, between Cape May and Cape Henlopen.

Before the arrival of European settlers, the river was the homeland of the Lenape native people. They called the river Lënapei Sipu or Lenapewihittuk, meaning Lenape River, and Kithanne, meaning the largest river in this part of the country.

In 1609, the river was visited by a Dutch East India Company expedition led by Henry Hudson, an English navigator hired to find a western route to Cathay (China). His encounters set the stage for Dutch colonization of North America in the 17th century. Early Dutch and Swedish settlements were established along the lower section of the river and Delaware Bay. Both colonial powers called the river the South River (Zuidrivier), distinguishing it from the North River—today’s Hudson River. After the English expelled the Dutch and took control of the New Netherland colony in 1664, the river was renamed Delaware after Sir Thomas West, 3rd Baron De La Warr, an English nobleman and the Virginia colony's first royal governor, who defended the colony during the First Anglo-Powhatan War. George Washington's crossing of the Delaware River in 1776 led victory in the Battle of Trenton, a pivotal moment in the American Revolution.

== Name ==
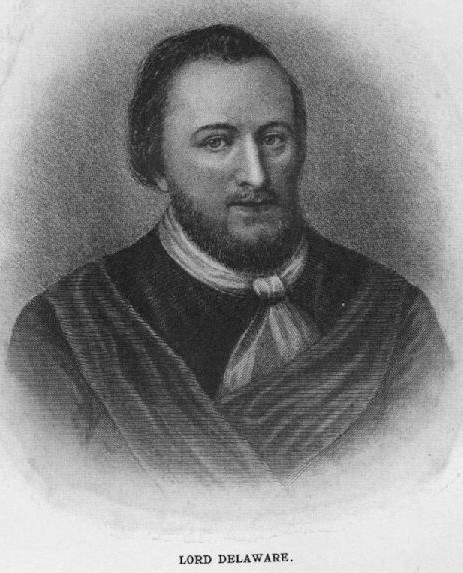
Thomas West, 3rd Baron De La Warr, the river's namesake

The Delaware River is named in honor of Thomas West, 3rd Baron De La Warr (1577–1618), an English nobleman and the Virginia colony's first royal governor, who defended the colony during the First Anglo-Powhatan War. Lord de la Warr waged a punitive campaign to subdue the Powhatan after they had killed the colony's council president, John Ratcliffe, and attacked the colony's fledgling settlements. Lord de la Warr arrived with 150 soldiers in time to prevent the colony's original settlers at Jamestown from giving up and returning to England and is credited with saving the Virginia colony. The name of the barony (later an earldom) is pronounced as in the current spelling form "Delaware" (/ˈdɛləwɛər/ DEL-ə-wair) and is thought to derive from French de la Guerre.

It has often been reported that the river and bay received the name "Delaware" after English forces under Richard Nicolls expelled the Dutch and took control of the New Netherland colony in 1664. However, the river and bay were known by the name Delaware as early as 1641. The state of Delaware was originally part of the William Penn's Pennsylvania colony. In 1682, the Duke of York granted Penn's request for access to the sea and leased him the territory along the western shore of Delaware Bay, which became known as the "Lower Counties on the Delaware". In 1704, the Lower Counties were given political autonomy to form a separate provincial assembly, but they shared Pennsylvania's provincial governor until the two colonies separated on June 15, 1776, and they remained separate as states after the establishment of the United States.

The name "Delaware" also came to be used as a collective name for the Lenape, a Native American people who inhabited an area of the basins of the Susquehanna River, Delaware River, and lower Hudson River in the northeastern United States at the time of European settlement, as well as for their language. As a result of disruption following the French and Indian War, American Revolutionary War, and the later Indian removals from the eastern United States, the name "Delaware" has been spread with the Lenape's diaspora to municipalities, counties and other geographical features in the American Midwest and Canada. The Lenape refer to this river as the Lënapei Sipu, Lenapewihittuck, or Kithanna.

== Length ==
The length of the main stem of the Delaware River from the confluence of its branches to the head of Delaware Bay at Liston Point is 282 miles (454 km). However, the river's tidal estuary widens gradually, and there is no clear hydrological dividing point between the river and the bay. Liston Point is considered the head of Delaware Bay only by legal agreement between New Jersey and Delaware, as marked by a pair of survey monuments. As such, some observers may include the entire 48-mile (77 km) length of Delaware Bay from Liston Point to the Atlantic Ocean in the length of the river, giving the Delaware River an overall length of 330 miles (530 km).

At either length the main stem of the Delaware River is the longest free-flowing river in the Eastern United States. "Free-flowing" means the river is not impounded by dams and its course is not significantly altered or diverted. Idaho's Salmon River is the longest free-flowing river in the contiguous United States, at 425 miles (684 km).

There are two wing dams on the river, one between Lambertville and New Hope and one between Lumberville and Bulls Island at Raven Rock. The wing dams affect the accumulation of sediment but do not cross the entire width of the river. The Lumberville Wing Dam was built to divert water into the feeder canal of the Delaware and Raritan Canal. Many tributaries of the Delaware River are dammed or diverted, including its two upper branches. Cannonsville Reservoir impounds the West Branch and Pepacton Reservoir impounds the East Branch, controlling the release of water in to the main stem Delaware River.

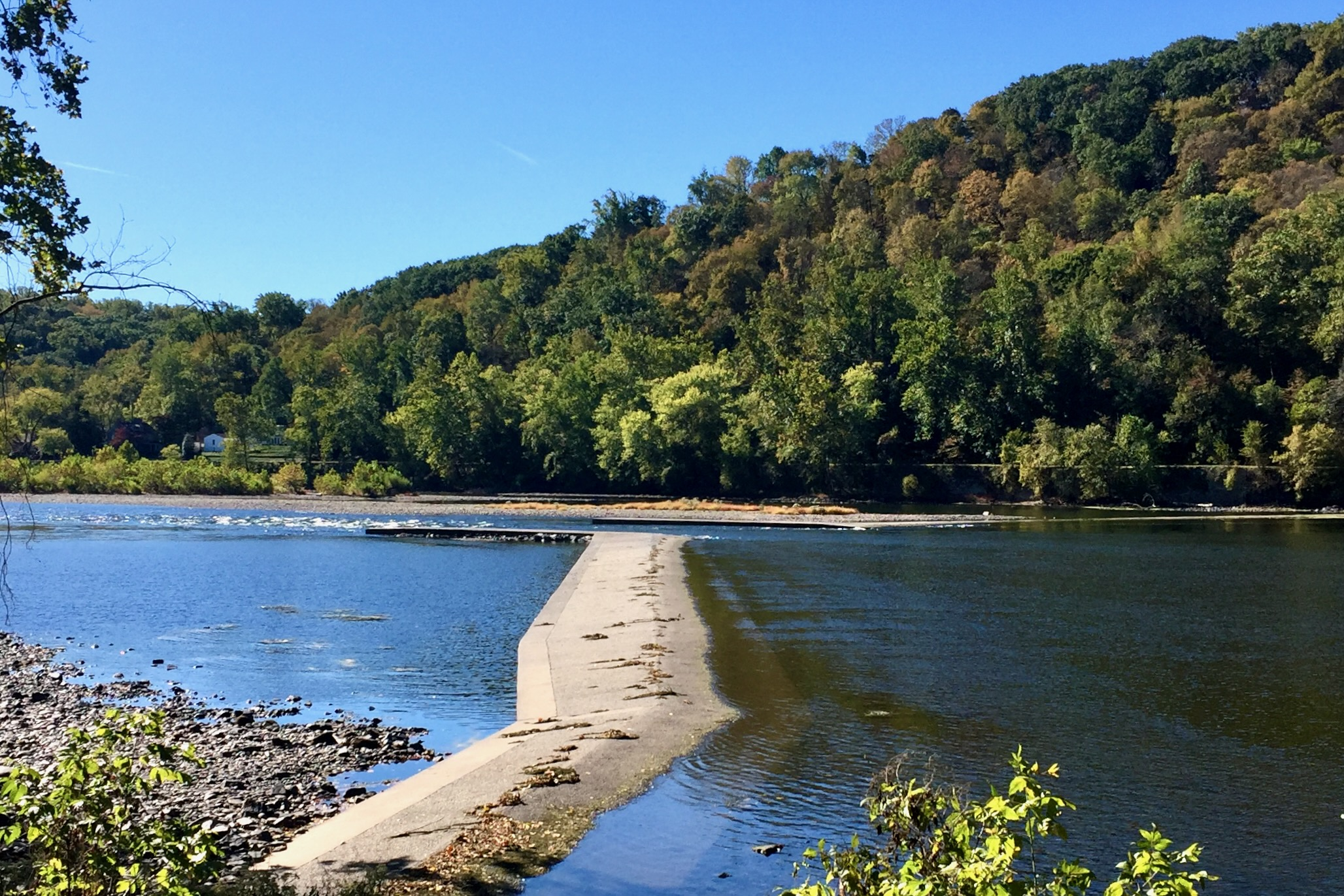
Lumberville Wing Dam

== Watershed ==
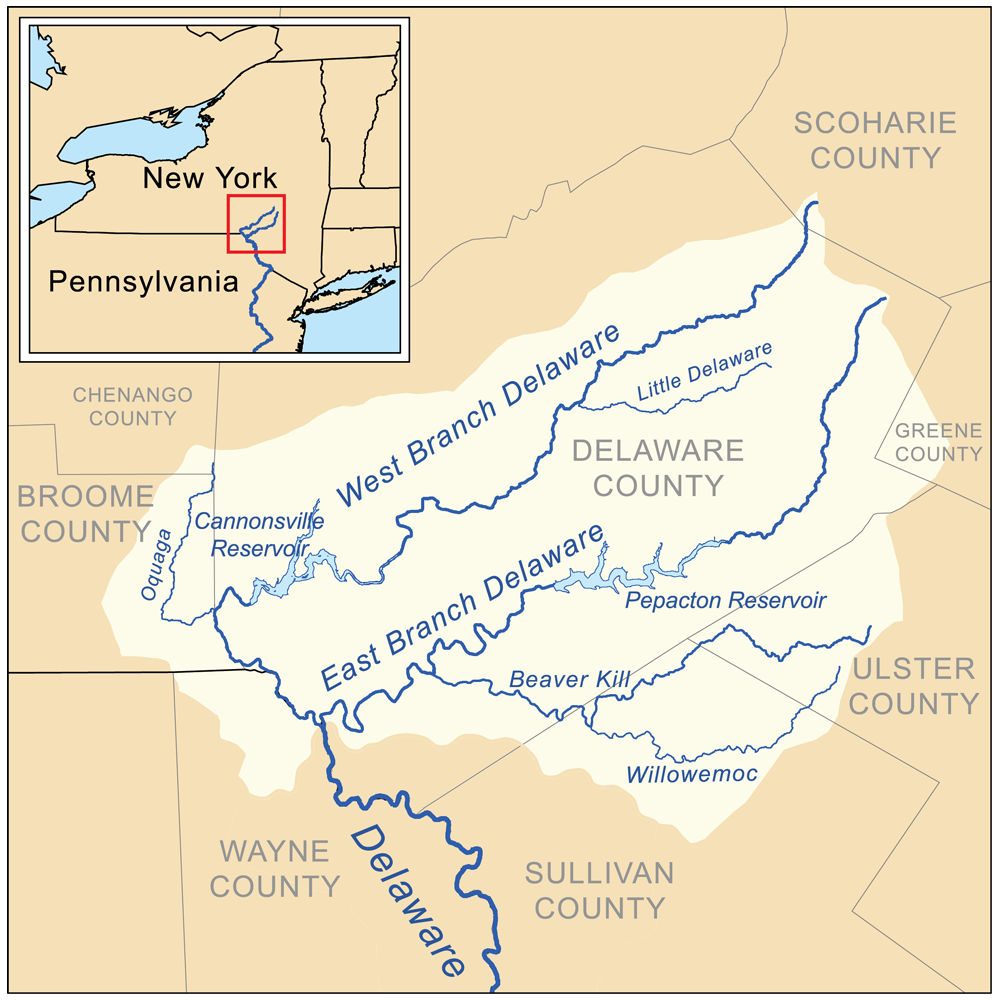
The headwaters of the Delaware River, including the river's East and West Branches and other tributaries

The Delaware River's drainage basin has an area of 13,539 square miles (35,070 km^{2}) and encompasses 42 counties and 838 municipalities in five U.S. states: New York, New Jersey, Pennsylvania, Maryland, and Delaware. This total area constitutes approximately 0.4% of the land mass in the United States. In 2001, the watershed was 18% agricultural land, 14% developed land, and 68% forested land.

There are 216 tributary streams and creeks comprising an estimated 14,057 miles of streams and creeks, in the watershed. While the watershed is home to 4.17 million people according to the 2000 Federal Census, these bodies of water provide drinking water to 17 million people—roughly 6% of the population of the United States. The waters of the Delaware River's basin are used to sustain "fishing, transportation, power, cooling, recreation, and other industrial and residential purposes." It is the 33rd largest river in the United States in terms of flow, but is among the nation's most heavily used rivers in daily freight tonnage. The average annual flow rate of the Delaware is 11,700 cubic feet per second at Trenton, New Jersey. With no dams or impediments on the river's main stem, the Delaware is one of the few remaining large free-flowing rivers in the United States.

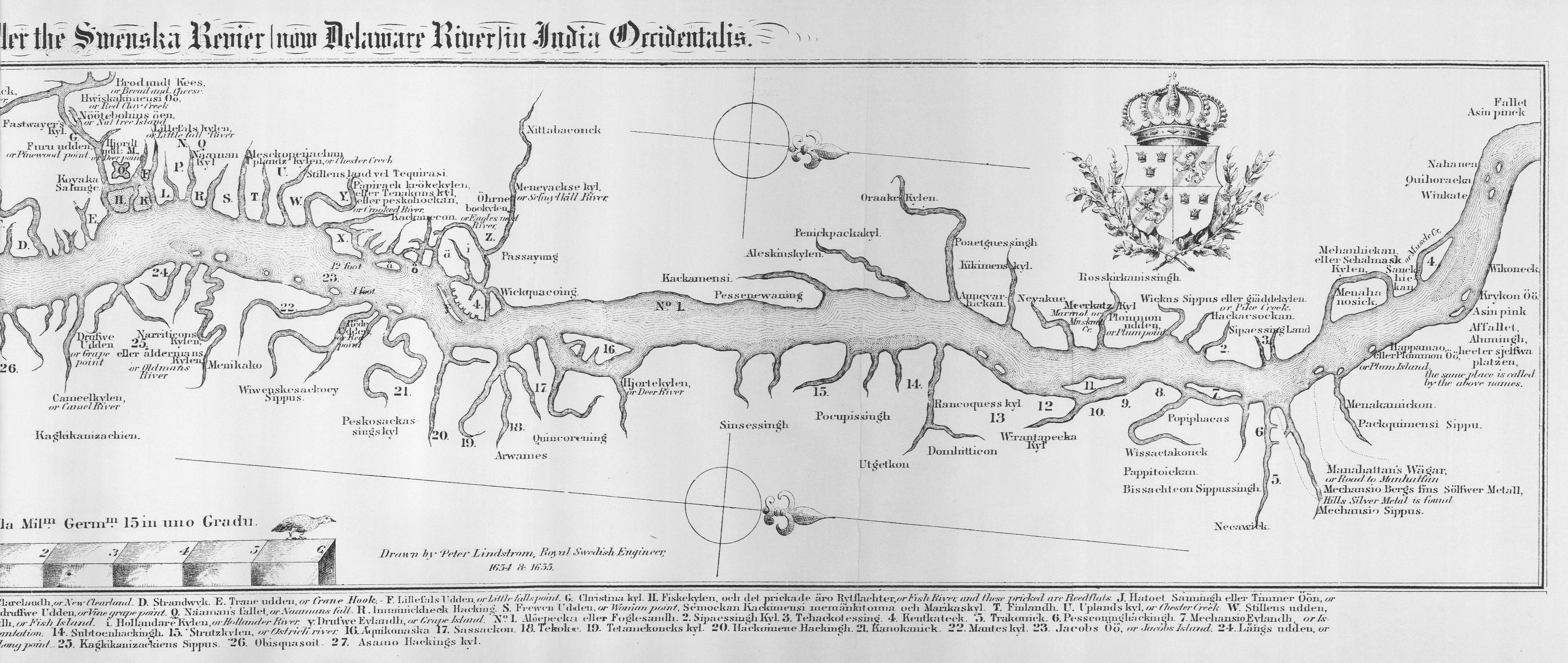
A 1655 Swedish nautical chart showing part of the Delaware River when the river was part of the Swedish colony New Sweden
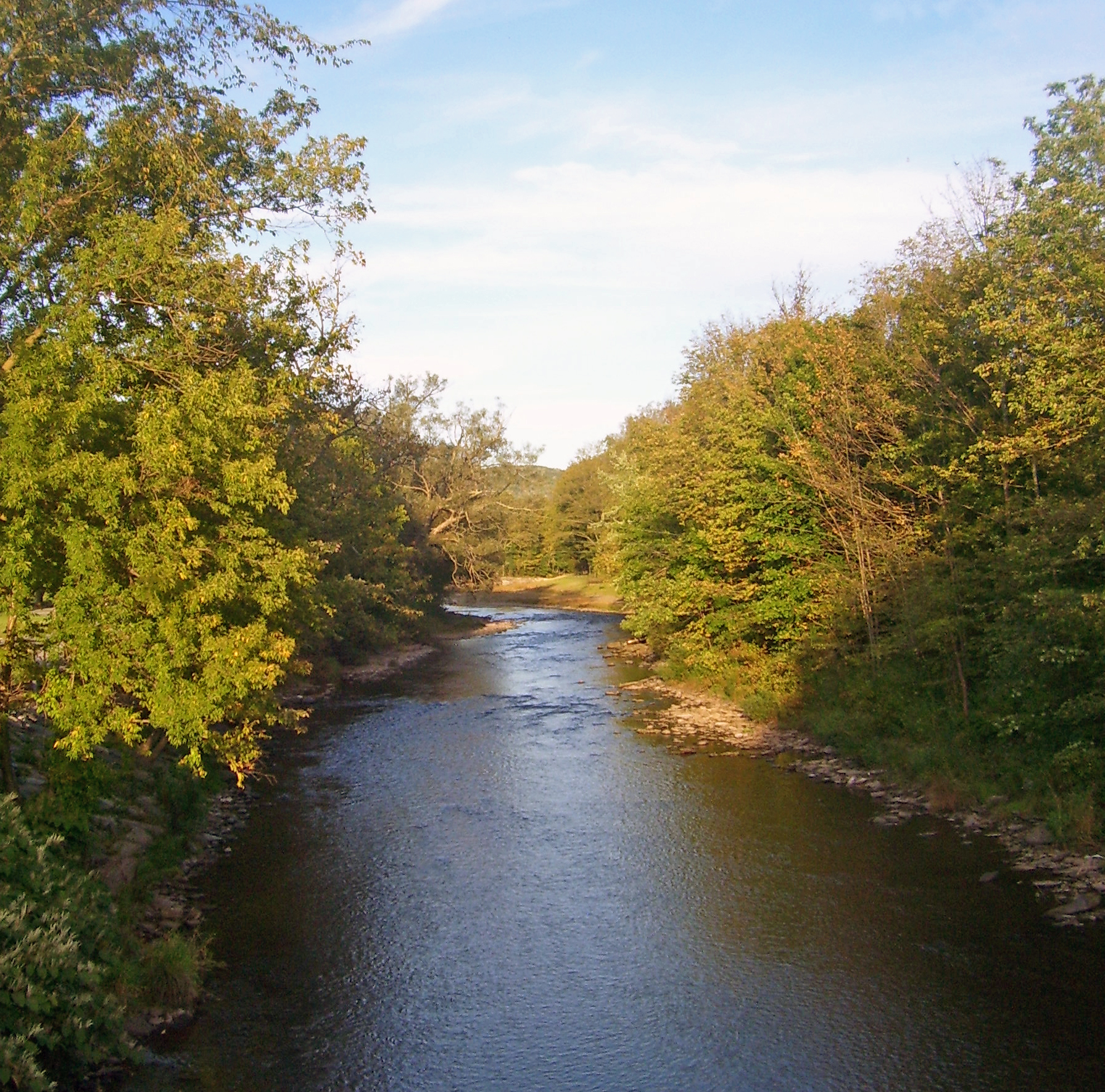
East Branch of the Delaware River near Margaretville, New York

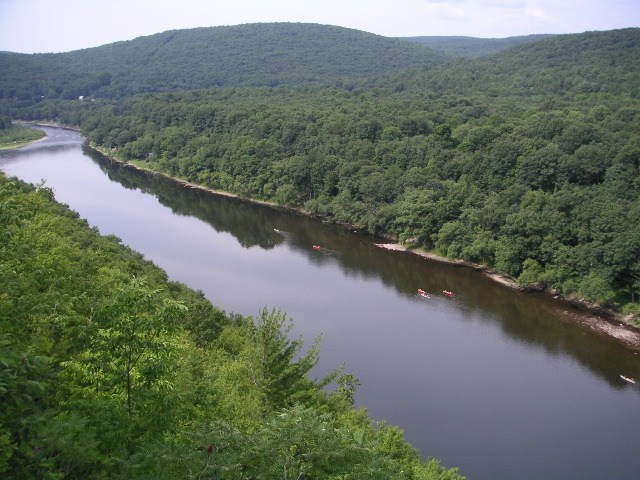
Canoeing on the river at Hawk's Nest (Orange County, New York)

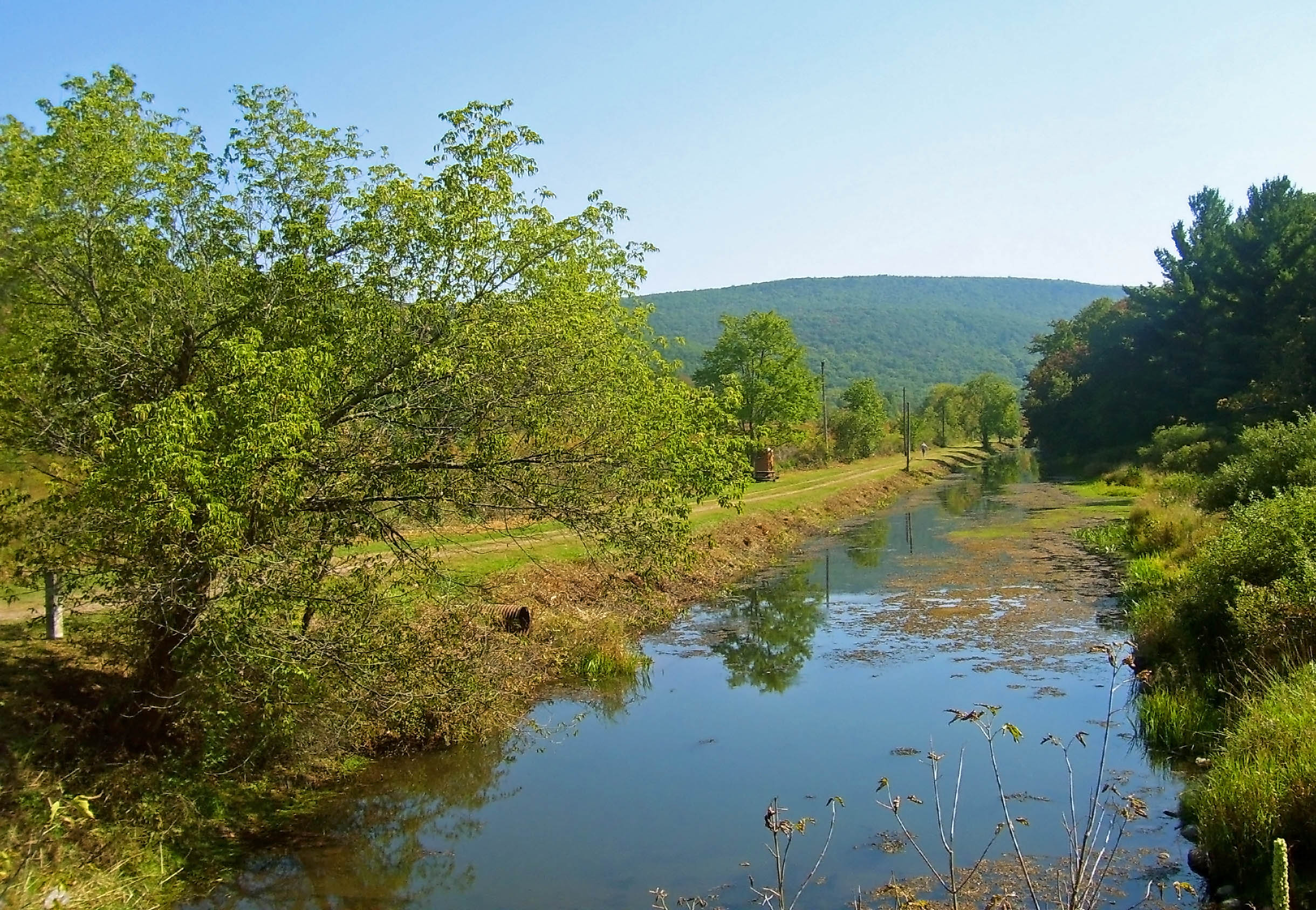
A still remaining section of the Delaware and Hudson Canal seen from U.S. 209 near Summitville, New York

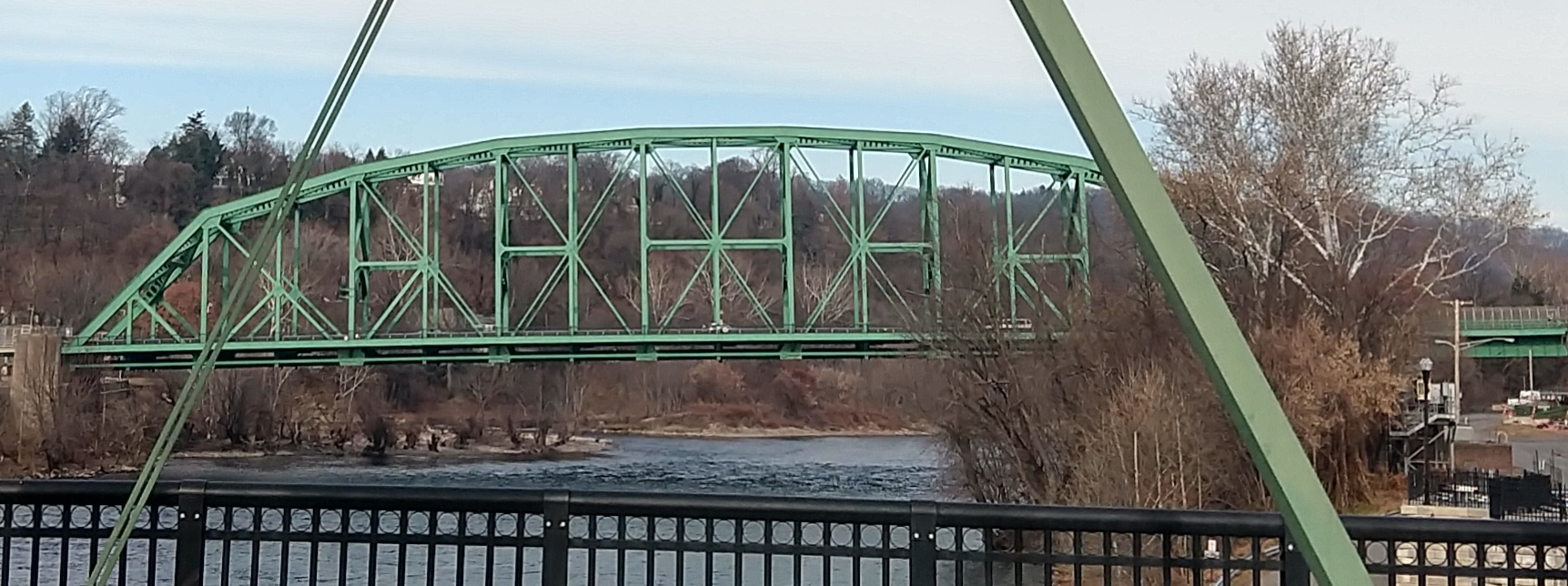
Easton–Phillipsburg Toll Bridge crosses the Delaware, connecting Easton, Pennsylvania and Phillipsburg, New Jersey, in the Lehigh Valley.

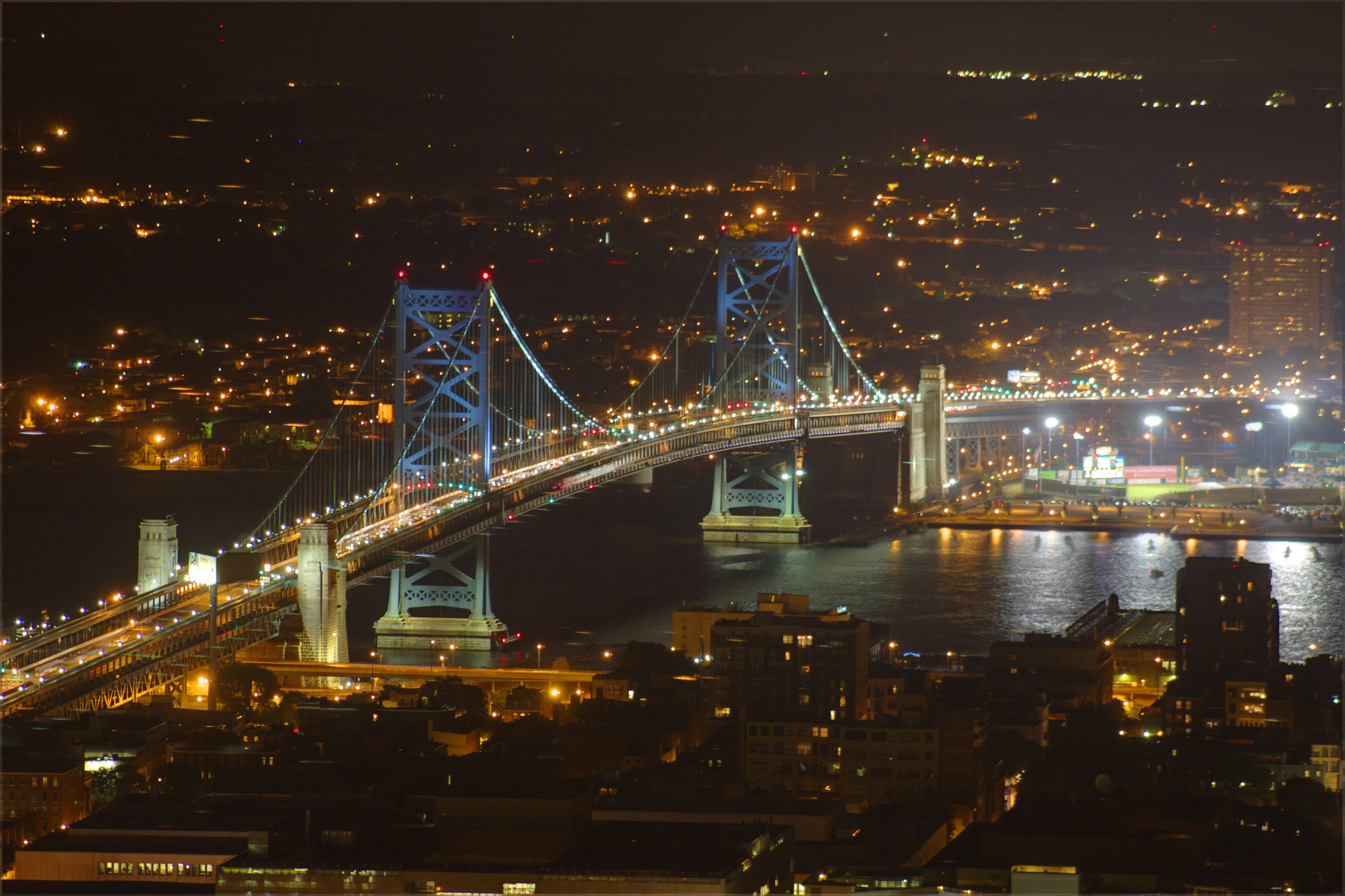
Benjamin Franklin Bridge crosses the Delaware, connecting Philadelphia and Camden, New Jersey.

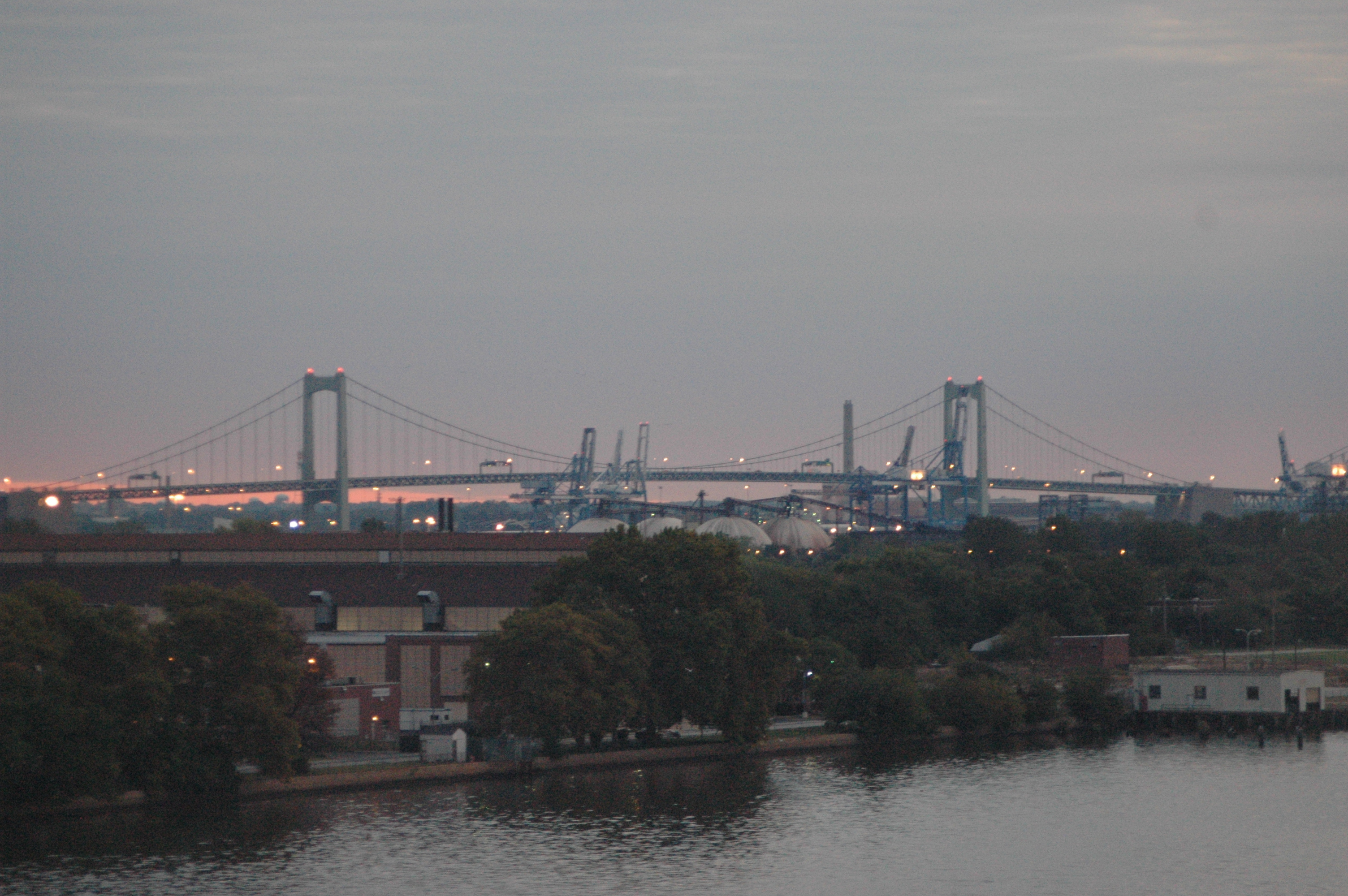
Walt Whitman Bridge crosses the Delaware, connecting Philadelphia and Gloucester City, New Jersey.

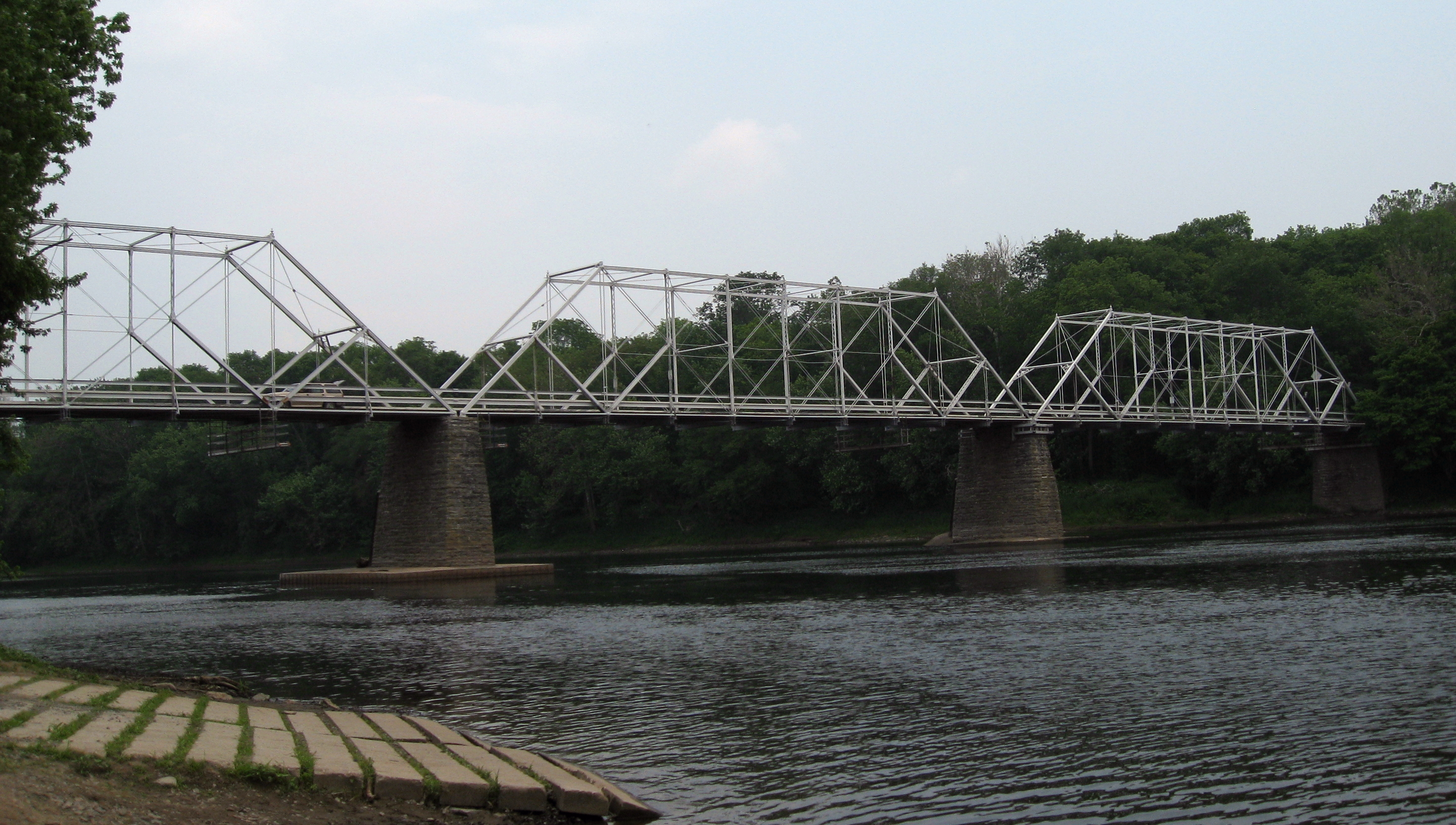
Dingman's Ferry Bridge connects Sandyston Township, New Jersey, and Delaware Township in Pike County, Pennsylvania

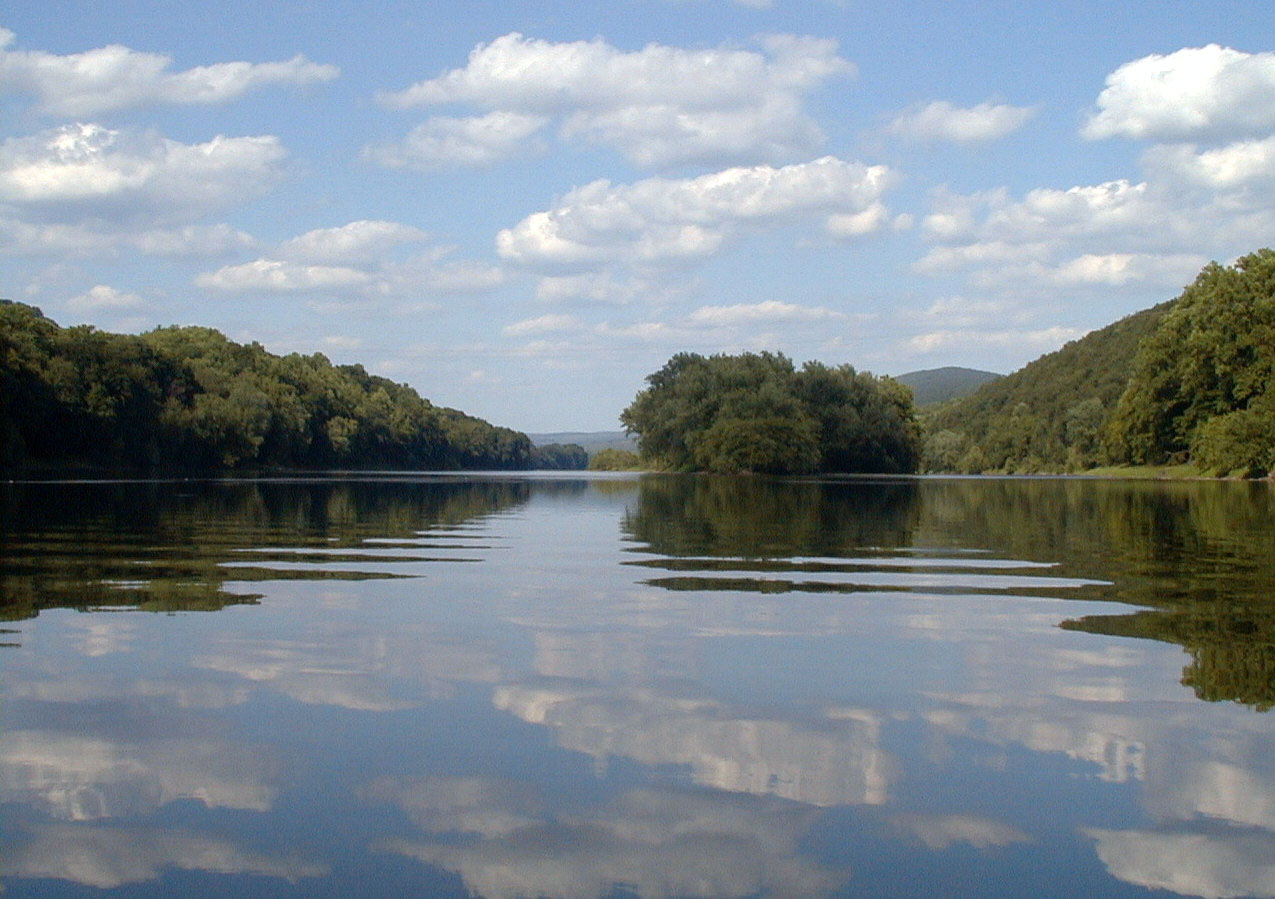
The Delaware within the southern portion of the Delaware Water Gap National Recreation Area, near Worthington State Forest in New Jersey

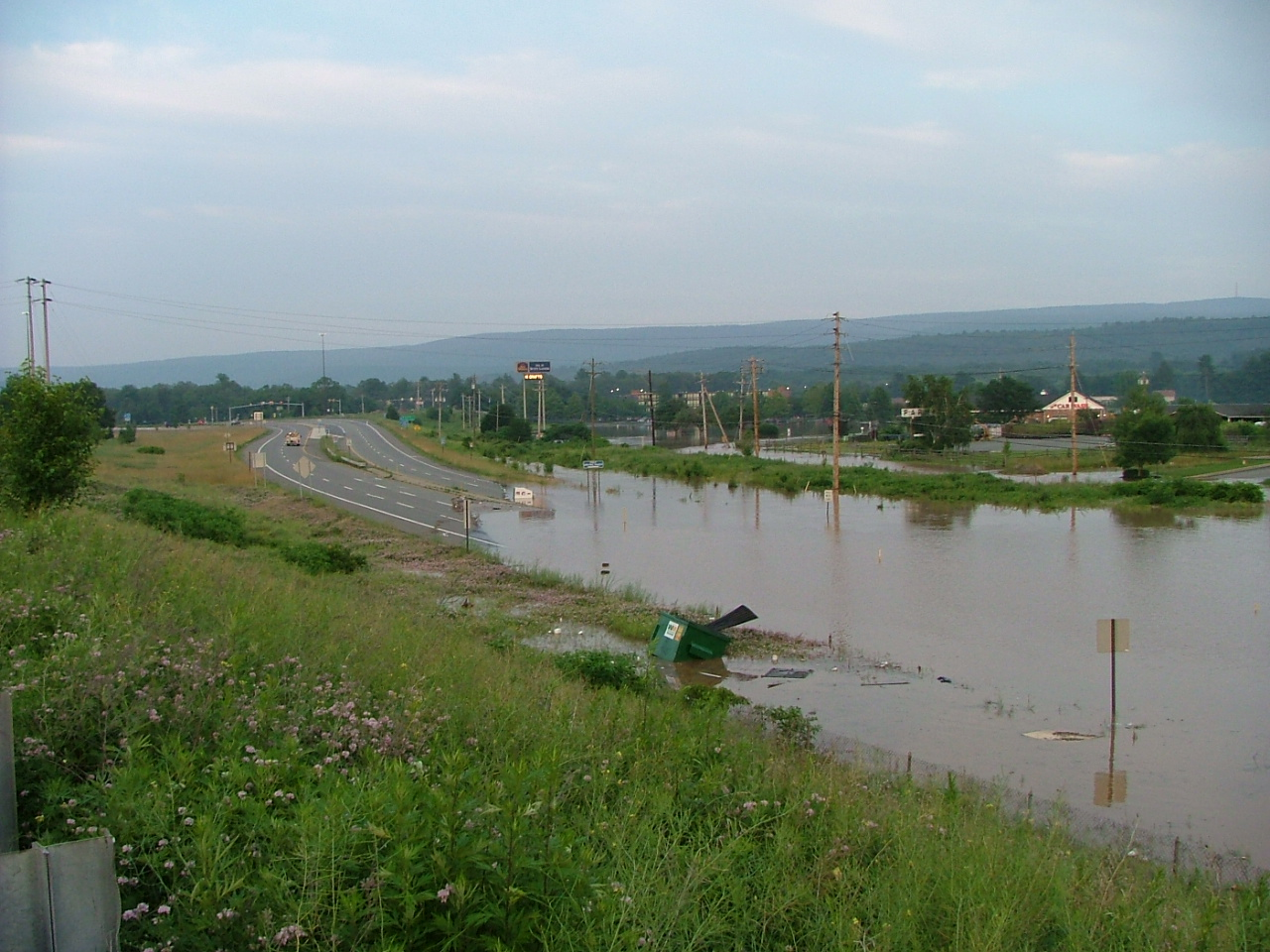
A flood in Westfall, Pennsylvania, in 2006

== Course ==
=== West Branch of the Delaware ===
The West Branch of the Delaware River, also called the Mohawk Branch, spans approximately 90 miles (140 km) from the northern Catskill Mountains to its confluence with the Delaware River's East Branch at Hancock, New York. The last 6 miles (9.7 km) forms part of the boundary between New York and Pennsylvania.

The West Branch rises in Schoharie County, New York at 1,886 feet (575 m) above sea level, near Mount Jefferson, and flows tortuously through the plateau in a deep trough. The branch flows generally southwest, entering Delaware County and flowing through the towns of Stamford and Delhi. In southwestern Delaware County it flows in an increasingly winding course through the mountains, generally southwest. At Stilesville the West Branch was impounded in the 1960s to form the Cannonsville Reservoir, the westernmost of the reservoirs in the New York City water system. It is the most recently constructed New York City reservoir and began serving the city in 1964. Draining a large watershed of 455 square miles (1,180 km^{2}), the reservoir's capacity is 95.7 billion US gallons (362,000,000 m^{3}). This water flows over halfway through the reservoir to enter the 44-mile (71 km) West Delaware Tunnel in Tompkins, New York. Then it flows through the aqueduct into the Rondout Reservoir, where the water enters the 85 miles (137 km) Delaware Aqueduct, that contributes to roughly 50% of the city's drinking water supply. At Deposit, on the border between Broome and Delaware counties, it turns sharply to the southeast and is paralleled by New York State Route 17. It joins the East Branch at 880 feet (270 m) above sea level at Hancock to form the Delaware.

=== East Branch of the Delaware ===
Similarly, the East Branch begins from a small pond south of Grand Gorge in the town of Roxbury in Delaware County, flowing southwest toward its impoundment by New York City to create the Pepacton Reservoir, the largest reservoir in the New York City water supply system. Its tributaries are the Beaver Kill River and the Willowemoc Creek which enter into the river ten miles (16 km) before the West Branch meets the East Branch. The confluence of the two branches is just south of Hancock.

The East Branch and West Branch of the Delaware River parallel each other, both flowing in a southwesterly direction.

=== Upper Delaware Valley ===
From Hancock, New York, the Delaware flows between the northern Poconos in Pennsylvania, and the lowered shale beds north of the Catskills. The river flows down a broad Appalachian valley, passing Hawk's Nest overlook on the Upper Delaware Scenic Byway. The river flows southeast for 78 miles through rural regions along the New York-Pennsylvania border to Port Jervis and Shawangunk Ridge.

=== The Minisink ===
At Port Jervis, New York, it enters the Port Jervis trough. At this point, the Walpack Ridge deflects the Delaware into the Minisink Valley, where it follows the southwest strike of the eroded Marcellus Formation beds along the Pennsylvania–New Jersey state line for 25 miles (40 km) to the end of the ridge at Walpack Bend in the Delaware Water Gap National Recreation Area. The Minisink is a buried valley where the Delaware flows in a bed of glacial till that buried the eroded bedrock during the last glacial period. It then skirts the Kittatinny ridge, which it crosses at the Delaware Water Gap, between nearly vertical walls of sandstone, quartzite, and conglomerate, and then passes through a quiet and charming country of farm and forest, diversified with plateaus and escarpments, until it crosses the Appalachian plain and enters the hills again at Easton, Pennsylvania. From this point it is flanked at intervals by fine hills, and in places by cliffs, of which the finest are the Nockamixon Cliffs, 3 miles (5 km) long and above 200 feet (61 m) high.

The Appalachian Trail, which traverses the ridge of Kittatinny Mountain in New Jersey, and Blue Mountain in Pennsylvania, crosses the Delaware River at the Delaware Water Gap near Columbia, New Jersey.

=== Central Delaware Valley ===
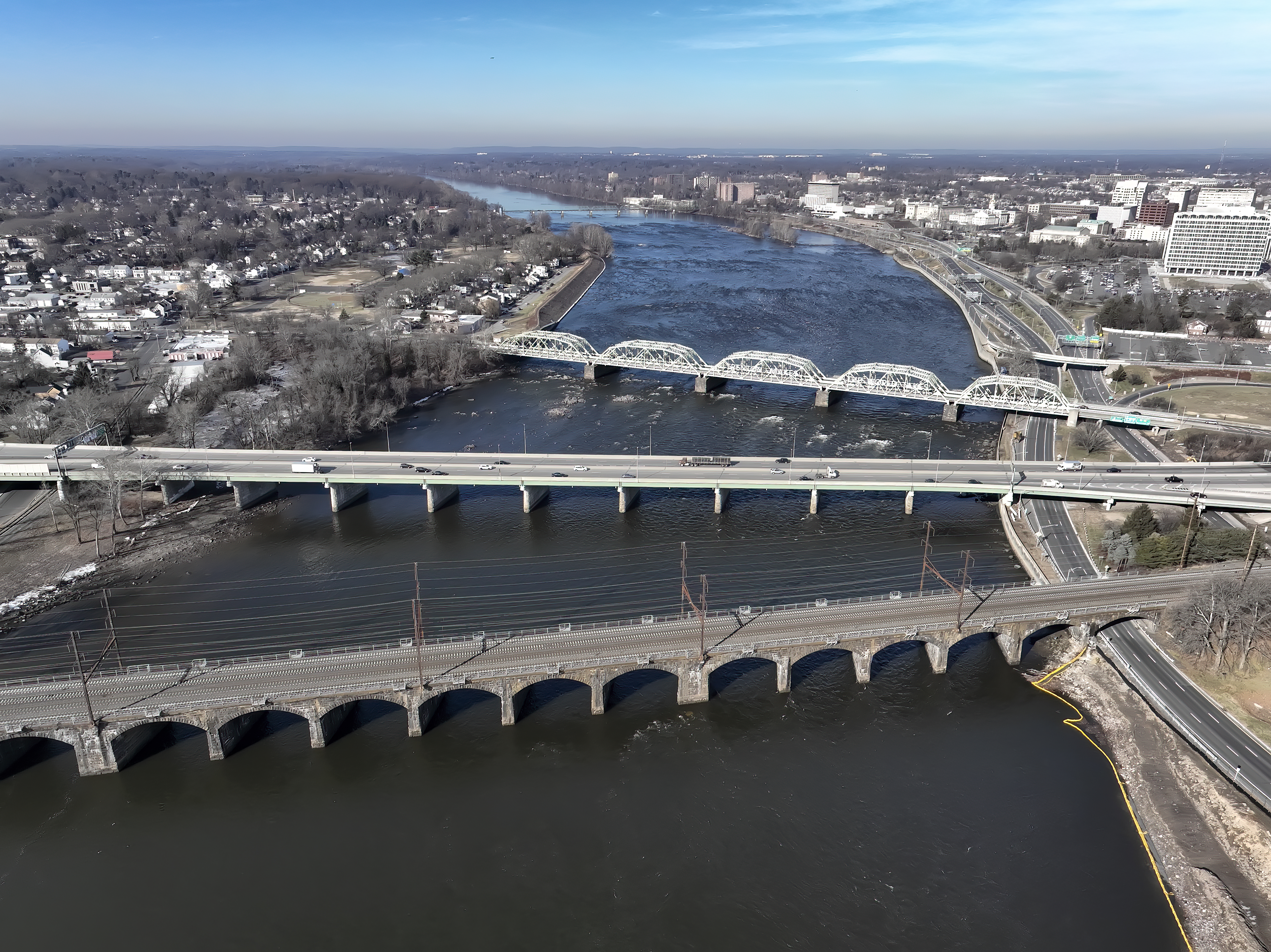
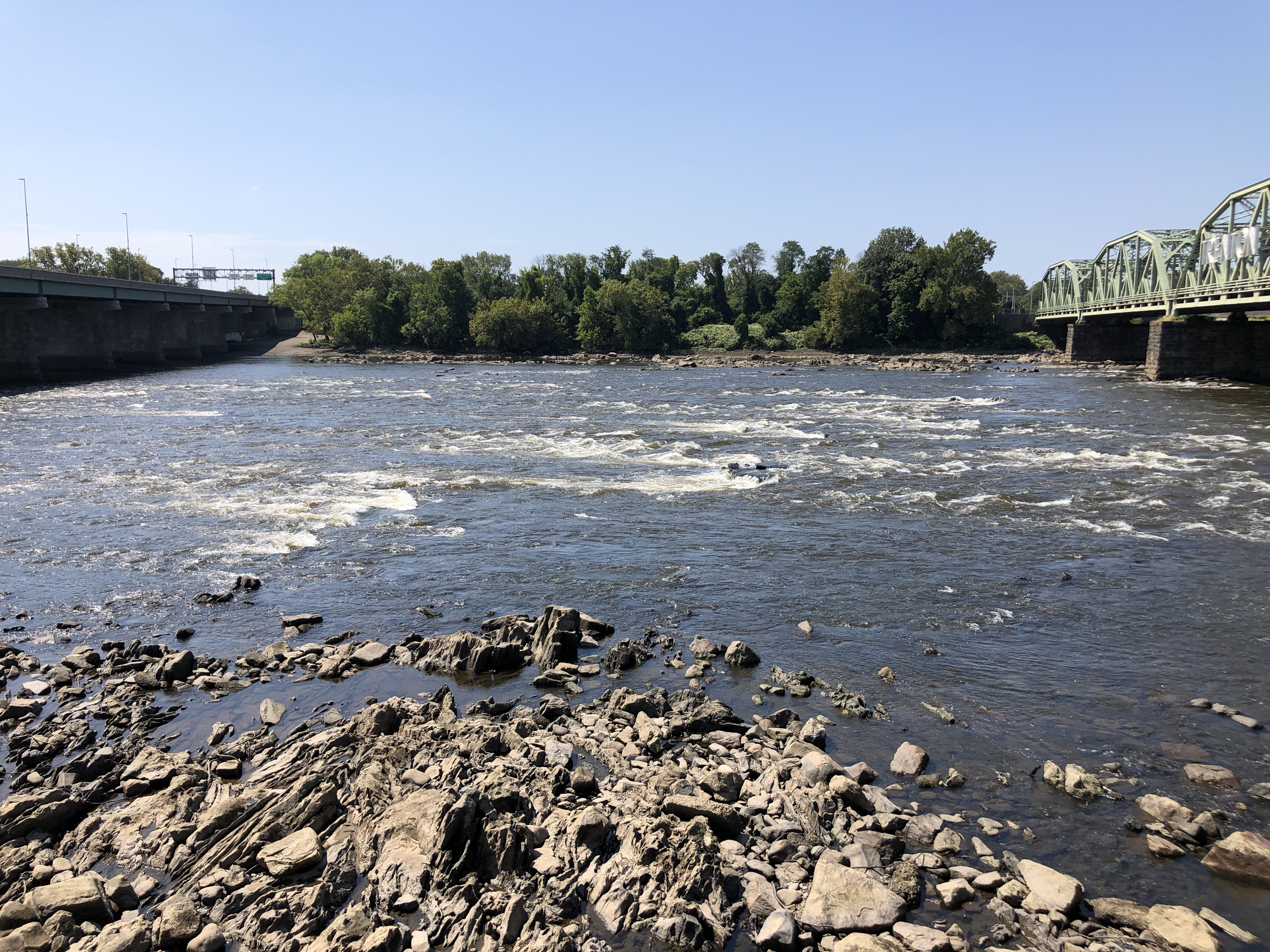
The Falls of the Delaware at Trenton, where the river becomes tidal. Left - aerial view looking northwest; right - ground view from the New Jersey banks

In Easton, Pennsylvania, the Lehigh River joins the Delaware. At Trenton, the Delaware crosses the Atlantic Seaboard Fall Line with a drop of 8 feet (2.4 m).

=== Lower Delaware and Tidewater ===
Below Trenton, the Delaware flows between Philadelphia and New Jersey as it transitions into a broad, sluggish inlet of the sea, with many marshes along its side, widening steadily into its great estuary, Delaware Bay.

The Delaware River constitutes the boundary between Delaware and New Jersey. The Delaware–New Jersey border is actually at the easternmost river shoreline within the Twelve-Mile Circle of New Castle, rather than at mid-river, mid-channel or thalweg, so small portions of land lying west of the shoreline, but on the New Jersey side of the river, are pene-exclaves under the jurisdiction of Delaware. The rest of the borders follow a mid-channel approach.

== History ==
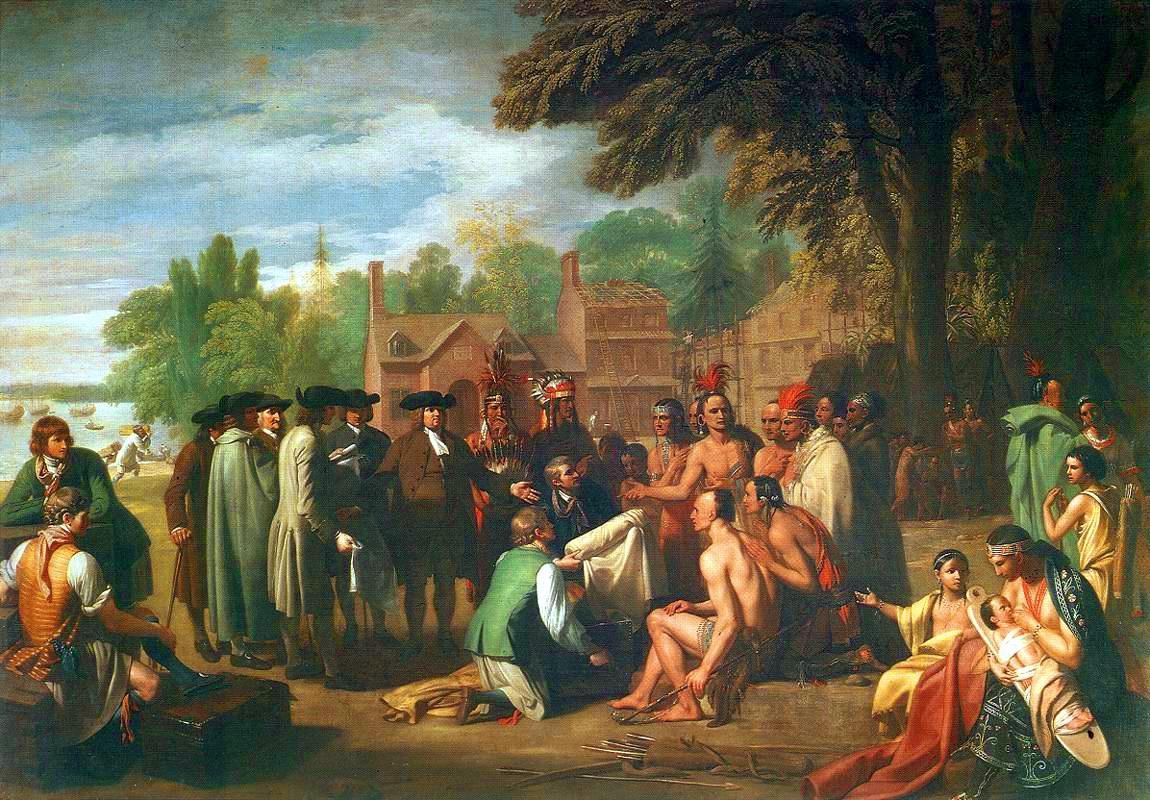
Benjamin West's painting, The Treaty of Penn with the Indians (1771–1772), depicts the 1683 Treaty of Shackamaxon between William Penn and Tamanend, the chief of the Lenape's Turtle Clan. Voltaire referred to it as "the only treaty never sworn to and never broken."

At the time of the arrival of the Europeans in the early 17th century, the area near the Delaware River was inhabited by the Native American Lenape people, who called the Delaware River Lënapei Sipu, meaning "Lenape river", or Lenape Wihittuck, which means "the rapid stream of the Lenape". The Delaware River played a key factor in the economic and social development of the Mid-Atlantic region.

In the 17th century, the river provided the conduit for colonial settlement by the Dutch (New Netherland) and the Swedish (New Sweden). Beginning in 1664, the region became an English possession as settlement by Quakers established the colonies of Pennsylvania (including present-day Delaware) and West Jersey. In the eighteenth century, cities like Philadelphia, Camden (then Cooper's Ferry), Trenton, Wilmington and New Castle were established upon the Delaware and their continued commercial success into the present day has been dependent on access to the river for trade and power. The river provided the path for the settlement of northeastern Pennsylvania's Lehigh Valley, and northwestern New Jersey by German Palatine immigrants—a population that became key in the agricultural development of the region.

=== Swedish Colonization (1638–1655) ===
In 1638, Swedish settlers, led by Peter Menuet, established New Sweden along the Delaware River. This settlement marked one of the earliest European establishments in the region, with Fort Christina (located near modern-day Wilmington, Delaware) becoming a key trading post and symbol of Swedish colonial ambition. The Swedes engaged in peaceful land negotiations with the local Lenape people and developed a thriving colony. New Sweden became a center for trade and cultural exchange between the Swedish settlers, Native Americans, and neighboring Dutch colonies. Although the Dutch would later assert dominance over the region in 1655, New Sweden laid the groundwork for European settlement along the Delaware River. The fort and surrounding settlements played a crucial role in the early European rivalry for control of North America's resources and territory. This era of Swedish colonization is an important part of the Delaware River's history, adding to its diverse cultural legacy.

=== American Revolutionary War ===
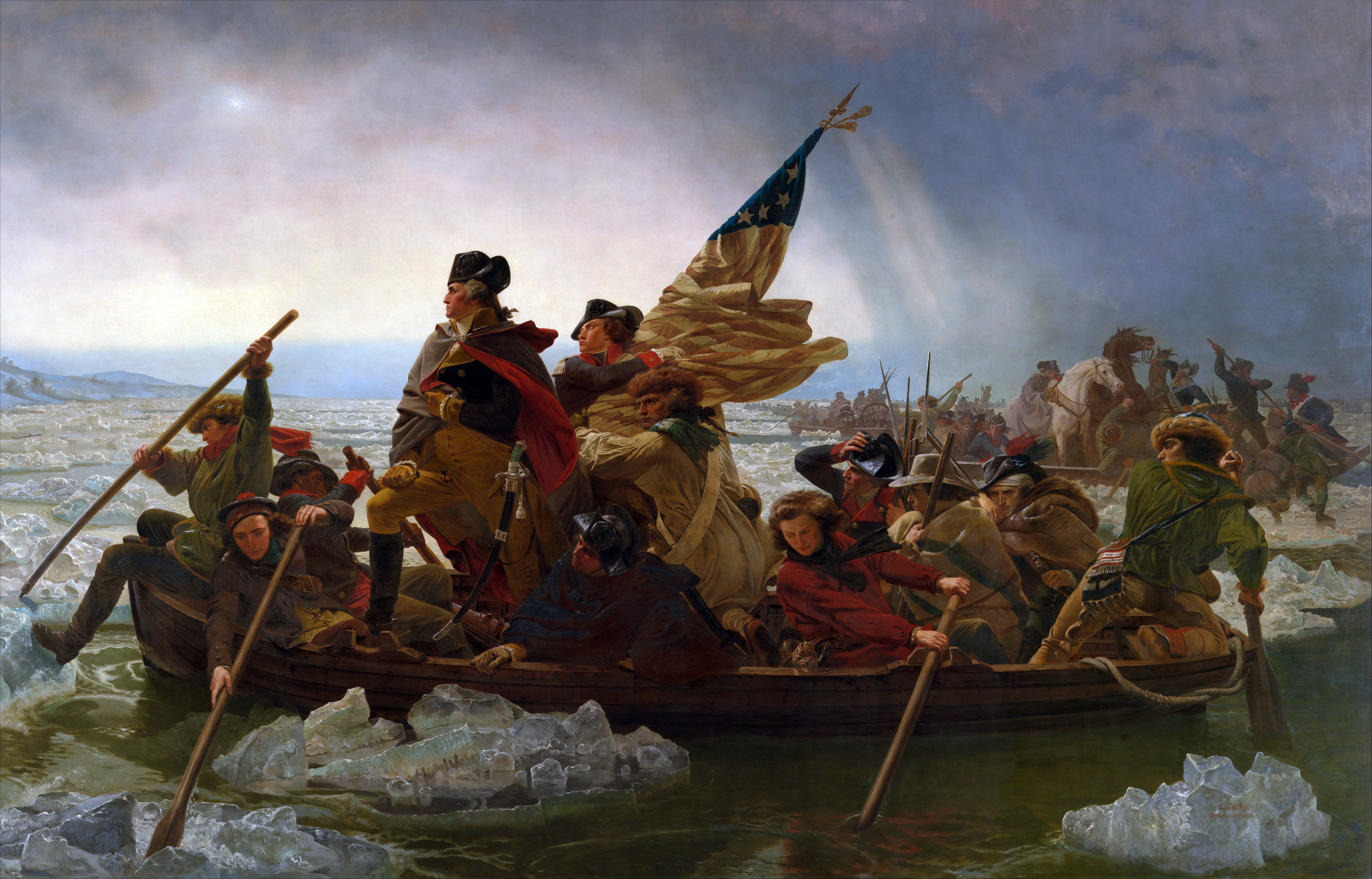
Washington Crossing the Delaware by Emanuel Leutze, 1851, now displayed at the Metropolitan Museum of Art in New York City

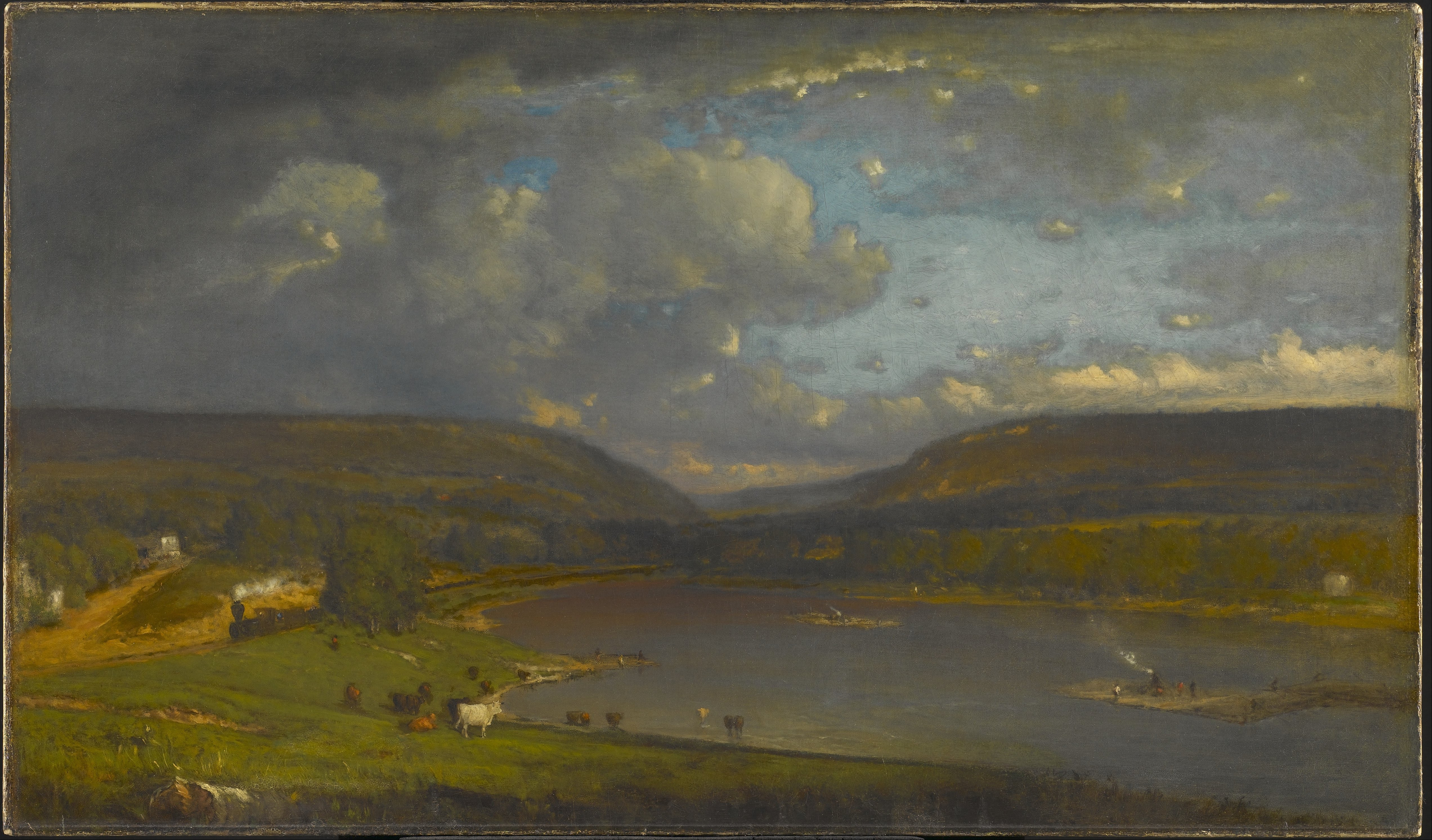
On the Delaware River, an oil painting (c. 1861–1863) by George Inness now on display at Brooklyn Museum

The strategic Delaware River was the scene of several important campaigns during the American Revolutionary War. Perhaps the most famous event was George Washington's crossing of the Delaware River with the Continental Army on the night of December 25–26, 1776, leading to a successful surprise attack and victory against the Hessian troops occupying Trenton, New Jersey, on the morning of December 26.

During the Philadelphia Campaign control of the Delaware River was urgently needed by the British, allowing their naval fleet to supply troops occupying Philadelphia. To this end, the Battle of Red Bank and the Siege of Fort Mifflin were fought on and along the shores of the Delaware by the American and British navies, commanded by Commodore John Hazelwood and Admiral Francis Reynolds respectively. See historical map of that campaign.

=== Canals ===
The magnitude of the commerce of Philadelphia has made the improvements of the river below that port of great importance. Small improvements were attempted by Pennsylvania as early as 1771. Commerce was once important on the upper river, primarily prior to railway competition of 1857.

- The Delaware Division of the Pennsylvania Canal, running parallel with the river from Easton to Bristol, opened in 1830.
- The Delaware and Raritan Canal, which runs along the New Jersey side of the Delaware River from Bulls Island, New Jersey to Trenton, unites the waters of the Delaware and Raritan rivers as it empties the waters of the Delaware River via the canal outlet in New Brunswick. This canal water conduit is still used as a water supply source by the State of New Jersey.
- The Morris Canal (now abandoned and almost completely filled in) and the Delaware and Hudson Canal connected the Delaware and Hudson rivers.
- The Chesapeake and Delaware Canal joins the waters of the Delaware with those of the Chesapeake Bay.

=== Delaware Water Gap National Recreation Area ===
The Delaware Water Gap National Recreation Area came about as a result of the failure of a controversial plan to build a dam on the Delaware River at Tocks Island, just north of the Delaware Water Gap to control water levels for flood control and hydroelectric power generation. The dam would have created a 37-mile (60 km) lake in the center of present park for use as a reservoir. Starting in 1960, the present-day area of the Recreation Area was acquired for the Army Corps of Engineers through eminent domain. Between 3,000 and 5,000 dwellings were demolished, including historical sites, and about 15,000 people were displaced by the project.

Because of massive environmental opposition, dwindling funds, and an unacceptable geological assessment of the dam's safety, the government transferred the property to the National Park Service in 1978. The National Park Service found itself as the caretaker of the previously endangered territory, and with the help of the federal government and surrounding communities, developed recreational facilities and worked to preserve the remaining historical structures.

The nearby Shawnee Inn, was identified in the 1990s as the only resort along the banks of the Delaware River.

American Rivers, an environmental advocacy group, named the Delaware River as the River of the Year for 2020, citing 75 years of progress in reducing pollution and restoring wildlife.

== Commerce ==
=== Wine regions ===
In 1984, the U.S. Department of the Treasury authorized the creation of a wine region or "American Viticultural Area" called the Central Delaware Valley AVA located in southeastern Pennsylvania and New Jersey. The wine appellation includes 96,000 acres (38,850 ha) surrounding the Delaware River north of Philadelphia and Trenton, New Jersey. In Pennsylvania, it consists of the territory along the Delaware River in Bucks County; in New Jersey, the AVA spans along the river in Hunterdon County and Mercer County from Titusville, New Jersey, just north of Trenton, northward to Musconetcong Mountain. As of 2013, there are no New Jersey wineries in the Central Delaware Valley AVA.

=== Shipping ===
In the Project of 1885, the U.S. government systematically undertook the formation of a 26-foot (7.9 m) deep federal navigation shipping channel 600 feet (180 m) wide from Philadelphia to Delaware Bay. The River and Harbor Act of 1899 provided for a 30-foot (9.1 m) channel 600 feet (180 m) wide from Philadelphia to the deep water of the bay.

Since 1941, the Delaware River Main Channel was maintained at a depth of 40 ft (12 m). Since 2013 there has been a push to deepen the 102.5-mile stretch from Philadelphia and Camden to the mouth of the Delaware Bay to 45 feet.

The Delaware River port complex refers to the ports and energy facilities along the river in the tri-state PA–NJ–DE Delaware Valley region. They include the Port of Salem, the Port of Wilmington, the Port of Chester, the Port of Paulsboro, the Port of Philadelphia and the Port of Camden. Combined they create one of the largest shipping areas of the United States. In 2015, the ports of Philadelphia, Camden, and Wilmington handled 100 million tons of cargo from 2,243 ship arrivals, and supported 135,000 direct or indirect jobs. The biggest category of imports was fruit, carried by 490 ships, followed by petroleum, and containers, with 410 and 381 ships, respectively. The biggest category of exports was of shipping was containers, with 470 ships. In 2016, 2,427 ships arrived at Delaware River port facilities. Fruit ships were counted at 577, petroleum at 474, and containerized cargo at 431.

At one time it was a center for petroleum and chemical products and included facilities such as the Delaware City Refinery, the Dupont Chambers Works, Oceanport Terminal at Claymont, the Marcus Hook Refinery, the Trainer Refinery, the Paulsboro Asphalt Refinery, Paulsboro Refinery, Eagle Point Refinery, and Sunoco Fort Mifflin. As of 2011, crude oil was the largest single commodity transported on the Delaware River, accounting for half of all annual cargo tonnage.

=== Crossings ===
The Delaware River is a major barrier to travel between New Jersey and Pennsylvania. Most of the larger bridges are tolled only westbound, and are owned by the Delaware River and Bay Authority, Delaware River Port Authority, Burlington County Bridge Commission or Delaware River Joint Toll Bridge Commission.

== Environmental issues ==
=== New York City water supply ===
After New York City built 15 reservoirs to supply water to the city's growing population, it was unable to obtain permission to build an additional five reservoirs along the Delaware River's tributaries. As a result, in 1928 the city proposed to draw water from the Delaware River, putting them in direct conflict with villages and towns across the river in Pennsylvania which were already using the Delaware for their water supply. Additionally, the Government of New Jersey raised concerns that New York's water diversions might hinder New Jersey's future development of dams and hydropower; that the water quality of the river would be impacted, due to reduced flows of fresh water; and that its riparian rights would be diminished. New Jersey filed suit against New York State and New York City, with the Government of Pennsylvania intervening in the case to protect its interests. In 1931 the U.S. Supreme Court decided that New York could draw water from the Delaware tributaries, subject to the laws of Congress and regulation by the US Army Corps of Engineers. New York City was allowed to draw 440 million US gallons (1,700,000 m^{3}) of water a day from the Delaware and its upstream tributaries, going on to build three large reservoirs and the Delaware Aqueduct they feed.

=== Pollution ===
The Delaware River has been attached to areas of high pollution. The Delaware River in 2012 was named the 5th most polluted river in the United States, explained by PennEnvironment and Environment New Jersey. The activist groups claim that there is about 7–10 million pounds of toxic chemicals flowing through the waterways due to dumping by DuPont Chambers Works. PennEnvironment also claims that the pollutants in the river can cause birth defects, infertility among women, and have been linked to cancer.

In 2015, the EPA saw the Delaware River as a concern for mass pollution especially in the Greater Philadelphia and Chester, Pennsylvania area. The EPA was involved after accusations that the river met standards made illegal by the Clean Water Act. In complying with the Clean Water Act, the EPA involved the Delaware County Regional Water Authority (DELCORA) where they set up a plan to spend around $200 million to help rid the waterway of about 740 million gallons of sewage and pollution. DELCORA was also fined about $1.4 million for allowing the Delaware River to have so much pollution residing in the river in the first place and for not complying with the Clean Water Act.

Part of the Clean Water Act explains how conditions of the river should be stable enough for human fishing and swimming. Even though the river has had success with the cleanup of pollution, the Delaware River still does not meet that standard of swimmable or fishable conditions in the Philadelphia/Chester region.

In March 2023, a pipe rupture at a Trinseo chemical plant in Bristol, Pennsylvania, released over 8,000 gallons of latex finishing material into the Otter Creek tributary, leading to a water advisory in Philadelphia.

=== Flooding ===
With the failure of the dam project to come to fruition, the lack of flood control on the river left it vulnerable, and it has experienced a number of serious flooding events as the result of snow melt or rain run-off from heavy rainstorms. Record flooding occurred in August 1955, in the aftermath of the passing of the remnants of two separate hurricanes over the area within less than a week: first Hurricane Connie and then Hurricane Diane, which was, and still is, the wettest tropical cyclone to have hit the northeastern United States. The river gauge at Riegelsville, Pennsylvania recorded an all-time record crest of 38.85 feet (11.84 m) on August 19, 1955.

More recently, moderate to severe flooding has occurred along the river. The same gauge at Riegelsville recorded a peak of 30.95 feet (9.43 m) on September 23, 2004, 34.07 feet (10.38 m) on April 4, 2005, and 33.62 feet (10.25 m) on June 28, 2006, all considerably higher than the flood stage of 22 feet (6.7 m).

Since the upper Delaware basin has few population centers along its banks, flooding in this area mainly affects natural unpopulated flood plains. Residents in the middle part of the Delaware basin experience flooding, including three major floods in the three years (2004–2006) that have severely damaged their homes and land. The lower part of the Delaware basin from Philadelphia southward to the Delaware Bay is tidal and much wider than portions further north, and is not prone to river-related flooding (although tidal surges can cause minor flooding in this area).

The Delaware River Basin Commission, along with local governments, is working to try to address the issue of flooding along the river. As the past few years have seen a rise in catastrophic floods, most residents of the river basin feel that something must be done. The local governments have worked in association with FEMA to address many of these problems, however, due to insufficient federal funds, progress is slow.

=== Oil spills ===
A number of oil spills have taken place in the Delaware over the years.

- January 31, 1975: around 11,172,000 US gallons (42,290 m^{3}) of crude oil spilled from the Corinthos tanker
- September 28, 1985: 435,000 US gallons (1,650 m^{3}) of crude oil spilled from the Grand Eagle tanker after running aground on Marcus Hook Bar
- June 24, 1989: 306,000 US gallons (1,160 m^{3}) of crude oil spilled from the Presidente Rivera tanker after running aground on Claymont Shoal
- November 26, 2004: 265,000 US gallons (1,000 m^{3}) of crude oil spilled from the Athos 1 tanker; the tanker's hull had been punctured by a submerged, discarded anchor at the Port of Paulsboro. In 2020, the Supreme Court ruled that Citgo had failed to provide a safe berth for the vessel and was therefore jointly responsible for clean up costs. The company was ordered to pay $143 million.

=== Atlantic sturgeon ===
The National Marine Fisheries Service is considering designating sixteen rivers as endangered habitat for the Atlantic sturgeon which would require more attention to be given to uses of the rivers that affect the fish.

=== National Wild and Scenic River ===
The river is part of the National Wild and Scenic Rivers System.

== See also ==
- Delaware Riverkeeper Network
- Geography of Pennsylvania
- List of municipalities on the Delaware River
- List of crossings of the Delaware River
- List of rivers of Delaware
- List of rivers of New Jersey
- List of rivers of New York
- List of rivers of Pennsylvania
- List of most-polluted rivers
- Partnership for the Delaware Estuary
- Upper Delaware Scenic and Recreational River

== General and cited references ==
- Brooks, Victor (1999). How America Fought Its Wars. New York: Da Capo Press. ISBN 1-58097-002-8.
- Devastation on the Delaware: Stories and Images of the Deadly Flood of 1955 (2005, Word Forge Books, Ferndale, PA) The only comprehensive documentary of this weather disaster in the Delaware River Valley.
- Leach, Josiah Granville (1902). "Commodore John Hazlewood, Commander of the Pennsylvania Navy in the Revolution". The Pennsylvania Magazine of History and Biography. 26 (1). The Historical Society of Pennsylvania: 1–6. JSTOR 20086007.
- McGeorge, Wallace (1905). The Battle of Red Bank, Resulting in the Defeat of the Hessians and the Destruction of the British Frigate Augusta, Oct. 22 and 23, 1777. Camden, New Jersey: Sinnickson Chew, Printers.
- Savas, Theodore (2006). Guide to the Battles of the American Revolution. Savas Beatie. ISBN 1-932714-12-X.
