= List of municipalities on the Delaware River =

This is a list of municipalities on the Delaware River and Delaware Bay from the confluence of the East Branch Delaware River and West Branch Delaware River downstream to the Atlantic Ocean. Since the river forms a state border for the entirety of its length (with the exception of Finns Point and Artificial Island), its left and right banks have distinct sets of municipalities. Unincorporated areas are not listed.

City Borough or town Village Township or New York town

Right bank
Municipality	County	State
Buckingham Township	Wayne County	PA
Manchester Township	Wayne County	PA
Damascus Township	Wayne County	PA
Berlin Township	Wayne County	PA
Shohola Township	Pike County	PA
Westfall Township	Pike County	PA
Matamoras	Pike County	PA
Westfall Township	Pike County	PA
Milford Township	Pike County	PA
Milford	Pike County	PA
Dingman Township	Pike County	PA
Delaware Township	Pike County	PA
Lehman Township	Pike County	PA
Middle Smithfield Township	Monroe County	PA
Smithfield Township	Monroe County	PA
Delaware Water Gap	Monroe County	PA
Upper Mount Bethel Township	Northampton County	PA
Portland	Northampton County	PA
Upper Mount Bethel Township	Northampton County	PA
Lower Mount Bethel Township	Northampton County	PA
Forks Township	Northampton County	PA
Easton	Northampton County	PA
Williams Township	Northampton County	PA
Riegelsville	Bucks County	PA
Durham Township	Bucks County	PA
Nockamixon Township	Bucks County	PA
Bridgeton Township	Bucks County	PA
Tinicum Township	Bucks County	PA
Plumstead Township	Bucks County	PA
Solebury Township	Bucks County	PA
New Hope	Bucks County	PA
Solebury Township	Bucks County	PA
Upper Makefield Township	Bucks County	PA
Lower Makefield Township	Bucks County	PA
Yardley	Bucks County	PA
Lower Makefield Township	Bucks County	PA
Morrisville	Bucks County	PA
Falls Township	Bucks County	PA
Tullytown	Bucks County	PA
Bristol Township	Bucks County	PA
Bristol	Bucks County	PA
Bristol Township	Bucks County	PA
Bensalem Township	Bucks County	PA
Philadelphia	Philadelphia County	PA
Tinicum Township	Delaware County	PA
Ridley Township	Delaware County	PA
Eddystone	Delaware County	PA
Chester	Delaware County	PA
Trainer	Delaware County	PA
Marcus Hook	Delaware County	PA
Wilmington	New Castle County	DE
New Castle	New Castle County	DE
Delaware City	New Castle County	DE
No incorporated areas	Kent County	DE
Slaughter Beach	Sussex County	DE
Lewes	Sussex County	DE

Left bank
Municipality	County	State
Village of Hancock	Delaware County	NY
Town of Hancock	Delaware County	NY
Town of Fremont	Sullivan County	NY
Town of Delaware	Sullivan County	NY
Town of Cochecton	Sullivan County	NY
Town of Tusten	Sullivan County	NY
Town of Highland	Sullivan County	NY
Town of Lumberland	Sullivan County	NY
Town of Deerpark	Orange County	NY
Port Jervis	Orange County	NY
Montague Township	Sussex County	NJ
Sandyston Township	Sussex County	NJ
Walpack Township	Sussex County	NJ
Hardwick Township	Warren County	NJ
Knowlton Township	Warren County	NJ
White Township	Warren County	NJ
Belvidere	Warren County	NJ
White Township	Warren County	NJ
Lopatcong Township	Warren County	NJ
Phillipsburg	Warren County	NJ
Pohatcong Township	Warren County	NJ
Holland Township	Hunterdon County	NJ
Milford	Hunterdon County	NJ
Alexandria Township	Hunterdon County	NJ
Frenchtown	Hunterdon County	NJ
Kingwood Township	Hunterdon County	NJ
Delaware Township	Hunterdon County	NJ
Stockton	Hunterdon County	NJ
Delaware Township	Hunterdon County	NJ
Lambertville	Hunterdon County	NJ
West Amwell Township	Hunterdon County	NJ
Hopewell Township	Mercer County	NJ
Ewing Township	Mercer County	NJ
Trenton	Mercer County	NJ
Hamilton Township	Mercer County	NJ
Bordentown Township	Burlington County	NJ
Fieldsboro	Burlington County	NJ
Bordentown Township	Burlington County	NJ
Mansfield Township	Burlington County	NJ
Florence Township	Burlington County	NJ
Burlington Township	Burlington County	NJ
Burlington	Burlington County	NJ
Burlington Township	Burlington County	NJ
Edgewater Park Township	Burlington County	NJ
Beverly	Burlington County	NJ
Delanco Township	Burlington County	NJ
Delran Township	Burlington County	NJ
Cinnaminson Township	Burlington County	NJ
Riverton	Burlington County	NJ
Palmyra	Burlington County	NJ
Pennsauken Township	Camden County	NJ
Camden	Camden County	NJ
Gloucester City	Camden County	NJ
Westville	Gloucester County	NJ
West Deptford Township	Gloucester County	NJ
National Park	Gloucester County	NJ
West Deptford Township	Gloucester County	NJ
Paulsboro	Gloucester County	NJ
Greenwich Township	Gloucester County	NJ
Logan Township	Gloucester County	NJ
Oldmans Township	Salem County	NJ
Carneys Point Township	Salem County	NJ
Penns Grove	Salem County	NJ
Carneys Point Township	Salem County	NJ
Pennsville Township	Salem County	NJ
Elsinboro Township	Salem County	NJ
Lower Alloways Creek Township	Salem County	NJ
Greenwich Township	Cumberland County	NJ
Fairfield Township	Cumberland County	NJ
Lawrence Township	Cumberland County	NJ
Downe Township	Cumberland County	NJ
Commercial Township	Cumberland County	NJ
Maurice River Township	Cumberland County	NJ
Dennis Township	Cape May County	NJ
Middle Township	Cape May County	NJ
Lower Township	Cape May County	NJ
Cape May Point	Cape May County	NJ
