= Mount Jefferson (Maine) =

Mountain in Penobscot County, Maine

- Location within Maine

Highest point
- Elevation: 755 ft (230 m)
- Coordinates: 45°21′08″N 68°16′58″W

Geography
- Location: Penobscot County, Maine, U.S.
- Topo map: USGS Lee

Climbing
- Easiest route: Hiking, class 1

Mount Jefferson is a mountain in Penobscot County in the U.S. state of Maine. It is 0.6 miles (1.0 km) south of Lee. The mountain is also known as Jefferson Mountain.
