= Mount Jefferson (Madison County, Montana) =

Mountain in the state of Montana

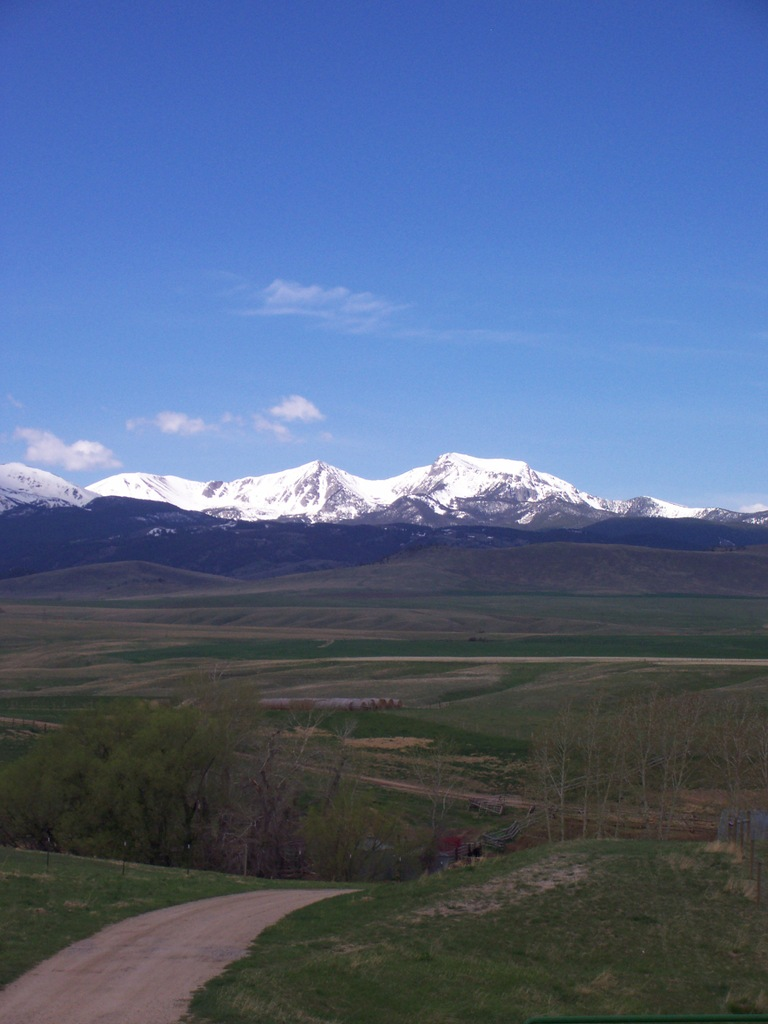
- Mt Jefferson and Hollowtop

Highest point
- Elevation: 10,513 ft (3,204 m)
- Prominence: 393 ft (120 m)
- Coordinates: 45°36′10″N 112°00′21″W

Geography
- Location within Montana
- Location: Madison County, Montana, U.S.
- Parent range: Tobacco Root
- Topo map(s): USGS Noble Peak, MT

Climbing
- Easiest route: Hike

Mount Jefferson is a mountain in the U.S. state of Montana, and is one of the many 10,000+ ft peaks in the Tobacco Root Mountains. The mountain is located in Beaverhead-Deerlodge National Forest. (There is also another Mount Jefferson in Montana, further south, on the Idaho/Montana border.) Hollowtop Mountain is an adjacent, taller peak less than .75 miles (1.2 km) to the north. Over the years, the two summits have had numerous names and elevations recorded on various maps. According to U.S. Geological Survey topographic maps, Mount Jefferson is 10,513 ft (3,204 m), while Hollowtop Mountain to the north is 10,604 ft (3,232 m).

== Nomenclature ==
The nomenclature for Mount Jefferson has seen considerable change and confusion over the years. A.N. Winchell, in his 1914 report, Mining Districts of the Dillon Quadrangle, referred to the highest peak in the Tobacco Roots as "Jefferson Peak, locally called Old Hollowtop." Since that time the more northerly, and higher, of the two adjacent peaks has usually been called Hollowtop. This naming convention is easily explained upon viewing the dish-shaped northeasterly-trending glacial cirque that occupies the top of Hollowtop peak. Information is scanty before 1914. Peale (1896) referred to Ward Peak, near Pony, and “unnamed high peaks” in the range. Present local terminology places Ward Peak further south, near McAlister. The idea that Lewis and Clark named the ranges along with the rivers cannot be confirmed.

Some earlier, published maps labeled the northern peak as Mt. Jefferson. Confusion may arise from the fact that the horizontal triangulation control station (VABM) named JEFFERSON is located on the southern peak, and this designation is found on many maps.

In 1933, Tansley and others referred to the high point of the range as Mt. Jefferson, at 10,600 ft. The northern peak was labeled Mt. Jefferson on the Gallatin National Forest map of 1937, with an erroneous (but long-perpetuated) elevation of 10,740’ given. The southern peak was called Hollow Top Mountain, at 10,513’. The next year, 1938, the Deerlodge National Forest map dodged the issue: the northern peak received two designations — Hollowtop Mtn. and Mt. Jefferson. The southern peak was labeled with the JEFFERSON control station only.

Reid in 1957 mapped the northern peak as Mt. Jefferson and the southern one as Goat Mountain. In 1960, the Waterloo 15-minute topographic quad showed Mt. Jefferson, to the north, at 10,604’, and the southern one as Hollowtop Mtn (10,513’) with the JEFFERSON control station label. In 1976, the U.S. Board on Geographic Names stated that this was the correct designation. The 1962 Dillon Quad (1:250,000) labeled the northern peak Hollow Top Mt., and the other one had no designation other than the triangular control station mark. The 1963 Beaverhead National Forest map shows Mt. Jefferson to the north at 10,604’ and the JEFFERSON control station to the south at 10,740’, while the 1970 Deerlodge National Forest map is similar, but with the name Hollowtop Mtn. and no elevation for the southern peak.

Oil Company highway maps from the late 1960s and early 1970s show Hollowtop Mtn. at 10,740’, while the Official Montana Highway Map, from at least 1971 onwards, has Hollow Top Mtn. at 10,604’. As recently as 1976, the Beaverhead National Forest map showed Mt. Jefferson to the north (10,604’) and Hollowtop Mtn. with the JEFFERSON control station to the south.

In 1987, the Interagency Visitors Map of Southwest Montana (produced by the Forest Service, USGS, and the State of Montana) shows the northern peak labeled Hollowtop Mtn. (10,604’), and the southern peak is marked Mt. Jefferson and includes the control station label. This is the first map known that shows both names, with Hollowtop north of Mt. Jefferson.

Finally, the 1989 7½-minute quad (Noble Peak) also shows Hollowtop Mountain (10,604’) to the north, with Mt. Jefferson (10,513’) to the south with the control station. Numerous hand-held GPS measurements indicate that these listed elevations are probably accurate.

Apparently no peak has an elevation of 10,740’, and all sources agree that the JEFFERSON triangulation station is on the southern peak. Decades of use would have “Hollowtop” to the north, and perhaps the newer maps reflect this usage. The northern peak is labeled “Hollowtop” and “Hollow Top” on various maps, with a single word somewhat more common.

== Geology ==
Most of the mountain is underlain by the Tobacco Root Batholith, a body of granite intruded about 75 million years ago during the Late Cretaceous Period. The Tobacco Root Batholith is often called a satellite of the much larger Boulder Batholith. Parts of Mt. Jefferson-Hollowtop contain Archean metamorphic rocks. Intrusion of the batholith produced considerable mineralization along northwest-trending faults. The Mammoth Mine, north of Mt. Jefferson-Hollowtop produced more than $2,000,000 in gold over its life (mostly in the 1880s-1910s). The Nicholson Gold Mine, on the west flank of Mt. Jefferson, has been active as recently as the middle 1990s, but no production has been reported. The area of the mine is private property, a patented mining claim.

The bowl-like crest of Hollowtop, best viewed from the towns of Pony, Montana and Harrison, Montana to the east, is not a classical glacial cirque. Snow and perhaps ice certainly accumulated there during the ice age, but scouring typical of a moving glacier is not evident.
