= Mount Jefferson (New York) =

Mountain in Schoharie County, New York

Highest point
- Elevation: 2,738 ft (835 m)
- Coordinates: 42°27′30″N 74°37′11″W

Geography
- Location: Jefferson, Schoharie County, New York, U.S.
- Parent range: Catskill Mountains
- Topo map: USGS Stamford

Climbing
- Easiest route: Hike

Mount Jefferson is a mountain located in Jefferson, Schoharie County of New York. Mount Jefferson is just northwest of the headwaters of the West Branch Delaware River. In addition to the Delaware, water on other sides of the mountain flows into both the Susquehanna River and the Hudson River.
