= 2008 Democratic Party presidential primaries =

Selection of the Democratic Party nominee

- January 3 to June 3, 2008

4,233 delegates to the Democratic National Convention 2,117 delegates needed to win

Candidate	Barack Obama	Hillary Clinton
Home state	Illinois	New York
Delegate count	2,272.5	1,978
Contests won	33	23
Popular vote	17,535,458 (Note: This figure does not include the states of Iowa, Nevada, Washington and Maine who did not release popular vote information. The political news and polling data aggregator website RealClearPolitics estimated that the results of the caucuses would have increased Obama's total vote to 17,869,542 and Clinton's to 17,717,698. The Democratic National Committee (DNC) did not recognize primary results in Michigan due to the state moving the date of their primary to January. Due to the lack of DNC recognition, Obama and several other candidates withdrew their names from the ballot whereas Clinton did not. The results of the Michigan primary were as thus: Uncommitted: 238,168; Clinton: 328,309. If the Michigan tally had been made official, the overall popular vote would be 17,535,458 for Obama and 17,822,145 for Clinton. With the caucuses estimates included, the overall tally would be 17,869,542 and 18,046,007, respectively.)	17,493,836
Percentage	48.1%	48.0%

First place by first-instance vote
Barack Obama (33)
Hillary Clinton (23)
Popular vote margins
Clinton
0–10%
10–20%
20–30%
30–85%
Obama
0–10%
10–20%
20–30%
30–85%
(popular vote winners and delegate winners differ in five contests: NH, NV, MO, TX, GU)
Previous Democratic nominee
John Kerry
Democratic nominee
Barack Obama

From January 3 to June 3, 2008, voters of the Democratic Party chose their nominee for president in the 2008 United States presidential election. Senator Barack Obama of Illinois was selected as the nominee, becoming the first African American to secure the presidential nomination of any major political party in the United States. Due to a close race between Obama and Senator Hillary Clinton of New York, the contest remained competitive for longer than expected; neither candidate received enough pledged delegates from state primaries and caucuses to achieve a majority, without endorsements from unpledged delegates (superdelegates).

The presidential primaries actually consisted of both primary elections and caucuses, depending upon what the individual state chose. The goal of the process was to elect the majority of the 4,233 delegates to the 2008 Democratic National Convention, which was held from Monday, August 25, through Thursday, August 28, 2008, in Denver, Colorado. To secure the nomination, a candidate needed to receive at least 2,117 votes at the convention—or a simple majority of the 4,233 delegate votes. This total included half-votes from American Samoa, Guam, and the United States Virgin Islands, in addition to Democrats Abroad, as well as superdelegates—party leaders and elected officials who were not chosen through a primary or caucus. Obama received enough superdelegate endorsements on June 3 to claim that he had secured the simple majority of delegates necessary to win the nomination, before Clinton conceded the nomination four days later. Obama was nominated on the first ballot at the August convention. He went on to win the general election, and became the 44th president of the United States on January 20, 2009. Clinton went on to serve as Obama's Secretary of State for his first term as president, and the Democratic nominee for president in 2016, losing to Donald Trump. These primaries included the nominees for the next three elections: Obama again in 2012, Clinton in 2016, and Biden in 2020.

== Candidates and results ==
Notes for the following table:

- Delegate counts:
  - The pledged delegate estimates come from the sum of the Current estimate columns for the states listed in the Chronicle section later in this article
  - The source for superdelegate estimates is the 2008 Democratic Convention Watch blog. Superdelegate endorsements were frozen on June 7, the date of Clinton's concession speech.
- Ordering:
  - The candidates are ordered by pledged delegate count and then alphabetically by last name
  - To re-sort this table, click on the double-arrow symbol at the top of a column

=== Nominee ===
Candidate	Most recent office held at the end of the primaries	Home State	Pledged delegate vote estimate	Superdelegate vote estimate	Total delegate vote estimate	Campaign status	Running mate
Barack Obama	U.S. Senator from Illinois (2005–2008)	Illinois	1,794½; 51%	478; 66%	2,272½; 53%	(Campaign); Secured nomination: June 3, 2008	Joe Biden

=== Withdrew during the primaries ===
Candidate	Most recent office held at the end of the primaries	Home State	Pledged delegate vote estimate	Superdelegate vote estimate	Total delegate vote estimate	Campaign status
Hillary Clinton	U.S. Senator from New York (2001–2009)	New York	1,731½; 49%	246½; 34%	1,978; 46%	(Campaign) (Endorsed Obama, later became Secretary of State)
John Edwards	U.S. Senator from North Carolina (1999–2005)	North Carolina	14½ <1%	0	14½; 1%	(Campaign); Withdrew: January 30, 2008 (Endorsed Obama)
Joe Biden	U.S. Senator from Delaware (1973–2009)	Delaware	0	0	0	(Campaign); Withdrew: January 3, 2008 (Endorsed Obama, who later chose Biden as his vice presidential running mate)
Bill Richardson	Governor of New Mexico (2003–2011)	New Mexico	0	0	0	(Campaign); Withdrew: January 10, 2008 (Endorsed Obama)
Chris Dodd	U.S. Senator from Connecticut (1981–2011)	Connecticut	0	0	0	(Campaign); Withdrew: January 3, 2008 (Endorsed Obama)
Mike Gravel	U.S. Senator from Alaska (1969–1981)	Alaska	0	0	0	(Campaign); Withdrew: March 26, 2008 (Endorsed Jesse Johnson for Green nomination)
Dennis Kucinich	U.S. Representative for Ohio's 10th (1997–2013)	Ohio	0	0	0	(Campaign); Withdrew: January 23, 2008 (Endorsed Obama)

=== Withdrew before the primaries ===
Candidate	Most recent office held at the end of the primaries	Home State	Pledged delegate vote estimate	Superdelegate vote estimate	Total delegate vote estimate	Campaign status
Tom Vilsack	Governor of Iowa (1999–2007)	Iowa	0	0	0	(Campaign); Withdrew: February 23, 2007 (Endorsed Clinton)

=== Formed exploratory committee but did not run ===
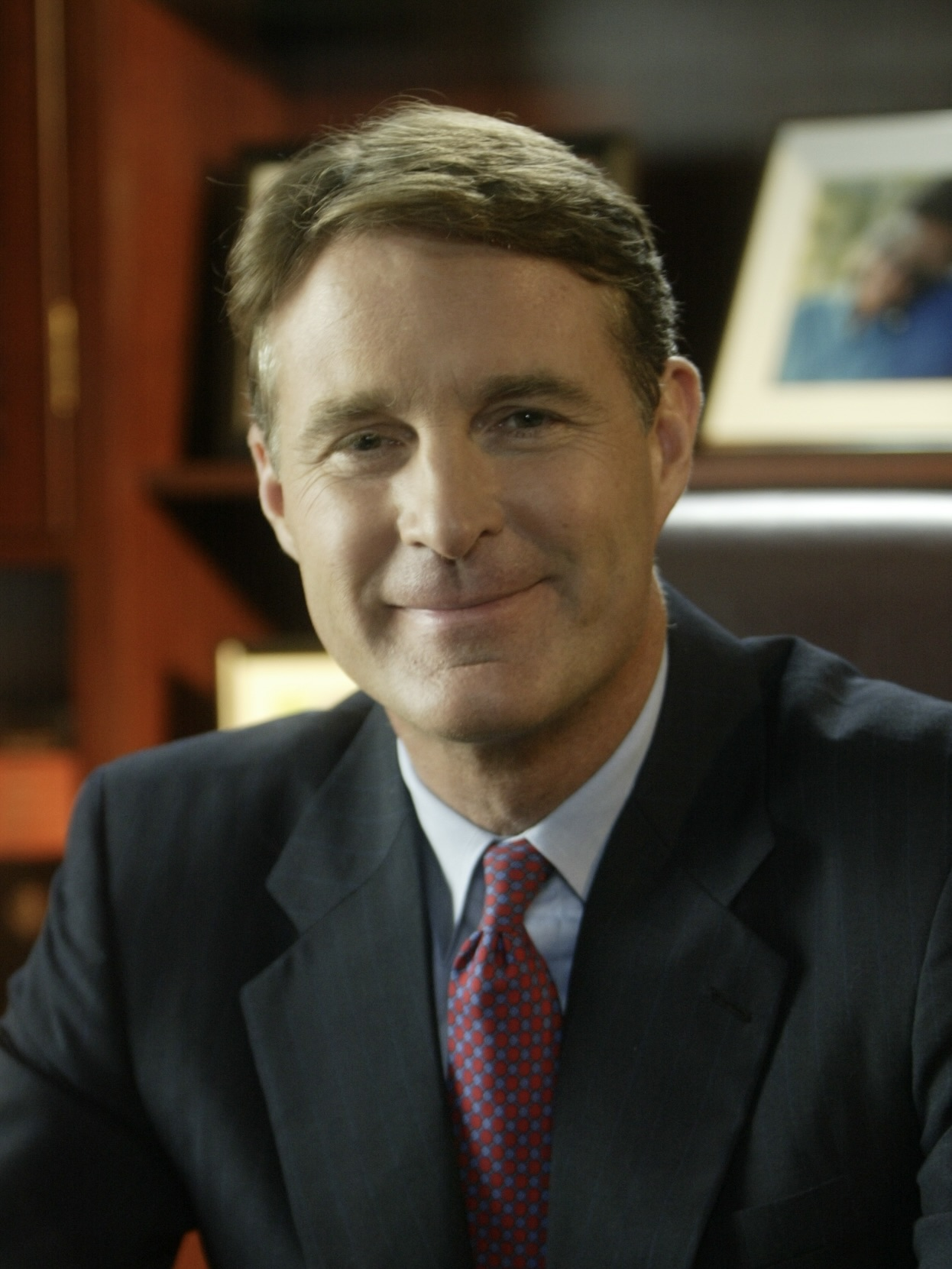
Evan Bayh, U.S. Senator from Indiana

=== Declined to run ===
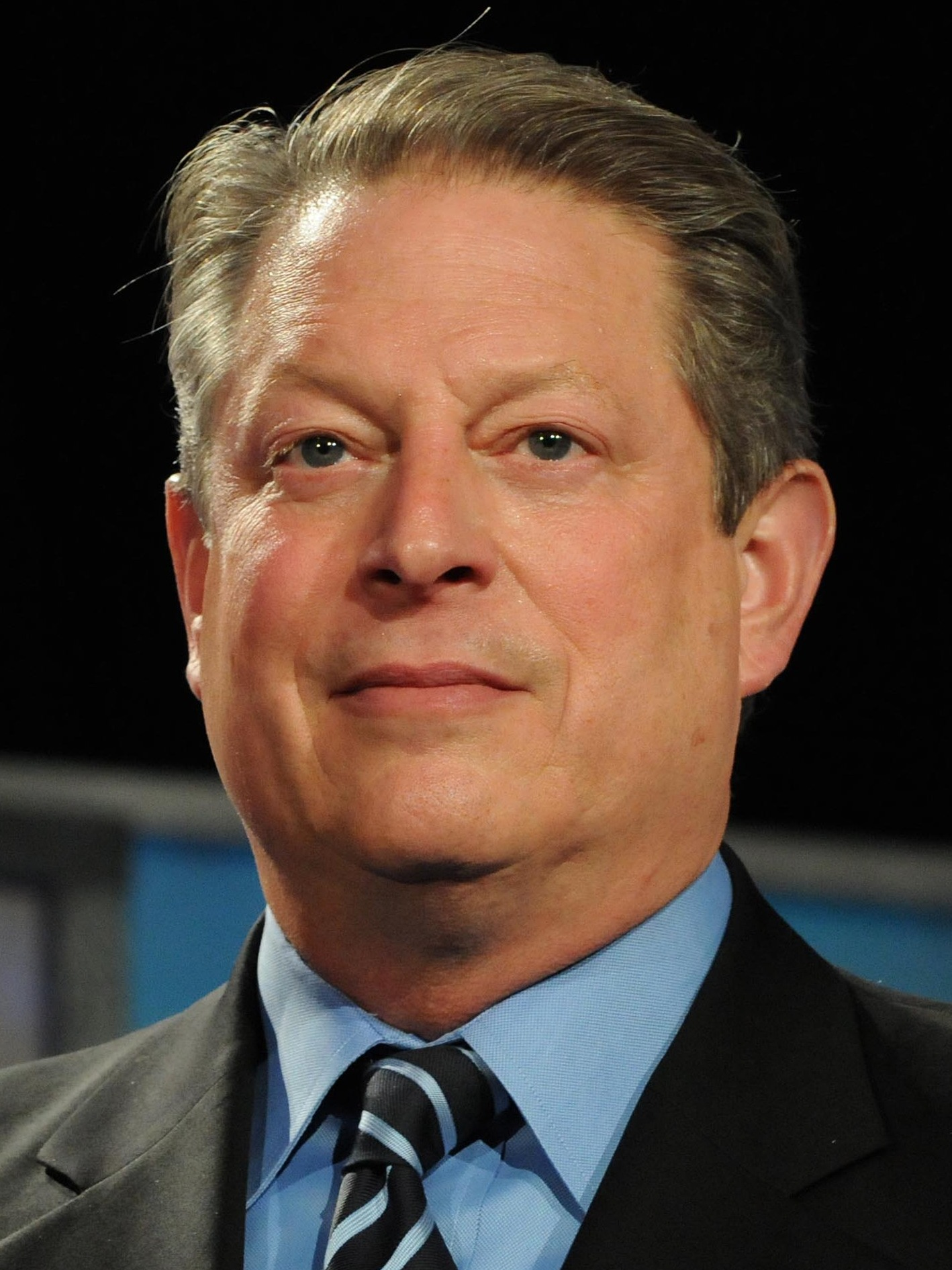
Al Gore, former Vice President and 2000 Democratic nominee

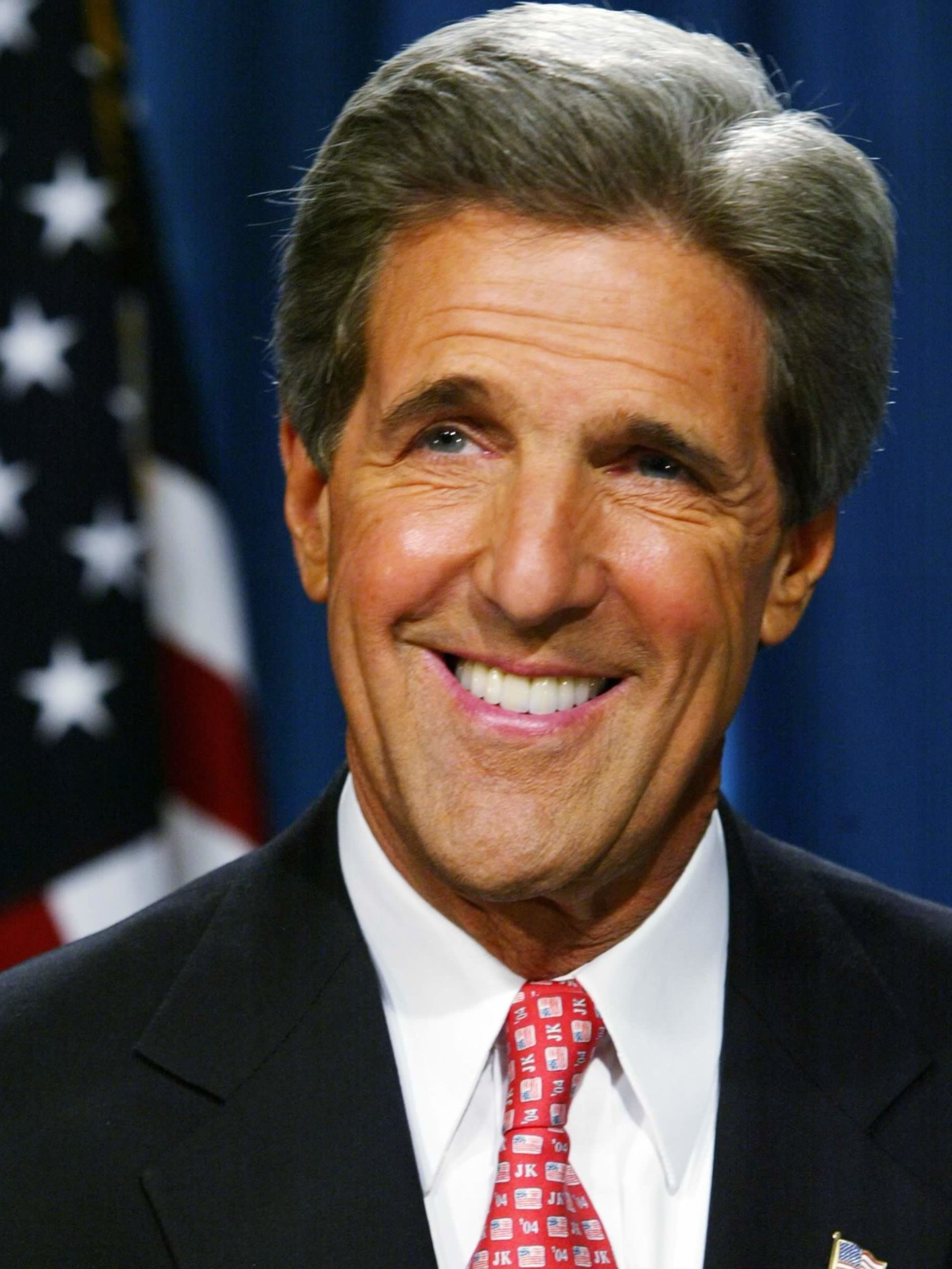
John Kerry, U.S. Senator from Massachusetts and 2004 Democratic nominee (ran successfully for re-election)

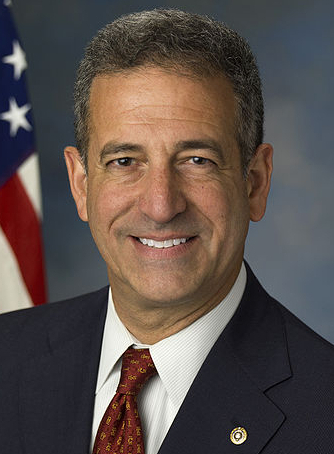
Russ Feingold, U.S. Senator from Wisconsin

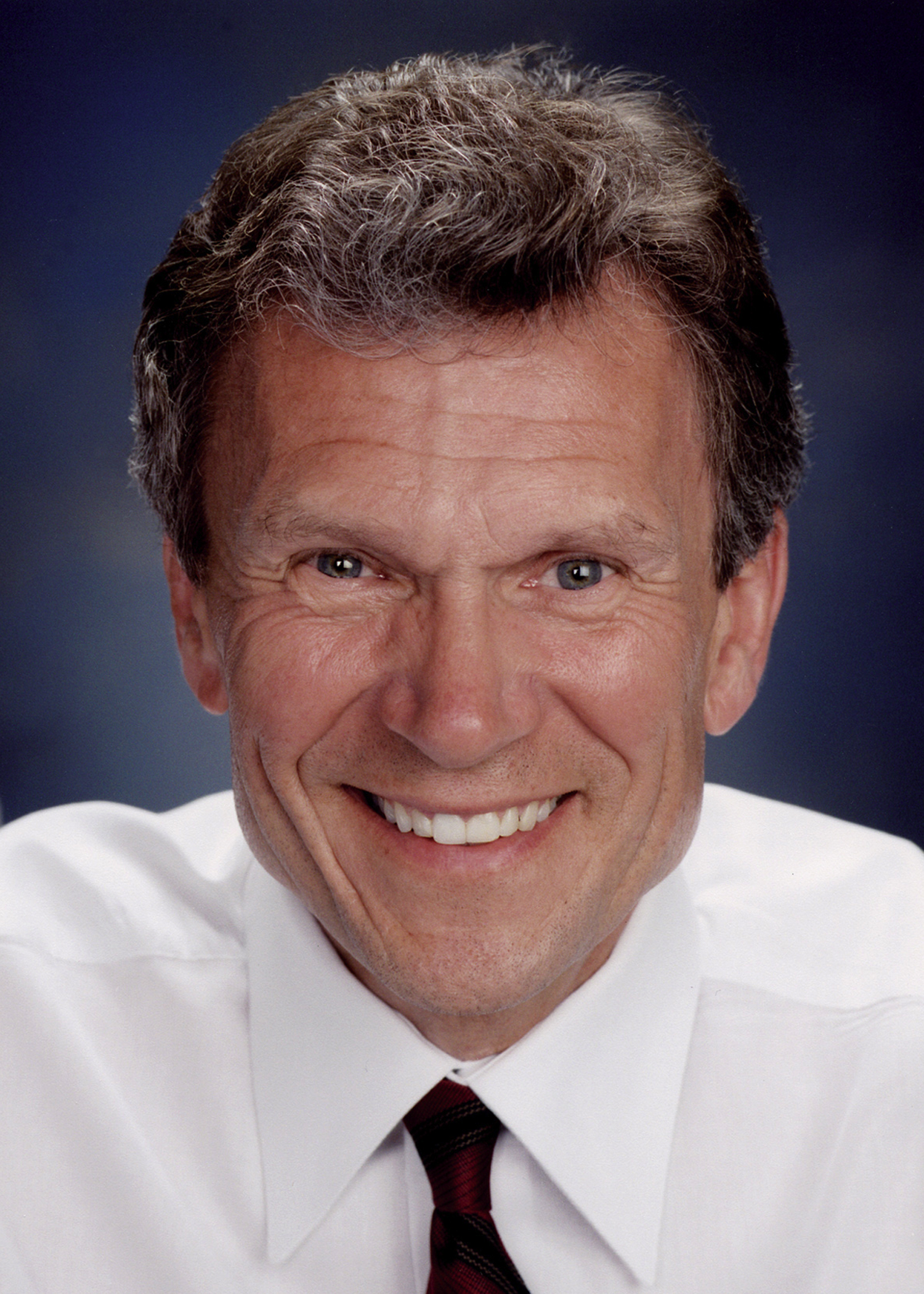
Tom Daschle, former U.S. Senator from South Dakota

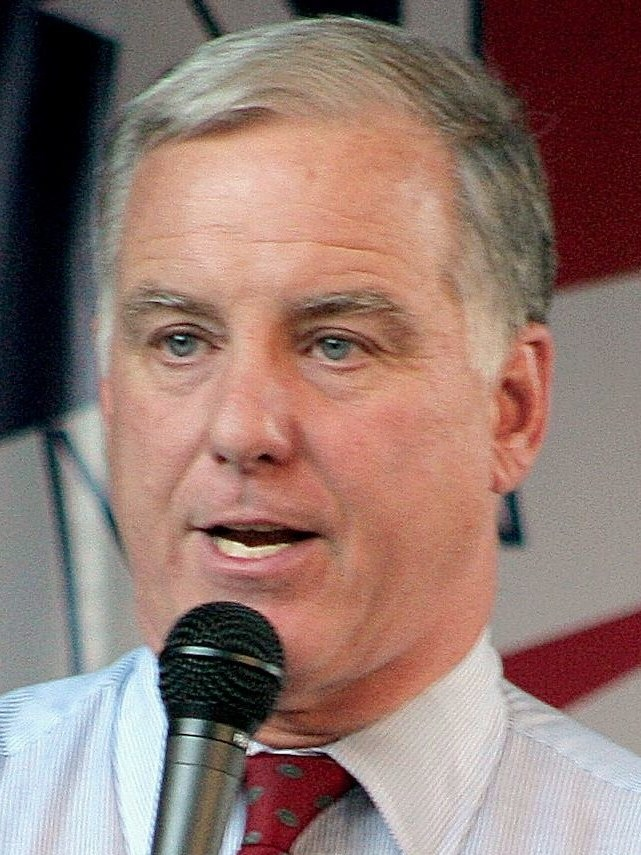
Howard Dean, Chair of the Democratic National Committee and former Governor of Vermont

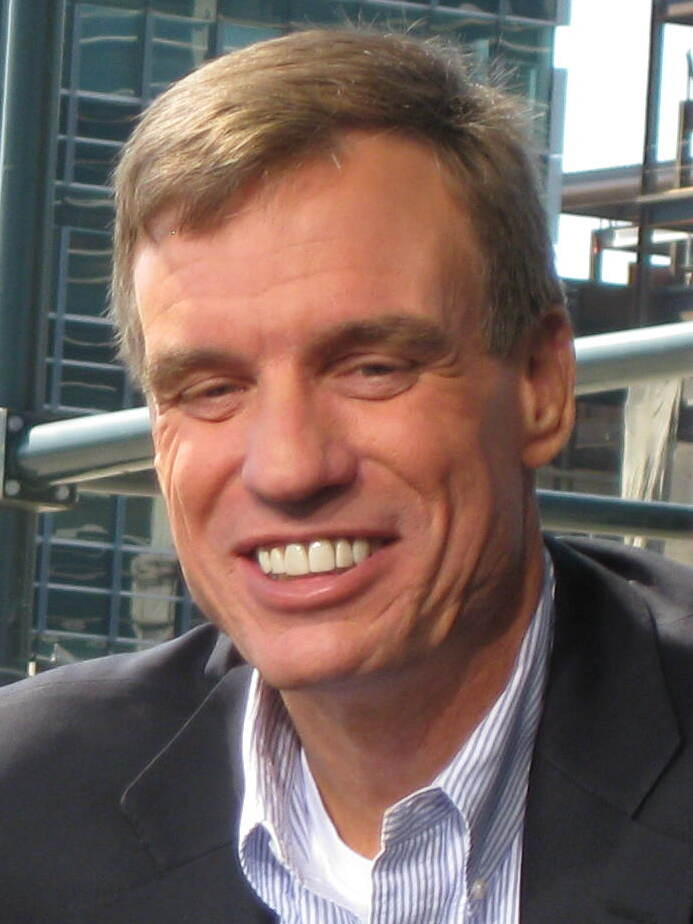
Mark Warner, former Governor of Virginia (ran successfully for U.S. Senate)

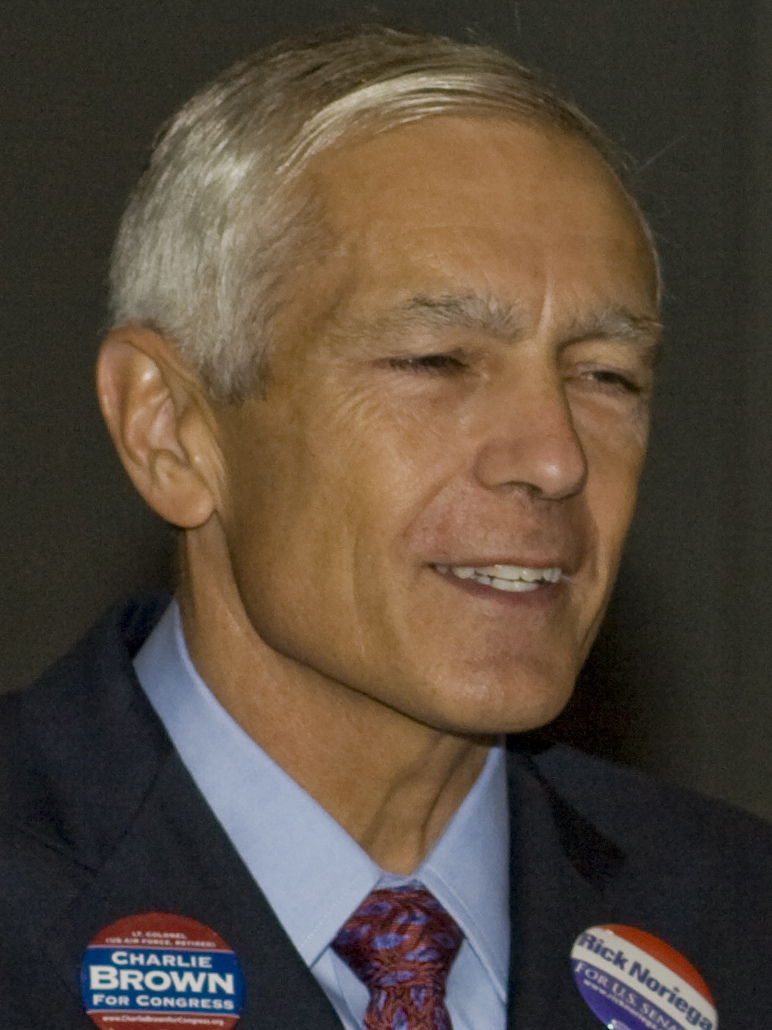
Wesley Clark, former Commander of NATO and 2004 Presidential candidate

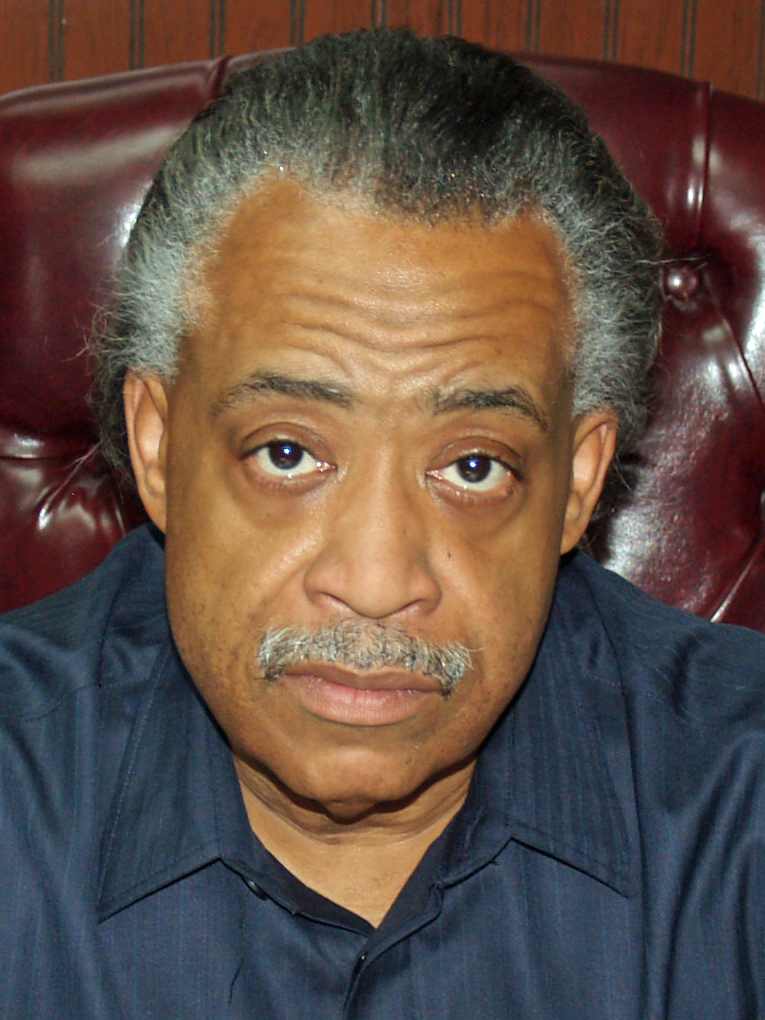
Al Sharpton, Civil Rights Activist

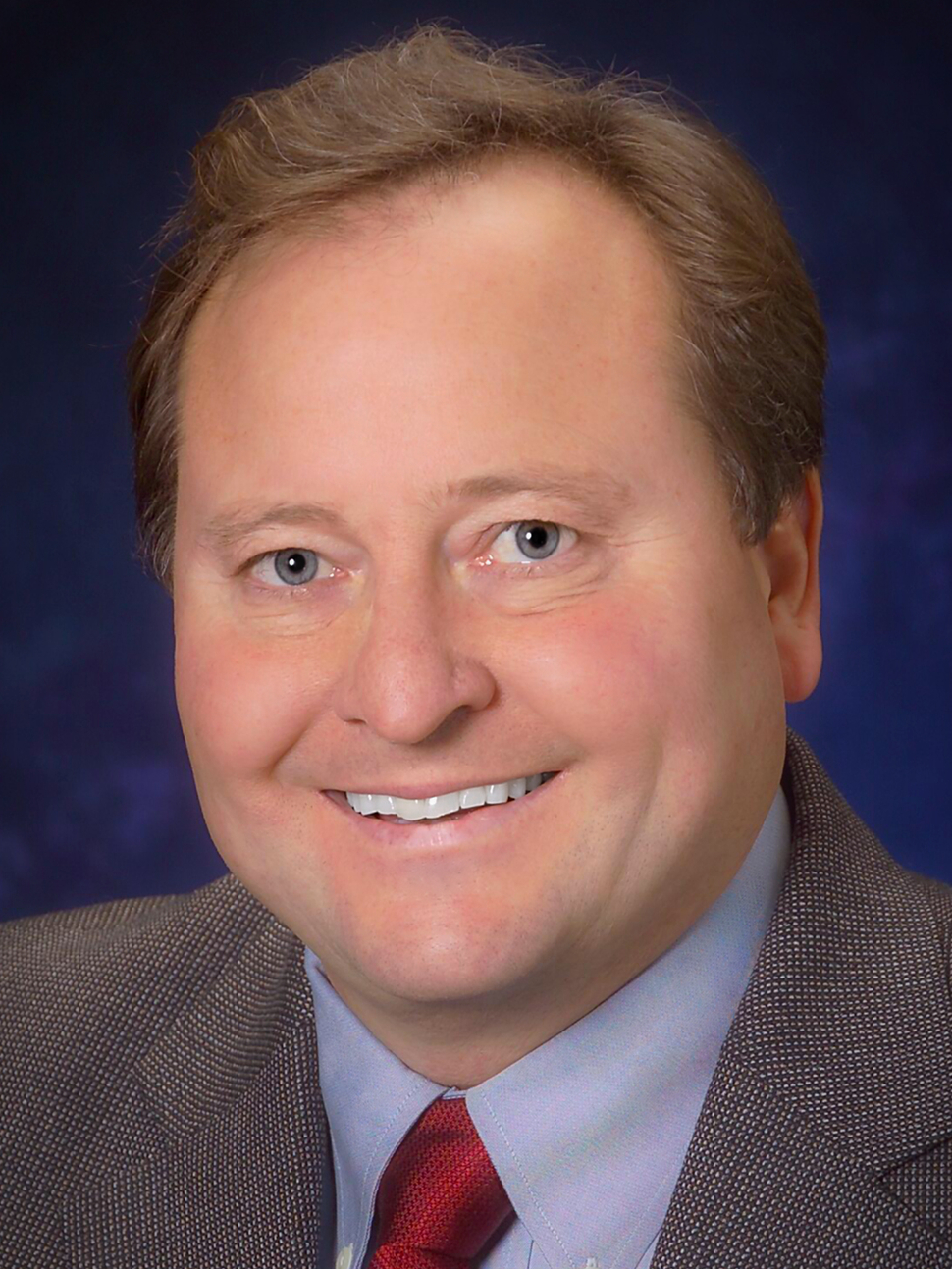
Brian Schweitzer, Governor of Montana (ran successfully for re-election)

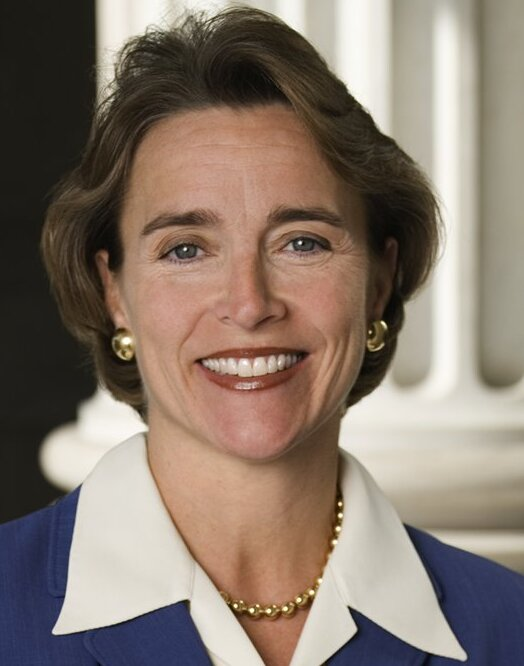
Blanche Lincoln, U.S. Senator from Arkansas

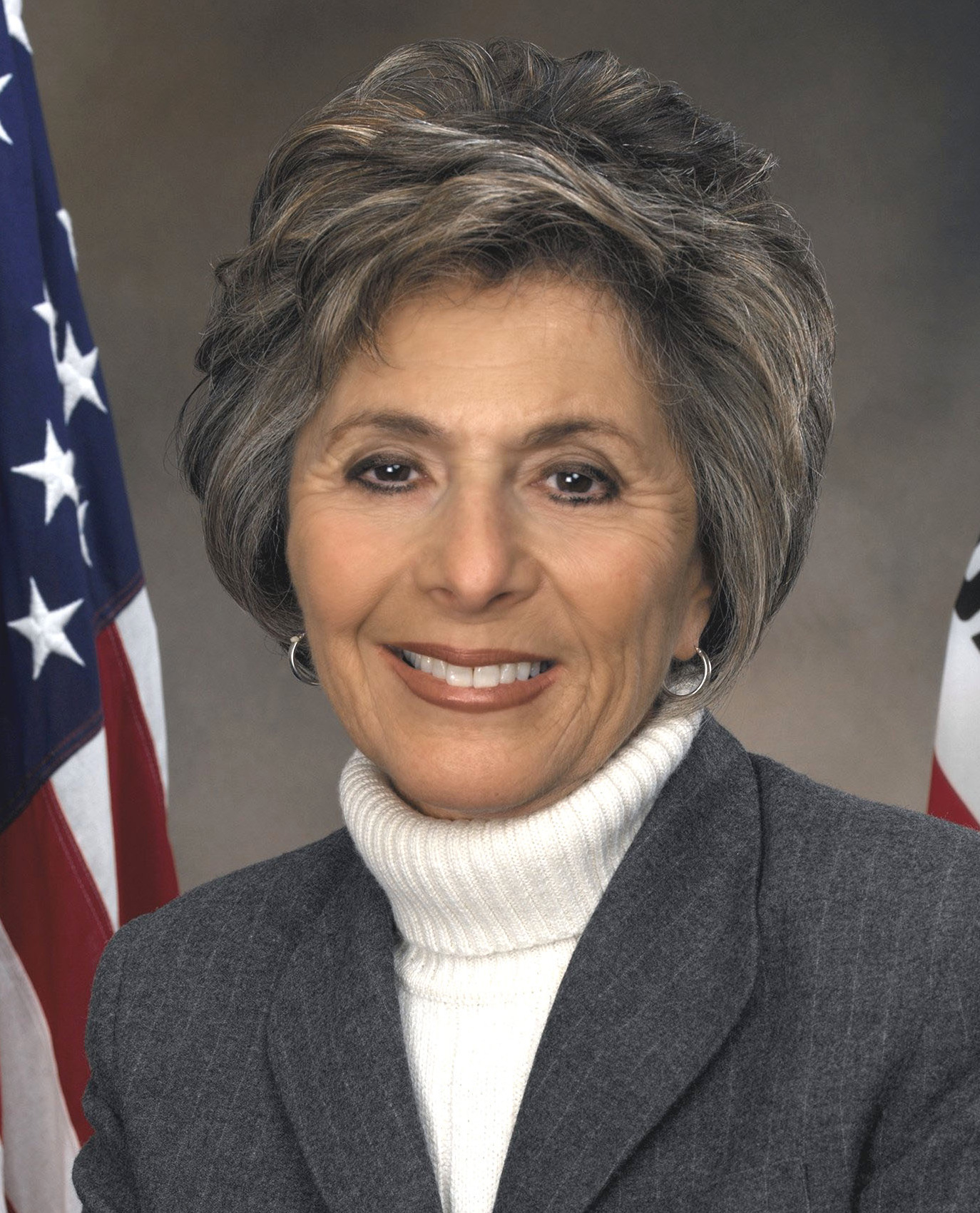
Barbara Boxer, U.S. Senator from California

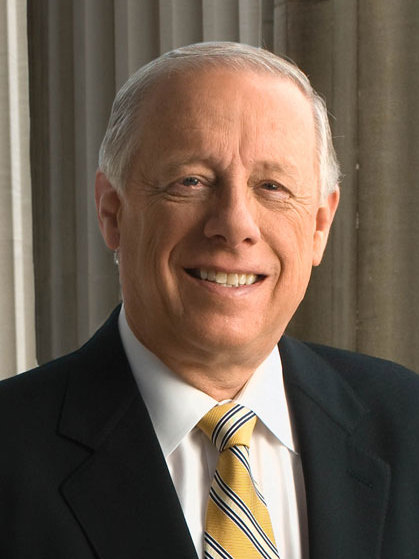
Phil Bredesen, Governor of Tennessee

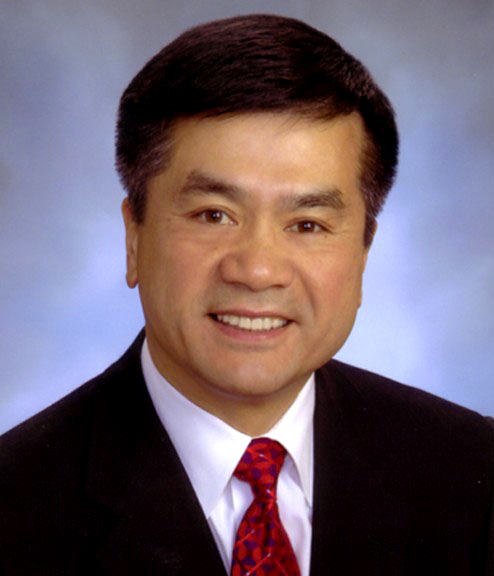
Gary Locke, former Governor of Washington

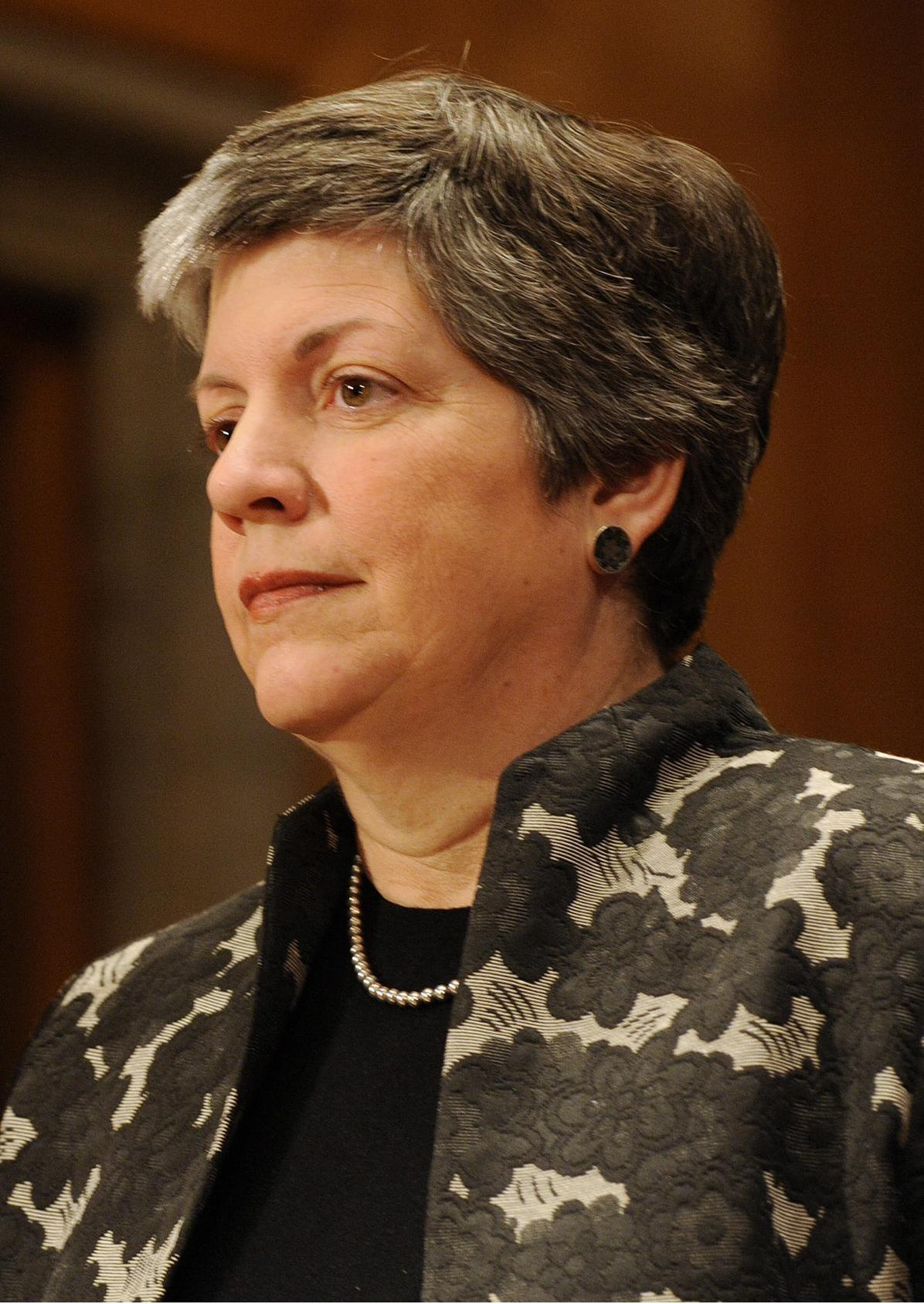
Janet Napolitano, Governor of Arizona

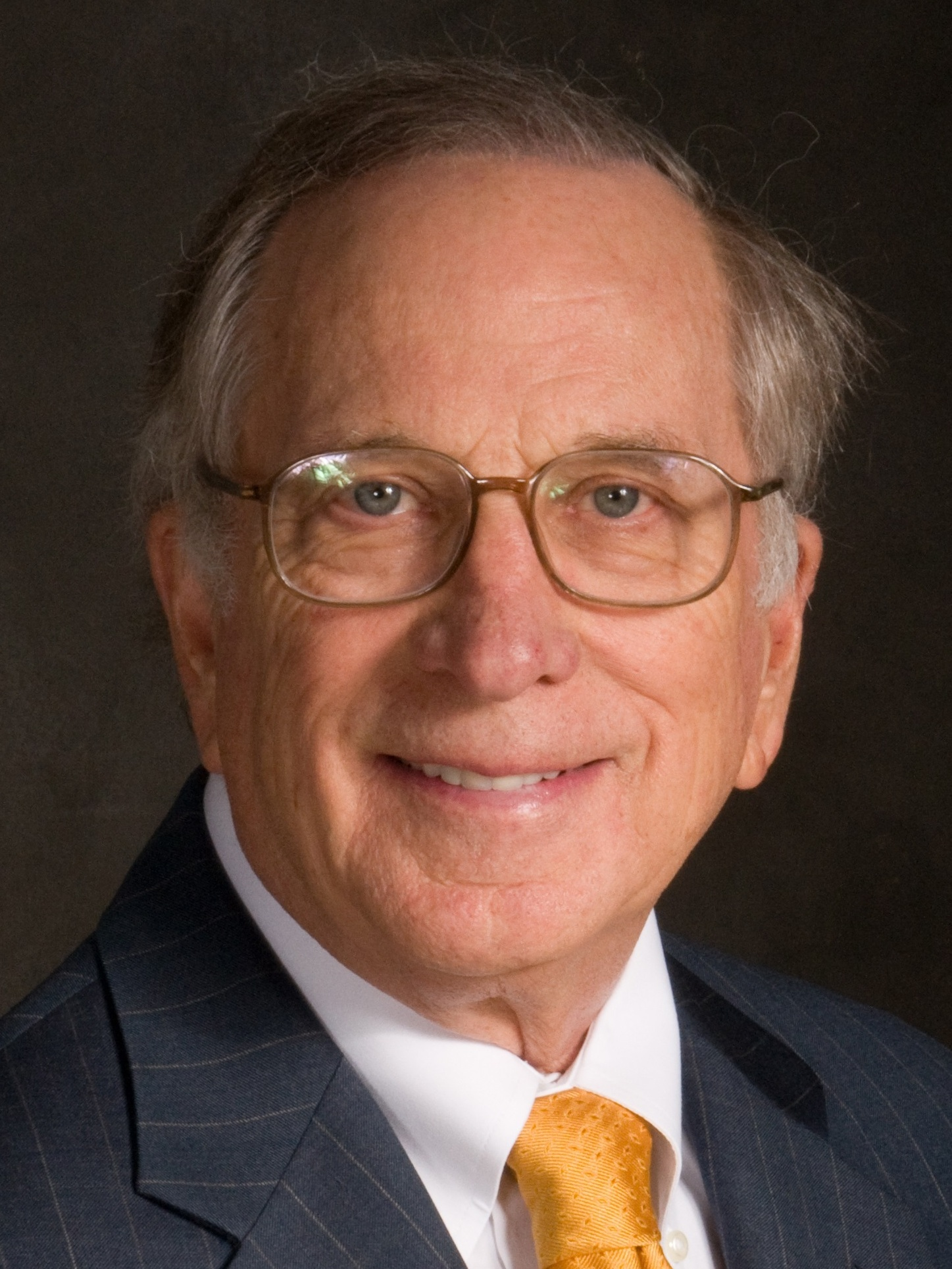
Sam Nunn, former U.S. Senator from Georgia

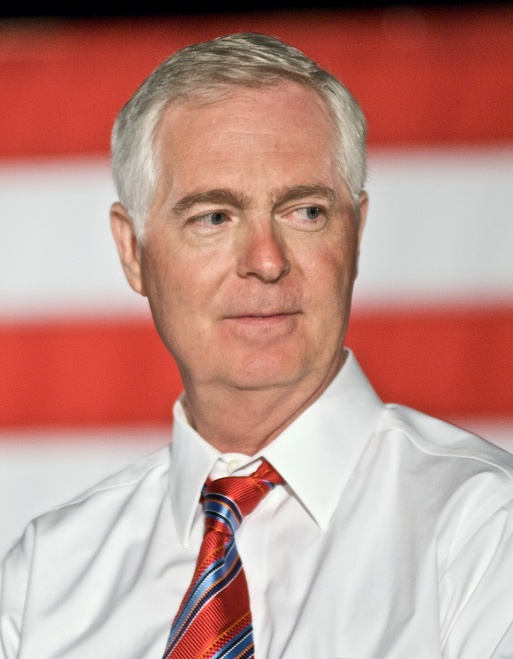
Mike Easley, Governor of North Carolina

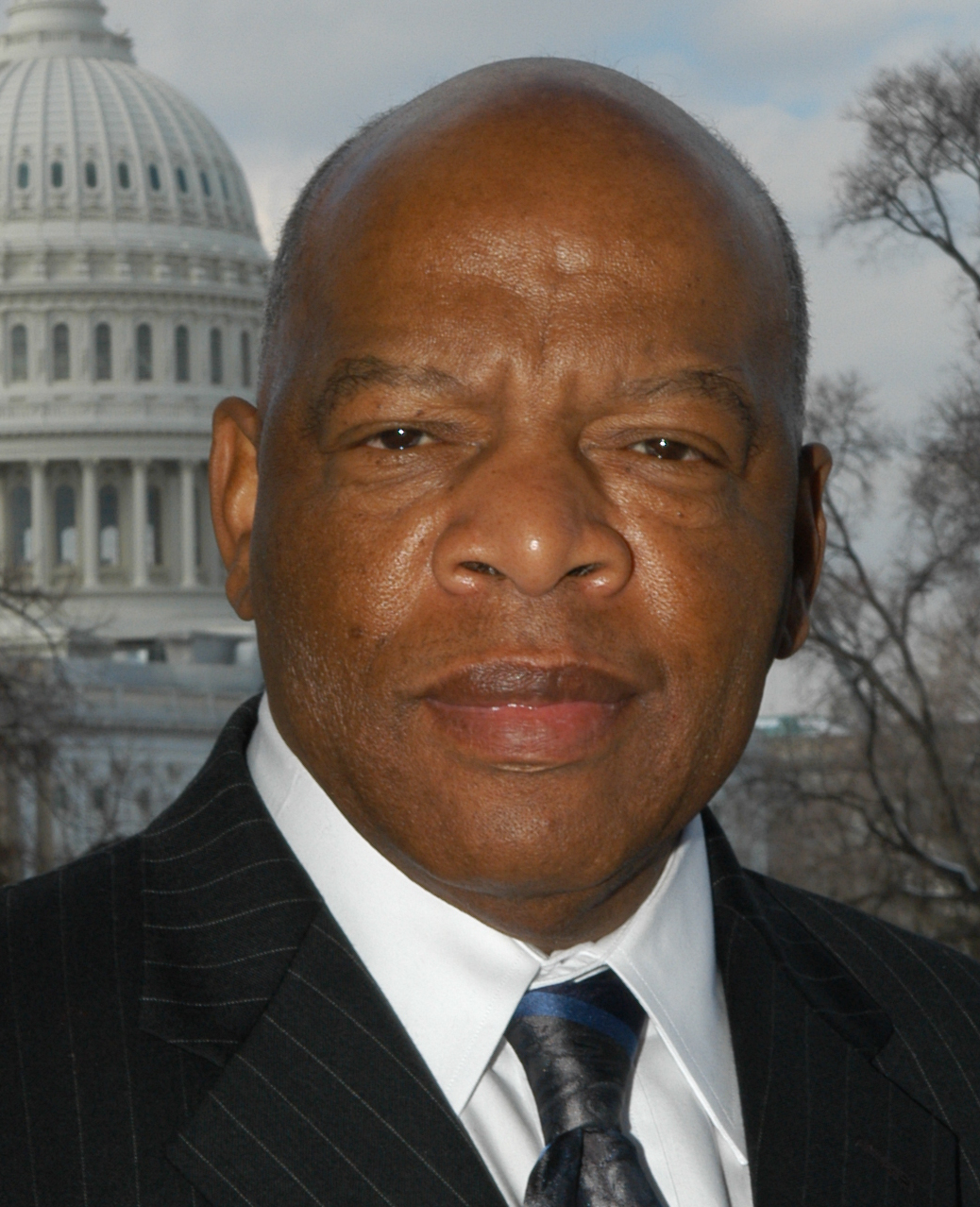
John Lewis, U.S. Representative from Georgia (ran successfully for re-election)

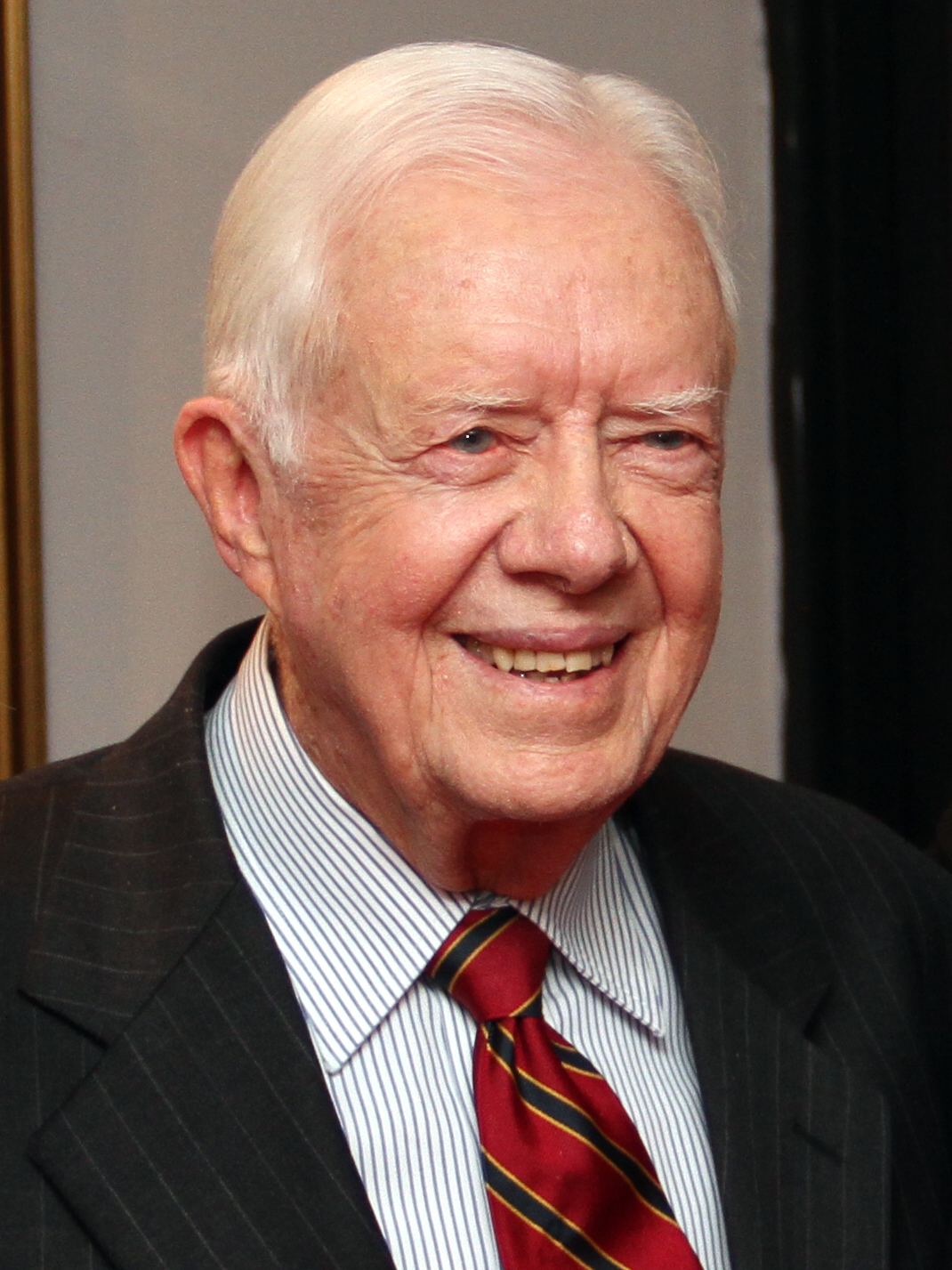
Jimmy Carter, former President from Georgia

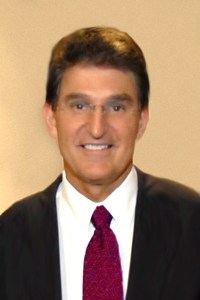
Joe Manchin, Governor of West Virginia (ran successfully for re-election)

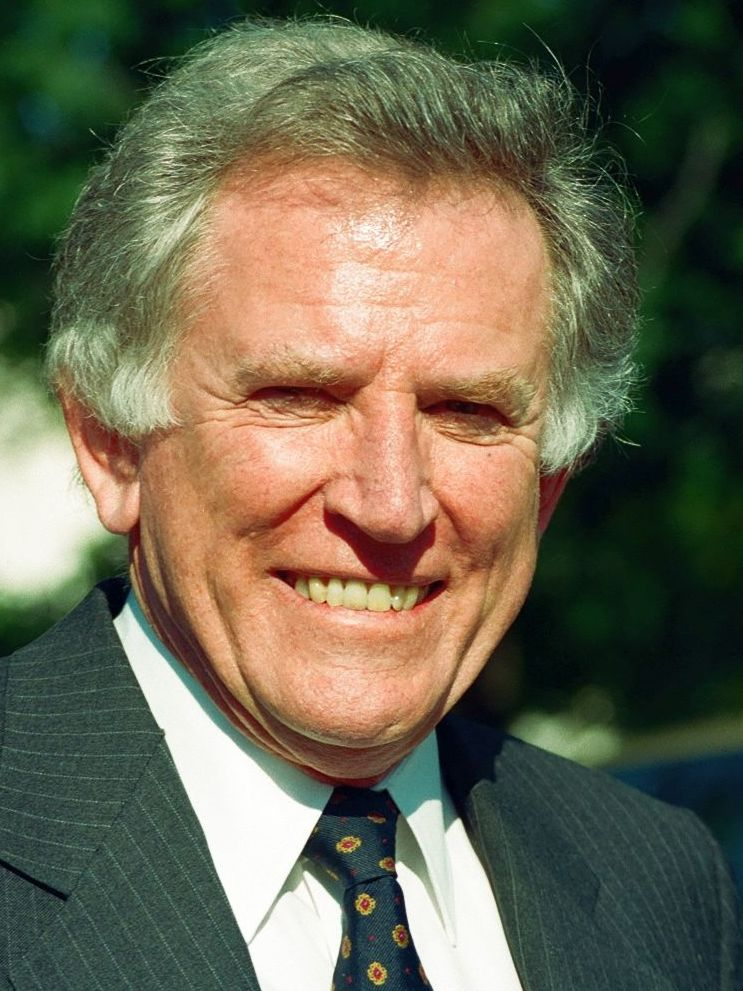
Gary Hart, former U.S. Senator from Colorado

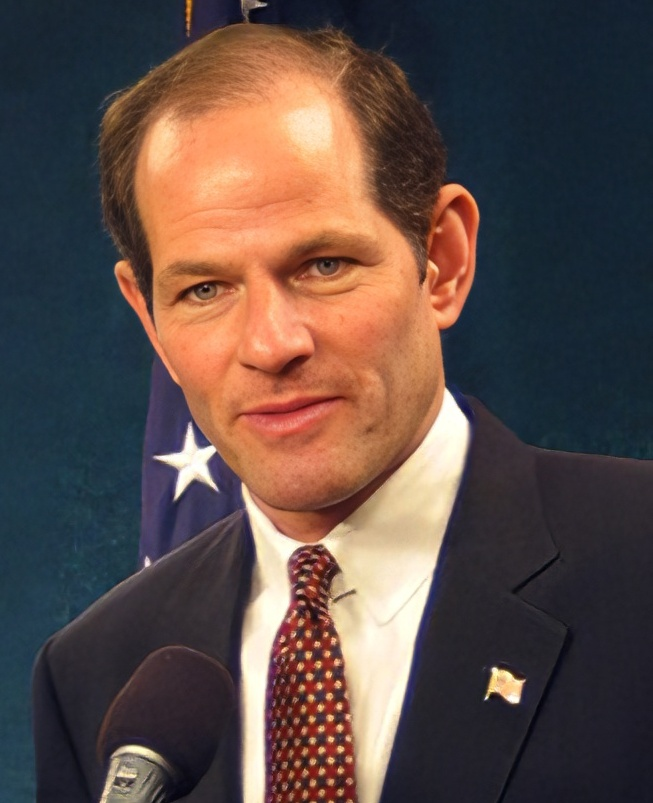
Eliot Spitzer, Governor of New York

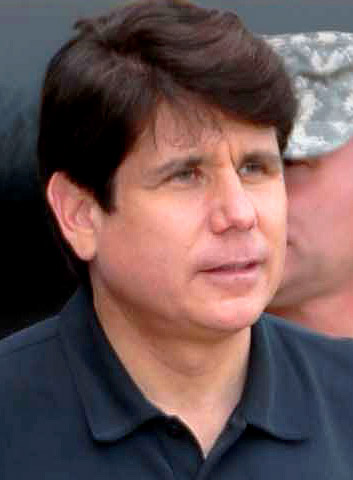
Rod Blagojevich, Governor of Illinois

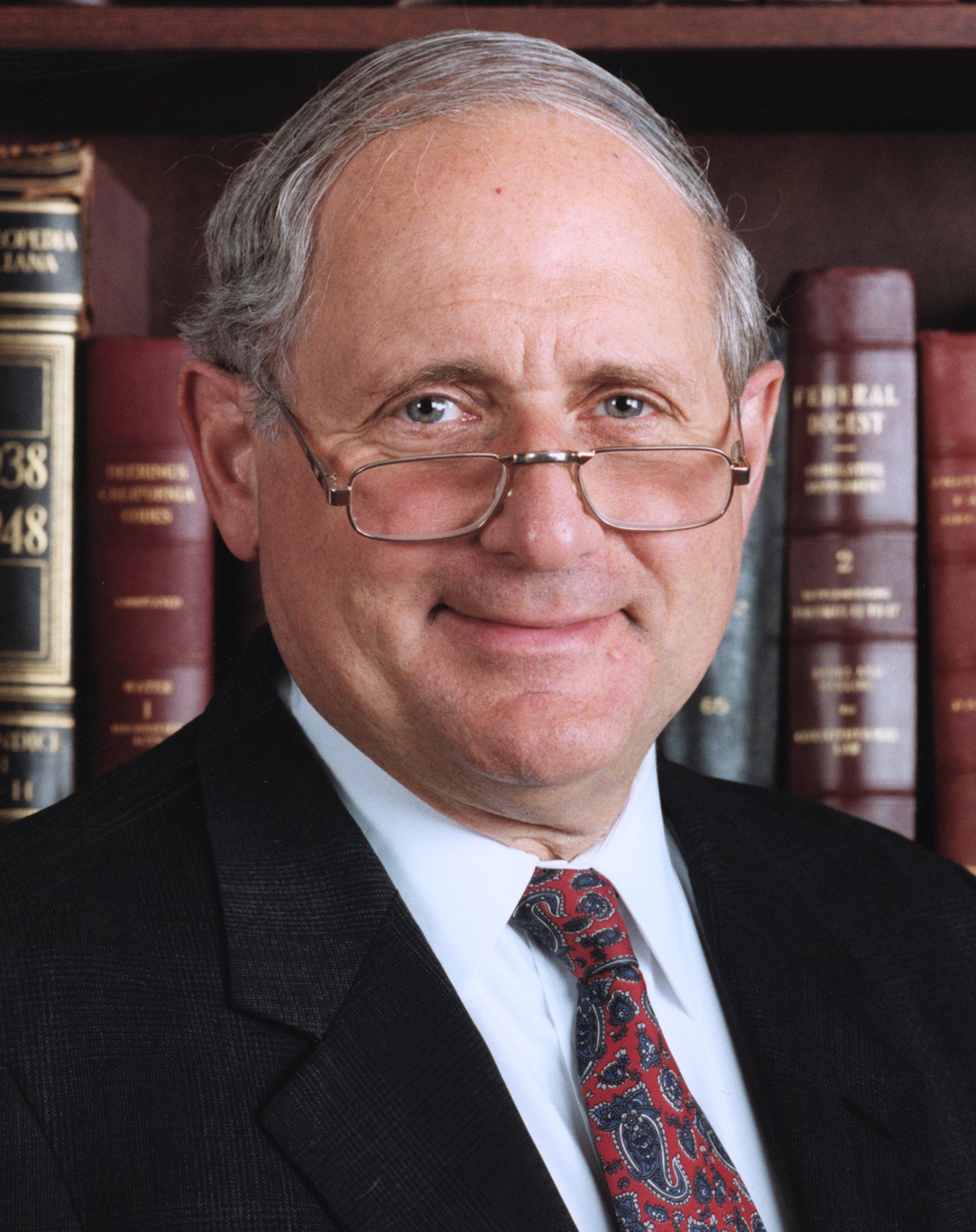
Carl Levin, U.S. Senator from Michigan (ran successfully for re-election)

== Delegate system ==
Delegates are the people who decided the nomination at the Democratic National Convention. Delegates from fifty US states, the District of Columbia, and Puerto Rico had a single vote each, while delegates from American Samoa, the Virgin Islands, Guam and Democrats Abroad, as well as the states of Florida and Michigan, which contravened the schedule, had half a vote each. Thus, the total number of delegates was slightly higher than the total number of available delegate votes (4,049). This is now updated to 4,233 with FL-MI delegations.

=== Pledged delegates ===
In the modern presidential primary system, candidates for the nomination campaign in a series of primary elections and caucus events. For the Democratic Party, the results from these primaries and caucuses determine the number of pledged delegates committed to vote for each candidate at the Democratic National Convention, intended to reflect the will of the voters. These delegates are not legally bound to vote for the candidate they represent, but candidates may remove delegates whom they feel may be disloyal, and delegates generally vote as pledged. Under the party's Delegate Selection Rules for the 2008 Democratic National Convention, delegates were allocated to each of the fifty U.S. states according to two main criteria: the proportion of votes each state had given to the Democratic candidate in the previous three presidential elections, and the percentage of votes each state had in the United States Electoral College. In addition, fixed numbers of delegates were allocated to the District of Columbia, Puerto Rico, American Samoa, Guam, the U.S. Virgin Islands, and Democrats Abroad. In 2008, a total of 3,253 pledged delegate votes would be awarded through the primaries and caucuses.

=== Superdelegates ===
Superdelegate votes are given equal weight to the votes of pledged delegates. Superdelegates are members of the United States House of Representatives and Senate, state and territorial governors, members of the Democratic National Committee, distinguished party leaders, and add-on delegates selected by the state parties. They represented almost 20 percent of the total 4,233 delegates.

The number and composition of superdelegates had the potential to change right up to the start of the Democratic National Convention. The total number of superdelegate votes at the start of the primary season in October 2007 stood at 850. Various events such as deaths, elections, and disqualifications may alter the final number of superdelegates voting in the primary.

While officially uncommitted until the convention, the superdelegates may publicly endorse or commit to a candidate at any time. The presidential candidates compete heavily for these commitments. News organizations survey the superdelegates periodically throughout the election season and try to calculate how many have committed to each of the candidates. The media often include these superdelegate estimates in their reporting on the race, leading to differing delegate counts from various news sources.

=== Delegate selection rules ===
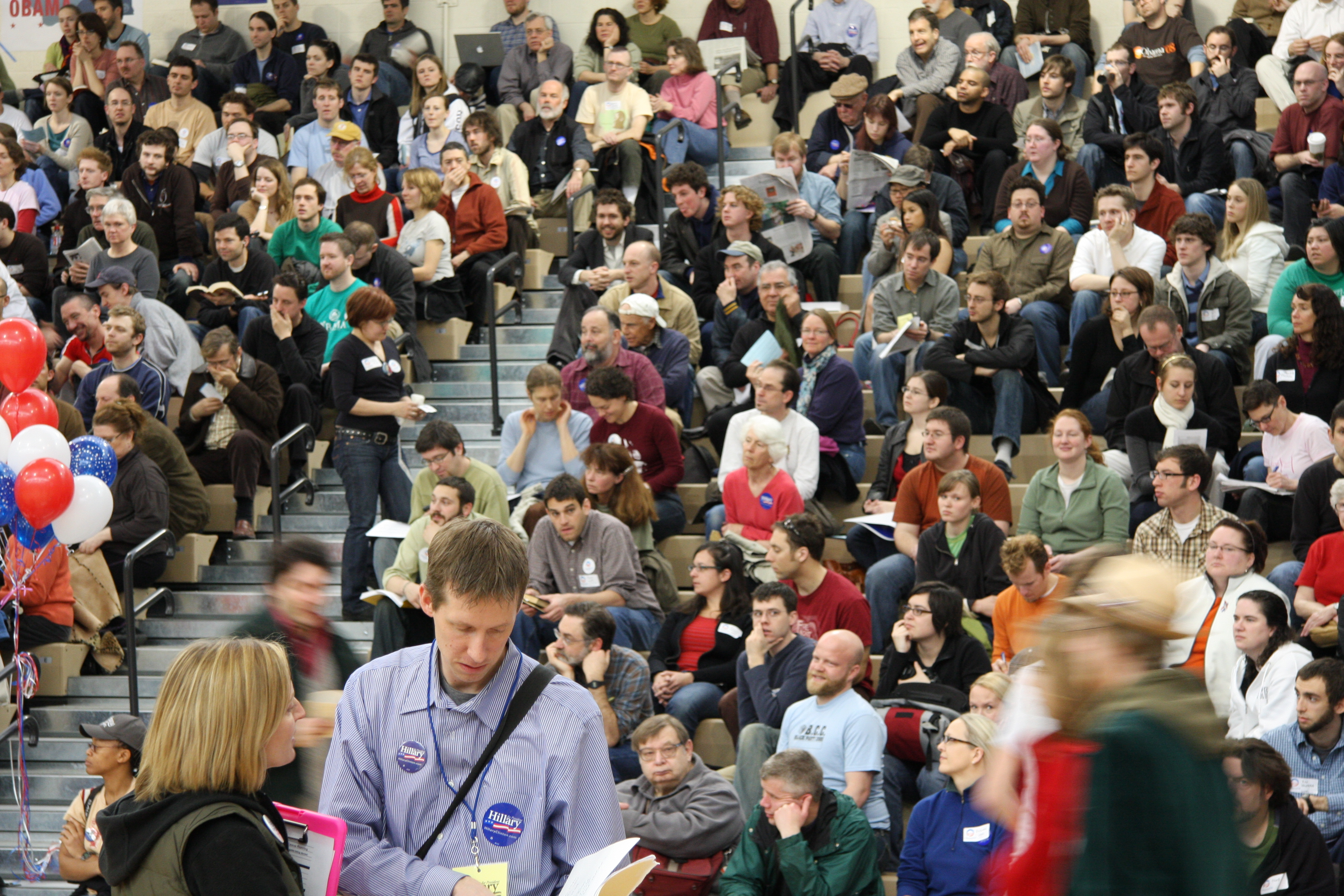
Washington Democrats meet in the legislative district caucuses.

Under the Democratic Party's Delegate Selection Rules for the 2008 Democratic National Convention, delegates are awarded by proportional representation, with a minimum 15 percent threshold required to receive delegates. Each state party is required to publish its own state level delegate selection plan, indicating how the state will select delegates at the congressional and statewide level, how the delegation will implement the party's affirmative action policy, and how the delegation will ensure an equal balance between women and men. Those plans were adopted at state conventions and forwarded to the national party in mid-2007.

In most state caucuses, the viability threshold must be met at each level in the process, from the precinct level upwards. This puts enormous pressure on the remaining candidates to gain the support of voters whose chosen candidates fall below the 15 percent mark. The focus on viability is designed to weed out small, divisive factions from gaining delegates to disrupt the national convention. However, this can result in candidates gaining viability in some precincts but not in others, and a complicated "caucus math" is required to allocate delegates to the county and state conventions for each precinct. In the primaries, the viability threshold is set based on statewide and congressional district votes. At-large and PLEO (Party Leaders and Elected Officials) delegates are allocated based on statewide votes, while district-level delegates are allocated by district votes.

== Opinion polling ==
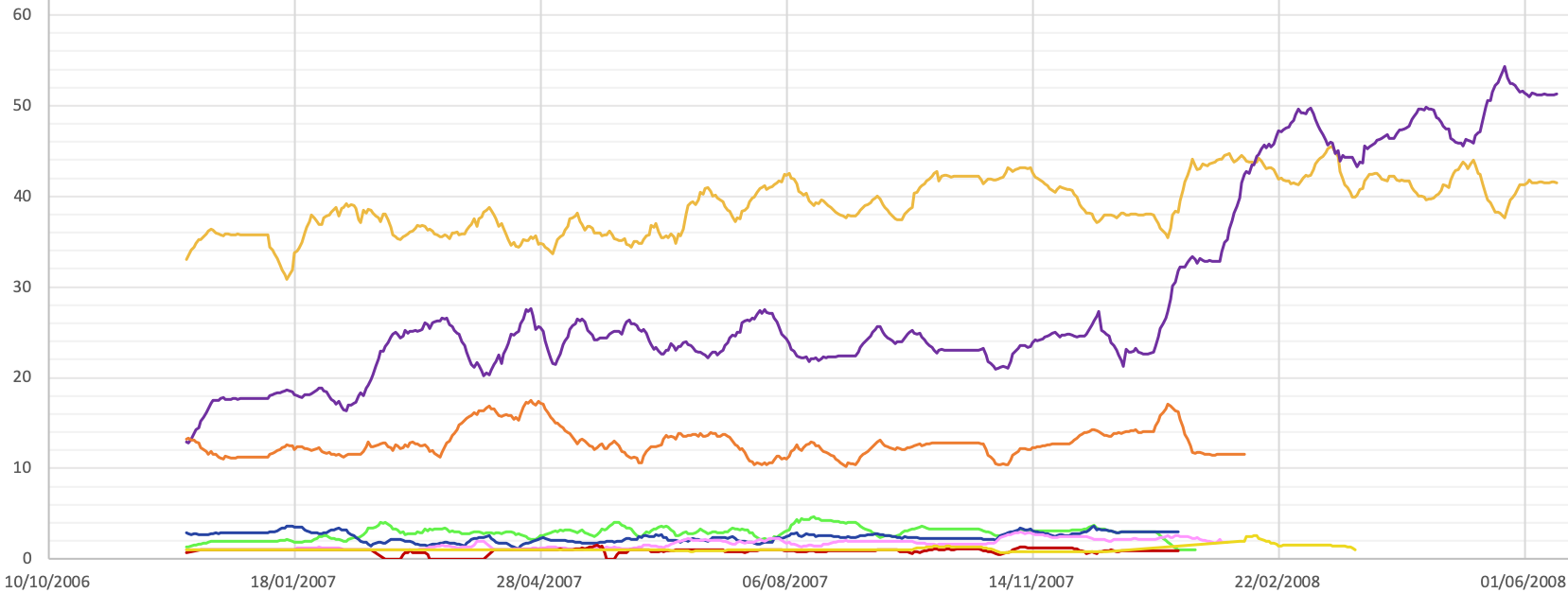
Opinion polling for the 2008 Democratic presidential primary (moving average is calculated from the last ten polls) Obama Clinton Edwards Richardson Biden Kucinich Dodd Gravel

== Campaign ==
Notes for the tables in this section:

- Delegate votes to the convention column:
  - The source for delegation sizes is the Democratic National Committee's official Call for the 2008 Democratic National Convention. Specific sources are present for Florida and Michigan. Very recent changes not already in the official source are indicated by the footnotes.
- Pledged delegate votes column:
  - The source is each state's primary or caucus article. Click on the specific election link to see the sources used in those articles.
  - The candidate with the highest pledged delegate vote is highlighted. In some cases, this may be different from the winner of the popular vote.

=== Early campaigning ===
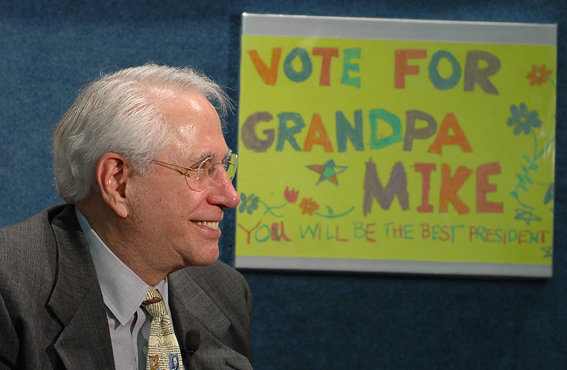
Mike Gravel at the launch of his presidential campaign in April 2006

The earliest significant candidate to launch their candidacy was Mike Gravel in April 2006. However, for the most part, the race for the 2008 presidential nomination did not truly begin in earnest until after the 2006 midterm elections. Between November 2006 and February 2007, nine major candidates opened their campaigns: Evan Bayh as an exploratory committee, Joe Biden, Hillary Clinton, Chris Dodd, John Edwards, Dennis Kucinich, Barack Obama, Bill Richardson, and Tom Vilsack. Potential candidates John Kerry, Al Gore, Russ Feingold, Tom Daschle, Wesley Clark, Sam Nunn, Mark Warner, and Al Sharpton reportedly considered running but ultimately declined to seek the nomination. Bayh said he would not seek the nomination on December 16, 2006, and withdrew from the race. Soon Vilsack dropped out in February 2007.

During the first three months of 2007, Clinton and Obama raised over $20 million each, while Edwards raised more than $12 million. The three candidates quickly became the frontrunners for the nomination, a status they held all the way through the end of 2007.

On November 21, Obama announced that Oprah Winfrey would be campaigning for him in the early primary states, setting off speculation that, although celebrity endorsements typically have little effect on voter opinions, Winfrey's participation would supply Obama with a large, receptive audience. As word spread that Oprah's first appearance would be in Iowa, polls released in early December revealed that Obama had taken the lead in that decisive state. Then, on December 8, Oprah kicked off a three-state tour supporting Obama's campaign, where she drew record-setting crowds in Iowa, New Hampshire, and South Carolina, and was described as "more cogent, more effective, more convincing" than anyone on the campaign trail. The Oprah-Obama tour dominated political news headlines and cast doubts over Clinton's ability to recover her recently lost lead in Iowa caucus polls. A poll released less than two weeks after Winfrey campaigned found that Obama had achieved more popularity in Iowa than ever recorded before.

At year's end, on December 31, Clinton held a substantial lead in superdelegates, and she was leading in the national polls with 42% of likely voters, over Obama with 23%, and Edwards with 16%. However, Edwards and Obama remained close in state polls for the early contests, including the Iowa caucuses, where the final polling average had Obama leading narrowly with 31%, over Clinton with 30%, Edwards with 26%, Biden with 5%, and Richardson also with 5%.

=== January 2008 ===
Following tradition, the 2008 primary calendar began with the Iowa caucuses and the New Hampshire primary. The Nevada caucuses and the South Carolina primary were the third and fourth contests sanctioned by the Democratic National Committee. Under the national committee's rules, no state was allowed to hold primaries or caucuses before February 5 with the exceptions of these four states. Michigan and Florida also held early primaries. However, as the contests were unsanctioned, the results were not recognized by the national committee until a compromise was reached four months later.

The following table shows the pledged delegate votes awarded in the first four contests recognized by the DNC.

Details		Delegate votes to the convention			Pledged delegate vote count						
Details		Delegate votes to the convention			Election result			Change notes	Final estimate		
Date	Election link	Pledged	Super	Total	Obama	Clinton	Edwards	Change notes	Obama	Clinton	Edwards
January 3	Iowa caucuses	45	12	57	16	15	14		28	14	3
January 8	New Hampshire primary	22	8	30	9	9	4		13	9	0
January 19	Nevada caucuses	25	9	34	13	12	0		14	11	0
January 26	South Carolina primary	45	9	54	25	12	8		33	12	0
–	Total	137	38	175	63	48	26		88	46	3

January election results
Results of Iowa's caucus

Results of New Hampshire's primary

Results of Nevada's caucus

Results of South Carolina's primary

Obama won the Iowa caucuses with 38% of the vote, over Edwards with 30% and Clinton with 29%. His victory brought him to national prominence as many voters tuned into the race for the first time. In a speech given that evening, he defined the word "change" as the primary theme of his campaign and said, "On this January night, at this defining moment in history, you have done what the cynics said we couldn't do." The delegate count was virtually tied, but Clinton's surprising third-place finish in the popular vote damaged her image as being the "inevitable" nominee. However, she remained upbeat, saying "This race begins tonight and ends when Democrats throughout America have their say. Our campaign was built for a marathon." The following day, reports described "panic" among some Clinton donors, and rumors of a staff shake-up began to circulate. Biden and Dodd both withdrew from the race.

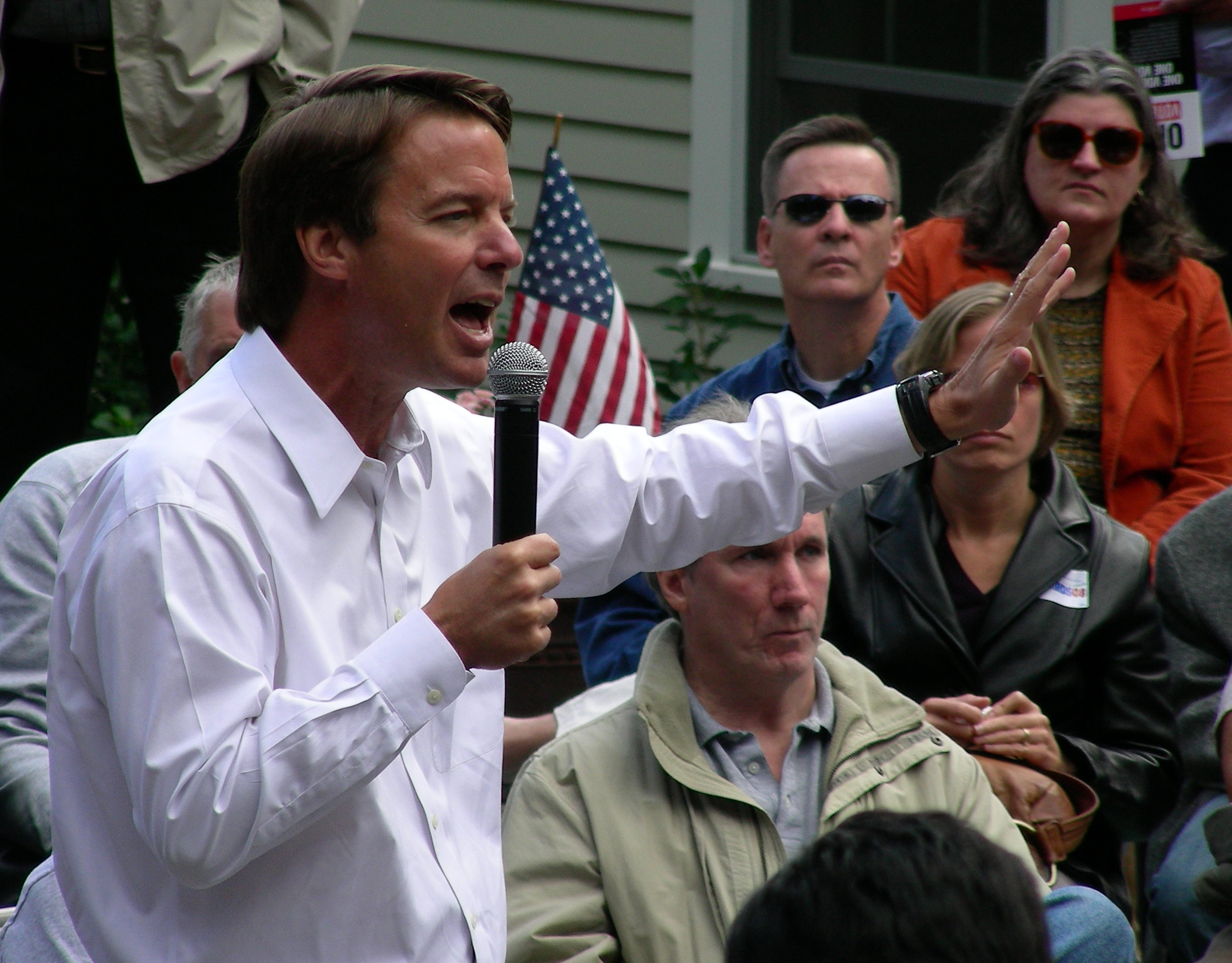
John Edwards greets a crowd in New Hampshire.

After Obama's upset win in the Iowa caucuses, it appeared to many political observers that he would ride a wave of momentum through the New Hampshire primary and then go on to win the Democratic nomination. Eulogies were published on the Clinton campaign, as Obama surged to a roughly 10-point lead in the New Hampshire polls. However, the race turned quickly in the days before the primary, and the polls were slow to register a reversal toward Clinton. At the Saint Anselm College New Hampshire debate on January 5, 2008, Edwards sided with Obama against Clinton. In one noted exchange, Edwards said that Clinton could not bring about change, while he and Obama could, saying "Any time you speak out powerfully for change, the forces for status quo attack." Clinton passionately retorted, saying, "Making change is not about what you believe; it's not about a speech you make. It's about working hard. I'm not just running on a promise for change. I'm running on 35 years of change. What we need is somebody who can deliver change. We don't need to be raising false hopes." It came to be seen as the defining statement for her candidacy.

The morning before the primary, Clinton became "visibly emotional" in response to a friendly question from a voter. Video of the moment was replayed on cable news television throughout the day, accompanied by pundit commentary that ranged from sympathetic to callous in tone. Voters rallied to Clinton's defense, and she won a surprising 3% victory over Obama in the popular vote. They tied in the delegate count. Richardson withdrew from the race on January 10. Momentum shifted in Clinton's favor, and she won the popular vote in the Nevada caucuses eleven days later, despite Obama's endorsement from the influential Culinary Workers Union. However, Obama ran strongly in rural areas throughout the state, and he beat Clinton in the delegate count. Edwards' support collapsed in Nevada, as voters coalesced around the two apparent frontrunners. Dennis Kucinich withdrew from the race. In the following week, issues regarding race came to the fore as campaigning began for the South Carolina primary, the first to feature a large proportion of African Americans in the Democratic electorate. Behind in the state polls, Clinton left to campaign in some Super Tuesday states, while her husband, former president Bill Clinton, stayed in South Carolina and engaged in a series of exchanges with Obama. CBS News reported, "By injecting himself into the Democratic primary campaign with a series of inflammatory and negative statements, Bill Clinton may have helped his wife's presidential hopes in the long term but at the cost of his reputation with a group of voters African Americans that have long been one of his strongest bases of political support."

Obama won by a more than two-to-one margin over Clinton, gaining 55% of the vote to her 27% and Edwards's 18%. On the day of the primary, Bill Clinton compared Obama's expected win to Jesse Jackson's victory in the 1988 South Carolina Democratic primary. His comments were widely criticized as an apparent attempt to dismiss the primary results and marginalize Obama by implying that he was "the black candidate." The momentum generated by Obama's larger-than-expected win in South Carolina was deflated somewhat by the win Clinton claimed in the nullified Florida primary the following week. Edwards suspended his candidacy on January 30. He did not immediately endorse either Clinton or Obama, but he said they both had pledged to carry forward his central campaign theme of ending poverty in America. Neither Clinton nor Obama had a clear advantage heading into the February 5 Super Tuesday primaries, with 23 states and territories and 1,681 delegates at stake and more media attention than any primary election day in American history.

=== Disputed primaries ===
In August 2006, the Democratic National Committee adopted a proposal by its Rules and Bylaws Committee stating that only the four states of Iowa, New Hampshire, Nevada, and South Carolina would be permitted to hold primaries or caucuses before February 5, 2008. In May 2007, the Florida Legislature passed a bill that moved the date of the state's primary to January 29, 2008, setting up a confrontation with the DNC. In response, the DNC ruled that Florida's 185 pledged delegates and 26 superdelegates would not be seated at the Democratic National Convention, or, if seated, would not be able to vote. In October 2007, Democrats from Florida's congressional delegation filed a federal lawsuit against the DNC to force a recognition of its delegates, but the suit was unsuccessful. The presidential candidates promised not to campaign in Florida.

Meanwhile, Michigan moved its primary to January 15, 2008, also in violation of party rules. In October 2007, Obama, Richardson, Biden, and Edwards withdrew their names from the Michigan primary ballot, under pressure from the DNC and voters in Iowa and New Hampshire. Kucinich unsuccessfully sought to remove his name from the ballot, whereas Clinton and Dodd opted to remain on the ballot. In December 2007, the DNC ruled that Michigan's 128 pledged delegates and 29 superdelegates would not count in the nominating contest unless it were held on a later date. The Michigan Democratic party responded with a press release noting that the primary would proceed with Clinton, Dodd, Gravel, and Kucinich on the ballot. Supporters of Biden, Edwards, Richardson, and Obama were urged to vote "uncommitted" instead of writing in their candidates' names because write-in votes for those candidates would not be counted.

None of the top candidates campaigned in Florida or Michigan. The events were described in the media as "beauty contests," and voter turnout in both states was relatively low when compared with record-high turnout in other states. Nevertheless, Clinton claimed wins in Florida and Michigan, and she flew to Fort Lauderdale on the night of the Florida election to thank supporters for what she called a "tremendous victory."

As the primaries continued, various groups tried to negotiate a resolution to the standoff between the DNC and the state parties. The Clinton campaign advocated first for the results to stand and then for a new round of voting to take place in Michigan and Florida, while the Obama campaign deferred the matter to the DNC, while expressing a wish that the delegations be seated in some form. On all sides, Democrats worried that a failure to resolve the problem could lead to a rules or credential fight at the convention and low Democratic turnout in the general election in November.

On May 31, 2008, the DNC Rules and Bylaws Committee voted unanimously (27–0) to restore half-votes to all the Florida delegates, including superdelegates. The Michigan delegates were also given half-votes, with 69 delegates pledged to Hillary Clinton and 59 to Barack Obama; this proposed change passing by 19–8.

Details		Restored votes to the convention			Pledged delegate vote count						
Details		Restored votes to the convention			Awarded by the DNC			Change notes	Final estimate		
Date	Election link	Pledged	Super	Total	Obama	Clinton	Edwards	Change notes	Obama	Clinton	Edwards
January 15	Michigan primary	128	29	157	59	69	0		59	69	0
January 29	Florida primary	185	26	211	67	105	13		67	105	13
–	Total	313	55	368	126	174	13		126	174	13
–	To date	448	93	543	189	222	39		214	220	16

=== Super Tuesday ===
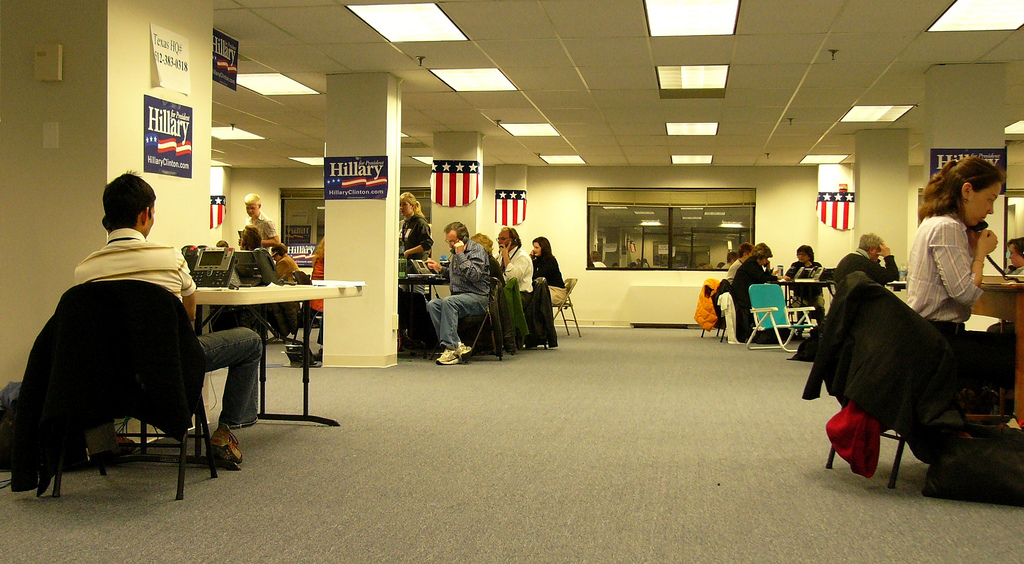
Staffers make phone calls to voters from Clinton's national campaign headquarters.

Traditionally, the Tuesday on which the greatest number of states hold primary elections is known as Super Tuesday. In 2007, many states moved their primaries or caucuses to early in the year so they could have greater influence over the race. As February 5 was the earliest date to be allowed by the Democratic National Committee, 23 states and territories moved their elections to that date. 2008's Super Tuesday became the date of the nation's first quasi-national primary. It was dubbed "Super Duper Tuesday" or "Tsunami Tuesday," among other names.

After Obama's win in the South Carolina primaries on January 26, he received high-profile endorsements from Caroline Kennedy, daughter of former President John F. Kennedy, as well as Senator Ted Kennedy, the former President's brother. Ted Kennedy's endorsement was considered "the biggest Democratic endorsement [that] Obama could possibly get short of Bill Clinton or Al Gore." On January 31, Obama and Clinton met for the first time in a one-on-one debate, and they struck a friendly tone. Obama surged nationally in the polls and held campaign rallies that drew audiences of over 15,000 people in several states.

A total of 1,681 pledged delegate votes were at stake in the states that voted on February 5. The following table shows the pledged delegate votes awarded in the Super Tuesday states.

Details	Delegate votes to the convention			Pledged delegate vote count				
Details	Delegate votes to the convention			Election result		Change notes	Final estimate	
Election link	Pledged	Super	Total	Obama	Clinton	Change notes	Obama	Clinton
Alabama primary	52	8	60	27	25		27	25
Alaska caucuses	13	4	17	9	4		10	3
American Samoa caucuses	3	6	9	1	2		1	2
Arizona primary	56	11	67	25	31		25	31
Arkansas primary	35	12	47	8	27		8	27
California primary	370	71	441	166	204		166	204
Colorado caucuses	55	15	70	35	20		36	19
Connecticut primary	48	12	60	26	22		26	22
Delaware primary	15	8	23	9	6		9	6
Georgia primary	87	15	102	60	27		60	27
Idaho caucuses	18	5	23	15	3		15	3
Illinois primary	153	31	184	104	49		104	49
Kansas caucuses	32	9	41	23	9		23	9
Massachusetts primary	93	28	121	38	55		38	55
Minnesota caucuses	72	16	88	48	24		48	24
Missouri primary	72	16	88	36	36		36	36
New Jersey primary	107	20	127	48	59		48	59
New Mexico primary	26	12	38	12	14		12	14
New York primary	232	49	281	93	139		93	139
North Dakota caucuses	13	8	21	8	5		8	5
Oklahoma primary	38	10	48	14	24		14	24
Tennessee primary	68	17	85	28	40		28	40
Utah primary	23	6	29	14	9		14	9
Total	1,681	390	2,071	847	834		849	832
To date	2,129	483	2,614	1,036	1,056		1,063	1,052

On election night, both Obama and Clinton claimed victories. In the popular vote, Obama won 13 states and territories to Clinton's 10. This included the states of Idaho and Georgia, where Obama won by very wide margins. His wins in Connecticut and Missouri were considered upsets. However, Clinton won the large electoral prizes of California and Massachusetts, where some analysts had expected the Kennedy endorsements might carry Obama to the victory. Although Obama gained significant ground from where he was polling in mid-January, it was not enough to close the gap in those states. In exit polls, Obama gained some overwhelming support of African-American voters, and he strengthened his base among college-educated voters and voters younger than the age of 45. Clinton found significant support among white women, Latinos, and voters over age 65. Obama ran strongest in caucus states, Rocky Mountain states, Southern states and Midwestern states. Clinton ran strongest in the Northeastern states, Southwestern states, and states bordering Arkansas, where she served as first lady while her husband served as that state's governor. When the delegate counting was finished, Obama won an estimated 847 pledged delegates to Clinton's 834. Early in the primary season, many observers had predicted that the nomination would be over after Super Tuesday, but the general verdict on election night was that the candidates had drawn to a virtual tie and that the race for the Democratic presidential nomination would not likely be settled for at least a month.

=== Mid-February contests ===
In the following week, it became clear that a tie on Super Tuesday would leave Obama better positioned for the upcoming contests in February, where the demographics of several large states seemed to favor him. The day after Super Tuesday, February 6, Clinton announced that she had personally lent her campaign $5 million in January. The news came as a surprise and set off another round of news stories about Clinton donors and supporters concerned about the campaign's strategy. It was particularly striking in light of Obama's announcement that he had raised a record-high $32 million in January, tapping 170,000 new contributors. It became clear that Obama's financial advantage had allowed him to organize and compete in some broader states on Super Tuesday, an advantage that was likely to continue in the upcoming months and weeks. In response, Clinton's supporters raised $6 million online in 36 hours, but Obama's campaign upped the ante, announcing their own total of $7.4 million in 36 hours and starting a new goal of reaching 500,000 new contributors in 2008 by late February.

Details		Delegate votes to the convention			Pledged delegate vote count				
Details		Delegate votes to the convention			Election result		Change notes	Final estimate	
Date	Election link	Pledged	Super	Total	Obama	Clinton	Change notes	Obama	Clinton
February 9	Louisiana primary	56	11	67	33	23		33	23
February 9	Nebraska caucuses	24	7	31	16	8		16	8
February 9	U.S. Virgin Islands convention	3	6	9	3	0		3	0
February 9	Washington caucuses	78	19	97	52	26		52	26
February 10	Maine caucuses	24	8	32	15	9		15	9
February 5–12	Democrats Abroad primary	7	4	11	4½	2½		4½	2½
February 12	D.C. primary	15	24	39	12	3		13	2
February 12	Maryland primary	70	28	98	42	28		43	27
February 12	Virginia primary	83	18	101	54	29		54	29
February 19	Hawaii caucuses	20	9	29	14	6		14	6
February 19	Wisconsin primary	74	18	92	42	32		42	32
–	Total	454	152	606	287½	166½		289½	164½
–	To date	2,583	635	3,220	1,323½	1,222½		1,352½	1,216½

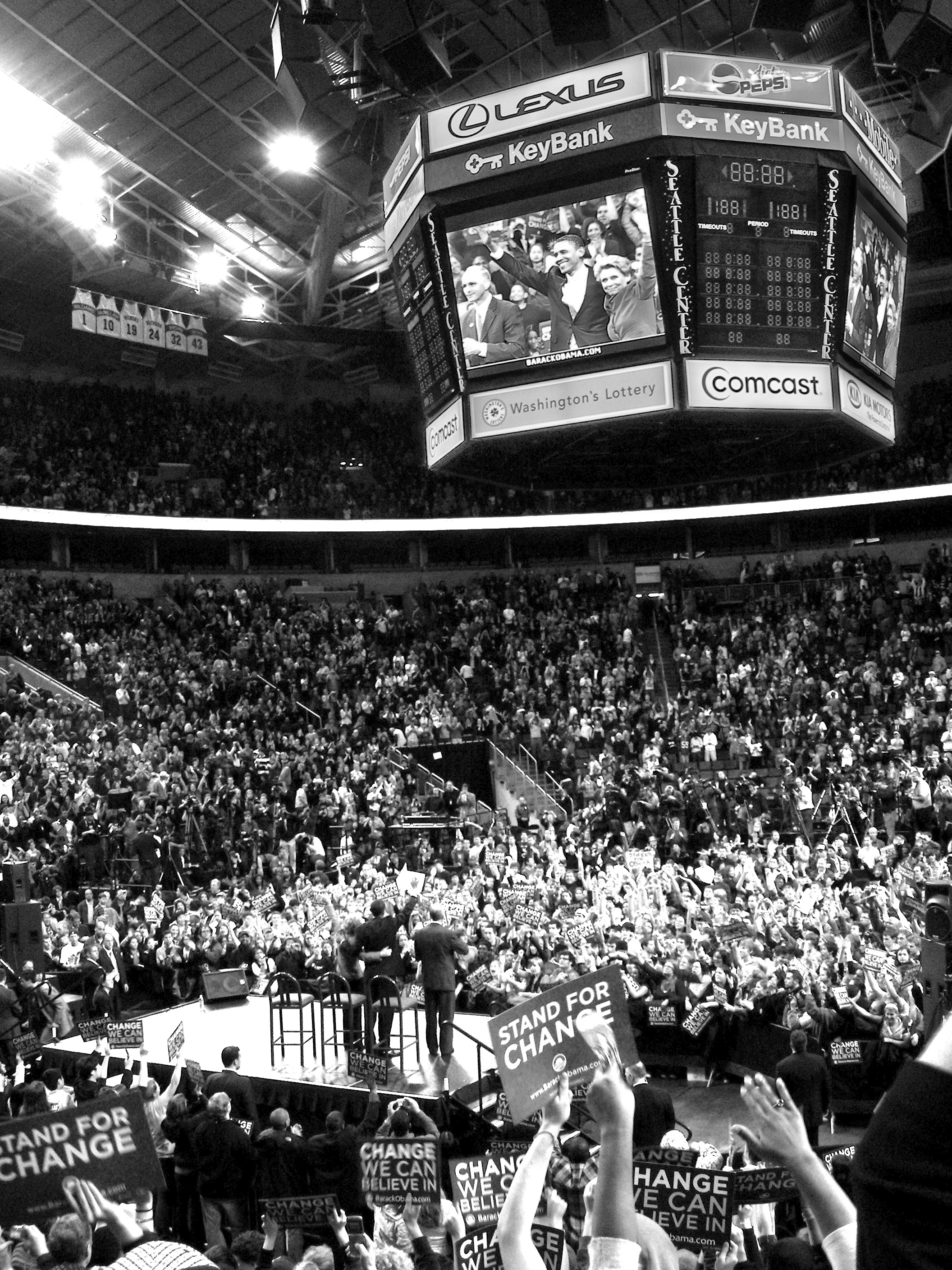
An Obama rally in Seattle, Washington, draws 18,000 people.

As expected, Obama swept the three nominating events on February 9, which were thought to favor him based on the results in similar states that had voted previously. He then scored a convincing win in Maine, where Clinton had hoped to hold her ground. The same day, Clinton's campaign announced that campaign advisor Patti Solis Doyle would resign. Obama's momentum carried throughout the following week, as he scored large delegate gains in the Potomac primaries, taking the lead in the nationwide popular vote, even under the projection most favorable to Clinton, with Florida and Michigan included. NBC News declared him "Mr. Frontrunner" on February 13. Clinton attempted a comeback win in the demographically more favorable state of Wisconsin, but Obama won again by a larger margin than expected. In 11 days, he swept 11 contests and extended his pledged delegate lead by 120. By the end of the month, Obama had 1,192 pledged delegates to Clinton's 1,035. He also began closing the gap in superdelegates, although Clinton still led among superdelegates by 240–191. Clinton's campaign tried to downplay the results of the February contests, and the candidate refused to acknowledge the losses in her speeches on election nights. Her advisers acknowledged that she would need big wins in the upcoming states to turn the race around.

=== March ===
With four states and 370 delegates at stake, March 4 was dubbed "Mini-Super Tuesday" or "Super Tuesday II". Just as Obama had been favored in the mid-February states, Clinton was favored in Ohio, with its high proportion of working-class white voters and older voters, and Texas, with its high proportion of Latino voters. Exit polls in previous states showed that all three groups were a part of Clinton's base. In mid-February, Clinton held a 10-point lead in Texas and a 20-point lead in Ohio in RealClearPolitics polling averages. Her campaign set its sights on the Ohio-Texas "firewall," counting on a clear March 4 win to change the narrative and turn her campaign around for the nomination. Meanwhile, Obama hoped to win one or both states that might be enough to knock Clinton out of the race. By February 25, according to a CNN poll, they were in a statistical dead heat in Texas.

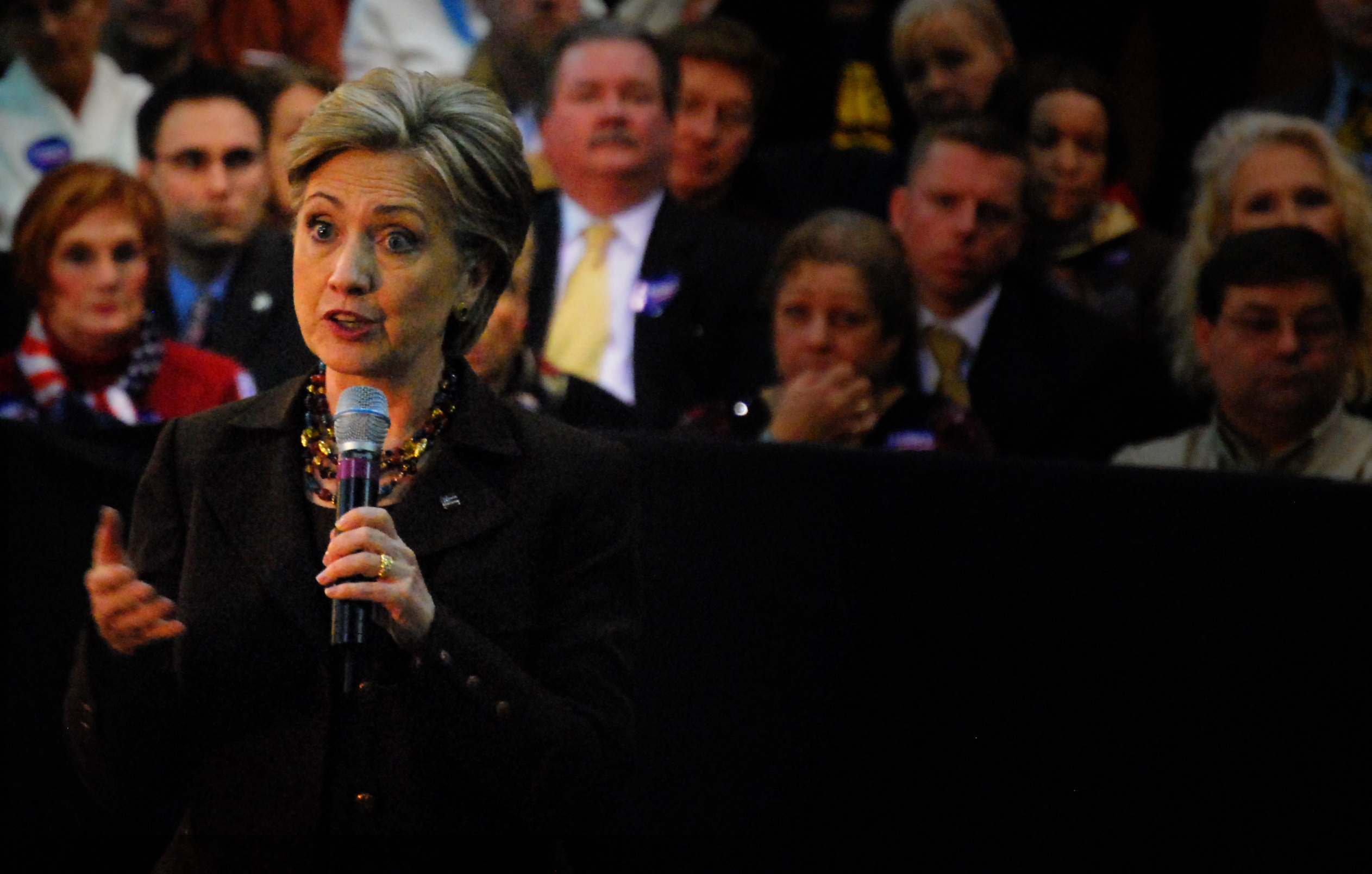
Clinton campaigns in Lorain, Ohio.

In the last week of February, Clinton's campaign seemed to be back on its feet. A Saturday Night Live sketch mocked the media for its supposedly biased coverage in favor of Obama, and Clinton used the sketch to argue that Obama had not received proper scrutiny. The media responded by taking a more critical look at Obama's campaign. Meanwhile, Obama supporter and former fundraiser Tony Rezko went on trial in a political corruption case in Chicago. While Obama was not implicated, questions remained about how forthcoming he had been about his relationship with Rezko. Controversy also erupted when it was reported in the Canadian press that Obama economic advisor Austan Goolsbee had privately offered assurances that Obama's anti-North American Free Trade Agreement rhetoric on the campaign trail was exaggerated. Obama's campaign denied the substance of the report, but their response was muddled by a series of missteps and may have hurt the candidate's standing with Ohio voters. Clinton launched a five-point attack on Obama's qualifications, "unleashing what one Clinton aide called a 'kitchen sink' fusillade," according to The New York Times. Perhaps the most damaging component was a campaign ad that aired in Texas, using the imagery of the White House "red phone" to suggest that Obama would not be prepared to handle a crisis as commander-in-chief when a phone call comes into the White House at 3 a.m. The ad drew significant media attention in the four days before the election. In the general-election campaign, McCain used parts of the ad against Obama.

Details		Delegate votes to the convention			Pledged delegate vote count				
Details		Delegate votes to the convention			Election result		Change notes	Final estimate	
Date	Election link	Pledged	Super	Total	Obama	Clinton	Change notes	Obama	Clinton
March 4	Ohio primary	141	21	162	67	74		67	74
March 4	Rhode Island primary	21	12	33	8	13		8	13
March 4	Texas primary	126	35	228	61	65		61	65
March 4	Texas caucuses	67	35	228	38	29		38	29
March 4	Vermont primary	15	8	23	9	6		9	6
March 8	Wyoming caucuses	12	6	18	7	5		7	5
March 11	Mississippi primary	33	8	41	20	13		20	13
–	Total	415	90	505	210	205		210	205
–	To date	2,998	725	3,725	1,533½	1,427½		1,562½	1,421½

On election night, Clinton scored convincing wins in Ohio and Rhode Island. She narrowly won the Texas primary, while losing the Texas caucus. She pitched her wins that night as a comeback: "For everyone here in Ohio and across America who's ever been counted out but refused to be knocked out, and for everyone who has stumbled but stood right back up, and for everyone who works hard and never gives up, this one is for you."

Obama focused on the "delegate math." He won the total delegate count in Texas, and he stayed close to Clinton on the delegate count in Ohio. "No matter what happens tonight," he said, "we have nearly the same delegate lead that we did this morning, and we are on our way to winning this nomination." In fact, March 4 was the first election day in which Clinton won more delegates than Obama (though the Florida and Michigan primaries would later be honored by seating half of the states' delegations). After winning contests in Wyoming and Mississippi the following week, Obama erased Clinton's March 4 gains. On March 15, he increased his lead by 10 delegates at the Iowa county conventions, when former supporters of withdrawn candidates switched their support to him.

After the March contests, the Democratic race entered a six-week period with no upcoming contests until April 22. As the campaigns settled in for the long haul, advisors for both candidates escalated their rhetoric and stepped up attacks in their daily conference calls. News reports described the tenor as increasingly "rancorous" and "vitriolic."

On March 14, clips of controversial sermons from Obama's former pastor, Jeremiah Wright, resurfaced on YouTube and received heavy airtime on cable news television. Among other things, Wright said, "God damn America for treating our citizens as less than human. God damn America for as long as she acts like she is God and she is supreme." Four days later, Obama responded to the controversy in a 37-minute speech, speaking openly about race and religion in the United States. He denounced Wright's remarks while refusing to condemn the pastor himself, and he attempted to pivot from the immediate circumstances to address the larger theme of "A More Perfect Union." The speech was regarded as "breathtakingly unconventional" in its political strategy and tone, and it received generally positive reviews in the press. The New York Times weighed in with an editorial: "Senator Barack Obama, who has not faced such tests of character this year, faced one on Tuesday. It is hard to imagine how he could have handled it better." Ten days later, the speech had been watched at least 3.4 million times on YouTube.

On March 21, former primary candidate Bill Richardson, who has previously held important posts in the Clinton Administration, endorsed Barack Obama, a move that drew intense criticism from Clinton allies, including James Carville's Eastertime comparison of Richardson with Judas Iscariot. On March 25, Mike Gravel announced that he would leave the Democrats and join the Libertarian Party, entering the race for the 2008 Libertarian presidential nomination the following day.

=== April and beyond ===
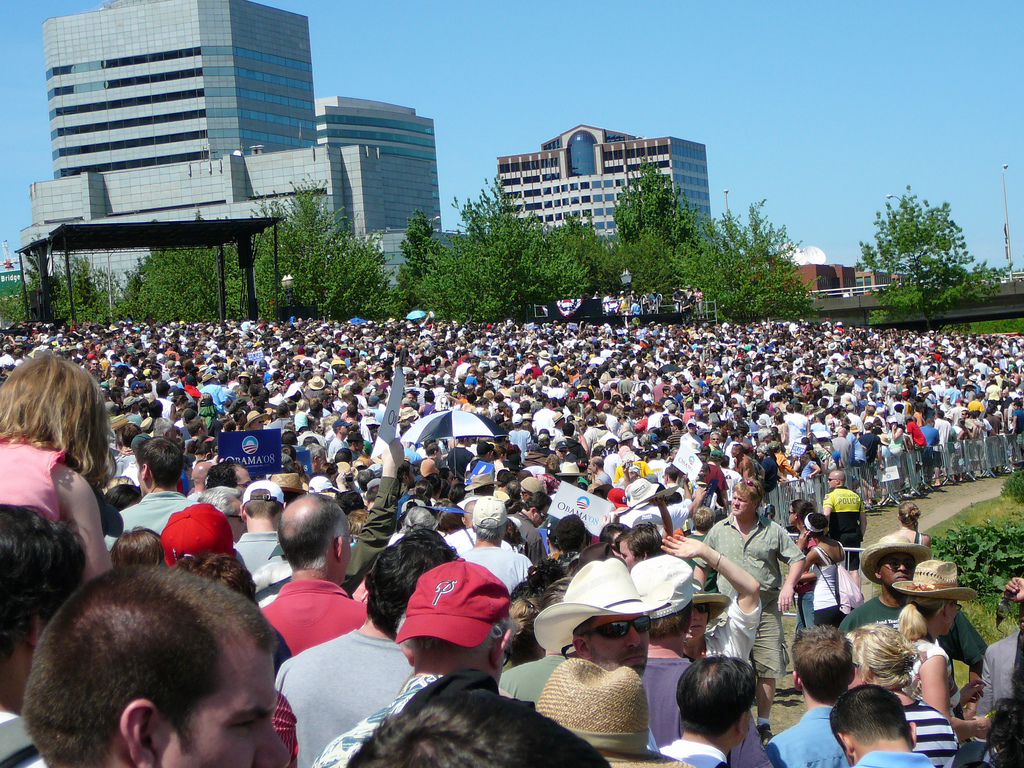
On May 18, Obama speaks to a crowd of 75,000 in Portland, Oregon.

As the race continued to Pennsylvania, Indiana, and North Carolina, many observers concluded that Clinton had little chance to overcome Obama's lead in pledged delegates. Even if she were to succeed in changing the dynamics of the race, there would not be enough pledged delegates remaining for her to catch up under most realistic scenarios. Some analysts believed Clinton could still win the nomination by raising doubts about Obama's electability, fighting for Michigan and Florida delegates to be seated at the convention, and convincing superdelegates to support her despite her expected loss in the pledged delegate vote. However, the window of opportunity for re-votes in Michigan and Florida appeared to close in late March, and House Speaker Nancy Pelosi, chairwoman of the Democratic National Convention, said that it would be harmful to the party if superdelegates were to overturn the result of the pledged delegate vote.

Complicating the equation for Democrats, presidential candidate John McCain clinched the Republican nomination on March 4. With Obama and Clinton engaged in the Democratic primary, McCain was free to define his candidacy for the general election largely unchallenged. Some Democrats expressed concern that Clinton stayed in the campaign through March and April, when they felt she had little chance to win the nomination, but a much greater chance to damage Obama's candidacy in the general election. However, others defended Clinton's right to continue on, arguing that a sustained campaign was good for the Democratic Party and that Clinton still had a realistic shot at the nomination.

On April 22, Clinton scored a convincing win in Pennsylvania. However, on May 6, Obama surprised many observers by winning North Carolina by almost 15 percentage points, effectively erasing Clinton's gains in Pennsylvania. Clinton won by only 1 point in Indiana. With Obama now leading by 164 pledged delegates and with only 217 pledged delegates left to be decided in the remaining contests, many pundits declared that the primary was effectively over. Obama gave an election night speech that looked forward to the general election campaign against McCain. The pace of superdelegate endorsements increased. On May 10, Obama's superdelegate total surpassed Clinton's for the first time in the race, making the math increasingly difficult for a Clinton win.

Clinton vowed to continue campaigning, and won convincingly in primaries in West Virginia on May 13, and Kentucky on May 20 where Appalachian voters strongly preferred her over Obama. However, Obama was able to clear a victory in Oregon on May 20, which allowed him to clinch the majority of pledged delegates. Obama gave a speech in Des Moines, Iowa, the state that propelled his candidacy, in which he stated, "You have put us within reach of the Democratic nomination for president of the United States of America." Clinton advisers said they would appeal to the DNC's Rules & Bylaws Committee to have the Michigan and Florida delegations seated. However, even under the most favorable seating arrangement, she would not have been able to take a lead in pledged delegates and would have had to rely on superdelegates to win the nomination. On May 31, the rules committee accepted the Michigan state party's 69-59 distribution of pledged delegates and restored half votes to Florida's and Michigan's delegations. This resulted in a net gain for Clinton of 24 pledged delegates. Obama remained significantly ahead, with a lead of 137 pledged delegates before the Puerto Rico primary on June 1.

Barack Obama on the night he clinched the Democratic nomination
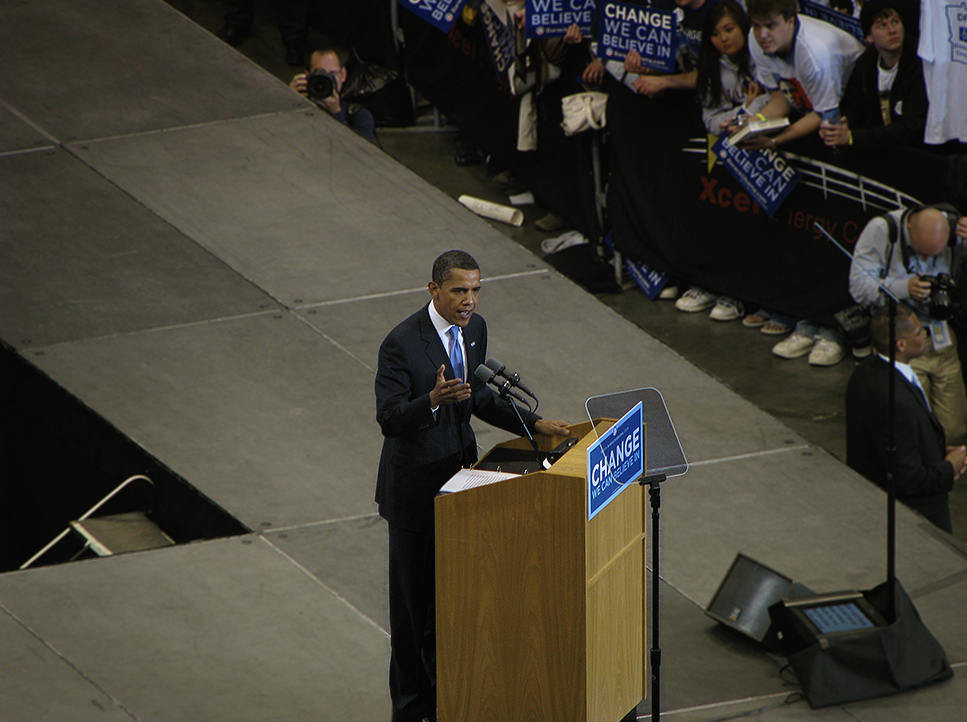
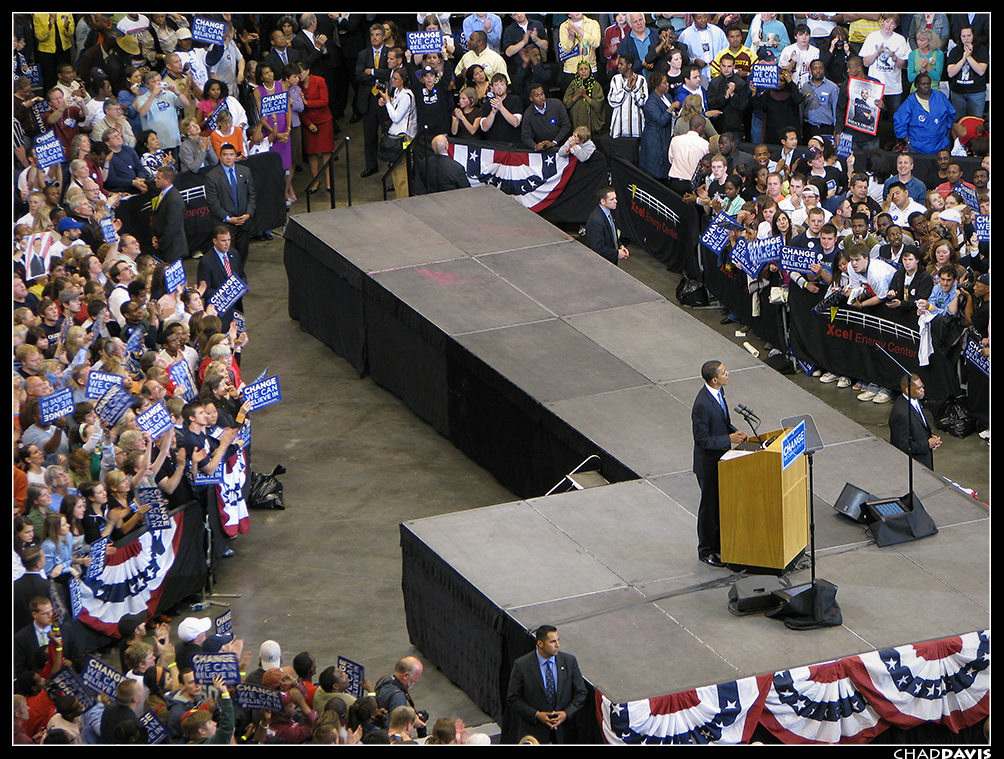
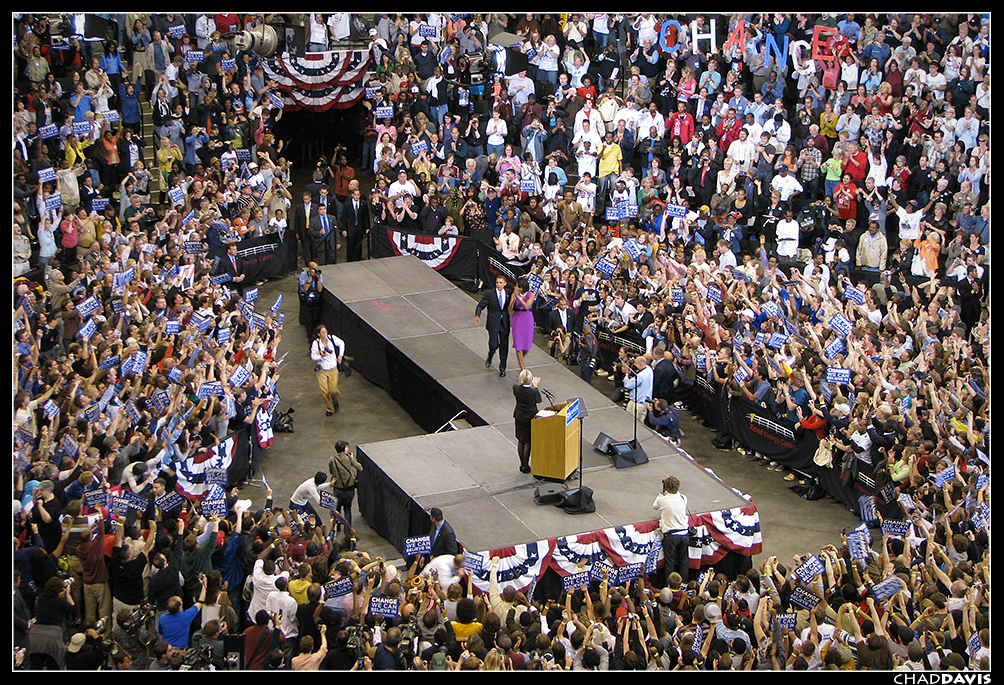
June 3, 2008 at Xcel Energy Center (right with Michelle)

On June 3, the day of the final primaries in South Dakota and Montana, Obama rolled out about sixty superdelegate endorsements. Those endorsements, together with the pledged delegates awarded in the final primaries, put him well over the "magic number" of 2,117 delegate votes necessary for a majority at the Democratic National Convention. By early in the evening, all major news organizations had announced that Obama had clinched the Democratic nomination, and Obama claimed the status of presumptive nominee in a speech in St. Paul, Minnesota. Clinton did not concede the nomination in her election night speech, saying that she would be "making no decisions tonight". On the morning of June 5, Clinton posted on her website an open letter to her supporters, which she also sent by e-mail that day. It announced that on Saturday (June 7) Clinton would endorse Obama's candidacy. During a well received concession speech in Washington DC on Saturday June 7 Clinton endorsed Obama in the following terms: "The way to continue our fight now, to accomplish the goals for which we stand is to take our energy, our passion, our strength, and do all we can to help elect Barack Obama, the next president of the United States. Today, as I suspend my campaign, I congratulate him on the victory he has won and the extraordinary race he has run. I endorse him and throw my full support behind him."

Details		Delegate votes to the convention			Pledged delegate vote count				
Details		Delegate votes to the convention			Election result		Change notes	Final estimate	
Date	Election link	Pledged	Super	Total	Obama	Clinton	Change notes	Obama	Clinton
April 22	Pennsylvania primary	158	29	187	73	85		73	85
May 3	Guam caucuses	4	5	9	2	2		2	2
May 6	Indiana primary	72	13	85	34	38		34	38
May 6	North Carolina primary	115	19	134	67	48		67	48
May 13	West Virginia primary	28	11	39	8	20		8	20
May 20	Kentucky primary	51	9	60	14	37		14	37
May 20	Oregon primary	52	13	65	31	21		31	21
June 1	Puerto Rico primary	55	8	63	17	38		17	38
June 3	Montana primary	16	9	25	9	7		9	7
June 3	South Dakota primary	15	8	23	6	9		6	9
–	At-large vacancies^{*}	–	2	2					
–	Total	566	126	692	261	305		261	305
–	To date	3,564	851	4,417	1,794½	1,732½		1,823½	1,726½

* Two at-large DNC superdelegate seats are vacant, see: History of superdelegate composition changes.

== Results ==
Below are the results for the state primaries and caucuses held by the Democratic Party in 2008 for the presidential primaries. Clinton won one territorial contest, Puerto Rico, whilst Obama won Guam, the US Virgin Islands and American Samoa. He also won the District of Columbia.

Obama
- 20–30%
- 30–40%
- 40–50%
- 50–60%
- 60–70%
- 70–80%
- 80–90%
- 90–100%
- 100%
Clinton
- 30–40%
- 40–50%
- 50–60%
- 60–70%
- 70–80%
- 80–90%
- 90–100%
- 100%
Edwards
- 20–30%
- 30–40%
- 40–50%
Uncommitted
- 40–50%
No results

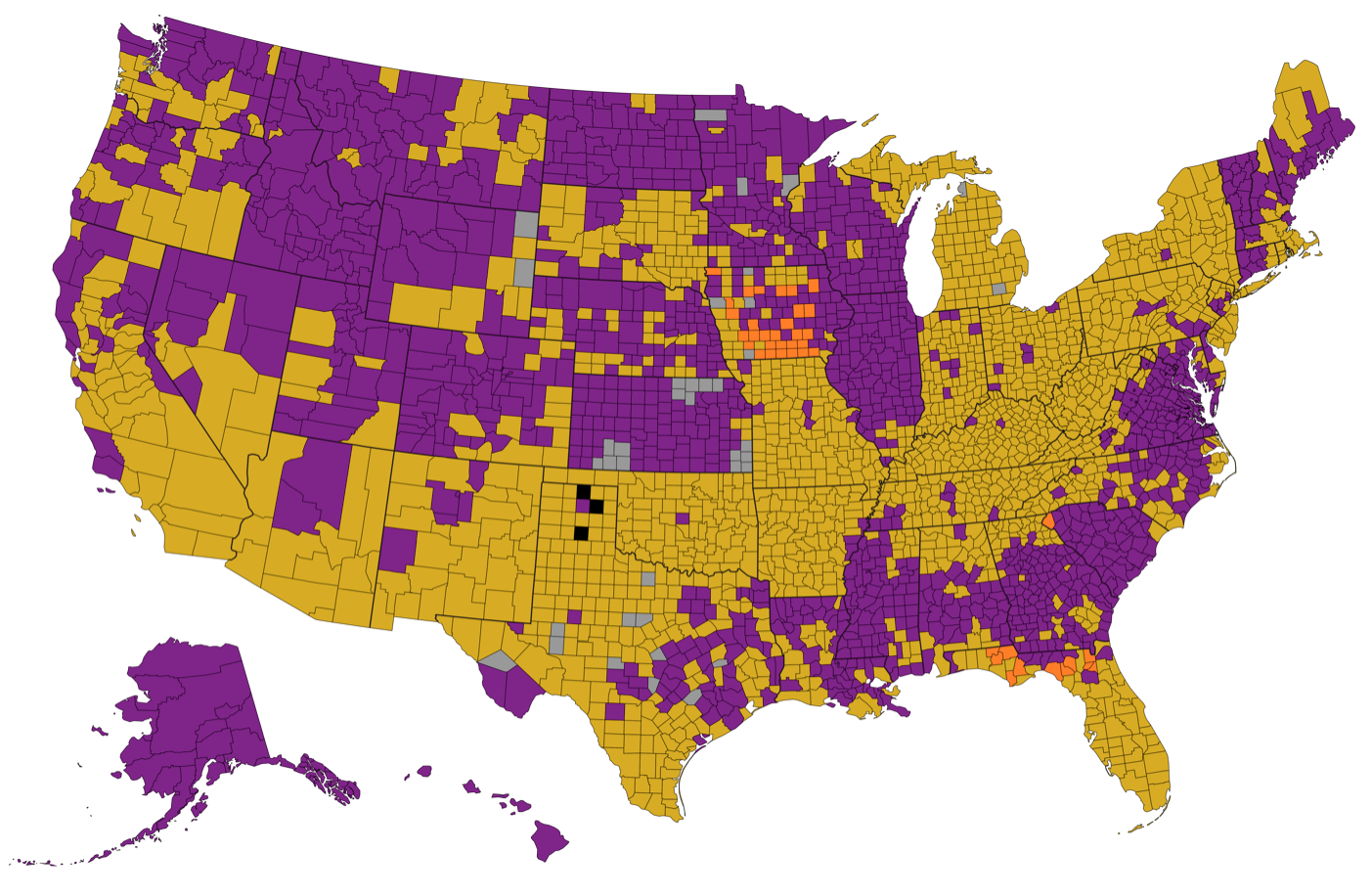

Barack Obama
Hillary Clinton
John Edwards
Tie
No results

N.B: The grey counties in Michigan denote that the counties are uncommitted for either candidate.

== Voter turnout ==
Democratic primary turnout exceeded Republican turnout in most states through March 4 (when John McCain clinched the Republican nomination). The eight exceptions were Alabama, Alaska, McCain's home state of Arizona, Idaho, Nebraska, Utah, as well as the states of Florida and Michigan, where the Democratic primaries had been nullified.

Voter turnout was at historically high levels in the 2008 primaries and caucuses, with many contests setting all-time records for turnout. Voter turnout on Super Tuesday was at 27% of eligible citizens, breaking the previous record of 25.9% set in 1972. Turnout was higher among Democrats than Republicans, with Democratic turnout surpassing Republican turnout even in traditionally red states where the number of registered Democrats is proportionally low. Many states reported high levels of Democratic voter registration in the weeks before primaries. From January 3 through February 5, Democratic turnout exceeded Republican turnout, 19.1 million to 13.1 million.

In the first five weeks of 2008, "voter turnout" was a phrase that was used almost exclusively in connection with the Democratic Party. There were routine stories of precincts running short on ballots, poll hours being extended, and voters packing haunch to paunch inside community centers and local churches. Crowd sizes were described, often with growing awe, as "staggering," "record breaking," or "unprecedented."

— Kent Garber, U.S. News & World Report

The high Democratic turnout was attributed to several factors:

- the compressed primary calendar, which gave voters in more states an opportunity to participate in the nomination
- media interest and voter excitement generated by the first viable African-American and female presidential contenders
- dissatisfaction with Republican presidential candidates
- the early emergence of John McCain as the presumptive nominee of the Republican Party
- open primaries in some states, which allowed Republicans and independent voters to participate in Democratic contests
- dissatisfaction with President George W. Bush and Iraq War policy
- cyclical party realignment

== See also ==
- Fundraising for the 2008 United States presidential election
- Nationwide opinion polling for the 2008 Democratic Party presidential primaries
- Political positions of Barack Obama
- Political positions of Hillary Clinton
- 2008 Republican Party presidential primaries
- Statewide opinion polling for the 2008 Democratic Party presidential primaries
- 2016 Democratic Party presidential primaries
