= 2008 Illinois Democratic presidential primary =

- February 5, 2008

184 Democratic National Convention delegates (153 pledged, 31 unpledged)

Candidate	Barack Obama	Hillary Clinton
Home state	Illinois	New York
Delegate count	104	49
Popular vote	1,318,234	667,930
Percentage	64.66%	32.76%
- Primary results by county Obama: 40–50% 50–60% 60–70% 70–80% Clinton: 40–50% 50–60%

The 2008 Illinois Democratic presidential primary took place on Super Tuesday, February 5, 2008, with 153 delegates at stake. Each of Illinois's 19 congressional districts was proportionally allocated to candidates who had received 15% or more of the vote in that district, totaling 100. Another 53 delegates were also proportionally allocated to candidates who had received 15% or more of the vote statewide. The 153 delegates represented Illinois at the Democratic National Convention in Denver, Colorado. Thirty-two other unpledged delegates, known as superdelegates, also attended the convention and cast their votes as well.

== Polls ==
Polls indicated that then-U.S. Senator Barack Obama was leading then-U.S. Senator Hillary Clinton by double digits in the days before the contest in his home state of Illinois.

== Results ==
2008 Illinois Democratic Presidential Primary Results
Party	Candidate	Votes	Percentage	Delegates
Democratic	Barack Obama	1,318,234	64.66%	104
Democratic	Hillary Clinton	667,930	32.76%	49
Democratic	John Edwards	39,719	1.95%	0
Democratic	Dennis Kucinich	4,234	0.21%	0
Democratic	Joe Biden	3,788	0.19%	0
Democratic	Bill Richardson	3,538	0.17%	0
Democratic	Christopher Dodd	1,171	0.06%	0
Totals		2,038,614	100.00%	153
Voter turnout		%		—

Chicago Public Radio reported on March 13, 2008, that the delegate counts were recalculated and Obama won 106 delegates to 47 for Clinton.

== Analysis ==
It was no surprise that Barack Obama cruised to a landslide victory in Illinois, the state he had represented in the U.S. Senate since 2005. He enjoyed massive support in his state among all demographics. According to exit polls, 57 percent of voters in the Illinois Democratic Primary were white and they opted for Obama 57–41; 24 percent of voters were African American and they, too, backed Obama 93–5; and 17 percent of voters in the primary were Hispanic/Latino and they narrowly backed Obama 50–49. Obama won all age groups but tied Clinton among senior citizens aged 65 and over. He won all voters in the state of all educational attainment levels as well as income/socioeconomic classes. He won all ideological groups and voters from both parties as well as self-identified Independents. Regarding religion, Obama won every major denomination except Roman Catholics, who narrowly backed Clinton 50-48 percent. Obama won Protestants by a margin of 58–38, other Christians 79–19, other religions 82–17, and atheists/agnostics 78–21. Additionally, 69% of young voters (ages 17-29) in this state voted for Obama.

Obama performed extremely well statewide and racked up massive victories in his home city of Chicago as well as its suburbs and the metropolitan area. He also won Northern Illinois as well as the collar counties by substantial victories. Clinton's best performance was in Southern Illinois among the more rural and conservative counties that are majority white, although Obama still won the region as a whole.

== See also ==
- 2008 Illinois Republican presidential primary
- 2008 United States presidential election in Illinois
