= 2008 Democratic Party presidential candidates =

2008 Democratic presidential candidates
- January 14 to June 8, 2008
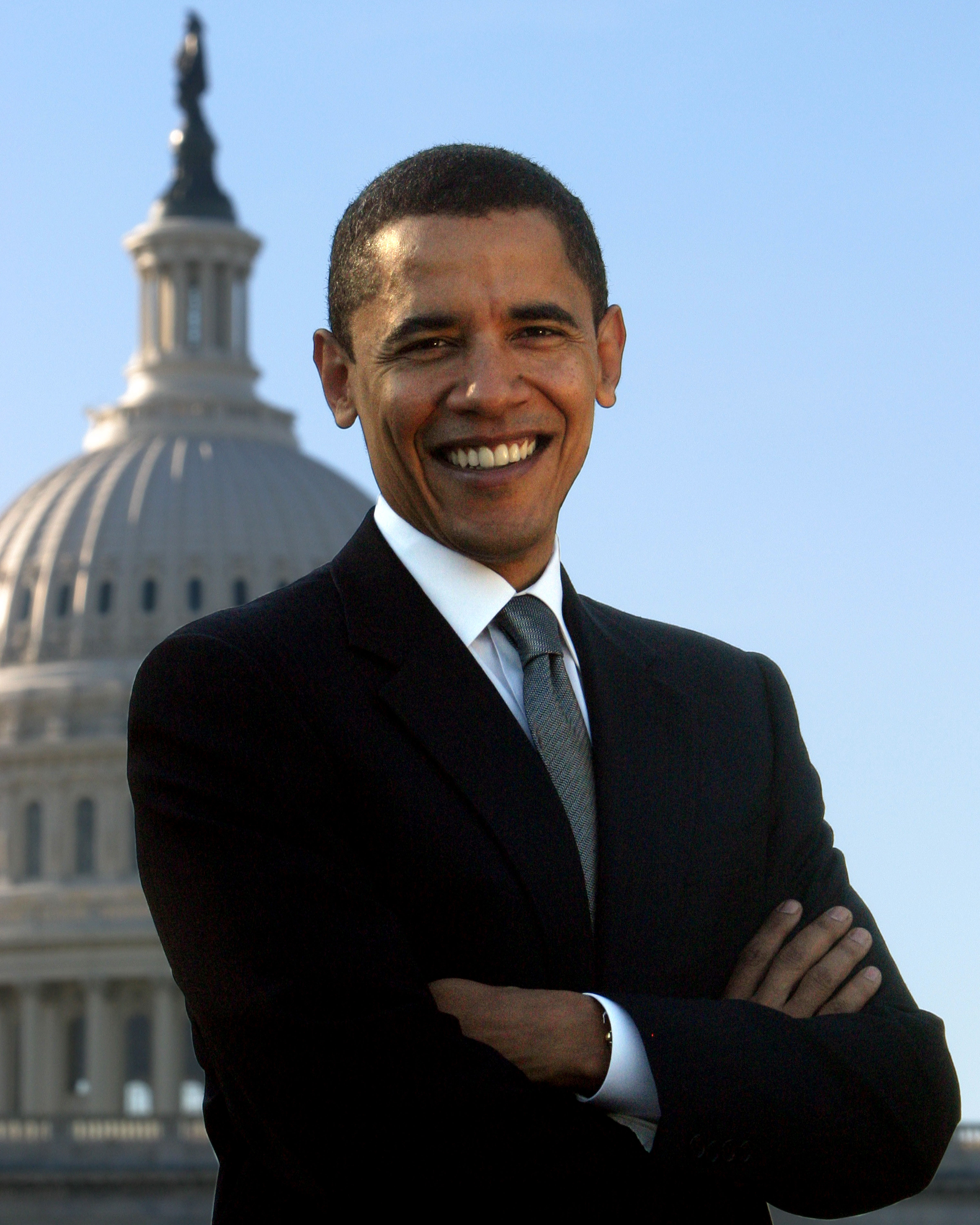

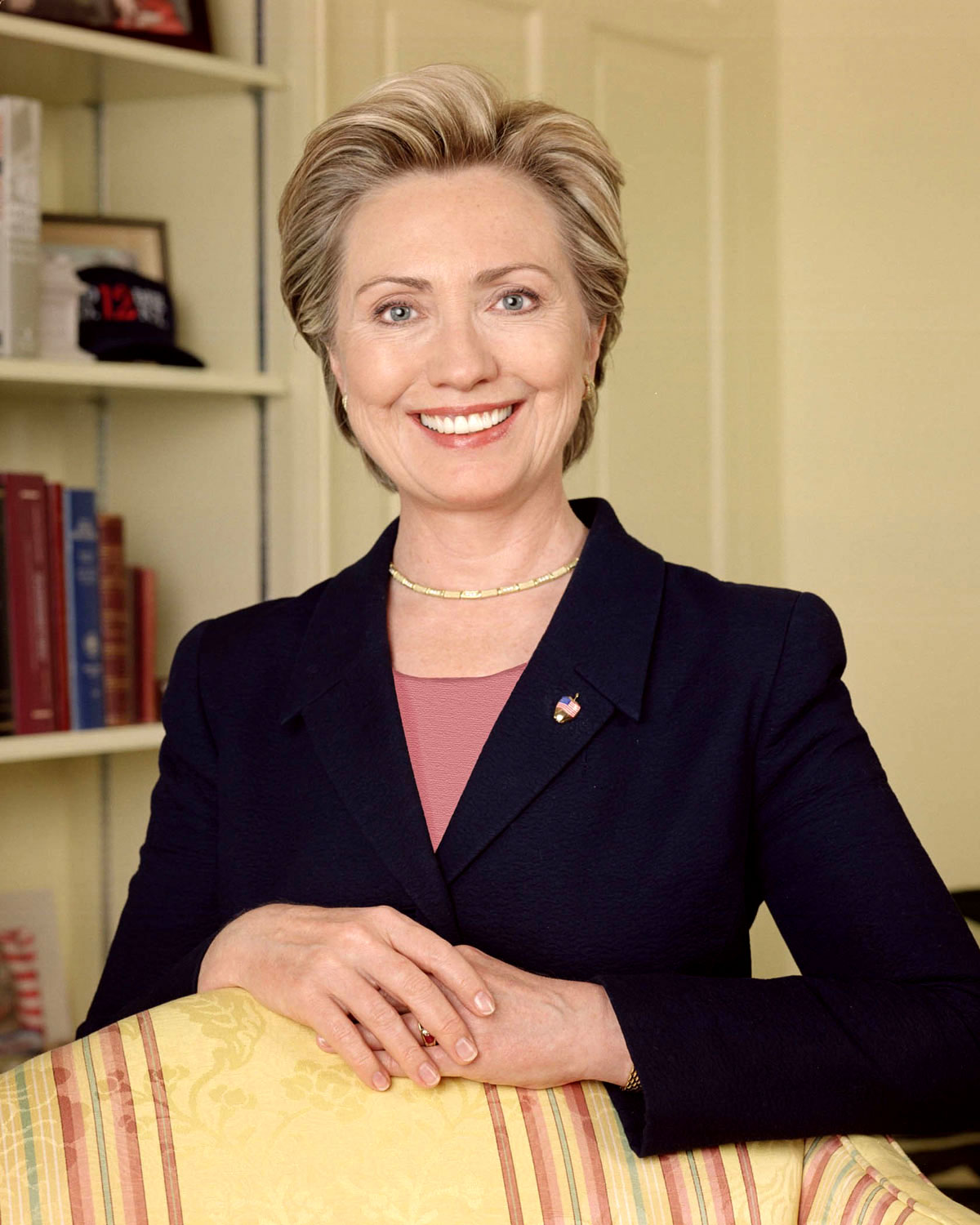
| Nominee | Barack Obama | Hillary Clinton |
| Home state | Illinois | New York |
| Contests won | 29 + D.C | 21 |
| Popular vote | 17,584,692 | 17,857,501 |
- Democratic Primary Results. Purple denotes Obama win, and gold a Clinton win.
Previous Democratic nominee
John Kerry
Democratic nominee
Barack Obama

In the United States 2008 Democratic Party presidential primaries, the total number of delegates was 4050 (797 unpledged super delegates and 3,253 pledged elected delegates). Delegates required for nomination were 2118.

== Nominee ==
| Senator Barack Obama | Main article: Barack Obama 2008 presidential campaign See also: Political positions of Barack Obama Barack Obama, born August 4, 1961, in Honolulu, Hawaii, U.S. Senator from Illinois. A draft Obama movement began with his well-received 2004 Democratic National Convention keynote address. Obama was the featured speaker at Iowa Senator Tom Harkin's annual steak fry, a political event favored by presidential hopefuls in the lead-up to the Iowa Caucus. Obama formally announced his candidacy on February 10, 2007. On June 7, 2008, Obama became the Democratic presumptive presidential nominee when Clinton dropped out of the race. He had 2,025 delegates and was certain to reach the 2,118 delegates required to win the Democratic nomination. By the time of the convention, Obama had 1766.5 elected pledged delegates and the votes of 463 superdelegates. Obama received the official Democratic presidential nomination from the Party's delegates at its 2008 National Convention in Denver, Colorado, held in August. On November 4, Obama was elected as the 44th President of the United States with 53% of the popular vote and 365 electoral votes. He assumed office on January 20, 2009, and is the first African American U.S. president.: President of the United States: 2009–2017; U.S. Senator from Illinois: 2005–2008; Illinois State Senator: 1996–2004 |

== Withdrew during the primary elections ==
Candidates who withdrew during the primaries.
| Senator Joe Biden | Main article: Joe Biden 2008 presidential campaign See also: Political positions of Joe Biden Joe Biden, born November 20, 1942, in Scranton, Pennsylvania, is a former U.S. Senator from Delaware who was a candidate for the Democratic presidential nomination in 1988, although he ceased active campaigning in 1987, before the first primaries. Biden first hinted that he might run in 2008 in a December 8, 2004, radio interview with host Don Imus, saying: "I'm going to proceed as if I'm going to run." Biden had repeatedly stated his intention to run, and did so as early as March 21, 2006. Biden's Federal Leadership PAC is "Unite Our States", which tracks Biden's public appearances and policy positions. On January 7, 2007, when asked by Tim Russert on Meet the Press, "Are you running for president?" he responded, "I am running for president." He also said he planned to create an exploratory committee by the end of the month. On January 31, 2007, he officially signed the papers with the FEC to run for president. He dropped out of the race on January 3, 2008, after a poor performance in the Iowa caucus. On June 22, Biden endorsed Barack Obama, and he was chosen on August 23, 2008, as Obama's running mate. On November 4, the Obama–Biden ticket defeated John McCain and his running mate Sarah Palin to win the presidential election. Thus, Biden was elected as the 47th Vice President of the United States. He assumed the office of the vice presidency on January 20, 2009, and his term ended on January 20, 2017. Twelve years later, Biden would run another presidential campaign for the 2020 presidential election in which he defeated incumbent president Donald J. Trump. He was sworn in as the 46th President of the United States on January 20, 2021.: President of the United States, 2021–2025; Vice President of the United States under Barack Obama, 2009–2017; U.S. Senator from Delaware: 1973–2009 |
| Senator Hillary Rodham Clinton | Main article: Hillary Clinton 2008 presidential campaign See also: Political positions of Hillary Rodham Clinton Hillary Clinton, born October 26, 1947, in Illinois, is a former U.S. Senator from New York and former First Lady of the United States. Clinton announced the formation of her exploratory committee on January 20, 2007, with a post on her website. She delivered several speeches intended to reach out to moderates, according to analysts. She also held fundraising meetings, including meeting with women from Massachusetts, a key constituency of potential rival and 2004 nominee John Kerry; however, these activities were consistent with the lead up to a campaign for re-election to her Senate seat in 2006. Clinton announced on January 20, 2007, that she would run in 2008 (the same day she announced the formation of an exploratory committee). The clear front-runner, she was widely expected to clinch the nomination early, but as of June 3, 2008, she had 1,923 delegates, 231 behind Barack Obama and 195 short of the 2,118 required to win the Democratic nomination. She withdrew from the race and endorsed Barack Obama, as the presumptive nominee, on June 7. Clinton was nominated and subsequently assumed the office of Secretary of State in the Obama administration. Eight years later, Clinton would run another presidential campaign for the 2016 presidential election in which she was defeated by businessman Donald J. Trump.: Secretary of State under Barack Obama 2009–2013; United States Senator from New York: 2001–2009; First Lady of the United States (1993–2001); Chairman of the board, Legal Services Corporation (Carter and Reagan administrations): 1977–1982; Legal Counsel, House Judiciary Committee: 1974 |
| Former Senator John Edwards | Main article: John Edwards 2008 presidential campaign See also: Political positions of John Edwards John Edwards, born June 10, 1953, in South Carolina, is a former U.S. Senator from North Carolina. As a 2004 presidential candidate, Edwards was famed for his populist message in his "Two Americas" speech and also for his optimistic, positive attitude. This was evidenced by his refusal to attack his opponents. Edwards served as John Kerry's running mate in the 2004 presidential election as the vice presidential nominee. In the primaries, Sen. Edwards had strong come-from-behind showings in the crucial states of Iowa, Oklahoma, Virginia, Tennessee, Wisconsin, and Georgia. On February 5, 2005, Edwards spoke at the New Hampshire Democratic Party's fundraising dinner. On August 18, 2005, Edwards traveled to Waterloo, Iowa, to deliver an address to the Iowa AFL–CIO, a potential key supporter in the Iowa caucuses. On December 26, 2006, Edwards formally announced his candidacy. On January 30, 2008, Edwards withdrew from the race, and endorsed Barack Obama.: Director of the Center on Poverty, Work, and Opportunity at the University of North Carolina at Chapel Hill: 2005–2006; U.S. Senator from North Carolina: 1999–2005 |
| Senator Christopher Dodd | Main article: Chris Dodd 2008 presidential campaign See also: Political positions of Chris Dodd Christopher Dodd, born May 27, 1944, in Willimantic, Connecticut, is a five-term U.S. Senator from that state. Dodd was reported to be a likely contender for the Democratic vice president slot on John Kerry's ticket in 2004. In May 2006, Dodd said he has "decided to do all the things that are necessary to prepare to seek the presidency in 2008", including hiring staff, raising money and traveling around the country in the next few months to enlist support. On January 11, 2007, Dodd announced his presidential candidacy on the "Imus in the Morning" radio show with Don Imus. As a result of unpromising results in the Iowa Caucus on January 3, 2008, Dodd dropped out of the race for the presidency, and endorsed Barack Obama.: U.S. Senator from Connecticut: 1981–2011; U.S. Representative from the Connecticut's 2nd congressional district: 1975–1981 |
| Former Senator Mike Gravel | Main article: Mike Gravel 2008 presidential campaign See also: Political positions of Mike Gravel Maurice Robert "Mike" Gravel, born May 13, 1930, in Massachusetts, is a former Democratic United States Senator from Alaska, who served two terms from 1969 to 1981. Born and raised in Springfield, Massachusetts to French-Canadian immigrant parents, Gravel served in the United States Army in West Germany and graduated from Columbia University. He moved to Alaska in the late 1950s, becoming a real estate developer and entering politics. He served in the Alaska House of Representatives from 1963 to 1966 and became its Speaker of the House. Gravel was elected to the United States Senate in 1968. He declared his candidacy for the presidency in a speech to the National Press Club on April 17, 2006. On March 25, 2008, Gravel withdrew from the race, and switched his party affiliation to the Libertarian Party. He refused to endorse either Barack Obama or Hillary Clinton for president, but endorsed Green Party candidate Jesse Johnson. Gravel then ran for the Libertarian party nomination for president, but lost the nomination to former Republican Congressman Bob Barr of Georgia.: U.S. Senator from Alaska: 1969–1981 |
| Representative Dennis Kucinich | Main article: Dennis Kucinich 2008 presidential campaign See also: Political positions of Dennis Kucinich Dennis Kucinich, born October 8, 1946, in Cleveland, Ohio, is a Congressman for Ohio, former Mayor of Cleveland, and 2004 Democratic presidential candidate. Dennis Kucinich is known by many as "The Peace Candidate", having received the 2003 Gandhi Peace Award. Kucinich opposed the war in Iraq and the Patriot Act. Under Kucinich's plan, United Nations peace-keepers would go to Iraq if the Iraqi citizens desire their presence. The Congressman re-introduced legislation to create a United States Department of Peace via HR 808 on February 5, 2007. He is currently campaigning to end the war in Iraq by cutting off funding. He is in support of peaceful diplomatic relations with Iran, and all nations. Kucinich has received many awards praising his courage and work for peace. On December 12, 2006, Kucinich announced his candidacy at an event at Cleveland's City Hall. He withdrew from the race on January 24, 2008. On August 26, he endorsed the Obama-Biden ticket.: U.S. Representative from Ohio's 10th congressional district: 1997–2013; Mayor of Cleveland: 1978–1979 |
| Governor Bill Richardson | Main article: Bill Richardson 2008 presidential campaign See also: Political positions of Bill Richardson Bill Richardson, born November 15, 1947, in Pasadena, California, is Governor of New Mexico, former U.S. ambassador to the United Nations, Secretary of Energy and former Representative for New Mexico. After reportedly informing party leaders in February 2005 of his intention to run for president, on December 7, 2006, Richardson said "I am running" during his response to a prospective question about the 2008 presidential election by Fox News, but he later retracted the decision and said he would make an official decision by January. On May 21, 2007, he officially declared his candidacy. On January 9, 2008, he withdrew from the race and went on to endorse Barack Obama.: Governor of New Mexico: 2003–2011; United States Secretary of Energy: 1998–2001; United States Ambassador to the United Nations: 1997–1998; U.S. Representative from the New Mexico's 3rd congressional district: 1983–1997 |

== Withdrew before primary elections ==
Candidates who dropped out before the Iowa Caucuses
| Senator Evan Bayh | Main article: Evan Bayh 2008 presidential campaign Evan Bayh, born December 26, 1955, Indiana, former two-term Governor and a two-term U.S. Senator from that state. In February 2005, Bayh renamed his Federal Leadership PAC the All America PAC and hired a new veteran staff with experience on the 2004 campaigns of John Kerry and Wesley Clark for president and Tom Daschle for senate. On December 1, 2006, he announced he was running for president and formed a presidential exploratory committee. He announced on December 16, 2006, that he would not seek the Democratic nomination for president, and then endorsed Senator Hillary Clinton. After Clinton withdrew from the race, Bayh endorsed Senator Barack Obama.: U.S. Senator from Indiana: 1999–2011; Governor of Indiana: 1989–1997; Indiana Secretary of State: 1987–1989 |
| Former governor Tom Vilsack | Main article: Tom Vilsack 2008 presidential campaign Tom Vilsack, born December 13, 1950, in Pittsburgh, Pennsylvania, is a former governor of Iowa and chairman of the Democratic Leadership Council. Many suspected Vilsack was high on the list of potential running mates for John Kerry in the 2004 Presidential Election. In 2005, Vilsack established Heartland PAC, a political action committee aimed at electing Democratic Governors and other statewide candidates. Unlike the PACs of potential candidates, Heartland PAC is not a federal PAC and can not contribute to federal candidates. He filed papers with the Federal Election Commission (FEC) to run for president on November 9, 2006. He dropped out of the race on February 23, 2007, citing fundraising woes. He subsequently endorsed Hillary Clinton. After Clinton had withdrawn from the race, Vilsack threw his support behind Barack Obama. Vilsack was nominated and subsequently assumed the office of Secretary of Agriculture in the Obama administration.: United States Secretary of Agriculture: 2009–2017, 2021–2025; Governor of Iowa: 1999–2007 |

== Other candidates ==
The following people filed with the Federal Election Commission (FEC):

- Willie Carter
- Randy Crow
- Phil Epstein
- Michael Forrester
- Henry Hewes
- D.R. Hunter
- Keith Russell Judd
- Karl Krueger
- Frank Lynch
- Lee L. Mercer Jr.
- Grover Cleveland Mullins
- Larry Reed

== Declined to run for party nomination ==
Speculated candidates who decided against running
| Governor Phil Bredesen | Phil Bredesen (born November 21, 1943) is an American politician and businessman who served as the 48th Governor of Tennessee from 2003 to 2011. Viewed by many as a moderate Democrat based in the South, Bredesen was touted as a potential presidential candidate in 2008, but he said he had no interest in joining the wide field of Democrats seeking the nomination. He did not comment on joining a Democratic ticket as Vice President of the United States. On June 4, 2008, Bredesen endorsed Barack Obama for U.S. president.: Governor of Tennessee 2003–2011 |
| General Wesley Clark (Ret.) | Wesley Clark, born December 23, 1944, in Illinois, from Arkansas, a Vietnam War veteran, a retired United States Army four-star general and former Supreme Allied Commander of NATO. He graduated first in his class from West Point. Clark is traveling widely through his Federal Leadership PAC WesPAC, and is a commentator on MSNBC, while grassroots campaigns for Clark have become active on the internet. Clark was a 2004 presidential candidate, narrowly winning the Oklahoma primary. During a January 17, 2007, speech given to a local UAW group in Alabama and posted on YouTube, Clark stated "when I run, I'll be the national security candidate." He endorsed Senator Hillary Clinton on September 15, 2007. After her concession, Clark endorsed Senator Barack Obama. |
| Tom Daschle, former Senate Majority Leader | Tom Daschle, born December 9, 1947, in South Dakota, former U.S. Senator from that state. He set up a new political action committee and planned a Jefferson-Jackson Day speech in the politically pivotal state of Iowa. Daschle has transferred $500,000 into the new Federal Leadership PAC, New Leadership for America. In July 2005, Daschle said he was not planning a rematch against his successor John Thune in 2010, and he told the Sioux Falls Argus Leader newspaper that he was seriously considering a run and would not "rule out the possibility of an official announcement in the near future." However, on December 2, 2006, Daschle announced he would not run for president in 2008, and threw his support behind Barack Obama.: U.S. Senator from South Dakota: 1987–2005 (Senate Minority Leader: 1995–2001 & 2003–2005, Majority Leader: 2001–2003); South Dakota's At-Large congressional district: 1979–1987 |
| Howard Dean, former governor of Vermont | Howard Dean, born November 17, 1947, in New York, former governor of Vermont. Howard Dean was the DNC Chairman from 2005 to 2009, and was a candidate for the nomination in 2004. Dean said if he won the DNC Chairmanship he would not run for president and, since he won, has often repeated this.: Governor of Vermont: 1991–2003 |
| Senator Russ Feingold | Russ Feingold, born March 2, 1953, in Wisconsin, U.S. Senator from that state. Announced to a meeting of the Tiger Bay Club of Volusia County, Florida, in January 2005 that he was considering a run for the nomination, and would decide after "going around the country" to campaign for fellow Democrats running for other offices. His Federal Leadership PAC is the Progressive Patriots Fund, which financed his travels around the country. In early March 2005, his Senate campaign registered the domain name for the website www.russfeingold08.com as well as the .org and .net versions. Later that month, he took a listening trip to Alabama. In early April 2005, Feingold announced that he would be divorcing his second wife, a move which some analysts believed could diminish his chances of winning the presidential nomination. On August 17, 2005, Feingold became the first U.S. Senator to publicly support a firm date for withdrawal from the Iraq War, suggesting December 31, 2006, as a reasonable date. Feingold's stance was generally criticized by other Democratic senators, including Biden and Clinton. In December 2005, he led the Senate campaign against the renewal of the Patriot Act; following his anti-war and bi-partisan rule of law positions in the 2006 Congressional Elections, Feingold commented that the legislative victory "pushes me in both directions," and he "could make a decision on a presidential run before the end of the year". However, on November 12, 2006, Feingold ruled out a 2008 presidential candidacy, noting that he was willing to consider an offer from the eventual nominee for the vice presidency. He stated on February 22 that he had voted for Barack Obama in his state's primary election.: U.S. Senator from Wisconsin: 1993–2011 |
| Al Gore, former Vice President of the United States | Al Gore, born March 31, 1948, in Washington, D.C., is the former U.S. Vice President, and was the 2000 Democratic nominee, winning the popular vote. Gore is not a declared candidate in the 2008 presidential Election. However, he has not rejected the possibility of future involvement in politics. The prospect of a Gore candidacy was thus a topic of public discussion and speculation. There were also grassroots draft campaigns. A grassroots group in New Hampshire considered a write-in campaign for the New Hampshire primary on 8 January 2008. The campaign was halted, however. Previous grassroot groups in California and New York attempted to convince him to run. There were also draft campaigns via websites. The release of An Inconvenient Truth in 2006 increased Gore's popularity among progressives. After it was nominated for an Academy Award, Donna Brazile, Gore's campaign chairwoman from the 2000 campaign stated during a speech on January 31, 2007, at Moravian College in Bethlehem, Pennsylvania that, "Wait till Oscar night, I tell people: 'I'm dating. I haven't fallen in love yet. On Oscar night, if Al Gore has slimmed down 25 or 30 pounds, Lord knows.'" The meaning of these remarks became clearer when on award night, while in attendance and acting as a presenter for an award, Gore began a speech that seemed to be leading up to an announcement that he would run for president. However, background music drowned him out and he was escorted offstage, implying it was a rehearsed gag. A nationwide Gallup poll of 485 Democrats and Democratic leaners in mid-November 2007 showed Gore receiving 17% of the votes in a hypothetical Democratic primary, second to Hillary Clinton, tied with Barack Obama, and ahead of John Edwards. A previous 29 June 2007 article in The Guardian cited a poll conducted "in New Hampshire by 7News and Suffolk University" that found that if Gore "were to seek the Democratic nomination, 29% of Mrs. Clinton's backers would switch their support to him ... when defections from other candidates are factored in, the man who controversially lost to Mr. Bush in the 2000 Election takes command of the field, with 32% support." An even earlier April 2007 Quinnipiac University Polling Institute poll of 504 registered Democrats in New Jersey showed Gore receiving 12% of the votes in a hypothetical Democratic primary, in third place behind Hillary Clinton and Barack Obama. However, all of the polls which indicated that Al Gore would not be the leading Democratic candidate were all conducted before his Nobel Prize. The US has never had a presidential candidate who has already won a Nobel Prize. On June 16, Gore endorsed Barack Obama.: Vice-President of the United States: 1993–2001; U.S. Senator from Tennessee: 1985–1993; U.S. Representative from Tennessee's 6th congressional district: 1983–1985; U.S. Representative from Tennessee's 4th congressional district: 1977–1983 |
| Senator John Kerry | John Kerry, born December 11, 1943, in Denver, Colorado, is the U.S. Senator from Massachusetts, and the 2004 Democratic presidential nominee. On March 1, 2005, Kerry created a new Federal Leadership PAC named Keeping America's Promise. Dan Payne, a Democratic strategist, told The Washington Post that "This is the kind of thing he has to do" in order to run for president again in 2008. Through Keeping America's Promise, Kerry claimed to have raised or given away over $14 million to nearly 300 progressive candidates, committees or causes. Kerry told CNN, with respect to a run in 2008, "it's crazy to be thinking about it now" but went on to say that "I'll make my judgment when the time comes and I don't care what history says." However, there was a controversy on October 30, 2006, over a comment Kerry made on the war in Iraq during a speech at Pasadena City College. Kerry claimed the incident would have little bearing on 2008 and that he would make a decision in early 2007. On January 24, 2007, Kerry announced that he would not seek the Democratic nomination for the presidency in 2008. Kerry and his JohnKerry.com e-mail list supported Al Gore's house parties across the United States to spread information about global warming. In a letter e-mailed from JohnKerry.com, Kerry stated: "When strong leaders like Al Gore step forward to educate and organize people around vitally important issues, they deserve our full support." Kerry then endorsed Senator Barack Obama.: United States Special Presidential Envoy for Climate: 2021–2024; U.S. Senator from Massachusetts: 1985–2013; Lieutenant Governor of Massachusetts: 1983–1985 |
| Former governor Gary Locke | Gary Faye Locke (born January 21, 1950) is an American politician and diplomat who served as the 21st Governor of Washington. In an interview, the former Asian-American Washington State Governor has stated that "Given the mood of the country and the concerns that people have, I think it would be possible for an African American or an Asian American to run for president now (2004), and clearly in 2008.": Governor of Washington: 1997–2005 |
| Governor Janet Napolitano | Janet Ann Napolitano born November 29, 1957, in New York is an American politician, lawyer, and university administrator who served as the 21st Governor of Arizona from 2003 to 2009. In February 2006, Napolitano was named by The White House Project as one of "8 in '08", a group of eight female politicians who were suggested as possible candidates for president in 2008. On January 11, 2008, she endorsed then Illinois Senator Barack Obama as the Democratic nominee for president.: Governor of Arizona 2003–2009; Attorney General of Arizona: 1999–2003 |
| Sam Nunn, former senator from Georgia | Samuel Augustus Nunn Jr., born September 8, 1938, in Georgia, is an American politician who served as a United States Senator from Georgia. On August 19, 2007, Nunn said he would not decide on a presidential bid until after the 2008 primary season, when presumptive nominees by both parties would emerge. However, speculation over a Nunn White House bid ended on April 18, 2008, when he endorsed Democratic presidential contender Barack Obama.: U.S Senator from Georgia (1972–1997) |
| Al Sharpton | Al Sharpton, born October 3, 1954, in New York, is a Pentecostal minister, civil rights activist, former candidate for mayor of New York and for the Democratic nomination for U.S. Senator from New York, and candidate for the 2004 nomination. When asked about 2008, he replied, "Don't get Hillary mad at me." He was one of the first candidates to enter the 2004 race, but said nothing about 2008. His 2004 campaign was not a great success. He never got more than 10% of the vote in any state, although he did get 20% in the District of Columbia. There are still unresolved campaign-finance issues left over from that campaign. In January 2007, when asked if he was considering running in 2008, Sharpton said "I don't hear any reason not to," adding, "we'll see over the next couple of months." On April 2, 2007, Sharpton announced that he would not get into the 2008 presidential race. |
| Mark Warner, former governor of Virginia | Mark Warner, born December 15, 1954, in Indiana, is a former governor of Virginia. He became the Democratic candidate in the 2008 US Senate election in Virginia, and eventually won the seat. As a successful governor from a "red state" (barred from serving consecutive terms by state law) and popular within the party, it was highly anticipated that Warner would mount a presidential bid. In October, though Governor Warner stated that he would not seek the presidency. He then endorsed Barack Obama. He was the keynote speaker at the Democratic Convention. On November 4, Warner won the election for U.S. Senator from Virginia.: U.S. Senator from Virginia 2009–present; Governor of Virginia: 2002–2006 |

== See also ==
- 2008 Democratic National Convention
- 2008 Democratic Party vice presidential candidate selection
- Nationwide opinion polling for the 2008 United States presidential election
- 2008 Republican Party presidential candidates
- Third-party and independent candidates for the 2008 United States presidential election
- Timeline of the 2008 United States presidential election
