= Dennis Kucinich 2008 presidential campaign =

American political campaign

Dennis Kucinich for President 2008
- Campaign: U.S. presidential election, 2008
- Candidate: Dennis Kucinich; House Representative of Ohio (1997–2013); Mayor of Cleveland (1977–1979)
- Affiliation: Democratic Party
- Slogan: Strength through Peace

Website
- Dennis Kucinich 2008

The 2008 presidential campaign of Dennis Kucinich, House Representative of Ohio and former mayor of Cleveland, began on December 12, 2006, when he announced that he would seek the nomination for the Democratic Party to run for President of the United States. Although a Democratic candidate, he was not included in the New Hampshire debates on January 4, 2008, or the South Carolina debates on January 21, 2008, because of his poor showings in the Iowa caucuses and the polls.

On Thursday, January 24, 2008, Kucinich dropped his bid for the Democratic nomination after failing to draw more than 10% of the vote in a single contest. In withdrawing from the race, he cited his exclusion from Presidential debates and his desire to continue his service in Congress.

== Campaign platform ==
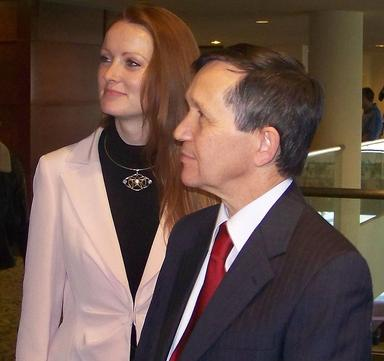
Kucinich with his wife in January 2008.

On December 11, 2006, in a speech delivered at Cleveland City Hall, Kucinich announced he would seek the nomination of the Democratic Party for President in 2008. His platform for 2008 included:

- Creating a single-payer system of universal health care that provides full coverage for all Americans by passage of the United States National Health Care Act.
- The immediate, phased withdrawal of all U.S. forces from Iraq; replacing them with an international security force.
- Guaranteed quality education for all; including free pre-kindergarten and college for all who want it.
- Immediate withdrawal from the World Trade Organization (WTO) and North American Free Trade Agreement (NAFTA).
- Immediate repeal of the USA PATRIOT Act.
- Fostering a world of international cooperation.
- Abolishing the death penalty.
- Environmental renewal and clean energy.
- Preventing the privatization of social security.
- Providing full social security benefits at age 65.
- Creating a cabinet-level "Department of Peace"
- Ratifying the ABM Treaty and the Kyoto Protocol.
- Introducing reforms to bring about instant-runoff voting.
- Protecting a woman's right to choose while decreasing the number of abortions performed in the U.S.
- Ending the war on drugs.
- Legalizing same-sex marriage.
- Lowering the voting age to 16 and the drinking age to 18
- Strongly promoting worker's rights.
- Ending the H-1B and L-1 visa Programs
- Restoring rural communities and family farms.
- Strengthening gun control.
- Legalizing medicinal marijuana and decriminalizing non-medical possession.

Kucinich describes his stance on the issues as mainstream. "My politics are center for the Democratic party," he said in an interview before an AFL-CIO sponsored debate.

== Polling ==
Kucinich ranked close to last place (ranging from 8 to 12th) in early polls but got stronger by June and July climbed to 4th and 5th in several polls. In the Rasmussen Reports poll of August 14, 2007, he was tied for 5th place, behind Senator Hillary Rodham Clinton, Senator Barack Obama, former Senator John Edwards, New Mexico Governor Bill Richardson, and tied with Senator Joe Biden. Data from Rasmussen Reports A Rasmussen poll of Democratic candidates, released on September 5, 2007, showed Kucinich in a tie for fourth place with Governor Richardson with 4% of Democratic voters saying they support him. The latest Fox News poll that did not include former Vice President Al Gore placed Kucinich with 4% of registered Democratic voters, behind Hillary Clinton, Barack Obama, and John Edwards. Including Gore, Kucinich is tied with Governor Richardson.

In the early primary state of New Hampshire, Kucinich polled as high as tied for 4th place at 7%.

Kucinich has fared much better with unofficial online polls of "netroots" voters, winning the November 2007 Democracy for America "pulse poll", taking first place in over 40 states . Likewise, Kucinich took first in a Daily Kos poll of who won the Las Vegas presidential primary debate .

== Endorsements ==
Kucinich's campaign was endorsed by Willie Nelson, Gore Vidal, Shelley Morrison, Viggo Mortensen, Sean Penn, the Mexican American Political Association, Atlanta Progressive News, and Los Angeles City Council member Bill Rosendahl.

== Exclusions from debates and primaries ==
Kucinich was excluded from the January 15, 2008 debate in Las Vegas, Nevada. Kucinich sued for the right to participate in the debate, but the Nevada Supreme Court ruled in favor of MSNBC.

Kucinich was excluded from Texas Democratic Primary because he refused to sign a so-called "loyalty oath," which required the signers to "fully support the Democratic nominee for president, whoever that shall be." Kucinich lost his federal suit to be included on the ballot. Kucinich appealed the decision to the United States Supreme Court, which denied his emergency motion for injunction appeal. Kucinich was not included on the ballot.

== Withdrawal from race ==
On January 24, 2008, Dennis Kucinich dropped his presidential bid.

== Endorsements of other candidates ==
Kucinich suggested Ron Paul as his choice running mate in November 2007. In a January 1, 2008, press release Kucinich asked his Iowa supporters to make Barack Obama their second choice as he endorsed Obama.

On August 26, 2008, at the 2008 Democratic National Convention, Kucinich gave a spirited speech structured around the refrain "Wake up America!" The speech levies trenchant criticism of the perceived abuses of power of the George W. Bush administration, attacks the corporate control of the American political and economic systems, and rallies for a program of universal health coverage, universal higher education, tax reform, trade policy reform, energy regulation, civil liberties and de-militarization. At the end of the speech, Kucinich reiterates his endorsement for Barack Obama and Joe Biden for president and vice-president. His words electrified the audience who began delivering a standing ovation midway through the speech and continued cheering past its closure.

== Delegate count ==
2008 Democratic presidential primaries delegate count As of June 10, 2008
Candidate	Actual pledged delegates^{1} (3,253 of 3,909 total)	Predicted pledged delegates^{2} (3,409 of 3,909 total)	Estimated superdelegates^{2} (694 of 825 total)	Estimated total delegates^{2} (4,103 of 4,934 total; 2,118 needed to win)
Barack Obama	1,661	1,763	438	2,201
Hillary Clinton	1,592	1,640	256	1,896
John Edwards	–	6	–	6
Color key	1st place Candidate has withdrawn his/her campaign			
Sources:^{1} "Primary Season Election Results". The New York Times. June 26, 2008. Archived from the original on June 26, 2008.^{2} "Election Center 2008 Primaries and Caucuses: Results: Democratic Scorecard". CNN. August 20, 2008.

== See also ==
- Political positions of Dennis Kucinich
