= 2008 South Carolina Democratic presidential primary =

- January 26, 2008

54 Democratic National Convention delegates (45 pledged, 9 unpledged)

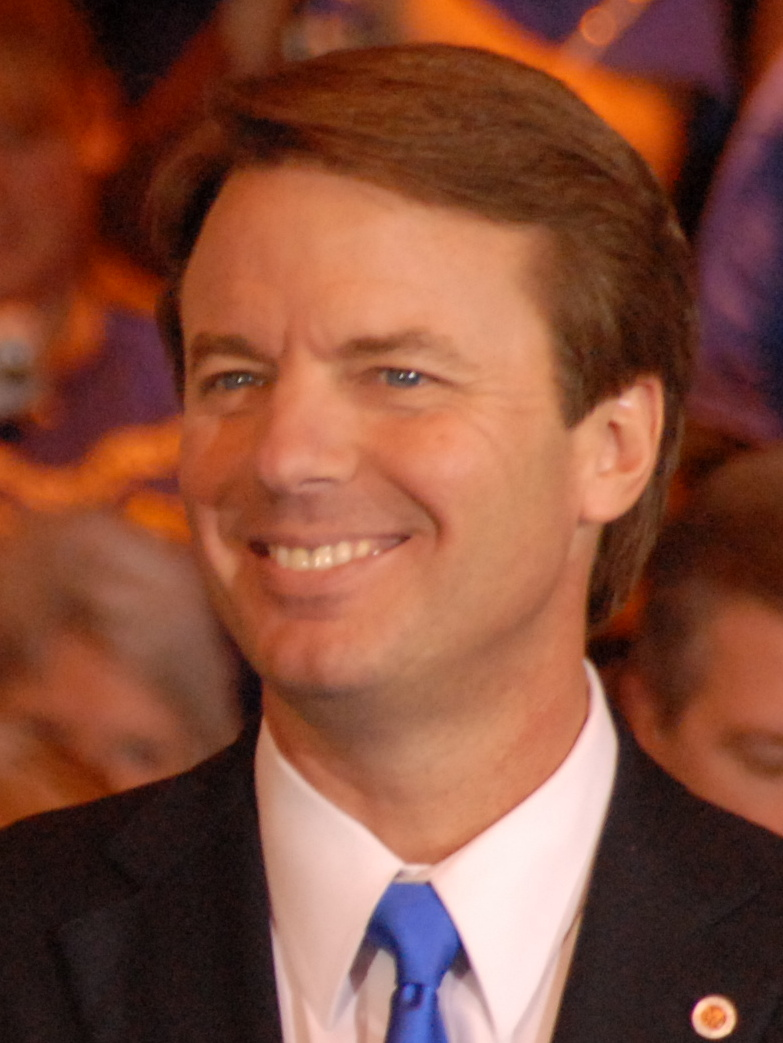
Nominee	Barack Obama	Hillary Clinton	John Edwards
Home state	Illinois	New York	North Carolina
Delegate count	25	12	8
Popular vote	295,214	141,217	93,576
Percentage	55.4%	26.5%	17.6%
- County results Obama: 30–40% 40–50% 50–60% 60–70% 70–80% Clinton: 30–40% Edwards: 40–50%

The 2008 South Carolina Democratic presidential primary took place on January 26, 2008. Senator Barack Obama of Illinois won the primary's popular vote by a 28.9% margin.

For both parties in 2008, South Carolina's was the first primary in a Southern state and the first primary in a state in which African Americans make up a sizable percentage of the electorate. For Democrats, it was also the last primary before 22 states hosted their primaries or caucuses on February 5, 2008 (Super Tuesday).

South Carolina's 45 delegates to the 2008 Democratic National Convention were awarded proportionally based on the results of the primary. The state also sent nine superdelegates.

== Candidates ==
=== Remaining ===
- New York Senator Hillary Clinton
- Former North Carolina Senator John Edwards
- Former Alaska Senator Mike Gravel
- Illinois Senator Barack Obama

=== Eliminated ===
- Delaware Senator Joe Biden Dropped out on January 4, 2008
- Connecticut Senator Chris Dodd Dropped out on January 4, 2008
- New Mexico Governor Bill Richardson Dropped out on January 10, 2008
- Ohio Representative Dennis Kucinich Dropped out on January 25, 2008
- New York Comedian Stephen Colbert Denied Ballot (13-3) on November 1, 2007 and dropped out November 5, 2007

== Campaign Finances ==
On the day of the South Carolina primary, Senator John Edwards led in fund raising from the state of South Carolina, followed by Barack Obama and Bill Richardson.

Obtained from CNN as of January 26, 2008

Candidate	Money raised (US$)
John Edwards	$316,319
Barack Obama	$257,118
Bill Richardson	$196,850
Hillary Clinton	$131,950
Joe Biden	$55,350
Chris Dodd	$22,750
Dennis Kucinich	$3,750

== Polling leading up to primary ==
All monthly averages were retrieved from RealClearPolitics.

Candidate	November	December	January	Final 3 Polls Averages
Hillary Clinton	40%	34%	27%	28%
Barack Obama	27%	33%	41%	48%
John Edwards	11%	15%	17%	23%

Denotes Leader during Poll Average

Despite maintaining a major early lead in the polls, Senator Clinton rapidly fell after the Iowa Caucuses, as Barack Obama skyrocketed and John Edwards began to receive a gradual increase in the polling.

However, in the last three polls taken before the South Carolina Primary, Barack Obama took a commanding lead over both Edwards and Clinton. Also, Former Senator John Edwards had come into the margin of error with Senator Clinton for second place in the South Carolina Primary.

== Final Campaigning ==
=== Obama Campaign ===
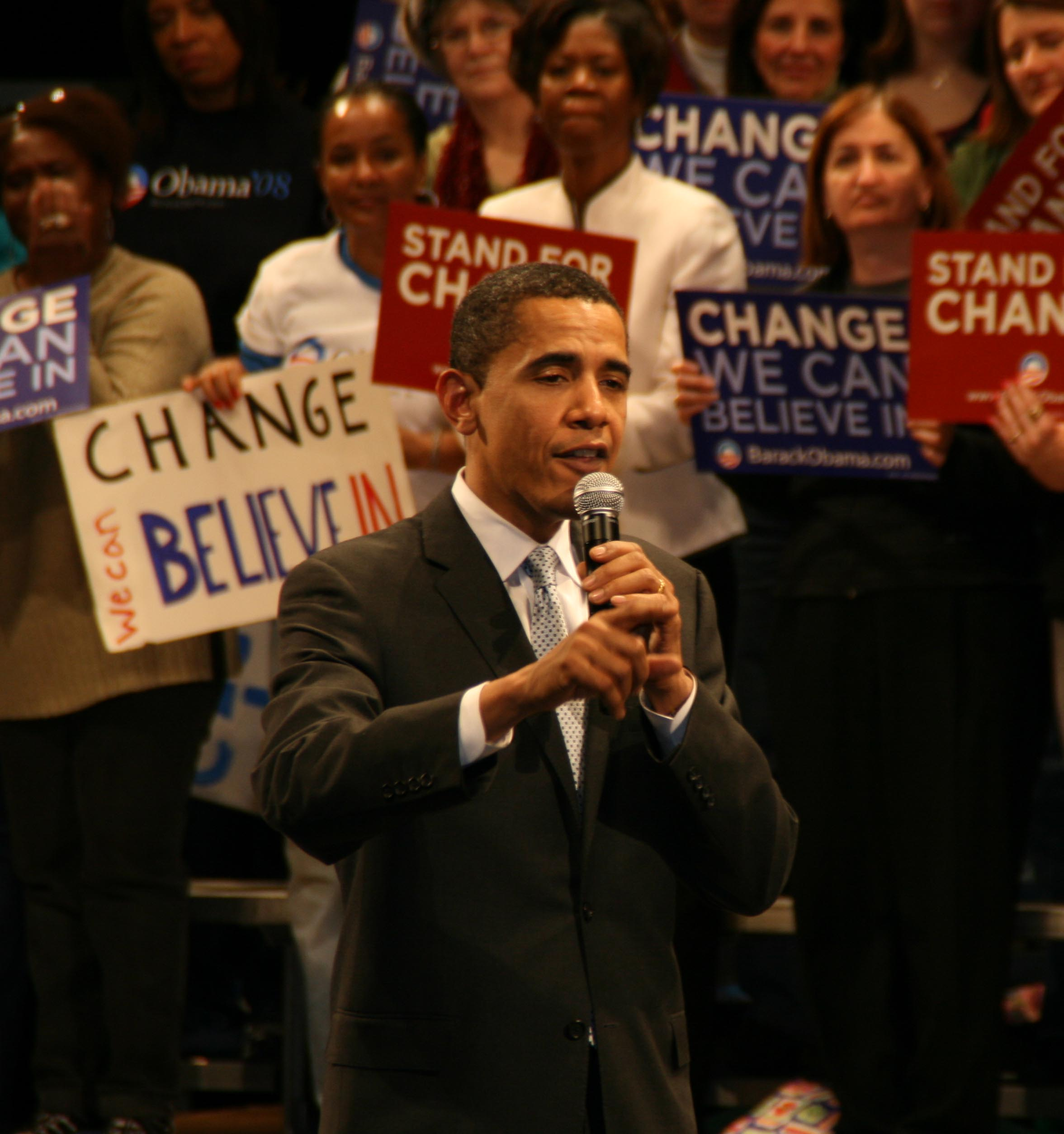
Presidential candidate Barack Obama addresses supporters the night before South Carolina's primary

Throughout the South Carolina campaign, most pundits had predicted Barack Obama the winner, primarily because of the state's large African-American population. For this reason, Obama was shown to be significantly ahead of his two rivals, John Edwards, who carried the state in 2004, and Hillary Clinton, whose husband was popular in the African-American community. In early polls taken in the weeks leading up to the primary, Clinton had a double-digit lead over both Edwards and Obama (see poll averages above).

During a majority of the final campaigning, the attacks between the Clinton campaign and the Obama campaign highly intensified by the candidates as well as the media coverage. Barack Obama began to attack former President Bill Clinton for his comments which were taken as racist. These comments are considered by analyst and historians alike as the turning point of the South Carolina primary and ultimately the cause of Clinton's loss of support from the black community.

Despite the increasing tensions between the Clinton and Obama camps, Obama continued to widely lead in the polls (despite a surge by Edwards). Into the final days of the campaign in South Carolina, it became apparent that Obama would win by a rather wide margin. The final tally had Obama winning by 28.9% over his closest rival, Hillary Clinton.

=== Clinton Campaign ===
In the early months of the campaign, Clinton enjoyed a steep lead over Senator Obama, and a 30-point lead over former Senator John Edwards. However, after Obama's win in Iowa, Clinton's campaign in South Carolina began to fall apart by the Obama political machine rolling into South Carolina with force.

For Clinton, despite winning the popular vote in Nevada, the fact that she had lost Nevada's National Delegates, receiving 12 compared to Obama's 13 still lingered in the media. This, combined with the fact of Bill Clinton's continuing negative publicity from "injecting race into the campaign" as several people called Bill Clinton's actions in his wife's campaign.

Between battling media scrutiny on Bill Clinton, constant attacks between the Obama and Clinton campaigns, and a surging John Edwards which threatened a Clinton second-place finish, poll number began to plunge, with a poll taken by Reuters-Cspan-Zogby showing Clinton in the margin of error for second place with Edwards, with Edwards at 21% and Clinton at 25%. This was also combined with the fact of Edwards's constant barrage of attacks claiming Clinton (and Obama's) big city politics were "too good for the people of South Carolina".

However, despite the attacks from opponents that Bill Clinton's attacks largely alienated African-Americans, Clinton was able to keep a 35% support amongst that key constituency, while losing the white vote to Edwards, In the end, Clinton's African-American support was able to place her in a clear second-place finish, finishing 9 points ahead of John Edwards despite losing to Obama by 29 points.

=== Edwards Campaign ===
After the terrible results for the Edwards Campaign during the Nevada caucuses, in which Edwards finished in third with 4% of the state delegation and received no national delegates, South Carolina began to look as a state where he needed a strong finish, after finishing in third in the last three primaries which took place, and trailing in the number of total national delegates.

South Carolina was the state in which Edwards was born and raised. In 2004, Edwards won the South Carolina Primary, with 45% of the vote to John Kerry's 30% and Al Sharpton's 10%. While entering South Carolina, it became apparent that he needed a first-place finish, which seemed impossible, or a second-place finish, which seemed more within grasp.

Before the CNN South Carolina Debate in Myrtle Beach on Monday, January 21, 2008, John Edwards was placing a distant third in a poll taken before the debates on January 19, in which he placed third with 15% compared to Hillary Clinton's second place with 27%. However, after the South Carolina debates, the tone of the campaign severely shifted.

During the South Carolina Democratic Debate in Myrtle Beach, Edwards sought to distinguish himself from Senators Obama and Clinton, and criticized them for their attacks and "big city" politics. As soon as he began to question how the attacks helped, he was widely cheered by the audience for in what many people thought was what distinguished Edwards from negative campaigning. Saying "This kind of squabbling, how many children are going to get healthcare? How many people are going to get an education from this? How many kids are going to be able to go to college because of this? We have got to understand and I respect both of my fellow candidates, but we have got to understand that this is not about us personally, it is about what we are trying to do for this country and what we believe in", Edwards began to get applause from several members of the audience.

After the debate, John Edwards began to see a major influx of money and in turn, poll numbers began to rise rapidly in Edwards's favor. Along with the debate performance, Bill Clinton's remarks began to alienate black supporters from Clinton, and white supporters from Obama. As a result, Edwards won amongst white voters ages 30 to 50, while receiving the same amount of support from white 60+ year olds as Hillary Clinton according to CNN Exit Polls

However, Edwards was not able to get much support from non-whites, and according to Exit Polls, received only 2% of the non-white support, while receiving 40% of the white support.

== Results ==
Barack Obama won the primary, taking 44 of the 46 counties; Edwards won in his native Oconee County, while Clinton won in Horry County, which contains Myrtle Beach. Those in italics are candidates who have withdrawn from the race but still remained on the ballot.

South Carolina Democratic Presidential Primary Results – 2008
Party	Candidate	Votes	Percentage	Delegates	Projected national delegates
Democratic	Barack Obama	295,214	55.44%	25	33
Democratic	Hillary Clinton	141,217	26.52%	12	12
Democratic	John Edwards	93,576	17.57%	8	0
Democratic	Bill Richardson	727	0.14%	0	0
Democratic	Joe Biden	694	0.13%	0	0
Democratic	Dennis Kucinich	552	0.1%	0	0
Democratic	Christopher Dodd	247	0.05%	0	0
Democratic	Mike Gravel	241	0.05%	0	0
	Totals	532,468	100.00%	45	45

=== Results by county ===
County	Clinton	Hillary%	Edwards	John%	Obama	Barack%	Others	Totals	TEV	TO%	MV	MV%
ABBEVILLE	738	20.74%	802	22.54%	2,006	56.38%	12	3,558	12,679	28.06%	1,204	33.84%
AIKEN	4,901	33.53%	1,866	12.77%	7,768	53.14%	83	14,618	81,695	17.89%	2,867	19.61%
ALLENDALE	392	27.07%	92	6.35%	951	65.68%	13	1,448	5,143	28.15%	559	38.60%
ANDERSON	5,485	31.43%	5,603	32.11%	6,315	36.18%	49	17,452	87,170	20.02%	712	4.08%
BAMBERG	751	27.57%	222	8.15%	1,720	63.14%	31	2,724	7,929	34.35%	969	35.57%
BARNWELL	820	29.93%	273	9.96%	1,632	59.56%	15	2,740	11,569	23.68%	812	29.64%
BEAUFORT	5,115	30.10%	2,239	13.18%	9,550	56.20%	90	16,994	79,056	21.50%	4,435	26.10%
BERKELEY	3,880	23.48%	2,676	16.19%	9,869	59.72%	101	16,526	74,907	22.06%	5,989	36.24%
CALHOUN	699	25.57%	413	15.11%	1,607	58.78%	15	2,734	8,883	30.78%	908	33.21%
CHARLESTON	11,287	23.49%	6,438	13.40%	30,073	62.59%	246	48,044	176,390	27.24%	18,786	39.10%
CHEROKEE	1,238	25.95%	1,495	31.34%	2,025	42.45%	12	4,770	25,362	18.81%	530	11.11%
CHESTER	1,089	25.19%	650	15.04%	2,558	59.17%	26	4,323	16,170	26.73%	1,469	33.98%
CHESTERFIELD	1,468	26.56%	1,290	23.34%	2,737	49.51%	33	5,528	19,174	28.83%	1,269	22.96%
CLARENDON	1,155	19.00%	803	13.21%	4,079	67.11%	41	6,078	19,018	31.96%	2,924	48.11%
COLLETON	1,119	22.46%	855	17.16%	2,979	59.78%	30	4,983	19,249	25.89%	1,860	37.33%
DARLINGTON	1,911	21.43%	1,282	14.37%	5,672	63.59%	54	8,919	34,298	26.00%	3,761	42.17%
DILLON	814	19.06%	692	16.20%	2,749	64.36%	16	4,271	15,073	28.34%	1,935	45.31%
DORCHESTER	3,231	25.03%	2,444	18.93%	7,165	55.51%	68	12,908	63,990	20.17%	3,934	30.48%
EDGEFIELD	754	25.81%	243	8.32%	1,908	65.32%	16	2,921	13,203	22.12%	1,154	39.51%
FAIRFIELD	996	20.04%	537	10.81%	3,410	68.63%	26	4,969	12,512	39.71%	2,414	48.58%
FLORENCE	3,700	22.09%	2,222	13.26%	10,768	64.28%	62	16,752	65,702	25.50%	7,068	42.19%
GEORGETOWN	1,951	21.90%	1,573	17.66%	5,334	59.87%	51	8,909	34,582	25.76%	3,383	37.97%
GREENVILLE	11,918	27.93%	9,047	21.20%	21,532	50.45%	180	42,677	222,320	19.20%	9,614	22.53%
GREENWOOD	1,528	20.68%	1,436	19.44%	4,373	59.19%	51	7,388	33,087	22.33%	2,845	38.51%
HAMPTON	726	21.73%	362	10.84%	2,232	66.81%	21	3,341	11,517	29.01%	1,506	45.08%
HORRY	9,983	38.57%	7,249	28.01%	8,541	33.00%	107	25,880	127,392	20.32%	(1,442)	-5.57%
JASPER	577	18.76%	190	6.18%	2,285	74.28%	24	3,076	10,150	30.31%	1,708	55.53%
KERSHAW	2,285	27.97%	1,505	18.42%	4,353	53.29%	26	8,169	31,680	25.79%	2,068	25.32%
LANCASTER	2,318	30.75%	1,678	22.26%	3,505	46.50%	37	7,538	34,008	22.17%	1,187	15.75%
LAURENS	1,599	22.91%	1,719	24.63%	3,639	52.14%	22	6,979	30,912	22.58%	1,920	27.51%
LEE	650	17.20%	427	11.30%	2,673	70.71%	30	3,780	10,166	37.18%	2,023	53.52%
LEXINGTON	7,887	34.50%	5,591	24.46%	9,303	40.69%	80	22,861	131,165	17.43%	1,416	6.19%
MARION	955	14.88%	786	12.25%	4,633	72.19%	44	6,418	18,677	34.36%	3,678	57.31%
MARLBORO	1,000	23.38%	760	17.77%	2,501	58.46%	17	4,278	13,783	31.04%	1,501	35.09%
MCCORMICK	382	21.52%	186	10.48%	1,195	67.32%	12	1,775	5,848	30.35%	813	45.80%
NEWBERRY	1,200	26.37%	1,120	24.61%	2,209	48.54%	22	4,551	18,168	25.05%	1,009	22.17%
OCONEE	2,106	28.99%	3,257	44.83%	1,884	25.93%	18	7,265	37,483	19.38%	(1,373)	-18.90%
ORANGEBURG	4,581	24.51%	1,634	8.74%	12,373	66.21%	99	18,687	52,047	35.90%	7,792	41.70%
PICKENS	2,521	30.47%	2,815	34.03%	2,904	35.10%	33	8,273	54,976	15.05%	89	1.08%
RICHLAND	14,888	23.46%	6,192	9.76%	42,146	66.41%	235	63,461	187,988	33.76%	27,258	42.95%
SALUDA	662	27.34%	465	19.21%	1,279	52.83%	15	2,421	9,963	24.30%	617	25.49%
SPARTANBURG	7,719	30.43%	6,326	24.94%	11,250	44.35%	74	25,369	130,510	19.44%	3,531	13.92%
SUMTER	2,870	19.16%	1,294	8.64%	10,765	71.87%	49	14,978	51,736	28.95%	7,895	52.71%
UNION	908	21.62%	1,224	29.15%	2,048	48.77%	19	4,199	14,721	28.52%	824	19.62%
WILLIAMSBURG	1,266	17.40%	578	7.95%	5,380	73.95%	51	7,275	18,409	39.52%	4,114	56.55%
YORK	6,967	36.02%	3,250	16.80%	9,020	46.63%	106	19,343	105,781	18.29%	2,053	10.61%
Totals	140,990	26.49%	93,801	17.63%	294,898	55.42%	2,462	532,151	2,246,241	23.69%	153,908	28.92%

Delegates: The South Carolina Democratic Party - State Election Results

== Analysis ==
2008 South Carolina Democratic presidential primary
Demographic subgroup	Obama	Clinton	Edwards	% of total vote
Total vote	55	27	18	100
Sex
Male	54	23	23	39
Female	54	30	16	61
Race
White	24	36	40	43
Black	78	19	2	55
Age
18-29 years old	67	23	10	14
30-44	62	23	15	26
45-59	55	26	19	34
60 and older	38	35	27	26
Education
No college degree	53	28	18	63
College graduate	53	26	22	37
Income
Less than $50,000	57	28	15	53
$50,000 - $75,000	53	24	22	21
$75,000 - $100,000	50	24	26	11
More than $100,000	46	30	24	15
Political philosophy
Very liberal	59	31	10	20
Somewhat liberal	51	31	18	24
Moderate	52	23	24	42
Somewhat conservative	48	28	24	10
Very conservative	52	32	15	5
Issue that matters most
Economy	52	29	19	52
War in Iraq	58	23	19	19
Health care	56	26	18	25
Candidate quality that matters most
Can bring about needed change	75	15	10	54
Cares about people like me	40	17	43	24
Has the right experience	7	84	9	14
Has the best chance to win	40	36	24	6

== See also ==
- South Carolina primary
- South Carolina Republican primary, 2008
