= John Edwards 2008 presidential campaign =

American political campaign

John Edwards for President 2008
- Campaign: 2008 United States presidential election
- Candidate: John Edwards; U.S. Senator from North Carolina (1999–2005)
- Affiliation: Democratic Party
- Status: Announced December 28, 2006; Withdrew January 30, 2008
- Headquarters: Chapel Hill, North Carolina
- Key people: David Bonior (Manager); Joe Trippi (Senior Strategist); Jon Prince
- Receipts: (2008-01-31)
- Slogan: Tomorrow Begins Today

Website
- johnedwards.com (archived - January 2, 2008)

The 2008 presidential campaign of John Edwards, former United States Senator from North Carolina and Democratic nominee for Vice President in 2004, began on December 28, 2006, when he announced his entry into the 2008 presidential election in the city of New Orleans near sites devastated by Hurricane Katrina. On January 30, 2008, Edwards returned to New Orleans to announce that he was suspending his campaign for the Presidency. On May 14, 2008, he endorsed Barack Obama at a campaign event in Grand Rapids, Michigan.

== Campaign ==
=== Timeline ===
On December 28, 2006, Edwards officially announced his candidacy for president in the 2008 election. The day before, his campaign website accidentally released that Edwards would be entering the 2008 presidential election when it went live for a short time one day prior to his planned announcement in Eastern New Orleans. He also inadvertently released his campaign slogan early as well: "Tomorrow begins today." This ended months of speculation about whether or not Edwards would make a second run for president.

David Bonior, a former House Democratic Whip from Michigan, was Edwards' campaign manager, bringing strong relationships with organized labor, as well as experience in grassroots campaigning. Kate Michelman, a nationally prominent abortion rights activist and former leader of NARAL, joined the campaign as a senior adviser, charged with outreach to women. Joe Trippi, former Howard Dean Internet strategist, joined Edwards' campaign as part of the media team and also senior adviser in April 2007.

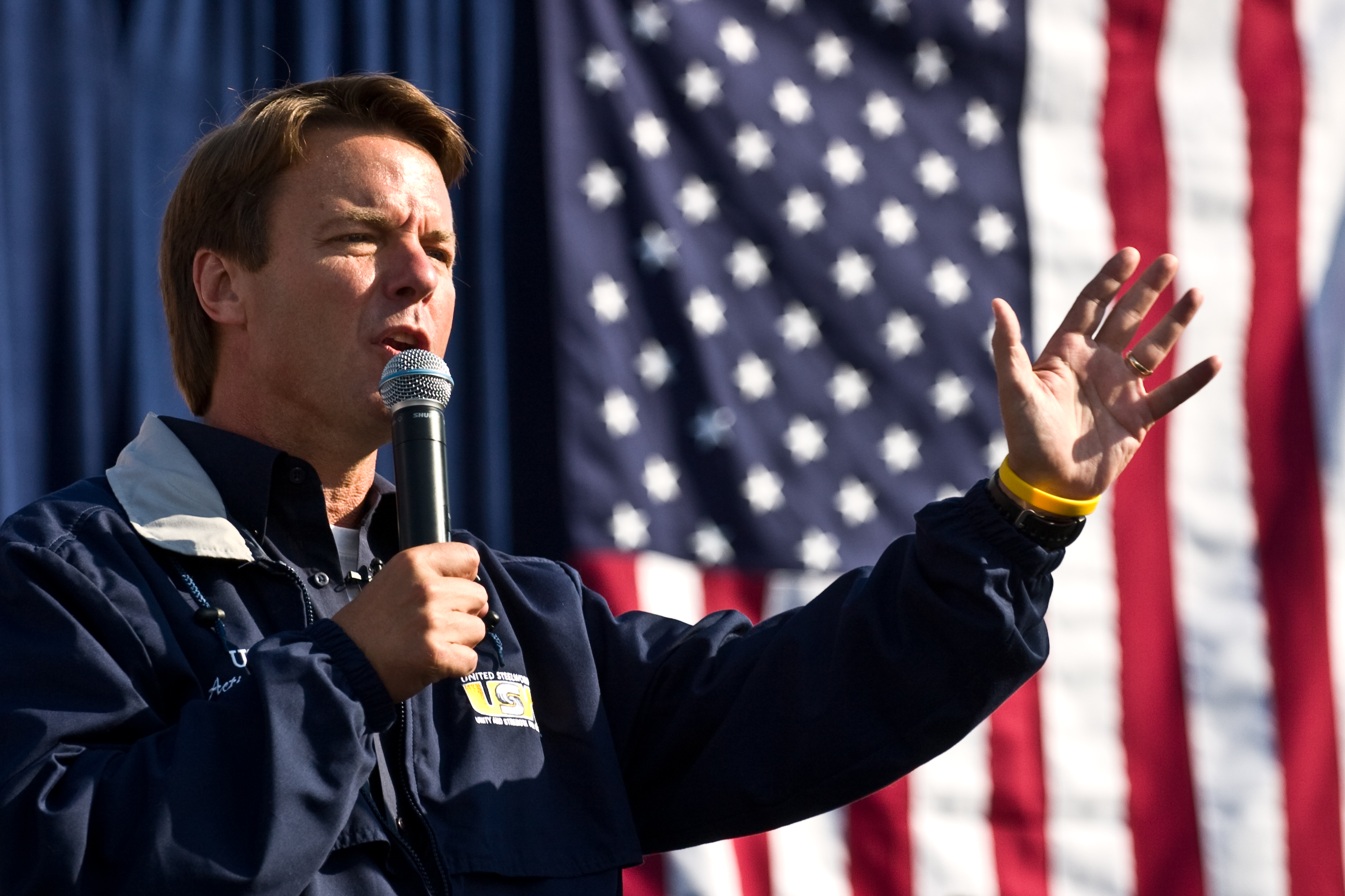
John Edwards campaigning in Pittsburgh, Pennsylvania on Labor Day in 2007.

Two newly hired staff members responsible for the Edwards campaign blog, Amanda Marcotte and Melissa McEwan, came under fire from The Catholic League on February 6 regarding comments they had made in their personal blogs prior to joining the campaign which many Catholics considered bigoted. Edwards refused to fire them, saying that while "intolerant language will not be permitted from anyone on my campaign...I also believe in giving everyone a fair shake". The bloggers issued statements separating their personal blogs from the campaign, but Marcotte resigned a few days later, saying that the Catholic League's harassment was interfering with her ability to do her job.

During a speech at the American Conservative Union's Political Action Conference, Ann Coulter used the epithet "faggot" in what she claimed afterward was meant as a one-liner joke about presidential candidate Edwards, a remark for which she was criticized by pundits on the left and the right. Edwards responded to Coulter's remark, saying: "I think it's important that we not reward hateful, selfish, childish behavior with attention..."

After his campaign kicked off in 2007, Edwards faced questions about potential conflicts between his campaign against poverty and his personal wealth, particularly the price of his recently built home (estimated at more than $6 million) and how much he paid for two haircuts ($400 each). Edwards reimbursed the campaign and explained that the cost was high because the stylist had to travel to where he was to give the cut.

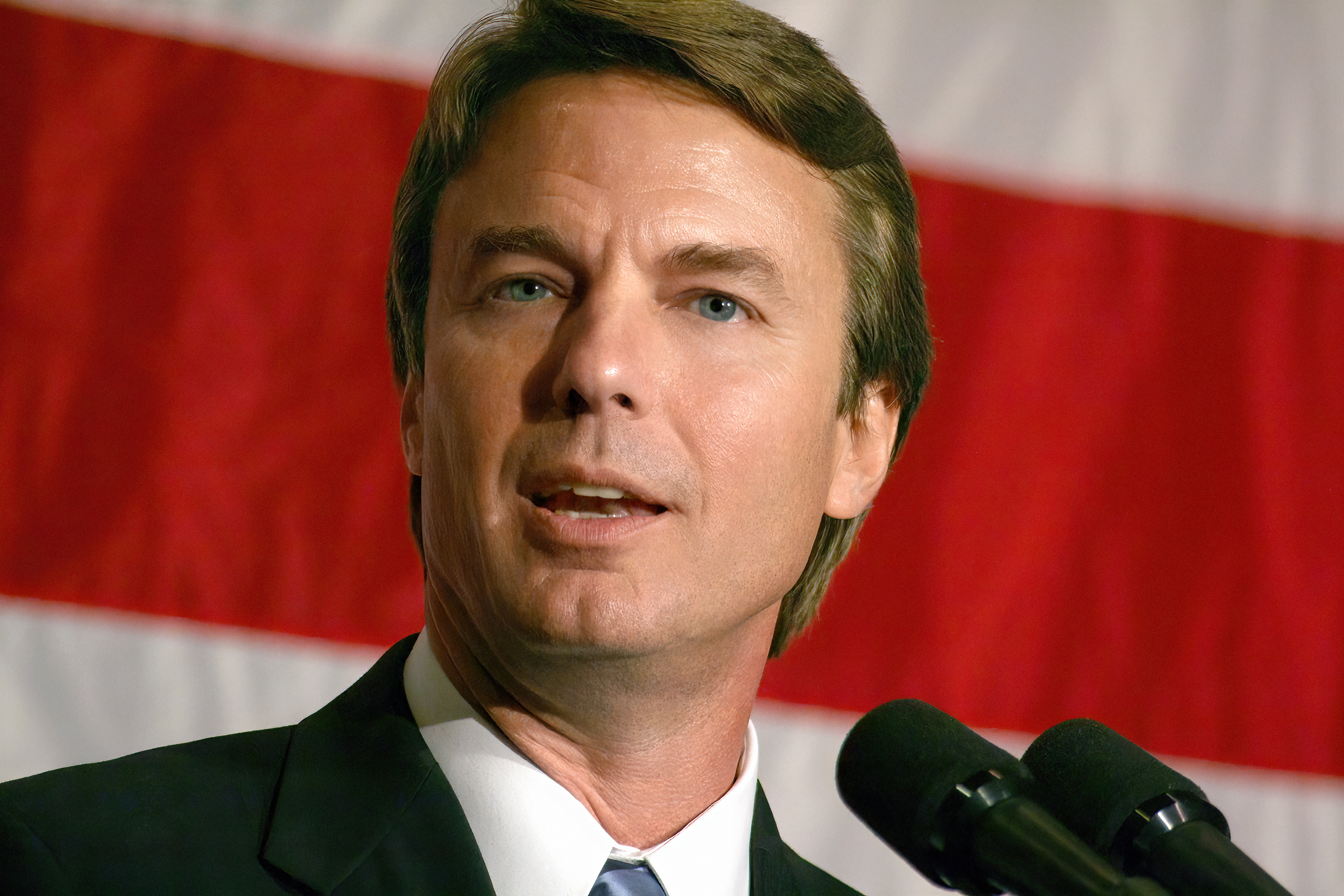
John Edwards speaking in Detroit on April 21, 2007

On March 22, 2007, Edwards and his wife announced that she was diagnosed with stage-IV breast cancer, with newly discovered metastases to the bone and possibly to her lung. They said that the cancer was "no longer curable, but is completely treatable" and that they planned to continue campaigning together with an occasional break when Ms. Edwards requires treatment, saying "The campaign goes on strongly." This ended erroneous media speculation prior to the press conference that Edwards would announce a suspension of his campaign.

In May 2007, Edwards explained that his 2005 decision to work for the hedge fund Fortress Investment Group was so that he might learn more about the way financial markets and poverty were linked, saying "It was primarily to learn, but making money was a good thing, too". Edwards initially declined to disclose exactly how much money he made, saying that all information would be released in his financial disclosure forms when candidates are required to do so. Those forms, released a week later, showed that Edwards made $479,512 from his time at Fortress, making it his biggest single source of earned income in 2006. In addition, Edwards has raised at least $167,700 for his campaign from individuals associated with Fortress Investment Group.

During a campaign speech to the Council on Foreign Relations in May 2007, Edwards called the war on terrorism a slogan that was created for political reasons and that it wasn't a plan to make the United States safe. He went further to compare it to a bumper sticker and that it had damaged the US's alliances and standing in the world. In response to the Edwards' remarks, President Bush's homeland security adviser called them "irresponsible, ... offensive and outrageous".

On September 1, Hillary Clinton and Barack Obama joined Senator Edwards to stop campaigning in Michigan and Florida, two states that had bucked their party's nomination schedule.

On January 3, 2008, in the Iowa Democratic caucus, the first contest of the nomination process, Edwards placed second with 29.75 percent of the vote to Obama (37.58 percent), with Clinton coming in third with 29.47 percent of the vote. On January 8, Edwards placed a distant third in the New Hampshire Democratic primary with just less than 17% (48,818 votes). On January 26, Edwards again placed third in the South Carolina Democratic primary, his birth state, which he carried in 2004, and he placed third in the non-binding Florida Democratic primary on January 29.

On January 30, 2008, Edwards announced that he was ending his campaign for the presidency.

On February 13, 2008, several high-ranking advisers close to Edwards stated that he believed that Clinton was the strongest remaining Democratic candidate and that, because of this belief, she was most likely to receive his public endorsement. However, Obama's meeting with Edwards on February 17 brought that statement into question.

=== Fundraising ===
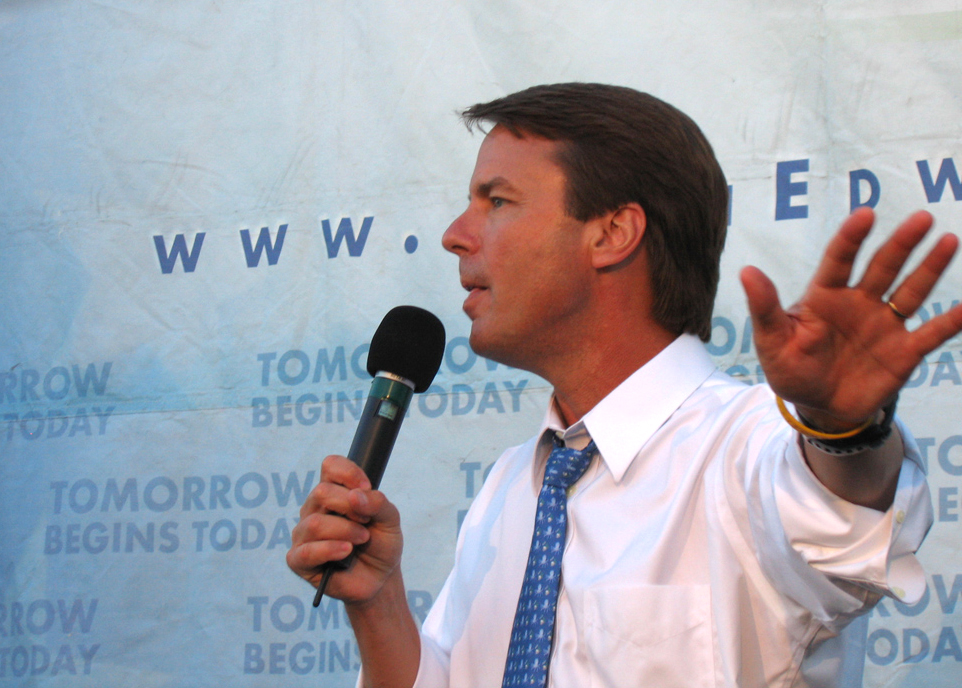
Edwards speaking at a "Small Change for Big Change" fundraiser in Los Angeles, California in August, 2007.

In the first quarter of 2007, the Edwards campaign raised over $14 million, $1 million of which was reserved for the general election. Almost $3.3 million of the $14 million was raised from over 37,000 contributions made over the Internet.

On June 21, 2007, Edwards campaign adviser Joe Trippi sent out a fundraising email stating that the campaign had a goal of raising $9 million in the second quarter and $40 million before the Iowa caucuses.

On June 25, 2007, with the end of the second quarter of fundraising approaching and the campaign short of its goal, Trippi sent a strongly worded email to supporters, saying that "the whole Washington establishment wants our campaign to go away." Trippi wrote, "they don’t want the American people to hear the message, so they attack the messenger. They call him a hypocrite because he came from nothing, built a fortune while standing up for regular people during some of their toughest times, and—heaven forbid!—he has the nerve to remember where he came from and still care passionately about guaranteeing every family the opportunities he had to get ahead."

On July 1, 2007, the Edwards campaign announced that they had met their goal just a few hours before the midnight deadline. Edwards shrugged aside criticism that he had not raised nearly as much as his competitors by noting that Howard Dean, the leading fundraiser in 2004 did not get the nomination.

On September 27, 2007, Edwards announced during a CNN interview that his campaign would accept public financing, enabling him to receive federal matching funds for the primary season. The Federal Election Commission formally declared him qualified on November 1, 2007.

=== Opinion polling ===
Towards the end of 2007, polls indicated Edwards as either tied for 1st or 2nd place, depending on the poll, for the January 3, 2008, Iowa caucus and in 3rd place for the January 8 New Hampshire primary. Edwards finished in 2nd place in the Iowa caucus with 30% of the vote, behind Senator Barack Obama who had 38%, and ahead of Senator Hillary Clinton who had 29%. On January 8, he placed third in the New Hampshire primary, the first primary of the nominating process.

The early national polls showed Edwards placing third among the Democratic field, behind Clinton and Obama.

=== Results ===
Map showing results by county. Barack Obama John Edwards Hillary Clinton Tie

On January 3, 2008, the 2008 Iowa caucus was held across the state of Iowa. Unlike primaries, voting during the Iowa caucuses was held across the state where participants gathered into groups to select their choice for the Democratic nominee. If a candidate failed to garner over 15% of the support at a particular site, all supporters at that site would be given the option to leave or join a different candidate.

As votes were being tallied on caucus night, Edwards was in a tight battle for second place with Clinton, after major news agencies had projected that Obama had carried the caucuses. With 100% of the votes counted, Edwards was confirmed to have finished in second place during the Iowa caucuses with 744 state delegates, approximately 30% of the state delegation narrowly edging out Hillary Clinton's 737 State delegates, approximately 29% of the state delegation Both lost to Barack Obama's 940 delegates, 38% of the state delegation.

Following the Iowa caucus, Edwards vowed to stay in the race until the Democratic Convention in Denver despite having less support among New Hampshire voters in the New Hampshire primary. A poll released after the Iowa caucus showed that 20% of those polled showed their support for Edwards, compared to 33% for both Hillary Clinton and Barack Obama However, Edwards finished in a distant third with 17% of the vote, compared to second-place finisher Barack Obama who received 37% support, and even further behind Clinton, who won the state and received 39% of the vote.

Edwards was hit by further losses, including a distant third showing during the Nevada caucus, receiving 4% of the vote. This prompted Edwards to say "I got my butt kicked" during an interview with Wolf Blitzer on Late Edition.

Finally, the Edwards campaign staked much of their campaign on South Carolina, a state in which the Senator won in 2004 with 45% of the vote, and the state in which he had been born. After a praised debate performance during the Democratic debate in Myrtle Beach shortly before the South Carolina primary, Edwards began to see a last minute surge shortly before the contest. During the conclusion of a last minute surge the week before the primary, most polls indicated Clinton and Edwards in a close match for second place in South Carolina. In the end, Clinton came in second with 27% of the vote, while Edwards came in third with 18% of the vote.

After a non-binding contest in Florida, Edwards left the race, but garnered meaningful shares of the vote in some Super Tuesday contests, including with 10% of the vote in Oklahoma and 4% in Tennessee.

Primary Contest	Place	Percentage
Iowa	2nd Place	30%
New Hampshire	3rd Place	17%
Nevada	3rd Place	4%
South Carolina	3rd Place	18%
Florida (non-binding)	3rd Place	14%

Edwards won the nominating contest (None)
Edwards Placed Second in the Nominating Contest (Iowa)
Edwards placed Third in the Nominating Contest (New Hampshire, Nevada, South Carolina, Florida)

==== Delegate count ====
2008 Democratic presidential primaries delegate count As of June 10, 2008
Candidate	Actual pledged delegates^{1} (3,253 of 3,909 total)	Predicted pledged delegates^{2} (3,409 of 3,909 total)	Estimated superdelegates^{2} (694 of 825 total)	Estimated total delegates^{2} (4,103 of 4,934 total; 2,118 needed to win)
Barack Obama	1,661	1,763	438	2,201
Hillary Clinton	1,592	1,640	256	1,896
John Edwards	–	6	–	6
Color key	1st place Candidate has withdrawn his/her campaign			
Sources:^{1} "Primary Season Election Results". The New York Times. June 26, 2008. Archived from the original on June 26, 2008.^{2} "Election Center 2008 Primaries and Caucuses: Results: Democratic Scorecard". CNN. August 20, 2008.

== Endorsement ==
The endorsement of Edwards was sought by both Hillary Clinton and Barack Obama.

Edwards, after dropping out of the primaries, had a total of 19 pledged delegates from the Iowa caucus, the New Hampshire primary, and the South Carolina primary. In addition to 19 Pledged Delegates, before departing the race, Edwards had the support of 26 Super Delegates in the Democratic Party. Also, Edwards had been endorsed by several influential unions such as the United Steelworkers.

Edwards met with Barack Obama on February 17, 2008, to discuss various issues regarding his endorsement. The meeting garnered media attention despite the fact that no endorsement immediately followed it.

Edwards had frequent conversations with Hillary Clinton throughout his time after the primaries. Clinton met with Edwards in North Carolina on February 10, 2008, to discuss, among other things, a possible endorsement.

On May 14, 2008, Edwards traveled to Grand Rapids, Michigan, to officially endorse Senator Barack Obama for the Democratic nomination. During his endorsement speech, Edwards praised Senator Clinton but stated that "the voters have made up their mind and so have I" to the sound of resounding applause of the packed audience.

After Edwards had endorsed Obama, twelve of Edwards' delegates pledged their support to Obama. The United Steelworkers also followed his lead and endorsed Senator Obama.

== Endorsements ==
List of individuals endorsing John Edwards
- On April 25, 2007, Edwards released a list of endorsements in New Hampshire. Senator Edwards received the most endorsements by state senators among Democratic candidates. Supporters include State Sen. David Gottesman of Nashua, State Senate Majority Leader Joe Foster of Nashua, and Deputy Majority Leader Peter Burling of Cornish.
- On April 19, the Edwards campaign announced that AAPI (Asian American and Pacific Islanders) leaders from across the country endorsed Senator Edwards' presidential bid.
- Maine Senate President Beth Edmonds and 22 other prominent Democrats in Maine.
- Former Georgia Governor Roy Barnes, Georgia Senate Democratic leader Robert Brown, and Georgia House of Representatives Democratic leader Dubose Porter.
- Former New Jersey Governor Richard Codey.
- On June 7, 2007, prominent actor Danny Glover announced his endorsement for Senator Edwards and campaigned for him.
- On November 8, 2007, the students of Westminster College in New Wilmington, PA elected John Edwards as the Presidential candidate for the 2008 Democratic ticket as part of their 17th Mock Convention. Stephen Colbert was elected as the Vice-Presidential candidate.
- Oklahoma Senate President Mike Morgan and 31 other Oklahoma legislators endorsed Edwards.
- United Steelworkers
- United Mine Workers
- Transport Workers Union of America
- Joe Wineke, Chairman of Wisconsin Democratic Party
- Dave Cieslewicz, Mayor of Madison
- Betty Yee, Chairwoman of California Board of Equalization
- James Denton, Actor
- Iowa State Council of the Service Employees International Union
- State Senator Leland Yee of California
- California State Council of the Service Employees International Union
- Michigan State Council of the Service Employees International Union
- Washington State Council of the Service Employees International Union
- Oregon State Council of the Service Employees International Union
- Ohio State Council of the Service Employees International Union
- Idaho State Council of the Service Employees International Union
- Montana State Council of the Service Employees International Union
- West Virginia State Council of the Service Employees International Union
- Minnesota State Council of the Service Employees International Union
- Massachusetts State Council of the Service Employees International Union
- Former Lieutenant Governor Mark Taylor of Georgia
- Caucus4Priorities,
- Kevin Bacon, Actor
- Tim Robbins, Actor
- Susan Sarandon, Actress
- Madeleine Stowe, Actress
- Friends of the Earth Action, national environmental group
- Harry Belafonte, Musician, Actor, Social Activist
- Mari Culver, First lady of Iowa
- Ralph Nader
- James K. Galbraith and other economists
- John Mellencamp, Singer
- Daryl Beall, State Senator from Iowa
- Hank Azaria, Actor
- Seth Green, Actor
- The Fresno Bee, daily newspaper of Fresno, California
- Lars Ulrich

=== Members of Congress ===
- Rep. Bruce Braley (D-IA)
- Rep. Bob Etheridge (D-NC)
- Rep. Charlie Gonzalez (D-TX)
- Rep. Eddie Bernice Johnson (D-TX)
- Rep. Mike McIntyre (D-NC)
- Rep. Brad Miller (D-NC)
- Rep. Jim Oberstar (D-MN)
- Rep. David Obey (D-WI)
- Rep. David Price (D-NC)
- Rep. Stephanie Herseth Sandlin (D-SD)
- Rep. Heath Shuler (D-NC)
- Rep. Bart Stupak (D-MI)
- Rep. Mel Watt (D-NC)
- Rep. Mike Michaud (D-ME)

== Opposition ==
The Wall Street Journal criticized his healthcare plan and estimated it would cost the taxpayers $120 billion a year and pointed out how Edwards did not address the Tax Code with regards to S-Corporation loopholes that allow people to dodge medicare taxes; a loophole Edwards himself has used in the past.

Host of the O’Reilly Factor, Bill O'Reilly was a vocal critic of Edwards since the beginning of the controversy regarding comments made by his former bloggers Marcotte and McEwan. O'Reilly guessed that what he termed the "radical left" had intimidated Edwards and controlled his agenda. O'Reilly claimed that Edwards pulled out of the Fox News debates to curry favor with financier billionaire George Soros, whom O'Reilly felt was funding radical causes. Edwards was also disparagingly characterized on O'Reilly's show as "Huey Long with a Madison Avenue makeover" for his opposition to the surge. O'Reilly provided no evidence to substantiate his claims.

The News Corporation criticized remarks Edwards made about its subsidiary Fox News, saying that Edwards' criticism was hypocritical as he received an advance from HarperCollins, also a subsidiary of News Corp, for his book. Edwards donated the money to charity; however, O'Reilly's show alleged that Edwards did not provide proof of it when asked.

== See also ==
- Political positions of John Edwards
- John Edwards
- 2008 United States presidential election
- John Edwards extramarital affair
- John Edwards 2004 presidential campaign
