= Tiger Bay (disambiguation) =

Tiger Bay is a district of Cardiff.

Tiger Bay may also refer to:

== Arts and entertainment ==
- Tiger Bay (1934 film), a British film starring Anna May Wong
- Tiger Bay (1959 film), a British film starring John and Hayley Mills, and Horst Buchholz
- Tiger Bay (album), a 1994 album by Saint Etienne
- "Tiger Bay", a song from the 1979 album Attila by Mina
- "Tiger Bay", a song by The Hennessys

== Other uses ==
- Tiger Bay, a body of water in south-central Echols County, Georgia
- HMS Tiger Bay, a former Argentine patrol boat
- Tiger Bay State Forest, a forest in Volusia County, Florida
- Tiger Bay Club, a political club in Florida
- Tiger Bay Brawlers, a roller derby league founded in April 2010

== See also ==
- Tiger's Bay, area of Belfast, Northern Ireland
