= 2008 Nevada Democratic presidential caucuses =

- January 19, 2008

34 Democratic National Convention delegates (25 pledged, 9 unpledged)

Nominee	Hillary Clinton	Barack Obama
Home state	New York	Illinois
Delegate count	12	13
Popular vote	5,459	4,844
Percentage	50.82%	45.09%
- Caucus results by county Clinton: 40–50% 50–60% Obama: 40–50% —50–60% —60–70%

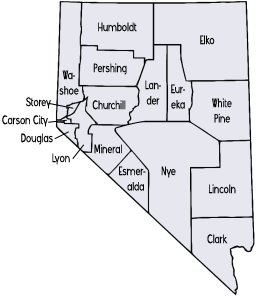

The 2008 Nevada Democratic presidential caucuses took place on January 19, 2008 after having been moved from a later date by the Nevada Democratic Party. The Nevada Democratic Caucus was considered important in determining the eventual party nominee, as many described it as the "Bellwether of the West" seeing as how it is the first Western state to vote in the Democratic Presidential Primary season.

Nevada's 25 "pledged" delegates to the Democratic National Convention were chosen on May 17, 2008, when the Nevada Democratic Party held its State Convention. Barack Obama ended up receiving 14 national delegates compared to Hillary Clinton who received 11 national delegates. However, Clinton did ultimately prevail in terms of the number of votes received during the Nevada Democratic Caucus. It was the only state that held a caucus that she won during the course of the Democratic Presidential Primary.

== Process ==
The Nevada Democratic Caucus was open to all voters who would be 18 by November 4, 2008, regardless of party affiliation. Republicans, unaffiliated voters, and members of other parties could change their registration at the door, and new voters could register as well.

As with all Democratic caucuses, voters gathered into preference groups for each candidate. A minimum threshold of 15 percent was required in each precinct in order to achieve viability. If a candidate's preference group was not viable, they chose to caucus with another group, or be uncommitted. Unlike the Iowa Caucus, "raiding" of other, already viable caucus groups, was prohibited. Delegates to the county convention were then selected amongst the candidate groups. A similar process occurred at the county convention. Although they file statements of support for their chosen candidate, all delegates are technically unbound until the state convention.

In addition to the 1,754 neighborhood caucus locations, nine at-large caucus locations were available for shift workers who could not return to their home precincts to caucus. These at-large precincts were at the Wynn, Bellagio, The Mirage, Paris Las Vegas, New York-New York, Flamingo, Caesars Palace, and The Rio, all located in Clark County. Workers who worked within 2.5 miles (4.0 km) of the caucus site, were scheduled to work during or within one hour of the caucus period, and those who had an employer ID showing their employment in the zone were permitted to attend. Unlike regular caucuses where delegates are apportioned based on registered voters, the at-large locations were allocated based on attendance, which caused controversy (see below).

The Nevada Democratic Party reported county convention delegate totals to the media and not actual votes, similar to the way the Iowa Democratic Party did in its caucus.

== Pre-caucus events, predictions, and polls ==
The date of the Nevada Democratic Caucuses were moved from a later date to January 19, 2008. Analysts from CNN believe that this occurred because of many factors, such as the growing West, a large Hispanic population, a heavily unionized work force, the influence of Senate Majority Leader Harry Reid, and the idea that earlier caucuses increased voter participation. In addition, Democrats in the working class hold sway over liberal activists; this would allow candidates to discuss practical issues and policy details.

After Barack Obama's win in the Iowa Democratic Caucuses and Hillary Clinton's surprise comeback win at the New Hampshire Democratic Primary, the Nevada Democratic Caucuses were seen as a potential tie-breaker. A victory in the Nevada Democratic Caucus would provide a candidate with momentum heading into Super Tuesday. In addition, the Nevada Democratic Caucuses were seen as a test of the organizing abilities of its unions and the growing influence of the state's Latino community, which makes up more than 20 percent of the population.

On January 9, 2008, Obama received his first key national labor endorsement from leaders of the 450,000-member UNITE HERE union. This endorsement was made on behalf of Nevada's largest union, the 60,000-member Culinary Workers Union, Local 226. As a result, Obama received a huge boost in support from the Latino population.

A pre-caucus opinion poll conducted by the Las Vegas Review-Journal on January 18, 2008, showed that Hillary Rodham Clinton was leading with 41 percent of the vote. Barack Obama had 32 percent of the vote, and John Edwards had 14 percent. Another poll by the American Research Group five days before the caucuses on January 14, 2008, showed that Clinton was leading with 35 percent, Obama had 32 percent, and Edwards at 25 percent. These polls only showed the results of the top-tier candidates who were viable to win the caucuses.

=== Casino caucus lawsuit ===
An "at-large precinct" is officiated in Caesars Palace on election day.

In an attempt to block nine at-large caucus precincts from being held on the Las Vegas Strip, the Nevada State Education Association and six Las Vegas area residents filed a 13-page lawsuit on January 11, 2008. The at-large sites were created to facilitate the caucus participation of casino workers, and others working within 2.5 miles (4.0 km) of the Strip, but the plaintiffs said that these sites would both elect more state delegates than others and violate state election law. While the suit was not officially supported by any presidential campaign, the fact that it was filed two days after the Culinary Workers Union Local 226 endorsed Obama and that several of the State Education Association's leaders endorsed Clinton led some political commentators to describe it as a proxy battle between the two campaigns.

After a court hearing, Judge James Mahan of the U.S District Court for Nevada ruled that the caucus locations were fair and valid and disagreed with the group's argument. Therefore, the nine caucus sites located in casinos in Las Vegas were allowed to operate.

== Results ==
Hillary Clinton won the most local delegates while Barack Obama was projected to win the most delegates to the Democratic National Convention. Nevada's delegates to the Democratic National Convention (DNC) were not allocated to the candidates for a few months, so current DNC delegate projections assumed that local and state delegate preferences remained the same through the county conventions, which occurred in February, and the state convention, which occurred in April, The reason for the so-called "split-decision" is Nevada's chosen method of electing DNC delegates. Six distinct sets of pledged DNC delegates were elected in April. The three sets determined exclusively by Clark County delegates were split evenly for a total of six for Obama and six for Clinton. The statewide pot was split five for Clinton and four for Obama. Obama's advantage was due to his strength in Northern Nevada, particularly of Washoe County's three DNC delegates Obama received two as well as the one "rural" DNC delegate who backed Obama as well.

Unlike in Iowa, the Nevada Democratic Party reports only the number of county convention delegates won statewide by supporters of the candidates (in Iowa "state delegate equivalents" are reported). In neither Iowa nor Nevada are individual voter preferences reported. And like Iowa, all local delegates selected in the January 19 caucuses are technically free to support any candidate during later stages of the nominating process.

At the controversial At-Large caucuses on the Vegas Strip, many workers who belonged to unions other than Local 226 attended; contrary to the statements of President Bill Clinton leading up to the vote, all workers on shift within 2.5 miles (4.0 km) were permitted to caucus. Clinton supporters won the Strip, 268 local delegates to 224. Widely publicized statements by President Clinton that voters in "casinos" would have at least 5 times the influence of other voters turned out to be incorrect; Strip voters had only twice the influence that voters in the rest of the state on average had.

=== Caucus results ===
Caucus Date: January 19, 2008

National Pledged Delegates Determined: 0 (of 25)

Nevada Democratic Presidential Caucus Results – 2008
Party	Candidate	County Delegates	Percentage	Estimated national delegates
Democratic	Hillary Clinton	5,459	50.82%	12
Democratic	Barack Obama	4,844	45.09%	13
Democratic	John Edwards	399	3.71%	0
Democratic	Dennis Kucinich	5	0.05%	0
Democratic	Mike Gravel	0	0%	0
Democratic	Write-in candidate	1	0.01%	0
Democratic	Uncommitted	34	0.32%	0
Totals		2,500	100.00%	25
Voter turnout		%		—

=== County conventions ===
All of Nevada's county conventions took place on February 23, but one county's convention (Clark County) had attendance that overwhelmed its ability to continue. That convention was therefore recessed to April 12.

Convention dates: February 23–April 12, 2008

National pledged delegates determined: 0 (of 25)

Nevada Democratic Presidential Caucus Results – 2008
Party	Candidate	State Delegates	Percentage	Estimated national delegates
Democratic	Hillary Clinton	1,718	51.09%	12
Democratic	Barack Obama	1,645	48.91%	13
Totals		3,363	100.00%	25
Voter turnout		%		—

=== State convention ===
Convention date: May 17, 2008

National pledged delegates determined: 25 (of 25)

Nevada Democratic Presidential Caucus Results – 2008
Party	Candidate	Votes	Percentage	National delegates
Democratic	Barack Obama	1,365	55.04%	14
Democratic	Hillary Clinton	1,112	44.84%	11
Totals		2,480	100.00%	25
Voter turnout		%		—

== See also ==
- Democratic Party (United States) presidential primaries, 2008
- Nevada Republican caucuses, 2008
