= 2008 New Hampshire Democratic presidential primary =

- January 8, 2008

30 pledged delegates to the Democratic National Convention (22 pledged, 8 unpledged)

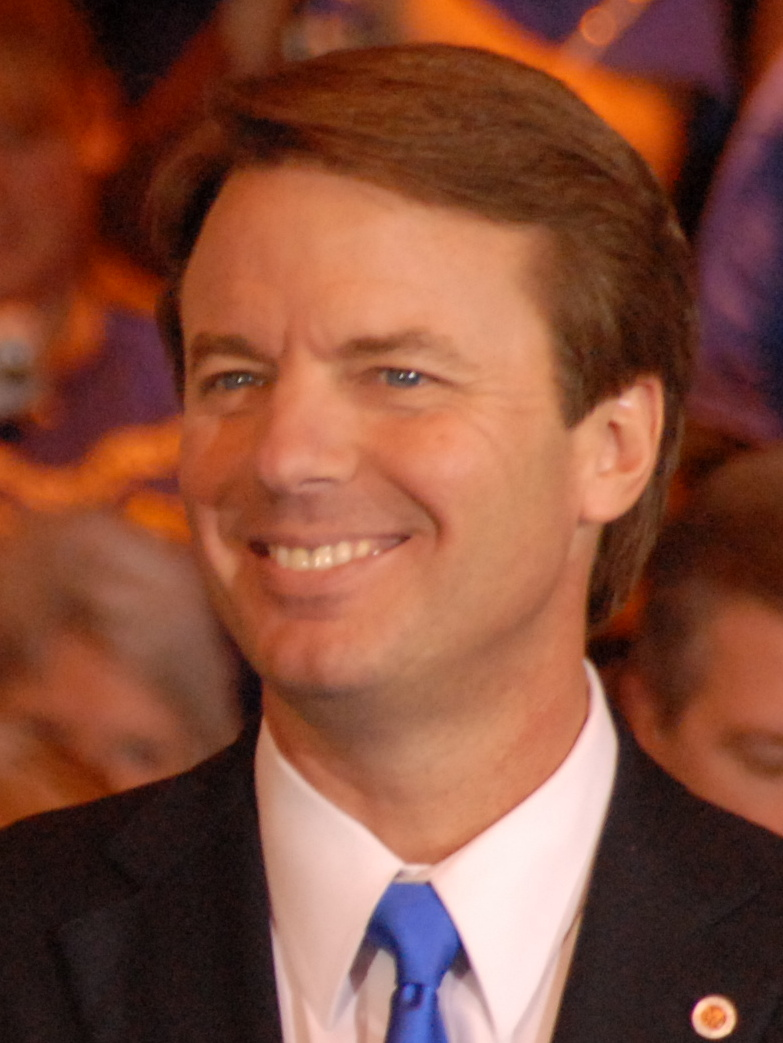
Candidate	Hillary Clinton	Barack Obama	John Edwards
Home state	New York	Illinois	North Carolina
Delegate count	9	9	4
Popular vote	112,404	104,815	48,699
Percentage	39.1%	36.5%	16.9%
- Clinton: 30–40% 40–50% 50–60% 60–70% 100% Obama: 30–40% 40–50% 50–60% 60–70% 70–80% Edwards: 30–40% 100% Richardson: 60-70% 100%

The 2008 New Hampshire Democratic presidential primary on January 8, 2008 was the first primary in the United States in 2008. Its purpose was to determine the number of delegates from New Hampshire that would represent a certain candidate at the National Convention. In a primary, members of a political party—in this case, the Democratic Party—will select the candidates to a subsequent election. Since 1920, New Hampshire has always hosted the first primaries in the entire nation. The Democratic Party's primary occurred on the same day as the Republican primary.

Hillary Clinton was the winner of the popular vote in the primary, with Barack Obama trailing in second. Clinton and Obama received an equal number of delegates to the National Convention since the percentages of their votes were close. With this win, Clinton became the first female candidate to ever win a delegate-binding primary of a major political party's presidential nominating contest.

After Obama became the Democratic Party's presumptive nominee on June 3, the New Hampshire Delegation to the 2008 Democratic National Convention unanimously cast its 30 formal votes for him, one of only three states to do so.

== Scheduling and process ==
New Hampshire hosts the first primary in the entire nation. A state law that was passed in 1975 required that the date be set at least one week before any other similar contest. The Iowa caucuses are the only delegate-choosing event before the New Hampshire primary, but since Iowa hosts caucuses, not primaries, that is not seen as violating the law.

Any registered voter may participate in New Hampshire's primary. Voters must declare a party affiliation so that they could participate in only one primary every year, not both the Democratic and Republican primaries. The voters will elect delegates to the district-level events. Candidate will only receive delegates to the national convention by receiving at least 15% of the district voters' votes. 30 delegates will be proportionally sent to the national convention.

=== Delegate allocation ===
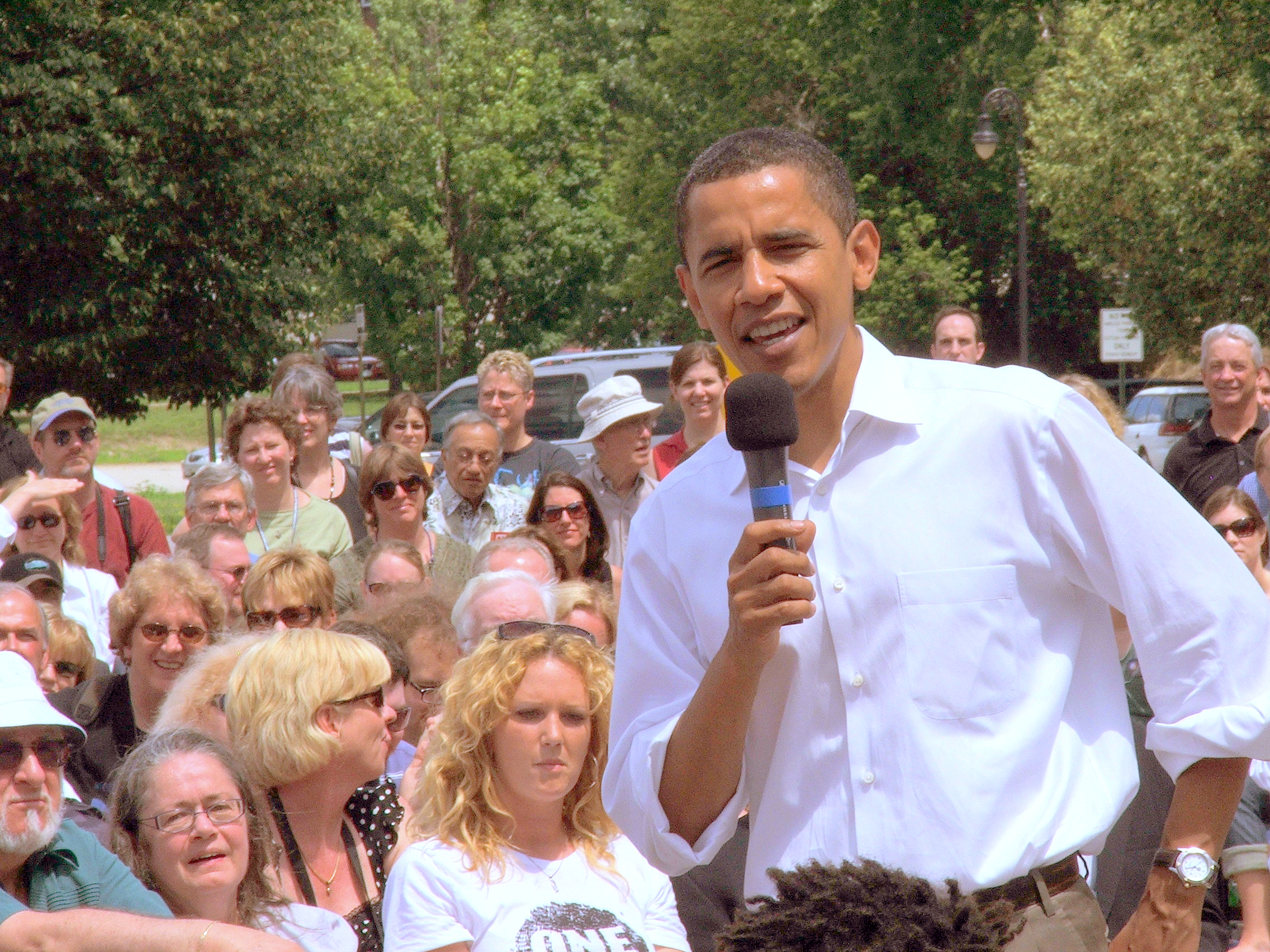
Obama campaigning in New Hampshire

Any votes cast for a candidate that did not meet the 15% threshold for votes will be discarded. 14 district delegates will be proportionally allocated to each viable presidential candidate based on the primary's results in each Congressional District. All of the district delegates are considered pledged delegates, which means that they must openly commit to a candidate before the vote and are subject to review by the candidate they represent. Both the First Congressional District and Second Congressional District are allocated 7 district delegates each. These delegates independently represent each Congressional District; they are not affected by the results of the entire state.

In addition, there are 8 more pledged delegates that are allocated based on the results of the statewide primary. Five of them would be at-large delegates to the national convention. These at-large delegates are usually selected by district-level delegates. The other 3 pledged delegates will be Party Leaders and Elected Official (PLEO) delegates. PLEO delegates usually consist of members of the Democratic National Committee, Democratic members of Congress, Democratic Governors, and former Democratic Party leaders.

While the 14 district delegates and 8 statewide delegates are pledged to represent a candidate, 8 more National Convention delegates will be considered unpledged. 7 of them are additional PLEO delegates, which consist of 4 Democratic National Committee members, 2 members of Congress, and 1 Governor. An additional unpledged delegate will be considered the add-on delegate. The add-on delegate is selected by a committee of district-level delegates.

== Pre-primary polling, predictions, and events ==
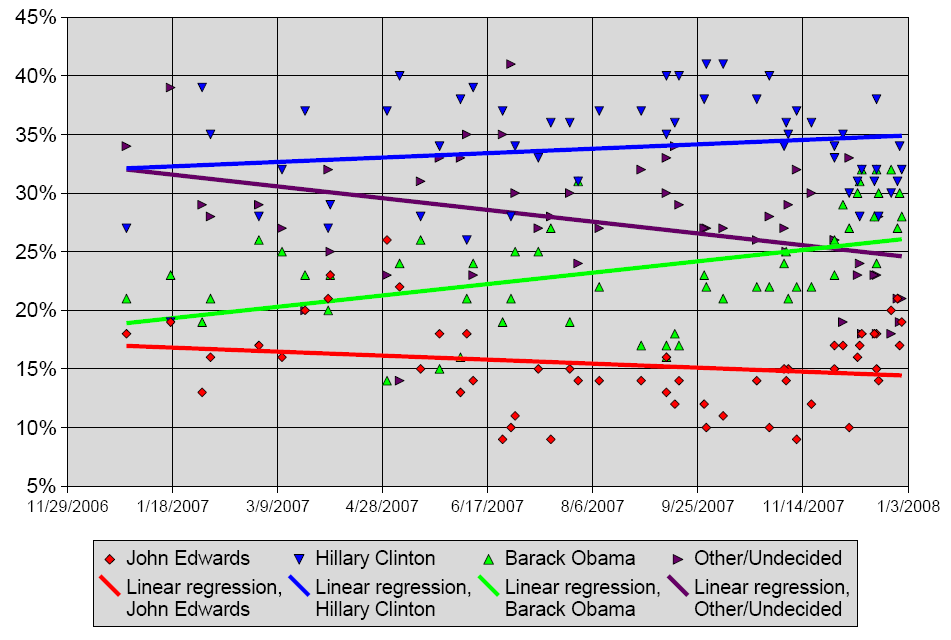
Pre-primary opinion polling statistics throughout the campaign season.

Five days before the New Hampshire primary, candidates competed at caucuses in Iowa. Barack Obama hoped that he would win these primaries the same way he defeated Hillary Clinton at the Iowa caucuses. Since his victory, he had attracted several supporters, which increased his chances at winning this primary. Likewise, Clinton was struggling to overcome setbacks after she came in third place at the caucuses in Iowa. A series of pre-primary polls showed that Obama enjoyed a significant lead. Clinton was coming second, and John Edwards third. Average polling during the period of January 5 to January 7, 2008 by Real Clear Politics indicated Obama's support at 38.3%, Clinton at 30.0%, Edwards at 18.3%, and Richardson at 5.7%. These results indicated an 8.3% lead for Obama.

On the other hand, a USA Today/Gallup poll indicated that Barack Obama enjoyed a 13-point lead over Hillary Clinton three weeks after they were tied in the pre-primary polls at New Hampshire. Even back in December 2007, Clinton was leading in the polls with 47%, and Obama had 26%. Clinton's aides responded to this by saying that she has the money to continue a national campaign. Former President Bill Clinton's campaign failed in the first five state primaries and caucuses when he ran in 1992. Despite these circumstances, Bill Clinton not only won the Democratic nomination, but he won the election.

The USA Today/Gallup poll was held on January 4, 2008. The conductors of this poll surveyed 778 New Hampshire residents who most-likely were going to attend the Democratic primaries. The survey was conducted after news from the Iowa caucuses had been reported. In the following table, the candidates' support on January 4 is compared with the results of the USA Today/Gallup poll from mid-December 2007 in New Hampshire.

Candidate	Percentage (December)	Percentage (January)
Barack Obama	32%	41%
Hillary Clinton	32%	28%
John Edwards	18%	19%
Bill Richardson	8%	6%

No other candidate had higher than 3% support in New Hampshire. Each figure has a margin of error of ±4%. Obama's 13-point lead was outside that margin.

A US Census in 2006 reported that the population of New Hampshire was 1,314,895. 356,897 did not declare a party affiliation. These independent voters make up 44 percent of the New Hampshire electorate and could have voted in either the Democratic primary or the Republican Party's primary, but couldn't have voted in both. Democratic voters made up a smaller proportion. 216,005 people have registered as a Democrat. These statistics are important because in 2004, the New Hampshire independents leaned towards the Democratic side in favor of then-candidate John Kerry. Since then, New Hampshire has become more Democratic, replacing their Republican governor and state legislature with a government led by Democratic politicians. However, the people of New Hampshire are divided into several smaller regions, so the entire state as a whole wouldn't have been expected to act in a uniform manner.

=== New Hampshire campaign office hostage-taking ===
On November 30, 2007, a man identified as 47-year old Leeland Eisenberg, armed with road flares strapped to his chest which he claimed were a bomb, entered a Clinton presidential campaign office in Rochester, New Hampshire. He took hostage the five people in it, and asked for Clinton, believing she could assist him in gaining psychiatric help. Two hostages were released early on, a woman and her infant. Other hostages were released sporadically. The standoff ended with Eisenberg's surrender about five hours after the incident began.

At the time of the event, Clinton was in the Washington D.C. area, scheduled to speak at a Democratic National Committee meeting in Vienna, Virginia; she canceled her appearances at public events for the remainder of the day. That evening she flew to Rochester in order to meet with and comfort the hostages, praise the law enforcement officials who handled the situation, and vow not to change her campaign style due to the incident.

== Results ==
Key:	Withdrew prior to contest

2008 New Hampshire Democratic Presidential Primary Results
Party		Candidate	Votes	Percentage	Delegates	Projected national delegates
	Democratic	Hillary Clinton	112,404	39.09%	9	9
	Democratic	Barack Obama	104,815	36.45%	9	13
	Democratic	John Edwards	48,699	16.94%	4	0
	Democratic	Bill Richardson	13,239	4.6%	0	0
	Democratic	Dennis Kucinich	3,891	1.35%	0	0
	Democratic	Joe Biden	638	0.22%	0	0
	Democratic	Mike Gravel	404	0.14%	0	0
	Democratic	Richard Caligiuri	253	0.09%	0	0
	Democratic	Christopher Dodd	205	0.07%	0	0
	Democratic	Kenneth Capalbo	108	0.04%	0	0
	Democratic	D. R. Hunter	95	0.03%	0	0
	Democratic	William Keefe	51	0.02%	0	0
	Democratic	Tom Laughlin	47	0.02%	0	0
	Democratic	Randy Crow	37	0.01%	0	0
	Democratic	Michael Skok	32	0.01%	0	0
	Democratic	Ole Savior	30	0.01%	0	0
	Democratic	Henry Hewes	17	0.01%	0	0
	Democratic	William Hughes	16	0.01%	0	0
	Democratic	Caroline Killeen	11	0.00%	0	0
	Democratic	Tom Koos	10	0.00%	0	0
	Democratic	Dal LaMagna	8	0.00%	0	0
	Democratic	Write-in candidates	2,517	0.87%	0	0
Totals	Democratic	All Candidates	287,527	100.00%	22	22

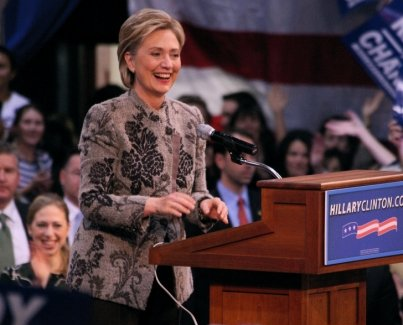
Hillary Clinton greets supporters after her NH Primary win.

Hillary Clinton led Barack Obama by 20 points in pre-primary polls in New Hampshire prior to the Iowa caucuses, but had fallen behind Obama by 13 points in the week prior to the New Hampshire primary. However, she rebounded to get more votes than Obama in the New Hampshire primary. She ultimately led the primaries by 3 percent. At her address to New Hampshire after the primary, her supporters called her the "comeback kid." According to exit polls, female voters and elderly voters helped her win this particular race. In the Iowa caucuses, Obama received 35 percent of the female vote, while Clinton only received 30 percent. In New Hampshire, however, 45 percent supported Clinton, compared to 36 percent for Obama. Also during the primary, older voters outnumbered younger voters; 67 percent of Democratic voters were over the age of 40, and most of them supported Clinton.

A turnout of nearly 288,000 people was even higher than expected, and was greater than the number of New Hampshire residents who voted for Al Gore in the 2000 presidential election.

Bill Richardson withdrew from the race after placing 4th in both the New Hampshire primary with less than 5 percent of the vote and the Iowa caucuses with less than 2 percent of the vote. He made this decision as he returned to his home state, New Mexico, on January 9, 2008, to meet with his top advisors.

== Recount ==
Most New Hampshire voters cast their votes on Diebold optical-scan systems, which are vulnerable to tampering, leading election-reform activists to immediately begin examining the results from New Hampshire, claiming later to find evidence suggesting fraud. The story initially was reported only online, but was later acknowledged by mainstream news outlets. Most observers have concluded that demographic trends influence both a community's means of counting ballots, and which candidates the community is likely to support.

On January 10, 2008, presidential candidate Dennis Kucinich requested and paid for a recount to make sure that all of the votes in the Democratic primary were counted - Republican candidate Albert Howard also requested a recount in the Republican primary. Kucinich noted the difference between pre-primary polls which showed that Obama would win, and Clinton's win in the actual election. In addition, Kucinich cited reports circulating throughout the internet that alleged disparities around the state between hand-counted ballots, which tended to favor Obama, and machine-counted ones, which seemed to favor Clinton. He did not expect the recount to dramatically change his results in the election, but in an interview with Fox News, Kucinich said "he requested the recount out of concern for the integrity of the process and not out of loyalty to any one candidate." State officials, however, strongly believe the results of the primary were very accurate. New Hampshire has not conducted a statewide recount in a presidential primary since the 1980 primary.

The recount began on January 16, 2008 after New Hampshire Secretary of State Bill Gardner received $27,000 from Kucinich. The first ballots to be counted came from Manchester. The campaigns and fair elections groups had the right to see and approve every ballot. Kucinich was able to stop the recount at any time and receive a refund for the balance of the costs of the recount, since a recount in the entire state would require $70,000. In some of the towns and wards, the vote counts were identical. Vote count changes were made in places where voters did not follow directions and marked ballots that were impossible for the machines to read. The largest example of vote miscounting was Ward 5 in Manchester, where votes for the top candidates dropped significantly after the recount. Clinton's total went from 683 to 619, Obama's went from 404 to 365, and other candidates saw similar drops. Excluding the results of Ward 5 the error rate was less than 1%. The official explanation for the discrepancies in Ward 5, which resulted in gains of nearly 10% by each of the top candidates, was that a poll worker added the vice presidential and presidential totals before reporting. These differences did not occur in the GOP recount where the votes for all candidates were exactly the same except for Mitt Romney who received 1 extra vote.

Due to insufficient funding, the recount was halted on January 23, 2008. The Deputy Secretary of State, David Scanlan, estimated that the Republican recount cost $57,600 and the Democratic recount, with more votes cast, cost $67,600.

Quin Monson, an assistant professor in the Department of Political Science at BYU, commented: "There are people that do not trust the technology. His (Dennis Kucinich's) request for the recount is likely a response to that crowd."

== See also ==
- 2008 Democratic Party presidential primaries
- 2008 New Hampshire Republican presidential primary
- New Hampshire primary
