= Tiger Bay Club =

Political club

Tiger Bay Club is a Florida-based political club that is considered non-partisan or bi-partisan. There are groups with similar-sounding names in many Florida cities, but no official relationship exists between them and the original. The organization is open by membership to professionals interested in political dialogue and discussion. The membership structure is based on open membership with annual dues. The charter and by-laws of the organization prevent it from endorsing candidates or taking sides in political campaigns, however, the clubs invite various campaigners and other politicians.

Monthly meetings are held as paid luncheons, where members hear from invited political speakers, after which members may ask questions. The meetings usually are open to the media and may lead to reports on various politicians and issues.

== History ==
The club was founded and incorporated in Miami, Florida, in 1964 by several individuals led by Stephen Paul Ross, a local political consultant. The name and format were copied later in other Florida cities without permission from the original club. The name of the city of those imitative clubs usually precedes the name copied from the original.

== Current Chapters ==
- Capital Tiger Bay Club (Tallahassee): www.capitaltigerbayclub.org
- Central Florida Tiger Bay Club: www.tigerbayclub.org
- First Coast Tiger Bay Club Jacksonville: www.fctigerbay.org
- Flagler Tiger Bay Club: www.flaglertigerbayclub.com
- Gold Coast Tiger Bay Club: www.goldcoasttigerbayclub.com
- Manatee Tiger Bay Club: www.manateetigerbay.org
- Panhandle Tiger Bay Club: www.facebook.com/tigerbayclub/
- Polk County Tiger Bay Club: www.tigerbaypolk.com
- Sarasota Tiger Bay Club: www.sarasotatigerbay.com
- South County Tiger Bay Club (Venice): www.sctigerbay.com
- Southwest Florida Tiger Bay Club: www.swfltigerbay.org
- Suncoast Tiger Bay Club: www.tigerbay.org
- Tampa Tiger Bay Club: www.tigerbayclub.com
- Volusia County Tiger Bay Club: www.tigerbayvolusia.com
