= 2008 Iowa Democratic presidential caucuses =

2008 Iowa Democratic presidential caucus
- January 3, 2008

57 Democratic National Convention delegates pledged

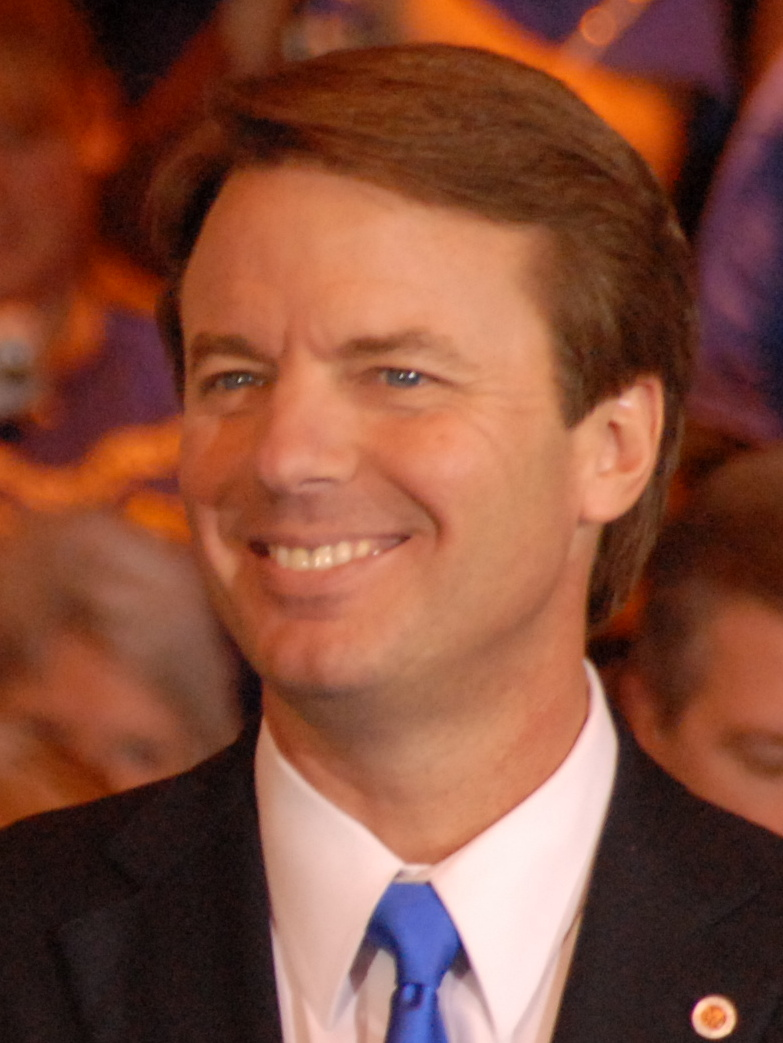

Candidate	Barack Obama	John Edwards	Hillary Clinton
Home state	Illinois	North Carolina	New York
Delegate count	16	14	15
SDEs	940	744	737
Percentage (of SDEs)	37.6%	29.7%	29.4%
- Caucus results by county Clinton: 30–40% 40–50% Obama: 30–40% 40–50% 50–60% Edwards: 30–40% 40–50% 50–60% Tie

The 2008 Iowa Democratic presidential caucus was held on January 3, and was the state caucuses of the Iowa Democratic Party. It was the first election for the Democrats of the 2008 presidential election. Also referred to as "the First in the Nation Caucus," it was the first election of the primary season on both the Democratic and Republican sides. Of the eight major Democratic presidential candidates, then-U.S. Senator Barack Obama of Illinois received the most votes and was ultimately declared the winner of the Iowa Democratic Caucus of 2008, making him the first African American to win the caucus and the first African American to win a primary state since Jesse Jackson in 1988. Former U.S. Senator John Edwards of North Carolina came in second place and then-U.S. Senator Hillary Clinton of New York finished third, though Clinton received more delegates than Edwards. Campaigning had begun as early as two years before the event.

== History of the caucus ==
The Iowa Caucuses have historically been the first held in the United States. The caucus marked the traditional and formal start of the delegate selection process for the 2008 United States presidential election, and the process in which members of the Democratic Party gathered to make policy decisions.

Iowa state law mandates that its caucus must be held at least eight days before any other meeting, caucus, or primary for the presidential nominating process. Therefore, the Iowa Caucuses have always been traditionally the leading state in the nominating process. Not only did controversy brew between the candidates, but the caucuses themselves drew a large amount of media attention. The decisions of the Iowans often affect the rest of the campaign season. Barack Obama's victory in Iowa helped establish him as one of the Democratic frontrunners of 2008 and was a first step toward his eventual nomination.

== Process ==
The caucuses followed the regular procedures of the Democratic Party process. Any voter who was a registered Democrat and a resident of Iowa was eligible to participate in the event. Individuals could have chosen to register or change their party affiliation at the door. It was estimated that 60 percent of the caucusgoers would have attended the caucuses for the first time. All of the caucusgoers met in public buildings or schools in their respective precincts and divided themselves into groups; each group represented a candidate. The voting was done publicly in a voice vote. To be viable, each preference group or candidate needed at least 15 percent of the caucusgoers' votes. If a candidate received less than 15 percent of the caucusgoers' votes, then the supporters of that non-viable candidate had 30 minutes to join a viable candidate's group, join another non-viable candidate's group to make the candidate viable, join an uncommitted group, or choose not to be counted as a voter.

In Iowa, there were 1,784 precincts for the caucuses. Each viable preference group at each caucus elected a certain number of delegates proportional to the group's size that would represent the candidate at the county conventions. There are 99 counties in Iowa, and their Democratic conventions took place on March 15, 2008. At these conventions, a subset of delegates were chosen to attend the district, then state conventions. At the Iowa Democratic Party State Convention on June 14, 2008, a subset of delegates were chosen to attend the Democratic National Convention held August 25–28, 2008, in Denver, Colorado. As in the precinct caucuses, the pledged delegates to the national convention proportionally represented the candidates compared to the results of the state caucus.

=== Delegate allocation ===
The delegate allocation to the Democratic National Convention was as follows: 29 district delegates proportionally represented a candidate's support at each congressional district. The First Congressional District receives six pledged delegates, the Second Congressional District receives seven, the Third Congressional District receives six, the Fourth Congressional District receives six, and the Fifth Congressional District receives four. All of these pledged delegates represent each congressional district independently; they are not affected by the results of the state convention.

At the Iowa Democratic Party State Convention, on the other hand, 16 pledged delegates proportionally represented the candidates' support. Ten of these delegates were designated as at-large, meaning that they represent the entire state as a whole. The other six were referred to as Party Leaders and Elected Officials (PLEO). These may include members of the Democratic National Committee (DNC), members of the U.S. House of Representatives and the U.S. Senate, the Governor, and former party leaders. Not all of the PLEOs were pledged, but if they were, they would represent the state as a whole along with the at-large delegates. In total, the Democratic presidential candidates were allocated a total of 45 pledged delegates, depending on their support in each district and in the state.

Twelve delegates that did not represent caucus results were sent to the Democratic National Convention; they are referred to as unpledged. Eleven of them are PLEOs, which include six members of the DNC, one U.S. Senator, three U.S. Representatives, and one Governor. Because these unpledged delegates' profiles are usually high-profile elected officials, they are referred to as superdelegates. The other unpledged delegate is an add-on delegate, who is selected at the Iowa Democratic Party State Convention.

While this process lasts for a period of approximately five months, the results of the state caucus are usually predictable by the results of the precincts' caucuses combined. Therefore, the results of the precinct caucuses provide a good measurement of Iowa's delegation to the Democratic National Convention.

== Pre-caucus polls ==
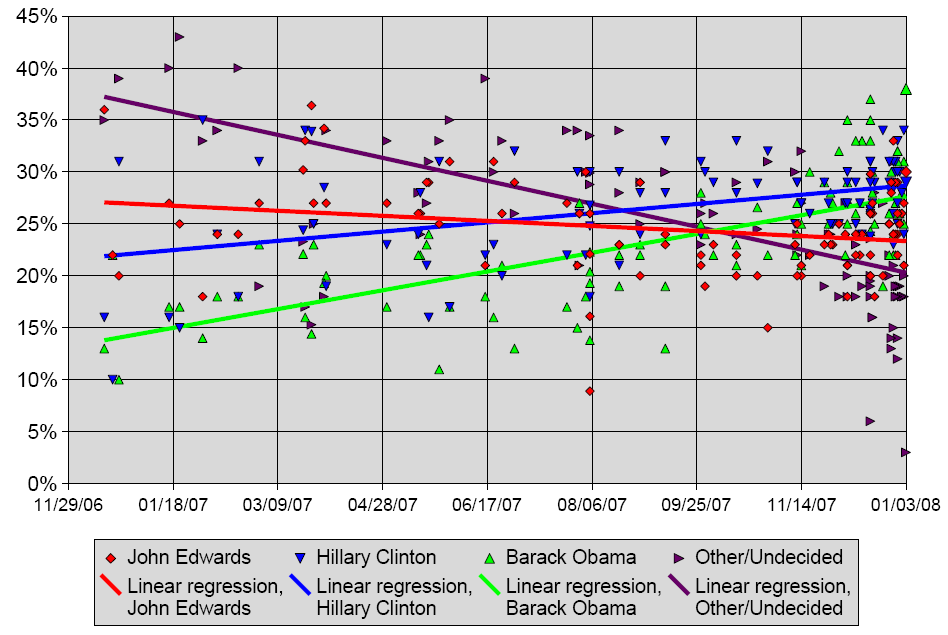
Pre-caucus opinion polling statistics throughout the campaign season.

Before the caucuses, the Des Moines Register reported that during a poll of 800 likely Democratic caucus goers from December 27 to December 30, 2007, the candidates had the following results:

- Barack Obama - 32%
- Hillary Clinton - 25%
- John Edwards - 24%
- Bill Richardson - 6%
- Joe Biden - 4%
- Christopher Dodd - 2%
- Dennis Kucinich - 1%
- Mike Gravel - 0%
- Not sure/Uncommitted - 6%

The above results have a margin of sampling error of ±3.5 percentage points.

Barack Obama's results in the opinion polls rose from 28% in the Des Moines Register's poll in late November 2007. This was in part a result of a "dramatic influx of first-time caucusgoers, including a sizable bloc of political independents." Hillary Rodham Clinton remained at a constant 25%, while John Edwards was almost unchanged when his ratings increased to 24% from 23% in November. Approximately one-third of likely caucusgoers said that they could have been persuaded to choose a different candidate before the caucuses.

The December results of the Des Moines Register's poll also showed a widened gap between the three-way contest for the lead — Clinton, Edwards, and Obama — and the rest of the Democratic candidates. No other Democrat received more than 6 percent support of caucusgoers.

Thirty percent of the sample population from the Des Moines Register's poll said that a candidate's ability to bring about change in the United States was the most important to them; 27% said that a candidate who would be most successful in unifying the country would have taken priority in their votes. Most caucusgoers also said that Obama was strong in both of these areas. Having the experience and competence to lead was considered the most important aspect of a candidate by 18 percent of the sample population; Hillary Clinton was rated best on this trait. Only 6 percent of the sample population said that being best able to win the general election was the top priority; Clinton, again, was rated best on this trait.

== Results ==
=== Caucus results ===
Caucus date: January 3, 2008

National pledged delegates determined: 0 (of 45)

2008 Iowa Democratic Presidential Caucus Results
Party	Candidate	Votes (State Delegate Equivalents)	Percentage	Pledged National Delegates (expected on January 3)
Democratic	Barack Obama	940	37.6%	16
Democratic	John Edwards	744	29.7%	14
Democratic	Hillary Clinton	737	29.4%	15
Democratic	Bill Richardson	53	2.1%	0
Democratic	Joe Biden	23	0.9%	0
Democratic	Uncommitted	3	0.2%	0
Democratic	Christopher Dodd	1	0.0%	0
Totals		2,500	100.00%	45
Voter turnout		%		—

The Iowa Democratic Party does not release vote counts (it releases only the number of delegates to the state convention). Since Hillary Rodham Clinton had the highest delegate strength in Iowa's 5th congressional district (a district allocated four national convention delegates) and received the same amount of national delegates elsewhere, she was projected to receive one more national delegate than Edwards despite receiving fewer projected delegates to the state convention.

The Democratic National Committee gives the 50 states 794 superdelegates. According to a January 4, 2008 poll conducted by the Associated Press, most of the superdelegates were undecided, but 160 had endorsed Clinton, compared to 59 for Obama and 32 for Edwards. Along with the delegates that the candidates secured from Iowa, the numbers were as follows: 175 for Clinton, 75 for Obama, and 46 for Edwards. (To win the Democratic nomination for president, 2,025 delegates are needed.) Thus, Clinton initially retained an overall delegate lead following the Iowa results.

Dennis Kucinich and Barack Obama competed against each other in the Iowa Caucuses, but Kucinich asked that Iowans caucusing for him, should they fail to build a viable preference group on Caucus Night to realign to Barack Obama in the second round. Both had fought for the same priorities including ending the Iraq War, reforming Washington, D.C., and creating a better life for working families. In the 2004 Iowa Democratic Caucuses, Kucinich made a similar announcement in favor of John Edwards. At that caucus, Edwards's aides claimed that this request helped put him in second place. In the 2008 Iowa Caucus, however, Kucinich did not conduct much of a campaign in Iowa. He paid for no organizers nor offices in the state, and he was not invited to the Des Moines Register's debate in December 2007. Mike Gravel didn't conduct an active campaign in Iowa either.

The 2008 Iowa Caucuses saw a record turnout for both parties; the Democrats drew more than 239,000 voters, almost double the Republican turnout. Entrance polling indicated that a significant portion of the turnout came from first-time caucus attendees, as well as attendees under the age of 30; two groups of voters that primarily lent their support to Barack Obama. Women, previously expected to largely back Hillary Clinton, split their vote between Clinton and Obama, the latter of whom actually received slightly more support. In the aftermath of the results from the Iowa Caucuses, Chris Dodd and Joe Biden dropped out of the presidential race.

As a result of the Iowa Caucus, Barack Obama received a significant surge of support in the next competition, the New Hampshire Democratic Primary five days after. In New Hampshire pre-primary polls conducted from January 4 to January 6, 2008, Obama enjoyed a 13-point lead over Clinton.

=== County convention results ===
Convention date: March 15, 2008

National pledged delegates determined: 0 (of 45)

2008 Iowa Democratic Presidential County Convention Results
Party	Candidate	Votes (State Delegate Equivalents)	Percentage	Pledged National Delegates (expected on March 15)
Democratic	Barack Obama	1,299	51.96%	25
Democratic	Hillary Clinton	802	32.08%	14
Democratic	John Edwards	388	15.52%	6
Democratic	Uncommitted	11	0.42%	0
Totals		2,500	100.00%	45

=== District convention results ===
District convention date: April 26, 2008

National pledged delegates determined: 29 (of 45)

Iowa Democratic Presidential District Convention Results – 2008
Party	Candidate	Pledged District Delegates (as per April 26)	Percentage	Pledged National Delegates (expected on April 26)
Democratic	Barack Obama	16	55.17%	24
Democratic	Hillary Clinton	9	31.03%	14
Democratic	John Edwards	4	13.79%	7
Totals		29	100.00%	45

On June 3, the Obama Campaign announced that all 4 national delegates previously pledged to former Senator John Edwards, elected by four Iowan congressional districts (CD1+CD2+CD3+CD5), had committed instead to vote for Senator Obama at the 2008 Democratic National Convention.

Iowa Democratic Presidential District Convention Results – 2008
Party	Candidate	Pledged District Delegates (as per June 3)	Percentage	Pledged National Delegates (expected on June 3)
Democratic	Barack Obama	20	68.97%	31
Democratic	Hillary Clinton	9	31.03%	14
Democratic	John Edwards	0	0%	0
Totals		29	100.00%	45

=== State convention results ===
State convention date: June 28, 2008

National pledged delegates determined: 45 (of 45)

Iowa Democratic Presidential State Convention Results – 2008
Party	Candidate	Pledged District Delegates	Pledged At Large State Delegates	Pledged PLEO Statewide Delegates	Total pledged National Delegates
Democratic	Barack Obama	20	10	6	36
Democratic	Hillary Clinton	9	0	0	9
Democratic	John Edwards	0	0	0	0
Totals		29	10	6	45

In addition to the above 45 pledged national delegates, the state convention will also send the following 12 uncommitted superdelegates to the 2008 Democratic National Convention: 6 Democratic National Committee members, 1 Senator, 3 House Representatives, 1 Governor and 1 Unpledged "add-on" selected at the state convention.

== Analysis ==
Barack Obama scored a major victory in the Iowa Democratic Caucuses due to a number of factors. According to exit polls, 93 percent of voters in the Iowa Democratic Caucus were Caucasian and 33 percent voted for Obama, 27 percent for Clinton, and 24 percent for Edwards; 4 percent of voters were African American and 72 percent voted for Obama, 16 percent for Clinton, and 8 percent for Edwards; 3 percent represented other races and they went 49 percent for Obama, 26 percent for Clinton, 10 percent for Richardson, and 5 percent for Edwards. Obama also won young voters ages 17–44 with 52 percent of the vote compared to 16 percent for both Clinton and Edwards. Edwards won middle-age voters ages 45–59 with 30 percent while Obama received 29 percent and Clinton took in 26 percent of their support. Clinton did best among elderly voters ages 60 and over with 40 percent of the vote while Edwards received 27 percent and Obama took in 19.5 percent of their support. Obama won self-identified Democrats by a margin of 32-31-23 (Obama-Clinton-Edwards), Independents backed Obama 41-23-17 (Obama-Edwards-Clinton), as well as self-identified Republicans who supported Obama 44-32-10 (Obama-Edwards-Clinton). Obama also won moderates and liberals but Edwards won conservatives. Socioeconomic class was not really a factor in how voters made their decisions, as Obama won all groups of family incomes.

Obama performed best in Eastern Iowa, which is considered to be the more liberal part of the state, and Central Iowa which is considered to be the more moderate part of the state. Clinton performed best in Western Iowa, which is considered to be the most conservative part of the state.

== See also ==
- 2008 Democratic Party presidential primaries
- Iowa caucuses
- 2008 Iowa Republican presidential caucuses
