= 2008 United States presidential election in Texas =

- November 4, 2008
- Turnout: 59.5% (of registered voters) ▲45.5% (of voting age population)

Nominee	John McCain	Barack Obama
Party	Republican	Democratic
Home state	Arizona	Illinois
Running mate	Sarah Palin	Joe Biden
Electoral vote	34	0
Popular vote	4,479,328	3,528,633
Percentage	55.38%	43.63%

McCain
50–60%
60–70%
70–80%
80–90%
90–100%
Obama
50–60%
60–70%
70–80%
80–90%
90–100%
President before election
George W. Bush
Republican
Elected President
Barack Obama
Democratic

The 2008 United States presidential election in Texas took place on November 4, 2008, and was part of the 2008 United States presidential election. Voters chose 34 representatives, or electors to the Electoral College, who voted for president and vice president.

Prior to the election, all news organizations considered this a state McCain would win, or a safe red state. Polling throughout the state showed McCain consistently and substantially leading Obama. On Election Day, McCain easily won the state, although his margin of victory was significantly less than that of George W. Bush in 2000 or 2004. This was the first election since 1996 in which the margin of victory was less than one million votes. Regardless, with its 34 electoral votes, Texas was the largest prize for McCain in 2008.

This election marked the last time (through the 2024 presidential election) that the Democratic candidate won Brewster County. It was also the last in which Kenedy County voted for the winning candidate until 2024.

== Primaries ==
- 2008 Texas Democratic presidential primary and caucuses
- 2008 Texas Republican presidential primary

== Campaign ==
=== Predictions ===
There were 16 news organizations who made state-by-state predictions of the election. Here are their last predictions before election day:

Source	Ranking
D.C. Political Report	Likely R
Cook Political Report	Solid R
The Takeaway	Solid R
Electoral-vote.com	Solid R
Washington Post	Solid R
Politico	Solid R
RealClearPolitics	Solid R
FiveThirtyEight	Solid R
CQ Politics	Solid R
The New York Times	Solid R
CNN	Safe R
NPR	Solid R
MSNBC	Solid R
Fox News	Likely R
Associated Press	Likely R
Rasmussen Reports	Safe R

=== Polling ===
McCain won every single pre-election poll. The final 3 polls averaged McCain leading 52% to 41%.

=== Fundraising ===
Obama raised $20,424,500. McCain raised $17,990,153.

=== Advertising and visits ===
Obama and his interest groups spent $9,917,565. McCain and his interest groups spent $33,983. Both campaigns visited the state twice.

== Analysis ==
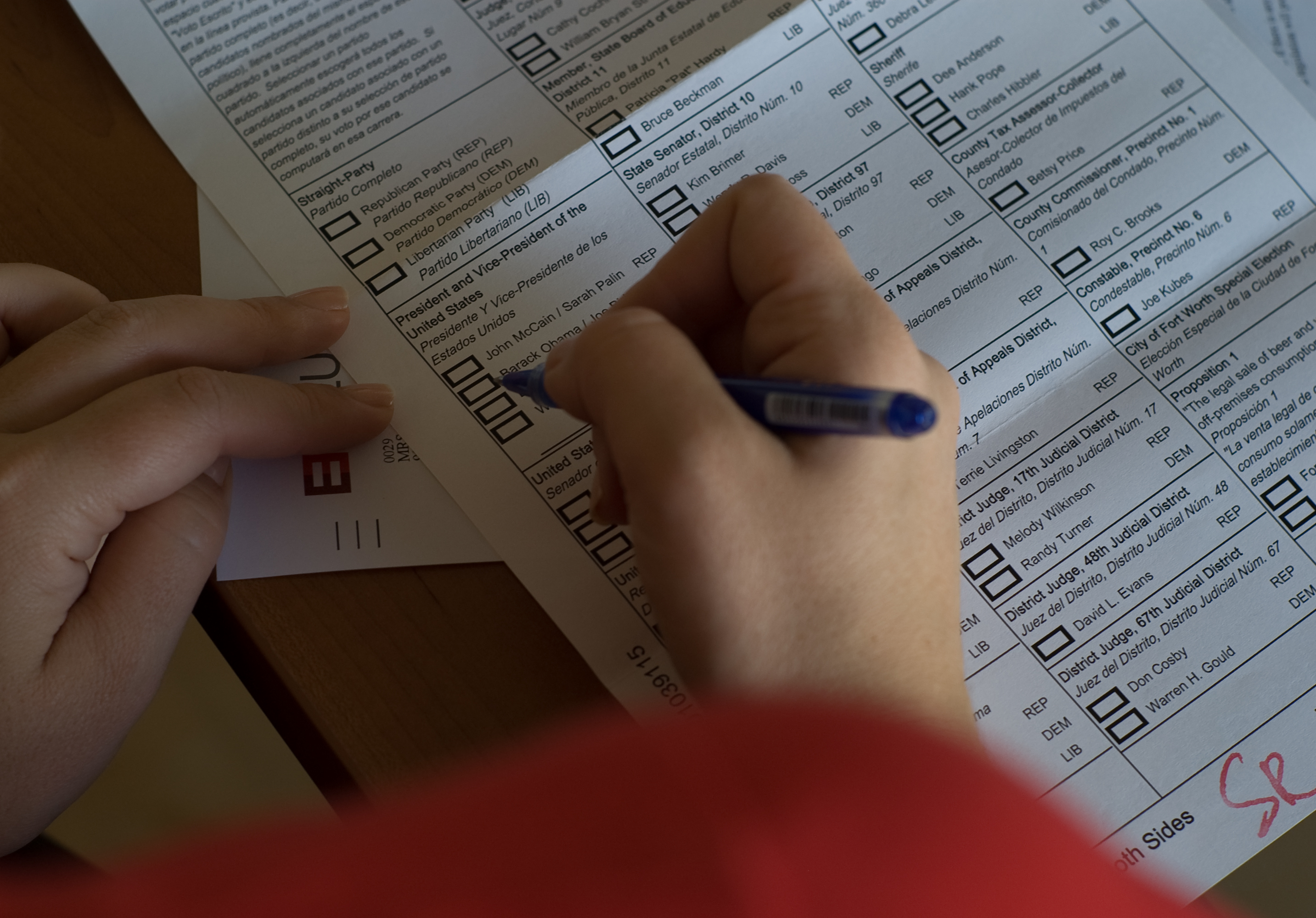
Voter casting a ballot in Texas

Texas, split between the south and southwest regions of the United States, has become a consistently Republican state at all levels and is the home state of then President George W. Bush. Economically and racially diverse, Texas includes a very large swath of the Bible Belt, a region in which many voters, especially those in rural areas, identify as born-again or evangelical Christians, and tend to vote Republican due to their socially conservative views. Although once part of the Solid South, Texas has not voted for a Democratic presidential nominee since Jimmy Carter in 1976.

McCain did well throughout the state, winning the vast majority of counties by double digits. He took almost every county in Eastern Texas, including many traditionally-Democratic areas. All the suburbs of the major cities voted Republican by large margins. He also dominated the Texas Panhandle (including Amarillo), the Permian Basin (including Midland and Odessa) and the South Plains (including Lubbock), three of the most conservative regions in the country. He won these three regions by margins of three-to-one—his largest margin of victory in the entire country. These areas had been among the first in Texas where the old-line conservative Democrats started splitting their tickets and voting Republican nationally; some counties in this region haven't supported a Democrat since Harry S. Truman in 1948. King County, a thinly populated county near the Panhandle, gave McCain 92.64% of the vote to Obama's 4.91%, McCain's best margin in any county in the nation.

Despite the expected loss, Obama improved substantially upon John Kerry's performance in 2004, narrowing the margin of victory from 22.83% down to 11.77%. He was able to flip major urban counties such as Dallas, Bexar and Harris counties—home to the cities of Dallas, San Antonio, and Houston respectively. Dallas and Harris had been among the first areas of the state to turn Republican, largely due to an influx of Northern expatriates in the 1940s and 1950s. Neither county had supported a Democrat for president since 1964. Bexar had last gone Democratic in 1996. A strong turnout of minority voters gave Obama the edge in these three counties. Obama also performed strongly in Travis County, which contains the state capital and liberal bastion of Austin; El Paso County, which contains the city of El Paso, due in large part to heavy support by Hispanics; and many of the Latino-majority counties in the Rio Grande Valley along the border with Mexico, which have strongly supported Democrats for decades. Although Obama lost Tarrant county, he did do well in the southern and eastern parts of Fort Worth and the eastern part of Arlington.

During the same election, incumbent Republican U.S. Senator John Cornyn was reelected with 54.82% of the vote to Democrat Rick Noriega’s 42.84%. Libertarian Yvonne Adams Schick received the remaining 2.34%. Republicans also knocked off a Democratic incumbent from Texas in the U.S. House of Representatives. At the state level, however, Democrats picked up three seats in the Texas House of Representatives and one seat in the Texas Senate.

== Results ==
2008 United States presidential election in Texas
Party	Candidate	Running mate	Votes	Percentage	Electoral votes
Republican	John McCain	Sarah Palin	4,479,328	55.45%	34
Democratic	Barack Obama	Joe Biden	3,528,633	43.68%	0
Libertarian	Bob Barr	Wayne Allyn Root	56,116	0.69%	0
Independent	Ralph Nader	Matt Gonzalez	5,751	0.07%	0
Constitution	Chuck Baldwin	Darrell Castle	5,708	0.07%	0
Green	Cynthia McKinney	Rosa Clemente	909	0.01%	0
Others	-	-	1,350	0.02%	0
Totals			8,086,952	100.00%	34
Voter turnout (voting age population)					46.8%

=== By county ===
County	John McCain Republican		Barack Obama Democratic		Various candidates Other parties		Margin		Total
County	#	%	#	%	#	%	#	%	Total
Anderson	11,884	71.35%	4,630	27.80%	141	0.85%	7,254	43.55%	16,655
Andrews	3,816	82.44%	790	17.07%	23	0.49%	3,026	65.37%	4,629
Angelina	19,569	67.13%	9,379	32.17%	205	0.70%	10,190	34.96%	29,153
Aransas	6,693	68.45%	3,006	30.74%	79	0.81%	3,687	37.71%	9,778
Archer	3,595	82.36%	740	16.95%	30	0.69%	2,855	65.41%	4,365
Armstrong	856	86.46%	128	12.93%	6	0.61%	728	73.53%	990
Atascosa	5,462	54.96%	4,415	44.43%	61	0.61%	1,047	10.53%	9,938
Austin	8,786	74.96%	2,821	24.07%	114	0.97%	5,965	50.89%	11,721
Bailey	1,618	69.86%	682	29.45%	16	0.69%	936	40.41%	2,316
Bandera	6,935	74.59%	2,250	24.20%	112	1.21%	4,685	50.39%	9,297
Bastrop	13,817	53.02%	11,687	44.84%	558	2.14%	2,130	8.18%	26,062
Baylor	1,262	76.81%	366	22.28%	15	0.91%	896	54.53%	1,643
Bee	4,471	54.81%	3,645	44.69%	41	0.50%	826	10.12%	8,157
Bell	49,242	54.36%	40,413	44.61%	935	1.03%	8,829	9.75%	90,590
Bexar	246,275	46.69%	275,527	52.23%	5,690	1.08%	-29,252	-5.54%	527,492
Blanco	3,418	69.20%	1,467	29.70%	54	1.10%	1,951	39.50%	4,939
Borden	316	87.53%	40	11.08%	5	1.39%	276	76.45%	361
Bosque	5,762	75.36%	1,797	23.50%	87	1.14%	3,965	51.86%	7,646
Bowie	24,162	68.67%	10,815	30.74%	209	0.59%	13,347	37.93%	35,186
Brazoria	67,515	64.34%	36,480	34.76%	945	0.90%	31,035	29.58%	104,940
Brazos	37,465	63.85%	20,502	34.94%	706	1.21%	16,963	28.91%	58,673
Brewster	1,855	47.56%	1,970	50.51%	75	1.93%	-115	-2.95%	3,900
Briscoe	617	74.34%	205	24.70%	8	0.96%	412	49.64%	830
Brooks	556	24.08%	1,747	75.66%	6	0.26%	-1,191	-51.58%	2,309
Brown	12,052	79.95%	2,822	18.72%	200	1.33%	9,230	61.23%	15,074
Burleson	4,547	68.22%	2,053	30.80%	65	0.98%	2,494	37.42%	6,665
Burnet	12,059	71.38%	4,608	27.28%	226	1.34%	7,451	44.10%	16,893
Caldwell	6,107	52.43%	5,403	46.39%	138	1.18%	704	6.04%	11,648
Calhoun	4,106	59.69%	2,729	39.67%	44	0.64%	1,377	20.02%	6,879
Callahan	4,589	80.28%	1,063	18.60%	64	1.12%	3,526	61.68%	5,716
Cameron	26,671	35.06%	48,480	63.72%	926	1.22%	-21,809	-28.66%	76,077
Camp	2,798	61.27%	1,734	37.97%	35	0.76%	1,064	23.30%	4,567
Carson	2,548	85.50%	406	13.62%	26	0.88%	2,142	71.88%	2,980
Cass	8,279	69.89%	3,490	29.46%	77	0.65%	4,789	40.43%	11,846
Castro	1,562	68.18%	719	31.38%	10	0.44%	843	36.80%	2,291
Chambers	9,988	75.14%	3,188	23.98%	116	0.88%	6,800	51.16%	13,292
Cherokee	11,695	71.24%	4,610	28.08%	112	0.68%	7,085	43.16%	16,417
Childress	1,782	77.61%	497	21.65%	17	0.74%	1,285	55.96%	2,296
Clay	4,213	78.91%	1,085	20.32%	41	0.77%	3,128	58.59%	5,339
Cochran	758	71.71%	284	26.87%	15	1.42%	474	44.84%	1,057
Coke	1,252	79.80%	299	19.06%	18	1.14%	953	60.74%	1,569
Coleman	3,011	81.33%	643	17.37%	48	1.30%	2,368	63.96%	3,702
Collin	184,897	62.16%	109,047	36.66%	3,513	1.18%	75,850	25.50%	297,457
Collingsworth	943	78.91%	234	19.58%	18	1.51%	709	59.33%	1,195
Colorado	5,795	69.38%	2,508	30.03%	50	0.59%	3,287	39.35%	8,353
Comal	35,233	73.01%	12,384	25.66%	644	1.33%	22,849	47.35%	48,261
Comanche	3,813	73.09%	1,334	25.57%	70	1.34%	2,479	47.52%	5,217
Concho	807	74.93%	257	23.86%	13	1.21%	550	51.07%	1,077
Cooke	11,871	78.86%	3,051	20.27%	132	0.87%	8,820	58.59%	15,054
Coryell	11,550	63.00%	6,619	36.11%	163	0.89%	4,931	26.89%	18,332
Cottle	509	72.20%	187	26.52%	9	1.28%	322	45.68%	705
Crane	1,119	76.96%	319	21.94%	16	1.10%	800	55.02%	1,454
Crockett	1,026	66.41%	512	33.14%	7	0.45%	514	33.27%	1,545
Crosby	1,221	63.79%	684	35.74%	9	0.47%	537	28.05%	1,914
Culberson	257	33.86%	492	64.82%	10	1.32%	-235	-30.96%	759
Dallam	1,269	79.86%	302	19.01%	18	1.13%	967	60.85%	1,589
Dallas	310,000	41.89%	422,989	57.15%	7,085	0.96%	-112,989	-15.26%	740,074
Dawson	2,906	70.95%	1,152	28.13%	38	0.92%	1,754	42.82%	4,096
Deaf Smith	3,466	73.06%	1,247	26.29%	31	0.65%	2,219	46.77%	4,744
Delta	1,580	72.25%	589	26.93%	18	0.82%	991	45.32%	2,187
Denton	149,935	61.63%	91,160	37.47%	2,168	0.90%	58,775	24.16%	243,263
DeWitt	4,888	73.77%	1,716	25.90%	22	0.33%	3,172	47.87%	6,626
Dickens	730	75.10%	234	24.07%	8	0.83%	496	51.03%	972
Dimmit	874	24.37%	2,692	75.05%	21	0.58%	-1,818	-50.68%	3,587
Donley	1,374	81.30%	291	17.22%	25	1.48%	1,083	64.08%	1,690
Duval	1,076	24.40%	3,298	74.80%	35	0.80%	-2,222	-50.40%	4,409
Eastland	5,165	79.35%	1,271	19.53%	73	1.12%	3,894	59.82%	6,509
Ector	26,199	73.49%	9,123	25.59%	329	0.92%	17,076	47.90%	35,651
Edwards	673	65.02%	346	33.43%	16	1.55%	327	31.59%	1,035
El Paso	61,783	33.28%	122,021	65.73%	1,826	0.99%	-60,238	-32.45%	185,630
Ellis	38,078	70.71%	15,333	28.47%	442	0.82%	22,745	42.24%	53,853
Erath	10,768	76.81%	3,128	22.31%	123	0.88%	7,640	54.50%	14,019
Falls	3,328	59.44%	2,225	39.74%	46	0.82%	1,103	19.70%	5,599
Fannin	8,092	69.20%	3,464	29.62%	138	1.18%	4,628	39.58%	11,694
Fayette	7,582	70.43%	3,014	28.00%	169	1.57%	4,568	42.43%	10,765
Fisher	1,083	60.71%	687	38.51%	14	0.78%	396	22.20%	1,784
Floyd	1,784	70.77%	730	28.96%	7	0.27%	1,054	41.81%	2,521
Foard	327	60.78%	198	36.80%	13	2.42%	129	23.98%	538
Fort Bend	103,206	50.89%	98,368	48.50%	1,248	0.61%	4,838	2.39%	202,822
Franklin	3,392	75.53%	1,036	23.07%	63	1.40%	2,356	52.46%	4,491
Freestone	5,205	71.42%	2,034	27.91%	49	0.67%	3,171	43.51%	7,288
Frio	1,644	40.47%	2,405	59.21%	13	0.32%	-761	-18.74%	4,062
Gaines	3,385	83.23%	650	15.98%	32	0.79%	2,735	67.25%	4,067
Galveston	62,258	59.29%	41,805	39.81%	941	0.90%	20,453	19.48%	105,004
Garza	1,356	77.49%	375	21.43%	19	1.08%	981	56.06%	1,750
Gillespie	9,563	77.51%	2,576	20.88%	199	1.61%	6,987	56.63%	12,338
Glasscock	502	90.13%	52	9.34%	3	0.53%	450	80.79%	557
Goliad	2,298	62.87%	1,329	36.36%	28	0.77%	969	26.51%	3,655
Gonzales	4,076	64.83%	2,167	34.47%	44	0.70%	1,909	30.36%	6,287
Gray	6,924	85.13%	1,153	14.18%	56	0.69%	5,771	70.95%	8,133
Grayson	31,136	68.33%	13,900	30.51%	528	1.16%	17,236	37.82%	45,564
Gregg	29,203	68.54%	13,166	30.90%	241	0.56%	16,037	37.64%	42,610
Grimes	5,562	66.83%	2,704	32.49%	56	0.68%	2,858	34.34%	8,322
Guadalupe	30,869	64.91%	16,156	33.97%	535	1.12%	14,713	30.94%	47,560
Hale	7,171	72.12%	2,708	27.24%	64	0.64%	4,463	44.88%	9,943
Hall	930	73.58%	324	25.63%	10	0.79%	606	47.95%	1,264
Hamilton	2,876	76.12%	863	22.84%	39	1.04%	2,013	53.28%	3,778
Hansford	1,847	87.87%	240	11.42%	15	0.71%	1,607	76.45%	2,102
Hardeman	1,199	75.17%	373	23.39%	23	1.44%	826	51.78%	1,595
Hardin	16,603	80.20%	3,939	19.03%	160	0.77%	12,664	61.17%	20,702
Harris	571,883	48.82%	590,982	50.45%	8,607	0.73%	-19,099	-1.63%	1,171,472
Harrison	17,103	65.38%	8,887	33.97%	168	0.65%	8,216	31.41%	26,158
Hartley	1,711	86.20%	250	12.59%	24	1.21%	1,461	73.61%	1,985
Haskell	1,388	65.60%	699	33.03%	29	1.37%	689	32.57%	2,116
Hays	29,638	50.19%	28,431	48.15%	983	1.66%	1,207	2.04%	59,052
Hemphill	1,345	85.67%	216	13.76%	9	0.57%	1,129	71.91%	1,570
Henderson	20,857	71.94%	7,913	27.29%	223	0.77%	12,944	44.65%	28,993
Hidalgo	39,668	30.29%	90,261	68.92%	1,043	0.79%	-50,593	-38.63%	130,972
Hill	9,264	70.25%	3,811	28.90%	113	0.85%	5,453	41.35%	13,188
Hockley	5,795	75.80%	1,797	23.51%	53	0.69%	3,998	52.29%	7,645
Hood	17,299	76.46%	5,087	22.48%	238	1.06%	12,212	53.98%	22,624
Hopkins	9,299	71.98%	3,530	27.32%	90	0.70%	5,769	44.66%	12,919
Houston	5,872	68.09%	2,656	30.80%	96	1.11%	3,216	37.29%	8,624
Howard	7,029	72.55%	2,545	26.27%	115	1.18%	4,484	46.28%	9,689
Hudspeth	458	51.00%	430	47.88%	10	1.12%	28	3.12%	898
Hunt	20,573	69.68%	8,594	29.11%	357	1.21%	11,979	40.57%	29,524
Hutchinson	7,361	84.02%	1,322	15.09%	78	0.89%	6,039	68.93%	8,761
Irion	644	78.82%	164	20.07%	9	1.11%	480	58.75%	817
Jack	2,528	83.63%	470	15.55%	25	0.82%	2,058	68.08%	3,023
Jackson	3,723	73.46%	1,301	25.67%	44	0.87%	2,422	47.79%	5,068
Jasper	9,022	70.62%	3,658	28.63%	96	0.75%	5,364	41.99%	12,776
Jeff Davis	749	60.60%	468	37.86%	19	1.54%	281	22.74%	1,236
Jefferson	42,905	48.52%	44,888	50.76%	637	0.72%	-1,983	-2.24%	88,430
Jim Hogg	472	26.01%	1,336	73.61%	7	0.38%	-864	-47.60%	1,815
Jim Wells	4,841	41.69%	6,706	57.75%	65	0.56%	-1,865	-16.06%	11,612
Johnson	36,685	73.30%	12,912	25.80%	453	0.90%	23,773	47.50%	50,050
Jones	4,203	72.37%	1,528	26.31%	77	1.32%	2,675	46.06%	5,808
Karnes	2,736	60.44%	1,760	38.88%	31	0.68%	976	21.56%	4,527
Kaufman	23,735	67.53%	11,161	31.76%	249	0.71%	12,574	35.77%	35,145
Kendall	12,971	77.46%	3,599	21.49%	176	1.05%	9,372	55.97%	16,746
Kenedy	94	46.53%	108	53.47%	0	0.00%	-14	-6.94%	202
Kent	342	76.34%	99	22.10%	7	1.56%	243	54.24%	448
Kerr	16,752	74.27%	5,570	24.69%	234	1.04%	11,182	49.58%	22,556
Kimble	1,487	80.68%	342	18.56%	14	0.76%	1,145	62.12%	1,843
King	151	92.64%	8	4.91%	4	2.45%	143	87.73%	163
Kinney	907	58.48%	633	40.81%	11	0.71%	274	17.67%	1,551
Kleberg	4,540	45.97%	5,256	53.22%	80	0.81%	-716	-7.25%	9,876
Knox	986	72.08%	367	26.83%	15	1.09%	619	45.25%	1,368
Lamar	12,952	70.54%	5,243	28.55%	167	0.91%	7,709	41.99%	18,362
Lamb	3,344	73.90%	1,156	25.55%	25	0.55%	2,188	48.35%	4,525
Lampasas	5,651	74.02%	1,903	24.93%	80	1.05%	3,748	49.09%	7,634
La Salle	714	40.20%	1,052	59.23%	10	0.57%	-338	-19.03%	1,776
Lavaca	6,293	76.30%	1,869	22.66%	86	1.04%	4,424	53.64%	8,248
Lee	4,312	67.62%	2,000	31.36%	65	1.02%	2,312	36.26%	6,377
Leon	5,566	79.05%	1,418	20.14%	57	0.81%	4,148	58.91%	7,041
Liberty	15,448	71.23%	5,991	27.62%	248	1.15%	9,457	43.61%	21,687
Limestone	5,079	66.20%	2,516	32.79%	77	1.01%	2,563	33.41%	7,672
Lipscomb	1,093	87.02%	155	12.34%	8	0.64%	938	74.68%	1,256
Live Oak	3,095	74.11%	1,048	25.10%	33	0.79%	2,047	49.01%	4,176
Llano	7,281	75.62%	2,250	23.37%	98	1.01%	5,031	52.25%	9,629
Loving	67	84.81%	12	15.19%	0	0.00%	55	69.62%	79
Lubbock	66,304	67.98%	30,486	31.26%	744	0.76%	35,818	36.72%	97,534
Lynn	1,473	69.61%	627	29.63%	16	0.76%	846	39.98%	2,116
Madison	2,891	70.96%	1,146	28.13%	37	0.91%	1,745	42.83%	4,074
Marion	2,567	60.37%	1,644	38.66%	41	0.97%	923	21.71%	4,252
Martin	1,389	80.99%	314	18.31%	12	0.70%	1,075	62.68%	1,715
Mason	1,544	72.80%	546	25.74%	31	1.46%	998	47.06%	2,121
Matagorda	7,835	63.32%	4,440	35.88%	98	0.80%	3,395	27.44%	12,373
Maverick	2,316	21.17%	8,554	78.20%	69	0.63%	-6,238	-57.03%	10,939
McCulloch	2,263	75.18%	728	24.19%	19	0.63%	1,535	50.99%	3,010
McLennan	49,044	61.56%	29,998	37.65%	632	0.79%	19,046	23.91%	79,674
McMullen	400	74.49%	132	24.58%	5	0.93%	268	49.91%	537
Medina	10,480	66.59%	5,147	32.71%	110	0.70%	5,333	33.88%	15,737
Menard	712	69.94%	295	28.98%	11	1.08%	417	40.96%	1,018
Midland	36,155	78.13%	9,691	20.94%	428	0.93%	26,464	57.19%	46,274
Milam	5,217	62.43%	3,044	36.42%	96	1.15%	2,173	26.01%	8,357
Mills	1,753	80.52%	398	18.28%	26	1.20%	1,355	62.24%	2,177
Mitchell	1,815	74.66%	586	24.11%	30	1.23%	1,229	50.55%	2,431
Montague	6,245	78.55%	1,597	20.09%	108	1.36%	4,648	58.46%	7,950
Montgomery	119,884	75.76%	36,703	23.19%	1,664	1.05%	83,181	52.57%	158,251
Moore	4,282	78.76%	1,123	20.65%	32	0.59%	3,159	58.11%	5,437
Morris	3,158	60.18%	2,055	39.16%	35	0.66%	1,103	21.02%	5,248
Motley	522	87.88%	67	11.28%	5	0.84%	455	76.60%	594
Nacogdoches	14,828	63.39%	8,393	35.88%	170	0.73%	6,435	27.51%	23,391
Navarro	10,810	66.23%	5,400	33.09%	111	0.68%	5,410	33.14%	16,321
Newton	3,446	65.51%	1,751	33.29%	63	1.20%	1,695	32.22%	5,260
Nolan	3,485	68.83%	1,521	30.04%	57	1.13%	1,964	38.79%	5,063
Nueces	52,391	51.75%	47,912	47.33%	927	0.92%	4,479	4.42%	101,230
Ochiltree	2,851	91.70%	243	7.82%	15	0.48%	2,608	83.88%	3,109
Oldham	813	88.37%	102	11.09%	5	0.54%	711	77.28%	920
Orange	21,509	73.14%	7,646	26.00%	251	0.86%	13,863	47.14%	29,406
Palo Pinto	7,264	73.45%	2,499	25.27%	127	1.28%	4,765	48.18%	9,890
Panola	7,582	74.22%	2,586	25.31%	48	0.47%	4,996	48.91%	10,216
Parker	36,974	77.11%	10,502	21.90%	475	0.99%	26,472	55.21%	47,951
Parmer	2,969	79.96%	719	19.36%	25	0.68%	2,250	60.60%	3,713
Pecos	2,480	61.85%	1,476	36.81%	54	1.34%	1,004	25.04%	4,010
Polk	13,731	68.15%	6,230	30.92%	188	0.93%	7,501	37.23%	20,149
Potter	20,761	69.17%	8,939	29.78%	313	1.05%	11,822	39.39%	30,013
Presidio	489	27.83%	1,252	71.26%	16	0.91%	-763	-43.43%	1,757
Rains	3,146	74.27%	1,048	24.74%	42	0.99%	2,098	49.53%	4,236
Randall	41,948	80.93%	9,468	18.27%	416	0.80%	32,480	62.66%	51,832
Reagan	795	79.98%	197	19.82%	2	0.20%	598	60.16%	994
Real	1,238	76.04%	375	23.03%	15	0.93%	863	53.01%	1,628
Red River	3,461	68.51%	1,539	30.46%	52	1.03%	1,922	38.05%	5,052
Reeves	1,445	46.96%	1,606	52.19%	26	0.85%	-161	-5.23%	3,077
Refugio	1,855	56.88%	1,382	42.38%	24	0.74%	473	14.50%	3,261
Roberts	477	92.08%	41	7.92%	0	0.00%	436	84.16%	518
Robertson	3,980	59.31%	2,675	39.87%	55	0.82%	1,305	19.44%	6,710
Rockwall	23,300	72.45%	8,492	26.40%	370	1.15%	14,808	46.05%	32,162
Runnels	3,118	80.63%	720	18.62%	29	0.75%	2,398	62.01%	3,867
Rusk	13,646	72.89%	4,983	26.62%	93	0.49%	8,663	46.27%	18,722
Sabine	3,749	76.92%	1,077	22.10%	48	0.98%	2,672	54.82%	4,874
San Augustine	2,342	63.04%	1,328	35.75%	45	1.21%	1,014	27.29%	3,715
San Jacinto	6,151	68.66%	2,721	30.38%	86	0.96%	3,430	38.28%	8,958
San Patricio	12,404	57.97%	8,854	41.38%	138	0.65%	3,550	16.59%	21,396
San Saba	1,941	79.00%	487	19.82%	29	1.18%	1,454	59.18%	2,457
Schleicher	970	74.39%	324	24.85%	10	0.76%	646	49.54%	1,304
Scurry	4,414	79.26%	1,088	19.54%	67	1.20%	3,326	59.72%	5,569
Shackelford	1,284	85.32%	208	13.82%	13	0.86%	1,076	71.50%	1,505
Shelby	6,630	71.91%	2,548	27.64%	42	0.45%	4,082	44.27%	9,220
Sherman	884	86.67%	127	12.45%	9	0.88%	757	74.22%	1,020
Smith	55,187	69.36%	23,726	29.82%	648	0.82%	31,461	39.54%	79,561
Somervell	2,677	75.77%	799	22.62%	57	1.61%	1,878	53.15%	3,533
Starr	1,492	15.24%	8,274	84.50%	26	0.26%	-6,782	-69.26%	9,792
Stephens	2,869	81.37%	626	17.75%	31	0.88%	2,243	63.62%	3,526
Sterling	520	84.01%	97	15.67%	2	0.32%	423	68.34%	619
Stonewall	524	71.29%	206	28.03%	5	0.68%	318	43.26%	735
Sutton	1,189	75.35%	381	24.14%	8	0.51%	808	51.21%	1,578
Swisher	1,683	66.39%	813	32.07%	39	1.54%	870	34.32%	2,535
Tarrant	348,420	55.43%	274,880	43.73%	5,253	0.84%	73,540	11.70%	628,553
Taylor	34,317	72.34%	12,690	26.75%	432	0.91%	21,627	45.59%	47,439
Terrell	323	62.24%	186	35.84%	10	1.92%	137	26.40%	519
Terry	2,879	67.27%	1,379	32.22%	22	0.51%	1,500	35.05%	4,280
Throckmorton	671	80.07%	166	19.81%	1	0.12%	505	60.26%	838
Titus	6,028	65.20%	3,145	34.02%	72	0.78%	2,883	31.18%	9,245
Tom Green	27,362	70.41%	11,158	28.71%	341	0.88%	16,204	41.70%	38,861
Travis	136,981	34.25%	254,017	63.52%	8,890	2.23%	-117,036	-29.27%	399,888
Trinity	4,095	67.39%	1,925	31.68%	57	0.93%	2,170	35.71%	6,077
Tyler	5,644	71.35%	2,166	27.38%	100	1.27%	3,478	43.97%	7,910
Upshur	11,222	74.00%	3,790	24.99%	152	1.01%	7,432	49.01%	15,164
Upton	898	75.02%	288	24.06%	11	0.92%	610	50.96%	1,197
Uvalde	4,590	52.36%	4,126	47.07%	50	0.57%	464	5.29%	8,766
Val Verde	5,752	44.87%	6,982	54.46%	86	0.67%	-1,230	-9.59%	12,820
Van Zandt	15,734	77.15%	4,505	22.09%	156	0.76%	11,229	55.06%	20,395
Victoria	19,878	66.22%	9,832	32.75%	310	1.03%	10,046	33.47%	30,020
Walker	11,623	60.71%	7,334	38.31%	189	0.98%	4,289	22.40%	19,146
Waller	8,265	53.30%	7,153	46.12%	90	0.58%	1,112	7.18%	15,508
Ward	2,667	74.04%	899	24.96%	36	1.00%	1,768	49.08%	3,602
Washington	10,176	70.78%	4,034	28.06%	167	1.16%	6,142	42.72%	14,377
Webb	13,119	28.02%	33,452	71.45%	250	0.53%	-20,333	-43.43%	46,821
Wharton	9,431	65.41%	4,937	34.24%	50	0.35%	4,494	31.17%	14,418
Wheeler	1,918	85.43%	314	13.99%	13	0.58%	1,604	71.44%	2,245
Wichita	31,731	69.01%	13,868	30.16%	383	0.83%	17,863	38.85%	45,982
Wilbarger	3,283	72.81%	1,196	26.52%	30	0.67%	2,087	46.29%	4,509
Willacy	1,456	29.70%	3,409	69.53%	38	0.77%	-1,953	-39.83%	4,903
Williamson	88,323	55.49%	67,691	42.53%	3,152	1.98%	20,632	12.96%	159,166
Wilson	10,904	66.63%	5,362	32.76%	100	0.61%	5,542	33.87%	16,366
Winkler	1,529	75.25%	477	23.47%	26	1.28%	1,052	51.78%	2,032
Wise	15,973	77.39%	4,471	21.66%	195	0.95%	11,502	55.73%	20,639
Wood	13,658	76.80%	4,010	22.55%	116	0.65%	9,648	54.25%	17,784
Yoakum	1,989	80.92%	450	18.31%	19	0.77%	1,539	62.61%	2,458
Young	5,942	81.34%	1,303	17.84%	60	0.82%	4,639	63.50%	7,305
Zapata	919	32.07%	1,939	67.66%	8	0.27%	-1,020	-35.59%	2,866
Zavala	596	15.38%	3,263	84.18%	17	0.44%	-2,667	-68.80%	3,876
Totals	4,479,328	55.38%	3,528,633	43.63%	79,830	0.99%	950,695	11.75%	8,087,791

Counties that flipped from Republican to Democratic

- Bexar (largest city: San Antonio)
- Brewster (largest city: Alpine)
- Cameron (largest community: Brownsville)
- Culberson (largest municipality: Van Horn)
- Dallas (largest city: Dallas)
- Frio (largest municipality: Pearsall)
- Harris (largest community: Houston)
- Kleberg (largest municipality: Kingsville)
- Reeves (largest municipality: Pecos)
- Val Verde (largest municipality: Del Rio)

=== By congressional district ===
John McCain carried 21 of the state's 32 congressional districts, including one district held by a Democrat.

District	McCain	Obama	Representative
1st	68.93%	30.53%	Louie Gohmert
2nd	59.75%	39.69%	Ted Poe
3rd	57.58%	41.73%	Sam Johnson
4th	69.10%	30.17%	Ralph Hall
5th	63.33%	36.05%	Jeb Hensarling
6th	59.77%	39.59%	Joe Barton
7th	58.36%	40.94%	John Culberson
8th	73.76%	25.53%	Kevin Brady
9th	22.54%	77.08%	Al Green
10th	54.96%	44.18%	Michael McCaul
11th	75.47%	23.75%	Mike Conaway
12th	62.90%	36.36%	Kay Granger
13th	76.54%	22.71%	Mac Thornberry
14th	66.27%	33.08%	Ron Paul
15th	39.63%	59.82%	Rubén Hinojosa
16th	33.57%	65.81%	Silvestre Reyes
17th	67.21%	32.02%	Chet Edwards
18th	22.19%	77.37%	Sheila Jackson Lee
19th	71.93%	27.36%	Randy Neugebauer
20th	35.65%	63.59%	Charlie Gonzalez
21st	58.49%	40.71%	Lamar S. Smith
22nd	58.23%	41.14%	Nick Lampson (110th Congress)
22nd	58.23%	41.14%	Pete Olson (111th Congress)
23rd	48.12%	50.92%	Ciro Rodriguez
24th	54.96%	44.37%	Kenny Marchant
25th	39.71%	59.15%	Lloyd Doggett
26th	58.00%	41.33%	Michael C. Burgess
27th	45.98%	53.32%	Solomon Ortiz
28th	43.53%	55.93%	Henry Cuellar
29th	37.73%	61.65%	Gene Green
30th	17.92%	81.69%	Eddie Bernice Johnson
31st	57.51%	41.53%	John Carter
32nd	53.03%	46.21%	Pete Sessions

== Electors ==
Technically the voters of Texas cast their ballots for electors: representatives to the Electoral College. Texas is allocated 34 electors because it has 32 congressional districts and 2 senators. All candidates who appear on the ballot or qualify to receive write-in votes must submit a list of 34 electors, who pledge to vote for their candidate and his or her running mate. Whoever wins the majority of votes in the state is awarded all 34 electoral votes. Their chosen electors then vote for president and vice president. Although electors are pledged to their candidate and running mate, they are not obligated to vote for them. An elector who votes for someone other than his or her candidate is known as a faithless elector.

The electors of each state and the District of Columbia met on December 15, 2008, to cast their votes for president and vice president. The Electoral College itself never meets as one body. Instead the electors from each state and the District of Columbia met in their respective capitols.

The following were the members of the Electoral College from the state. All 34 were pledged to John McCain and Sarah Palin:

1. Marcia Daughtrey
2. Virgil Vickery
3. Charlie O'Reilly
4. Brenda Zielke
5. Mary Darby
6. Melba McDow
7. Paul Pressler
8. James Wiggins
9. Deborah Cupples
10. Frank Alvarez
11. Russ Duerstine
12. Zan Prince
13. Bruce Harris
14. Gordon Starkenburg
15. Sandra Cararas
16. Donene O'Dell
17. Larry Lovelace
18. Nelda Eppes
19. Kenneth Corbin
20. Gene Ryder
21. Robert Hierynomus
22. Terese Raia
23. Arturo Martinez de Vara
24. Thomas Ferguson
25. Robert Long
26. Pat Peale
27. Joel Yowell
28. Judith Hooge
29. Giovanna Searcy
30. Patricia Ann Van Winkle
31. Ronny Risinger
32. Frank Eikenburg
33. Genny Hensz
34. Talmadge Heflin

== See also ==
- United States presidential elections in Texas
- Presidency of Barack Obama
