= American Leadership Project =

US political campaign group

- Founded: 2008
- Type: 527 group
- Location: (United States)
- Website: leadership-project.org

The American Leadership Project (ALP) was a political organization in the United States, active during the 2008 Democratic presidential primary elections and the subsequent presidential election. It was an unincorporated association organized under section 527 of the IRS code, formed in February 2008. The ALP did not endorse any candidate, and was not officially linked with any candidate's committee, but ran adverts before primary elections in the states of Texas, Ohio, Pennsylvania, and Indiana in support of Hillary Clinton and against Barack Obama. After the conclusion of the primary season, when Obama became the Democratic nominee, the organization ran several campaign ads against his Republican opponent John McCain.

== Spending ==
The group had been rumored to plan to spend around $10 million on ads in Texas, Ohio and Pennsylvania in the lead up to those U.S. state's 2008 Democratic primaries. By March 5, 2008, the group had raised US$1.2 million, including a one million dollar contribution from AFSCME, a labor union backing Clinton. In the end, the ALP aired $833,000 worth of pro-Clinton television ads in Texas and Ohio and had $300,000 remaining in the bank according to FEC filings on March 5.

The ALP disclosed their donors quarterly to the IRS, as required of a 527 organization. Because they engaged in electioneering communications, they were also required to disclose their donors and expenditures to the FEC within 24 hours of new communications.

== Legal disputes ==
Jason Kinney, a California political consultant that helped develop the group, said it relied on "a new and developing area of the law, but we've taken every step and are as confident as we can be that we are adhering to all of the regulations." Fred Wertheimer, president of Democracy 21, a campaign finance reform group, said of ALP, "This pop-up 527 group clearly has been created to spend unlimited soft money to influence the presidential election. As far as the duck test goes: It looks like a campaign ad; it sounds like a campaign ad; it's a campaign ad." Their first television advertisement stated, "If speeches could create jobs, we wouldn't be facing a recession", mirroring Clinton's argument that Obama's eloquence would not lead to real policy change.

Ohio lawyer Subodh Chandra, an Obama supporter, filed a complaint with the Federal Election Commission, calling on them to open an investigation, shut down the organization and seek criminal penalties against its directors and donors. He argued the organization allowed Clinton's backers to "cheat the system" and fund adverts for her campaign even though they had already donated the maximum $2,300 allowed by law to her campaign.

Democratic presidential candidate Senator Mike Gravel filed a further lawsuit against the ALP in an Ohio federal court, requesting that the organization be barred from airing a television ad in Ohio before the Ohio primary.

The group premiered two ads during the Texas Democratic primary comparing the two candidates' health care plans. Factcheck.org, which was quoted in the first ad, claimed it misrepresented what they had said about Clinton's plan. The group also criticized the second ad for selectively quoting an editorial from The Washington Post authored by Steven Pearlstein in a way that made the quote appear to be the paper's own editorial opinion.

== See also ==
- U.S. presidential election, 2008
- Hillary Clinton presidential campaign, 2008
- Fundraising for the 2008 United States presidential election
- 527 group
