= Roger Salazar (consultant) =

Media and crisis communications consultant

- Born: February 23, 1970
- Education: M.A., Political Management; B.A., Political Science
- Alma mater: University of Redlands, George Washington University
- Occupations: media and crisis communications consultant
- Spouse: Katrina Salazar
- Website: www.alzamedia.com

Roger Salazar is a media and crisis communications consultant based in Sacramento, California. Salazar is well known for his work in the White House under the Clinton Administration, working on the 2000 Gore campaign and as campaign press secretary for former California Governor Gray Davis.

== Education ==
Salazar graduated from Lodi High School in 1987. He went on to receive his Bachelor of Arts in political science at the University of Redlands in 1991, followed by his Masters of Arts in political management at George Washington University in 1995.

== Early political career ==
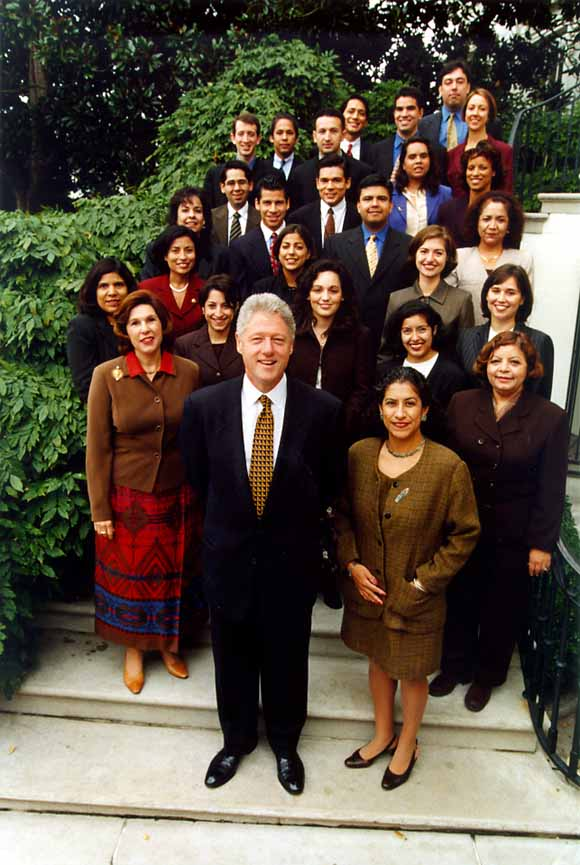
Salazar with President Clinton in 1998

In 1993, Salazar began his career within political media as the press secretary for U.S. Representative Lucille Roybal-Allard. While finishing his Masters of Arts in political management, he began an internship in President Clinton's White House and continued in various capacities as a white house press aide until 1998. Salazar served as deputy press secretary for the United States Department of Agriculture Secretary Daniel Glickman before returning to the White House as assistant press secretary until 1999. He worked in Vice President Al Gore's office for a brief period and served as Gore’s deputy spokesperson during his 2000 presidential campaign.

From 2000-2001 Salazar was the press aide for former California governor Gray Davis. Salazar served as the national campaign spokesman for Senator John Edwards' presidential campaign of 2004. In 2008, Salazar started the group, American Leadership Project (ALP), through a 527 IRS filing on February 15 to independently aid Hillary Clinton's presidential campaign.

== Career ==
In January 2003, Salazar joined Porter Novelli as a senior counselor. After John Edwards failed to win the Democratic nomination for president, Salazar left Porter Novelli to co-found AcostaSalazar LLC, a public relations and consulting firm, with Andrew Acosta. He served as a partner there until May 2012, when he joined Mercury Public Affairs, a political consulting and public affairs firm dealing in high-stakes public strategy. In February 2014, Salazar left his position as managing director at Mercury Public Affairs to open Alza Strategies. Alza, "rise" in Spanish, aims to reach more of California's Latino market with bilingual media relations, crisis communication, and public affairs services. He serves as president at Alza. In 2020, California Governor Gavin Newsom appointed Salazar to the California Off-Highway Motor Vehicle Recreation (OHMVR) Commission. Salazar was elected Chair of the OHMVR Commission in February 2024 and he was reappointed by the Governor in March 2024. He was a 2024 presidential elector, pledged to vote for Kamala Harris.

== Personal life ==
Salazar was born to farm workers in California's Central Valley. Salazar is married to Katrina Salazar who serves as chief financial officer of the California Correctional Peace Officers Association. In 2020, Katrina was re-appointed as a member of the California State Board of Accountancy by California Governor Gavin Newsom, after having previously been appointed to that board by Governor Jerry Brown in 2012. In 2016, the Sacramento Business Journal named Katrina Nonprofit CFO of the Year. Roger and Katrina have two children, Joshua and Alexandra. He was a member of the Board of Trustees of the University of Redlands, his alma mater, from May 2001 to May 2020. Salazar serves as Treasurer for the Sacramento Press Club and on the Board of Directors for the American Association of Political Consultants. An avid off-road enthusiast, Salazar is president of the Sierra Treasure Hunters 4 Wheel Drive Club in Sacramento, CA. Salazar is a Life Member of the California Four Wheel Drive Association and of the California Off-Road Vehicle Association and an associate member of Red Rock 4-Wheelers of Moab, UT.
