= 2016 Texas Democratic presidential primary =

- March 1, 2016

Candidate	Hillary Clinton	Bernie Sanders
Home state	New York	Vermont
Delegate count	147	75
Popular vote	936,004	476,547
Percentage	65.19%	33.19%
- Clinton: 30-40% 40-50% 50-60% 60-70% 70-80% 80-90% 90-100% Sanders: 30-40% 40-50% 50-60% 70-80% 80-90% 90-100% O'Malley: 30-40% Tie No Vote

The 2016 Texas Democratic presidential primary took place on March 1 in the U.S. state of Texas as one of the Democratic Party's primaries ahead of the 2016 presidential election.

On the same day, dubbed "Super Tuesday," Democratic primaries were held in ten other states plus American Samoa, while the Republican Party held primaries in eleven states, including their own Texas primary.

Decisive support from Latinos—particularly in the rural Rio Grande Valley—delivered a landslide win to Clinton.

== Opinion polling ==
Poll source	Date	1st	2nd	3rd	Other
Primary results	March 1, 2016	Hillary Clinton; 65.2%	Bernie Sanders; 33.2%		Others; 1.6%
Emerson Margin of error: ± 5.9% Sample size: 275	February 26–28, 2016	Hillary Clinton; 68%	Bernie Sanders; 26%		Others / Undecided; 6%
American Research Group Margin of error: ± 5.0% Sample size: 400	February 26–28, 2016	Hillary Clinton; 58%	Bernie Sanders; 38%		Others / Undecided; 4%
YouGov/CBS News Margin of error: ± 6.9% Sample size: 750	February 22–26, 2016	Hillary Clinton; 61%	Bernie Sanders; 37%		Others / Undecided; 2%
Monmouth Margin of error: ± 5.6; Sample size: 304	February 22–24, 2016	Hillary Clinton; 64%	Bernie Sanders; 30%		Others / Undecided; 6%
Emerson College Margin of error: ± 5.4; Sample size: 328	February 21–23, 2016	Hillary Clinton; 56%	Bernie Sanders; 40%		Others / Undecided; 4%
NBC News/Wall St. Jrnl Margin of error: ± 4.9; Sample size: 405	February 18–23, 2016	Hillary Clinton; 59%	Bernie Sanders; 38%		Others / Undecided; 3%
KTVT-CBS 11 Margin of error: ± 3.8; Sample size: 675	February 22, 2016	Hillary Clinton; 61%	Bernie Sanders; 29%		Others / Undecided; 10%
TEGNA/SurveyUSA Margin of error: ± 4.1; Sample size: 569	February 21–22, 2016	Hillary Clinton; 61%	Bernie Sanders; 32%		Others / Undecided; 7%
Austin American-Statesman Margin of error: ± 5.0; Sample size: 411	February 19–22, 2016	Hillary Clinton; 66%	Bernie Sanders; 26%		Others / Undecided; 8%
UT/TT Margin of error: ±4.57; Sample Size: ? Dem Voters	February 12–19, 2016	Hillary Clinton; 57%	Bernie Sanders; 40%	Rocky de la Fuente; 2%	Martin O'Malley 1% Willie Wilson 1%
Public Policy Polling Margin of error: ± 4.3; Sample size: 514	February 14–16, 2016	Hillary Clinton; 57%	Bernie Sanders; 34%		

Polls in 2015

Poll source	Date	1st	2nd	3rd	Other
University of Texas/Texas Tribune Margin of error ± 4.57% Sample Size: 459	October 30 – November 8, 2015	Hillary Clinton; 61%	Bernie Sanders; 30%	Martin O'Malley 1%	Lawrence Lessig 0% No Opinion 7%
CBS-DFW Margin of error: ± 3.09% Sample size: 1008	October 23–24, 2015	Hillary Clinton; 59%	Bernie Sanders; 10%	Martin O'Malley; 3%	Undecided 28%
Texas Lyceum Margin of error: ± 7.15% Sample size: 185	September 8–21, 2015	Hillary Clinton; 36%	Bernie Sanders; 24%	Joe Biden; 15%	Jim Webb 1%, Martin O'Malley 0%, Lincoln Chafee 0% Undecided 23%
UoT/Texas Tribune Margin of error: ± 4.58% Sample size: 457	June 5–14, 2015	Hillary Clinton; 53%	Bernie Sanders; 15%	Joe Biden; 8%	Elizabeth Warren 8%, Andrew Cuomo 1%, Martin O'Malley 1%, Jim Webb 1%, Lincoln Chafee 1% Undecided 12%
UoT/Texas Tribune Margin of error: ± 4.89% Sample size: 401	February 6–15, 2015	Hillary Clinton; 62%	Elizabeth Warren; 12%	Joe Biden; 6%	Bernie Sanders 5%, Martin O'Malley 1%, Jim Webb 1%, Undecided 14%

Polls in 2014

Poll source	Date	1st	2nd	3rd	Other
UoT/Texas Tribune Margin of error: ± 4.73% Sample size: 429	October 10–19, 2014	Hillary Clinton; 60%	Elizabeth Warren; 13%	Joe Biden; 10%	Andrew Cuomo 2%, Brian Schweitzer 1%, Jim Webb 1%, Martin O'Malley 0%, Undecided 13%
UoT/Texas Tribune Margin of error: ± 4.75% Sample size: 426	May 30 – June 8, 2014	Hillary Clinton; 64%	Elizabeth Warren; 15%	Joe Biden; 8%	Andrew Cuomo 2%, Brian Schweitzer 1%, Martin O'Malley 0%, Undecided 10%

Polls in 2013

Poll source	Date	1st	2nd	3rd	Other
UoT/Texas Tribune Margin of error: ± 4.82% Sample size: 414	October 18–29, 2013	Hillary Clinton; 67%	Joe Biden; 7%	Elizabeth Warren; 5%	Andrew Cuomo 1%, Martin O'Malley 1%, Brian Schweitzer 1%, Mark Warner 1%, Kirsten Gillibrand 0%, Don't Know 17%
UoT/Texas Tribune Margin of error: ± 5.89% Sample size: 376	May 31 – June 9, 2013	Hillary Clinton; 66%	Joe Biden; 11%	Andrew Cuomo; 1%	Kirsten Gillibrand 1%, Mark Warner 1%, Martin O'Malley 0%, Brian Schweitzer 0%, Don't Know 19%

== Results ==
Primary date: March 1, 2016
National delegates: 75

Texas Democratic primary, March 1, 2016
Candidate	Popular vote		Estimated delegates		
Candidate	Count	Percentage	Pledged	Unpledged	Total
Hillary Clinton	936,004	65.19%	147	21	168
Bernie Sanders	476,547	33.19%	75	0	75
Rocky De La Fuente	8,429	0.59%			
Martin O'Malley (withdrawn)	5,364	0.37%			
Willie Wilson	3,254	0.23%			
Keith Judd	2,569	0.18%			
Calvis L. Hawes	2,017	0.14%			
Star Locke	1,711	0.12%			
Uncommitted	—N/a		0	8	8
Total	1,435,895	100%	222	29	251

=== Results by county ===
County	Clinton	%	Sanders	%
Anderson	996	75.6%	299	22.7%
Andrews	76	66.1%	38	33.0%
Angelina	1,950	73.7%	622	23.5%
Aransas	488	63.1%	272	35.1%
Archer	99	58.9%	64	38.1%
Armstrong	1	20.0%	4	80.0%
Atascosa	1,355	71.7%	478	25.3%
Austin	492	73.4%	165	24.6%
Bailey	84	71.2%	29	24.6%
Bandera	378	55.4%	294	43.1%
Bastrop	2,896	59.0%	1,950	39.8%
Bland	46	61.3%	24	32.0%
Bee	1,133	75.1%	320	21.2%
Bell	7,430	69.9%	3,090	29.1%
Bexar	76,533	66.8%	36,750	32.1%
Blanco	284	54.9%	232	44.9%
Borden	4	80.0%	1	20.0%
Bosque	353	62.6%	199	35.3%
Bowie	2,437	76.7%	687	21.6%
Brazoria	8,009	69.6%	3,721	28.6%
Brazos	3,561	49.1%	3,589	49.5%
Brewster	701	43.7%	771	48.1%
Briscoe	16	57.1%	11	32.3%
Brooks	1,603	74.4%	362	16.8%
Brown	319	58.5%	212	38.9%
Burleson	469	74.0%	149	23.5%
Burnet	878	59.4%	580	39.3%
Caldwell	1,543	66.1%	742	31.8%
Calhoun	709	66.6%	305	28.6%
Callahan	87	44.2%	104	52.8%
Cameron	20,332	68.2%	8,320	27.9%
Camp	484	76.6%	134	21.2%
Carson	50	62.5%	30	37.5%
Cass	778	73.1%	265	24.9%
Castro	127	73.9%	40	23.3%
Chambers	688	67.9%	295	29.1%
Cherokee	990	74.2%	324	24.3%
Childress	54	58.7%	34	37.0%
Clay	120	62.5%	65	33.9%
Cochran	4	50.0%	3	37.5%
Coke	25	48.1%	25	48.1%
Coleman	75	60.0%	49	39.2%
Collin	23,670	59.1%	16,171	40.4%
Collingsworth	36	59.0%	24	39.3%
Colorado	474	74.8%	150	23.7%
Comal	3,112	60.0%	2,027	39.1%
Comanche	221	63.5%	117	33.6%
Concho	27	69.2%	11	28.2%
Cooke	449	56.4%	334	42.0%
Coryell	1,010	62.7%	577	35.8%
Cottle	27	57.5%	18	38.3%
Crane	62	66.0%	24	25.5%
Crockett	266	37.7%	240	34.0%
Crosby	131	58.2%	91	40.4%
Culberson	358	62.2%	160	27.8%
Dallam	24	61.5%	13	33.3%
Dallas	113,664	71.5%	44,275	27.8%
Dawson	92	70.2%	34	26.0%
Deaf Smith	200	67.8%	86	29.2%
Delta	110	67.9%	51	31.5%
Denton	16,491	50.7%	15,781	48.6%
Dewitt	293	70.3%	113	27.1%
Dickens	13	52.0%	11	44.0%
Dimmit	1,804	68.9%	534	20.4%
Donley	35	47.8%	35	50.7%
Duval	2,273	76.2%	523	17.5%
Eastland	171	55.7%	122	39.7%
Ector	1,855	64.9%	942	33.0%
Edwards	42	57.5%	27	37.0%
Ellis	3,725	69.5%	1,568	29.2%
El Paso	36,140	66.0%	17,234	31.5%
Erath	427	52.5%	365	44.9%
Falls	551	91.4%	115	17.0%
Fannin	507	63.0%	279	34.7%
Fayette	584	63.9%	309	33.8%
Fisher	226	53.3%	146	34.4%
Floyd	60	65.9%	24	26.4%
Foard	80	34.3%	112	48.1%
Fort Bend	29,259	74.6%	9,774	24.9%
Franklin	164	67.8%	73	30.2%
Freestone	380	76.8%	102	20.6%
Frio	1,864	67.7%	630	22.9%
Gaines	91	55.8%	59	36.2%
Galveston	9,466	68.2%	4,241	30.6%
Garza	35	56.5%	22	35.5%
Gillespie	493	60.9%	314	38.8%
Glasscock	4	50.0%	4	50.0%
Goliad	389	66.4%	151	25.8%
Gonzales	368	72.3%	129	25.3%
Gray	111	53.9%	86	41.8%
Grayson	1,940	52.8%	1,687	45.9%
Gregg	3,423	78.0%	911	20.8%
Grimes	584	73.2%	201	25.2%
Guadalupe	3,793	63.9%	2,067	34.8%
Hale	312	60.4%	176	34.0%
Hall	63	64.3%	28	28.6%
Hamilton	115	56.5%	84	40.2%
Hansford	21	58.3%	13	36.1%
Hardeman	71	39.4%	88	48.9%
Hardin	625	59.5%	398	27.9%
Harris	157,000	70.5%	63,416	28.5%
Harrison	2,046	76.9%	530	19.9%
Hartley	19	55.8%	19	36.5%
Haskell	159	58.7%	92	34.3%
Hays	6,634	46.9%	7,322	51.8%
Hemphill	15	65.2%	8	34.8%
Henderson	1,593	71.6%	598	26.9%
Hidalgo	40,308	69.1%	15,907	27.3%
Hill	718	69.1%	297	28.6%
Hockley	183	58.3%	116	36.9%
Hood	928	62.6%	527	35.6%
Houston	464	80.0%	101	17.4%
Howard	351	63.5%	192	34.7%
Hudspeth	99	39.9%	97	39.1%
Hunt	1,329	60.5%	849	38.6%
Hutchinson	153	55.8%	103	37.6%
Irion	28	65.1%	14	32.6%
Jack	87	62.1%	46	32.9%
Jackson	266	70.6%	94	24.9%
Jasper	932	75.7%	270	21.9%
Jeff Davis	140	49.5%	132	46.6%
Jefferson	16,589	76.9%	4,441	20.6%
Jim Hogg	1,421	75.0%	356	18.8%
Jim Wells	4,697	71.7%	1,436	21.9%
Johnson	2,271	58.5%	1,566	40.4%
Jones	173	63.1%	95	34.7%
Karnes	726	53.0%	479	34.9%
Kaufman	2,234	69.6%	951	29.6%
Kendall	641	56.2%	491	43.0%
Kenedy	63	59.4%	32	30.2%
Kent	22	36.7%	28	46.7%
Kerr	1,020	58.4%	709	40.6%
Kimble	29	44.6%	34	52.3%
King	2	66.7%	1	33.3%
Kinney	211	60.8%	107	30.8%
Kleberg	1,740	70.7%	630	25.6%
Knox	68	71.6%	17	17.9%
Lamar	924	69.3%	388	29.1%
Lamb	172	53.3%	87	26.9%
Lampasas	324	59.8%	207	38.2%
Lavaca	322	68.5%	137	29.2%
Lee	367	65.4%	180	32.1%
Leon	289	74.3%	89	22.9%
Liberty	1,043	71.3%	383	26.2%
Limestone	592	79.1%	144	19.3%
Lipscomb	22	64.7%	11	32.4%
Live Oak	203	67.4%	73	24.3%
Llano	519	64.8%	267	33.3%
Loving	3	25.0%	5	41.7%
Lubbock	5,782	57.3%	4,137	41.0%
Lynn	14	58.3%	10	41.7%
Madison	227	75.2%	70	23.2%
Martin	36	59.0%	17	27.9%
Mason	89	62.7%	50	35.2%
Matagorda	1,088	74.2%	344	23.5%
Maverick	4,343	69.5%	1,508	24.2%
McCulloch	93	66.0%	43	30.5%
McLennan	5,531	67.0%	2,633	31.9%
McMullen	4	80.0%	1	20.0%
Medina	1,073	69.7%	436	28.3%
Menard	23	56.1%	16	39.0%
Midland	1,556	63.1%	854	34.6%
Milam	577	67.8%	252	29.6%
Mills	50	53.2%	41	43.6%
Mitchell	109	73.2%	33	22.2%
Montague	153	54.3%	122	43.3%
Montgomery	7,540	59.5%	5,040	39.8%
Moore	149	59.9%	81	32.5%
Morris	488	71.4%	169	24.7%
Motley	13	68.4%	6	31.6%
Nacogdoches	1,600	65.2%	829	33.8%
Navarro	957	72.5%	334	25.3%
Newton	605	44.2%	529	40.4%
Nolan	270	65.5%	122	29.6%
Nueces	15,671	70.5%	6,175	27.8%
Ochiltree	36	53.7%	29	43.3%
Oldham	11	68.8%	4	25.0%
Orange	1,852	68.1%	816	30.0%
Palo Pinto	361	59.5%	230	37.9%
Panola	559	80.1%	130	18.6%
Parker	1,808	54.6%	1,475	44.5%
Parmer	82	72.6%	26	23.0%
Pecos	816	55.4%	488	33.2%
Polk	860	71.1%	326	26.9%
Potter	1,490	56.5%	1,094	41.5%
Presidio	776	57.4%	447	33.1%
Rains	173	64.3%	89	33.1%
Randall	1,591	51.0%	1,489	47.7%
Reagan	12	63.2%	7	36.8%
Real	28	53.9%	23	44.2%
Red River	378	70.1%	87	18.2%
Reeves	1,128	59.6%	563	29.7%
Refugio	549	64.1%	254	29.7%
Roberts	3	60.0%	2	40.0%
Robertson	896	70.9%	289	22.9%
Rockwall	1,726	59.5%	1,046	36.1%
Runnels	80	57.6%	55	39.6%
Rusk	1,114	78.1%	276	19.4%
Sabine	192	66.4%	82	28.4%
San Augustine	368	83.1%	62	14.0%
San Jacinto	562	72.1%	193	24.7%
San Patricio	2,638	73.2%	850	23.6%
San Saba	58	67.4%	27	31.4%
Schleicer	58	64.4%	24	26.7%
Scurry	154	61.6%	85	34.0%
Shackelford	15	50.0%	14	46.7%
Shelby	346	77.8%	90	20.2%
Sherman	19	61.3%	8	25.8%
Smith	5,778	73.5%	2,003	25.5%
Somervell	66	49.3%	67	50.0%
Starr	6,936	77.8%	1,635	18.3%
Stephens	45	55.6%	35	43.2%
Sterling	5	50.0%	4	40.0%
Stonewall	59	57.8%	36	35.3%
Sutton	27	69.2%	10	25.6%
Swisher	141	60.5%	78	33.5%
Tarrant	68,044	65.2%	35,733	34.2%
Taylor	1,794	54.6%	1,427	43.4%
Terrell	67	43.5%	64	41.6%
Terry	141	59.0%	83	34.7%
Throckmorton	26	61.9%	16	38.1%
Titus	552	71.3%	197	25.5%
Tom Green	1,657	55.9%	1,239	41.8%
Travis	69,446	48.2%	74,068	51.4%
Trinity	333	71.8%	117	25.2%
Tyler	453	74.3%	372	22.8%
Upshur	725	71.7%	269	26.6%
Upton	91	55.8%	45	27.6%
Uvalde	1,744	63.4%	762	27.7%
Val Verde	1,776	65.8%	765	28.3%
Van Zandt	722	64.1%	377	33.5%
Victoria	2,206	64.5%	1,119	32.7%
Walker	1,292	61.3%	789	37.4%
Waller	1,221	67.4%	559	30.9%
Ward	306	62.2%	147	29.9%
Washington	782	73.0%	278	25.9%
Webb	18,559	71.9%	6,177	23.9%
Wharton	961	76.5%	224	18.3%
Wheeler	37	59.7%	23	37.1%
Wichita	1,958	55.5%	1,524	43.2%
Wilbarger	136	61.5%	75	33.9%
Willacy	2,081	70.0%	660	22.2%
Williamson	16,396	52.7%	14,554	46.7%
Wilson	1,282	71.5%	481	26.8%
Winkler	30	69.8%	11	25.6%
Wise	751	56.2%	558	41.8%
Wood	663	68.7%	285	29.5%
Yoakum	9	42.9%	10	47.6%
Young	201	58.8%	132	38.6%
Zapata	1,973	67.9%	685	23.6%
Zavala	1,557	75.5%	373	18.1%
Total	936,004	65.2%	476,547	33.2%

== Analysis ==
Clinton won the Texas primary by a landslide margin of over thirty points, thanks in large part to support from Hispanic/Latinos (whom she won by a margin of 71–29 over Bernie Sanders), African American voters (whom she won 83–15) and white women (63-35 over Sanders). Clinton won all of the major cities (Fort Worth, Dallas, El Paso, San Antonio, and Houston, and Corpus Christi) except for Austin where Sanders won only narrowly.

Sanders won few counties outside of Travis County, where the University of Texas at Austin is located. He won neighboring Hays County, home to another prominent college, Texas State University in San Marcos. Sanders also managed to very narrowly edge out Clinton in Brazos County, home to College Station and Texas A&M University, by 28 votes. In all three counties mentioned above, Sanders performed worse than Barack Obama did in the 2008 Texas Democratic primary and caucuses, despite all three containing a bloc of young voters, a demographic Sanders usually performs well in.

The rest of Sanders's victories came from 11 sparsely populated counties where Republicans have performed strongly in the past several elections. His strongest performance came from the Texas Panhandle in Armstrong County, where he won 80% of the vote, 4 votes to Clinton's 1. Two counties in particular, Glasscock and Coke, had Sanders and Clinton tie.
