= Bill Richardson 2008 presidential campaign =

American political campaign

Bill Richardson for President
- Campaign: U.S. presidential election, 2008
- Candidate: Bill Richardson; Governor of New Mexico (2003–2011)
- Affiliation: Democratic Party
- EC formed: January 21, 2007
- Announced: May 21, 2007
- Suspended: January 10, 2008
- Headquarters: Santa Fe, New Mexico
- Key people: Dave Contarino (Manager); Amanda Cooper (Deputy Manager); Paul Shipley (Comm. Director); Steve Murphy (Senior Advisor)
- Receipts: US$23.6 (2007-12-31)
- Slogan(s): Real Experience, Real Accomplishments

Website
- richardsonforpresident.com (archived - September 30, 2007)

The 2008 presidential campaign of Bill Richardson, New Mexico Governor Bill Richardson announced his candidacy on January 21, 2007, for President of the United States on ABC's This Week with George Stephanopoulos, by virtue of forming a presidential exploratory committee.

Richardson became the first Democrat of Hispanic descent to mount a nationwide campaign for president. Although Richardson claimed to be the first Hispanic to run for president, Ben Fernandez had sought the Republican nomination in 1980, and also ran mostly symbolic campaigns in 1984 and 1988. When challenged on the claim to be the first, a Richardson spokesman stated that Richardson was the first "serious" Hispanic candidate, however Fernandez earned 3 delegates to the Republican National Convention in 1980, whereas Richardson earned no delegates in his run.

He withdrew from the race on January 10, 2008, after only placing fourth in the Iowa and New Hampshire primaries, the first two of the season.

== Leading up to announcement ==
In 2006, the Associated Press reported that Richardson informed party leaders that he intended to run in the 2008 U.S. presidential election. In early December 2006 Fox News claimed that Richardson told DNC leaders he would run for president, but Richardson said he would wait to decide in January 2007.

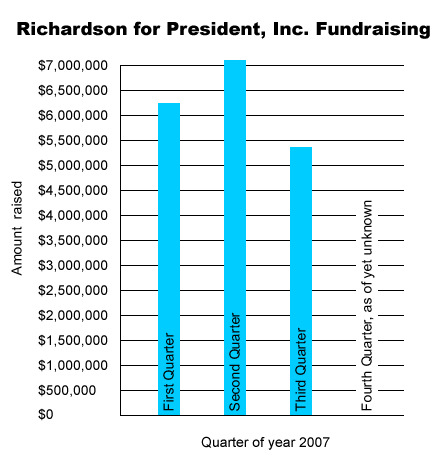
Bill Richardson's fundraising efforts for the first three quarters of 2007.

== Announcement ==
On January 21, 2007, Richardson told George Stephanopoulos on ABC's This Week that he was launching a Presidential Exploratory Committee, his first official step of seeking the 2008 Democratic party nomination.

Although already campaigning for months before, Governor Richardson formally announced his candidacy on May 21, 2007, in Los Angeles, saying, "The United States faces huge challenges, but also huge opportunities. I am running for president because these times call for a leader with a proven track record, and a demonstrated ability to bring people together to tackle our problems at home and abroad, I am that person, not because I say so, but because of what I have done, and what I can do for the American people."

== Campaign developments ==
=== First half 2007 ===
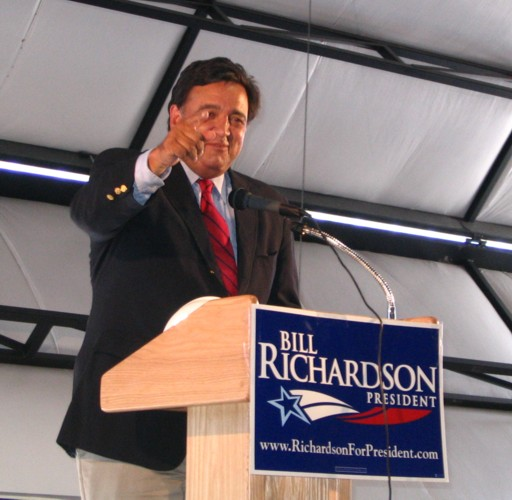
Richardson campaigning in Elko, Nevada, July 2007

On March 4, 2007, while attending a campaign breakfast event in Des Moines, Iowa, Richardson said he believed that the Democratic contest will be decided very early — by the end of January 2008 after the first four state contests (Iowa, Nevada, New Hampshire, and South Carolina). "I believe the first four states, with Iowa and New Hampshire being the top ones, will determine who the president is. I always felt that way. What the pundits say about who's in, who's out, who's got the most money doesn't matter. I have a sustained plan to introduce myself to the voters ... and so far I feel very satisfied. I feel I can do very well."

The Bill Richardson for President Exploratory Committee raised $6.3 million in the first quarter of 2007. As of April 1, 2007, the campaign had $5 million cash on hand. This was the fifth highest amount raised among the eight candidates for the 2008 Democratic nomination.

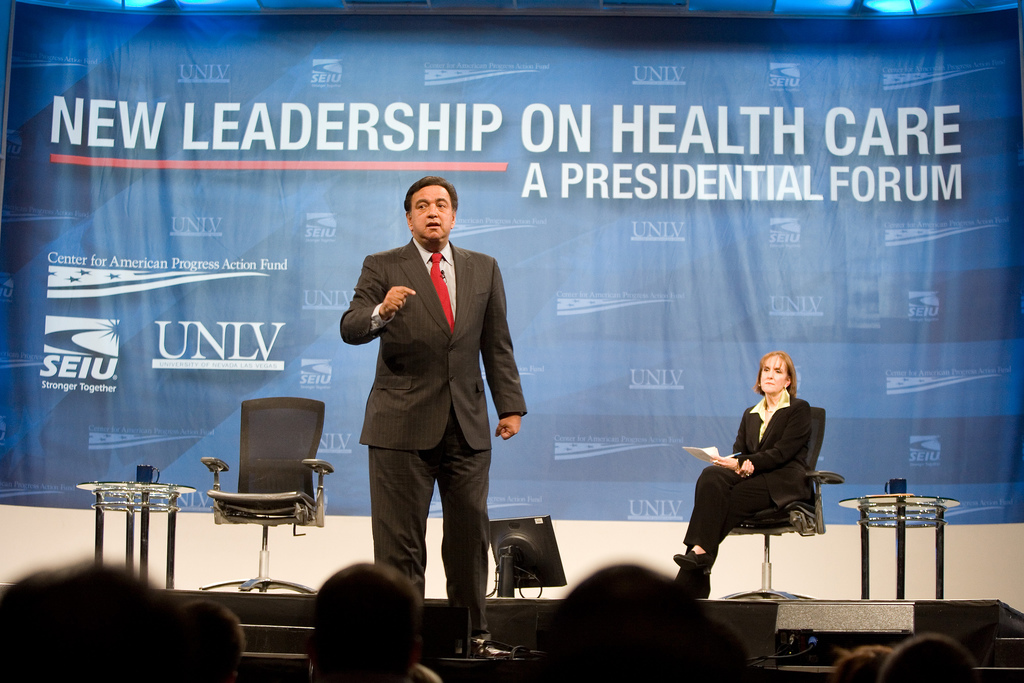
Bill Richardson at the University of Nevada, Las Vegas Presidential Health Care Forum, March 2007.

As part of a diplomatic mission, Richardson traveled to North Korea in early April 2007 for meetings with government officials and successfully recovered the remains of six U.S. servicemen in that country. Richardson had said after the tour that it was "a lot of propaganda, but we're guests here."

With the early departure of Governor Tom Vilsack of Iowa, Richardson became the only candidate in the race for the Democratic nomination with executive experience, a characteristic that he believed would attract Iowa voters. After beginning the race with one percent in most national polls, he began rising to some degree, reaching five percent in three polls conducted in late February 2007, and in so doing, separating himself from other 'second tier' candidates. He was named the "candidate most likely to become a serious contender." Similarly, he began to rise in polls of the early primary and caucus states; a Nevada poll had Richardson with 6%. He also rose to ten percent in New Hampshire, only five points behind John Edwards.

=== Second half 2007 ===
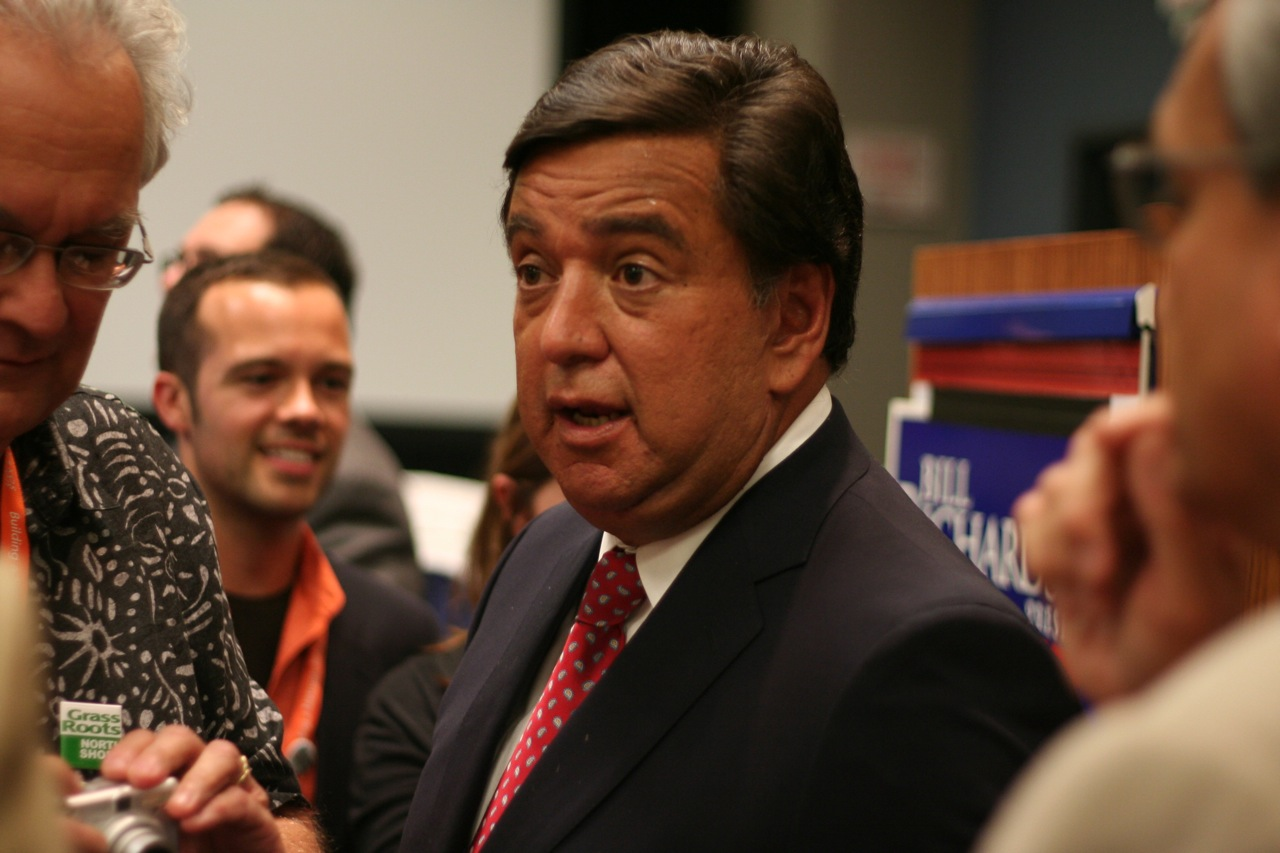
Richardson at the 2007 YearlyKos convention at McCormick Place in Chicago

By August 12, 2007, Richardson had $7 million of campaign funds on hand, placing him with the fourth highest amount.

By November 2007, Richardson was still struggling to escape the second tier of Democratic candidates, although upticks in his poll numbers in first-voting Iowa and New Hampshire led to speculation that he might be able to overtake stalled third-place runner John Edwards, especially in the latter state.

=== Withdrawal ===
On Wednesday, January 9, 2008, it was reported that Richardson would announce his withdrawal from the 2008 presidential race on Thursday. He officially announced his withdrawal on January 10 at 3:00 PM Eastern Time.

=== Endorsement ===
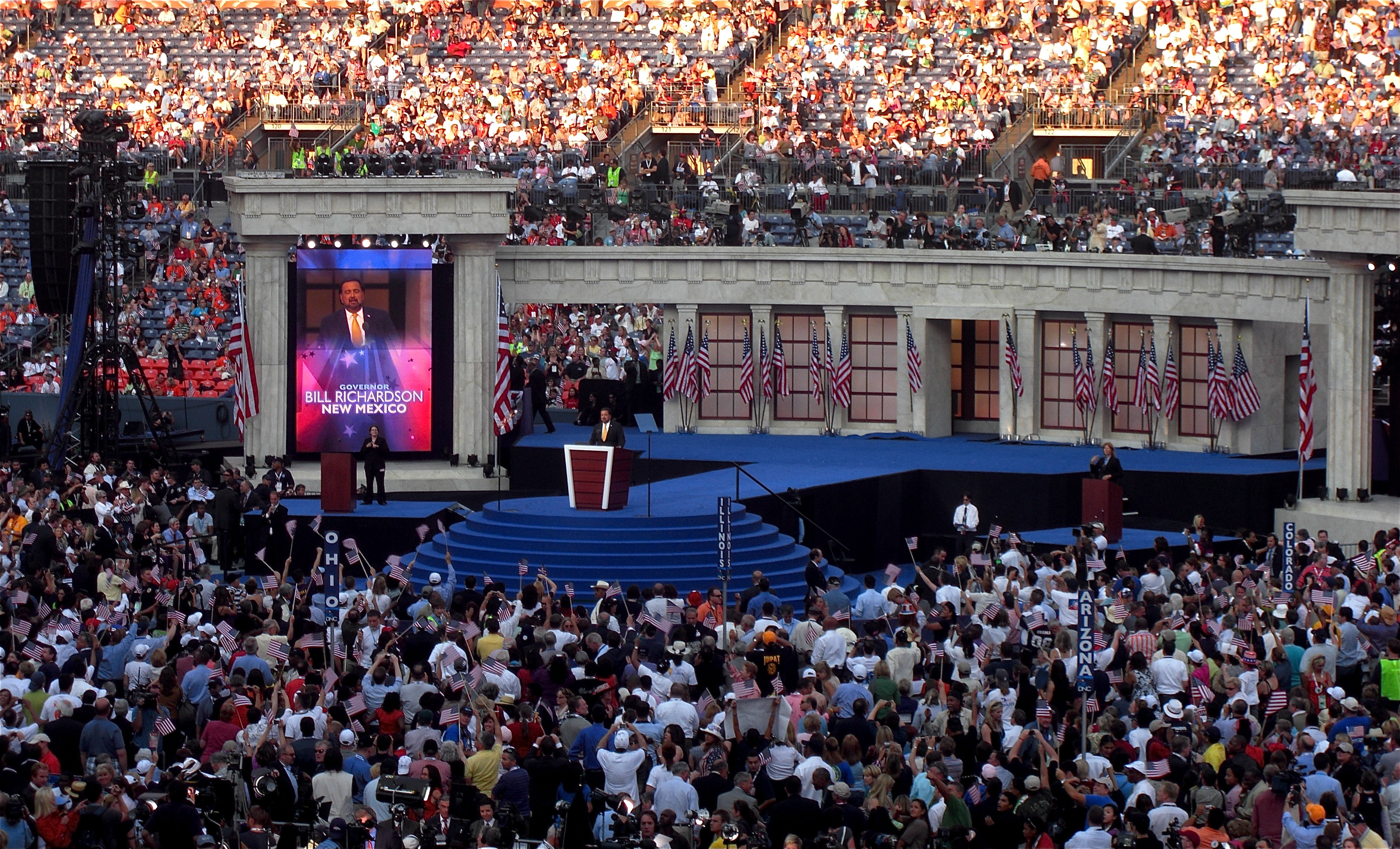
Richardson speaks during the final day of the 2008 Democratic National Convention in Denver, Colorado.

On March 21, 2008, the Associated Press reported that Richardson would endorse Barack Obama for president. Richardson endorsed Obama, calling him "a once in a lifetime leader". Commentator and Clinton ally James Carville famously compared Richardson to Judas Iscariot for the move. Richardson responded in a Washington Post article, feeling "compelled to defend [himself] against character assassination and baseless allegations."

=== Debt and campaign refunds ===
It was reported on March 25, 2008, that Governor Bill Richardson's presidential campaign refunded nearly $789,000. However, his campaign's bank account showed a balance of only $40,939. With a debt of $420,848, Richardson was required to refund company executives, state lobbyists, and other various campaign donors with new, freshly raised funds. There is no report on what the donated money was spent on.

== Primaries and caucuses ==
Throughout the primaries and caucuses, Richardson lagged behind fellow Democrats in polling data. Despite campaigning heavily in early states such as Iowa, New Hampshire, and Nevada, Richardson continued to barely register in polls. Richardson competed only in the Iowa caucuses and New Hampshire primary due to his withdrawal prior to caucuses in Nevada.

=== Iowa caucuses ===
When Richardson first began his campaign, his Iowa poll numbers shot up considerably. By early September, Richardson was polling between 10%-12%. Despite polling lower than Clinton, Edwards, or Obama, Richardson's polling in September far exceeded the fellow insurgent candidacies of Chris Dodd, Dennis Kucinich, and Joe Biden. However, Richardson's support fell throughout November and December, and by late December, Richardson was fighting with Biden for 4th place in Iowa (both polled between 4 and 7% in December.)

Ultimately, however, Richardson's support, like the support of most other candidacies other than Clinton, Obama, and Edwards, collapsed in Iowa. On Caucus Night, Richardson beat Biden for fourth, but finished with 5,278 state delegates, or 2% of the vote, and received no delegates to the DNC.

=== New Hampshire primary ===
Much like Iowa, Richardson started off the New Hampshire campaign with promise. By late December Richardson was polling with 11%, fighting with John Edwards who was polling around 14%-15% in late Dec. However, similar to his Iowa campaign, Richardson's New Hampshire campaign collapsed on primary night. When all of the votes were counted, Richardson placed fourth with 13,269 votes or 5% of the vote compared with Clinton's 39%, Obama's 37%, and Edwards's 17%.

== Endorsements ==
List of individuals endorsing Bill Richardson for president in 2008

Richardson's endorsers include:

- United States Senator Jeff Bingaman of New Mexico
- United States Congressman Mike Doyle of Pennsylvania
- United States Congressman Gene Green of Texas
- United States Congressman Solomon Ortiz of Texas
- United States Congressman Ed Pastor of Arizona
- United States Congressman Silvestre Reyes of Texas
- United States Congressman Tom Udall of New Mexico
- New Hampshire State Representative, Jane E. Beaulieu (D)
- New Hampshire State Representative Susan R Kepner (D)
- New Hampshire State Representative Joel F Winters (D)
- New Hampshire State Representative Daniel W McKenna (D)
- New Hampshire State Representative Lily Mesa (D)
- New Hampshire State Representative Mary Ann Knowles (D)
- New Hampshire State Representative Eileen S Ehlers (D)
- New Hampshire State Representative Armand D Forest (D)
- New Hampshire State Representative Dana S Hilliard (D)
- New Hampshire State Representative Candace C W Bouchard (D)
- New Hampshire State Representative Stephen P. Spratt (D)
- New Hampshire State Representative Scott Merrick (D)
- New Hampshire State Representative Tara G Reardon (D)
- New Hampshire State Representative John K Knowles (D)
