= Fundraising for the 2008 United States presidential election =

In the 2008 United States presidential election, fundraising increased significantly compared to the levels achieved in previous presidential elections.

According to required campaign filings as reported by the Federal Election Commission (FEC), 148 candidates for all parties collectively raised $1,644,712,232 and spent $1,601,104,696 for the primary and general campaigns combined through November 24, 2008. The amounts raised and spent by the major candidates, according to the same source, were as follows:

Candidate (party)	Amount raised	Amount spent	Votes	Average spent per vote
Barack Obama (D)	$778,642,962	$760,370,195	69,498,215	$10.94
John McCain (R)	$383,913,834	$358,008,447	59,948,240	$5.97
Ralph Nader (I)	$4,496,180	$4,187,628	738,720	$5.67
Bob Barr (L)	$1,383,681	$1,345,202	523,713	$2.57
Chuck Baldwin (C)	$261,671	$234,309	199,437	$1.10
Cynthia McKinney (G)	$240,130	$238,968	161,680	$1.48
Excludes spending by independent expenditure concerns. Source: Federal Election Commission

Democratic Party candidate Barack Obama created a broad grassroots movement and a new method of campaigning by courting and mobilizing activists, donations, and voters through the Internet (see grassroots fundraising). It was part of a campaign that mobilized grassroots workers in every state. Obama also set fundraising records in more than one month by gaining support from a record-breaking number of individual small donors.

The reported cost of campaigning for president has increased significantly in recent years. One source reported that if the costs for both Democratic and Republican campaigns were added together (for the presidential primary election, general election, and the political conventions), the costs have more than doubled in only eight years ($448.9 million in 1996, $649.5 million in 2000, and $1.01 billion in 2004). In January 2007, Federal Election Commission Chairman Michael E. Toner estimated that the 2008 race would be a $1 billion election, and that to be taken seriously, a candidate would have needed to raise at least $100 million by the end of 2007.

Although he had said he would not be running for president, published reports in 2007 indicated that billionaire and New York City mayor Michael Bloomberg had been considering a presidential bid as an independent with up to $1 billion of his own fortune to finance it. Bloomberg ultimately ended this speculation by unequivocally stating that he would not run. Had Bloomberg decided to run, he would not have needed to campaign in the primary elections or participate in the conventions, reducing both the necessary length and cost of his campaign.

With the increase in money expenditures, many candidates did not use the public financing system funded by the presidential election campaign fund checkoff. John McCain, Tom Tancredo, John Edwards, Chris Dodd, and Joe Biden qualified for and elected to take public funds throughout the primary process. Major Democratic candidates Hillary Clinton and Barack Obama chose not to participate in the public financing system.

Howard Dean collected large contributions through the Internet in his 2004 primary run. In 2008, candidates went even further to reach out to Internet users through their own sites and such sites as YouTube, MySpace, and Facebook.

On December 16, 2007, Ron Paul collected $6 million, more money on a single day through Internet donations than any presidential candidate to date, though this was exceeded with a $10 million day in September 2008 by Barack Obama.

Fundraising plays a central role in many presidential campaigns and is a key factor in determining the viability of candidates. Money raised is applied in many ways, such as for the salaries of non-volunteers in the campaign, transportation, campaign materials, and media advertisements. Under United States law, candidates are required to file campaign finance details with the Federal Election Commission (FEC) at the end of every calendar quarter. Summaries of these reports are made available to the public shortly thereafter, revealing the relative financial situations of all the campaigns.

== Election cycle summary ==
On February 22, 2008, the New York Times reported for the period through January 31, 2008, with Hillary Clinton's campaign spending $106 million, Barack Obama's campaign spending $115 million and John McCain's committee $41 million." In general, the current Federal Election Commission election cycle-to-date statistics may be viewed online, in summary and tabular form.

=== Through December 31, 2007 ===
Quarterly FEC reports summarize the total contributions (from individuals, political party committees, other political committees, and the candidate), loans, receipts (incoming money), and disbursements (outgoing money) for the election cycle. The tables immediately below include finance totals from the start of the election cycle up to December 31, 2007. All values in US dollars. Candidates sorted by total campaign contributions. Another key factor in the Presidential Campaign finance is the so called "Individual Financing"

=== Democrats ===
Candidate	Contributions	Loans received	All receipts	Operating expenditures	All disbursements
Hillary Clinton ‡	107,056,586	0	118,301,659	77,804,197	106,000,000
Barack Obama	102,092,819	0	103,802,537	84,497,445	85,176,289
John Edwards ‡	34,986,088	8,974,714	44,259,386	33,513,005	36,468,929
Bill Richardson †	22,421,742	1,000,000	23,671,031	21,401,414	21,857,565
Chris Dodd †	10,414,392	1,302,811	16,547,015	14,040,555	14,057,455
Joe Biden †	8,245,241	1,132,114	11,405,771	9,518,537	9,538,687
Dennis Kucinich †	3,869,613	0	3,870,840	3,638,219	3,641,234
Combined total	289,086,481	12,409,639	321,858,239	244,413,372	251,093,944

† This candidate has withdrawn their presidential bid.

‡ This candidate has suspended their presidential bid.

=== Republicans ===
Candidate	Contributions	Loans received	All receipts	Operating expenditures	All disbursements
Rudy Giuliani †	58,789,214	0	61,645,421	48,197,458	48,868,609
Mitt Romney ‡	53,915,464	35,350,000	90,076,402	86,670,597	87,644,955
John McCain	37,480,640	2,971,697	42,094,078	30,721,676	39,145,650
Ron Paul †	28,146,661	0	28,219,301	20,262,288	20,380,121
Fred Thompson †	21,740,757	0	21,812,645	19,495,821	19,672,378
Mike Huckabee†	8,990,477	0	9,003,810	7,090,971	7,107,365
Sam Brownback †	3,653,570	0	4,374,058	4,295,606	4,368,746
Duncan Hunter †	2,321,563	130,000	2,496,085	2,275,986	2,299,490
Tommy Thompson †	1,024,992	196,000	1,226,129	1,213,274	1,223,567
Jim Gilmore †	357,986	34,804	404,881	384,026	388,426
Tom Tancredo †					
Combined total	216,421,324	38,682,501	261,352,810	220,607,703	231,099,307

† This candidate has withdrawn their presidential bid.

‡ This candidate has suspended their presidential bid.

== 4th quarter 2007 ==
This is a summary of campaign finance for the fourth quarter of 2007, spanning from October 1, 2007, to December 31, 2007. All data has been extracted from reports provided by the Federal Election Commission.

By default, the tables below sort the candidates by Receipts without loans for the 4th quarter of 2007. These values are largely composed of campaign contributions, but also include offsets to expenditures (refunds, rebates, etc.) and other receipts (dividents, interest, etc.). To sort by another value, click the column's icon. All values in US Dollars.

=== Democrats ===
Candidate	Total receipts	Money raised primaries	Money raised general	Loans received	Receipts w/o loans	Money spent	Cash on hand	Total debt	Cash on hand minus debt
Hillary Clinton ‡	27,339,347	19,954,747	3,119,909	0	26,776,409	39,886,410	37,947,874	4,987,425	32,960,449
Barack Obama	23,526,004	15,117,691	920,081	0	22,847,568	40,896,076	18,626,248	792,681	17,833,567
John Edwards ‡	13,900,622			8,974,714	4,834,761	18,537,625	7,790,458	9,067,278	-1,276,820
Joe Biden †	3,190,122			1,132,114	2,055,971	3,209,364	1,867,392	2,073,418	-206,026
Bill Richardson †	4,971,095			1,000,000	3,898,226	8,979,217	1,813,466	374,164	1,439,302
Dennis Kucinich †	1,738,916			0	1,738,679	1,785,429	282,826	–	282,826

† This candidate has withdrawn his presidential bid.

‡ This candidate has suspended his/her presidential bid.

=== Republicans ===
Candidate	Total receipts	Loans received	Receipts w/o loans	Money spent	Cash on hand	Total debt	Cash on hand minus debt
Rudy Giuliani †	14,391,901	0	14,177,287	18,264,914	12,776,812	1,166,509	11,610,303
Ron Paul	19,951,290	0	19,951,290	17,556,672	7,839,421	0	7,839,421
Mitt Romney ‡	27,247,333	18,000,000	9,068,011	34,032,404	2,431,447	35,350,000	-32,918,553
Fred Thompson †	8,984,534	0	8,925,284	13,966,011	2,140,267	404,221	1,736,046
John McCain	9,969,292	2,971,697	6,836,072	10,509,492	2,948,428	4,516,030	-1,567,602
Mike Huckabee	6,651,957	0	6,642,586	5,406,812	1,896,446	97,676	1,798,770
Sam Brownback †	136,944	0	110,773	226,871	5,324	32,208	-26,884
Tommy Thompson †	63,722	28,500	32,756	61,740	2,562	197,912	-195,350

† This candidate has withdrawn his presidential bid.

‡ This candidate has suspended his presidential bid.

== 3rd quarter 2007 ==
Campaign Finance Information according to the Federal Election Commission for the end of the third calendar quarter 2007, ending September 30, 2007. The committees reporting may have amended their filings in the months following the initial reporting deadlines.

=== Democrats ===
Candidate	Money raised, 3Q	Money raised primaries	Money raised general	Loans received, 3Q	Money spent, 3Q	Total receipts	Cash on hand	Total debt	After debt
Hillary Clinton	$27,859,861	$18,903,993.69	$4,088,969.66	–	$22,623,680	$90,935,788	$50,463,013	$2,347,486	$48,115,527
Barack Obama	$21,343,291	$14,429,487	$1,156,525	–	$21,519,789	$80,256,426	$36,087,190	$1,409,739	$34,677,451
John Edwards	$7,157,232			–	$8,271,937	$30,329,151	$12,397,048	–	$12,397,048
Bill Richardson	$5,358,585			–	$6,666,681	$18,699,936	$5,821,587	$75,222	$5,746,365
Christopher Dodd	$1,522,061			–	$4,025,458	$13,598,152	$3,874,874	-	$3,874,874
Joe Biden	$1,757,394			–	$2,635,896	$8,215,739	$1,886,340	$128,210	$1,758,130
Dennis Kucinich	$1,011,696			–	$888,773	$2,130,200	$327,094	-	$327,094
Mike Gravel	$130,598			–	$144,225	$379,794	$17,527	$85,853	-$68,326

=== Republicans ===
Candidate	Money raised, 3Q	Loans received, 3Q	Money spent, 3Q	Total receipts	Cash on hand	Total debt	After debt
Rudy Giuliani	$11,624,255	–	$13,300,649	$47,253,520	$16,649,825	$169,256	$16,480,569
Mitt Romney	$9,896,719	$8,500,000	$21,301,755	$62,829,068	$9,216,517	$17,350,000	$8,133,483
Fred Thompson	$9,750,820 †	–	$5,706,366	$12,828,110	$7,121,744	$678,432	$6,443,312
Ron Paul	$5,258,455	–	$2,169,644	$8,268,452	$5,443,667	–	$5,443,667
John McCain	$5,734,477	–	$5,470,277	$32,124,785	$3,488,627	$1,730,691	$1,757,936
Mike Huckabee	$1,034,486	–	$819,376	$2,345,797	$651,300	$47,810	$603,490
Duncan Hunter	$486,356	$50,000	$618,117	$1,890,873	$132,741	$50,000	$82,741
Tom Tancredo	$767,152	–	$1,209,583	$3,538,244	$110,079	$295,603	$185,524
Sam Brownback	$925,745	–	$1,278,856	$4,235,333	$94,653	–	$94,653

† Number equals third quarter totals only. Friends of Fred Thompson Inc. received $3,077,290 covering the period June 4, 2007, to June 30, 2007, and reported $12,828,110 in total receipts for the third quarter report.

== 2nd quarter 2007 ==
Campaign Finance Information according to the Federal Election Commission as of July 17, 2007.

=== Democrats ===
Candidate	Money raised, 2Q	Money raised primaries	Money raised general	Loans received, 2Q	Money spent, 2Q	Total receipts	Cash on hand
Hillary Clinton	$27,021,358	$18,799,440.01	$5,860,372.50	–	$12,769,306	$63,075,927	$45,226,832
Barack Obama	$33,120,440	$23,502,207	$2,134,666	–	$16,042,388	$58,912,520	$36,263,689
John Edwards	$9,097,495			–	$6,485,422	$23,129,158	$13,242,954
Bill Richardson	$7,090,278			–	$4,983,067	$13,339,633	$7,129,684
Christopher Dodd	$3,280,284			–	$4,384,580	$12,076,091	$6,378,271
Joe Biden	$2,451,180			–	$2,517,654	$6,461,745	$2,772,442
Dennis Kucinich	$757,035			–	$707,653	$1,117,566	$213,269
Mike Gravel	$140,510			-$10,000	$99,866	$238,745	$31,141

=== Republicans ===
Candidate	Money raised, 2Q	Loans received, 2Q	Money spent, 2Q	Total receipts	Cash on hand
Rudy Giuliani	$17,599,292	–	$11,222,806	$35,269,625	$18,326,820
Mitt Romney	$14,275,263	$6,500,000	$20,739,814	$44,432,350	$12,121,554
John McCain	$11,591,044	–	$13,071,657	$25,328,694	$3,224,428
Ron Paul	$2,369,453	–	$539,517	$3,009,997	$2,354,855
Tom Tancredo	$1,466,188	–	$1,474,791	$2,807,879	$598,451
Mike Huckabee	$765,873	–	$702,622	$1,310,753	$437,169
Sam Brownback	$1,425,767	–	$1,798,493	$3,321,965	$433,900
Duncan Hunter	$814,417	–	$874,042	$1,352,941	$212,927
Tommy Thompson	$461,555	$25,000	$504,631	$890,398	$121,648

== 1st quarter 2007 ==
Campaign Finance Information according to the Federal Election Commission as of March 31, 2007.

=== Democrats ===
Candidate	Money raised	Money raised primaries	Money raised general	Money spent	Cash on hand
Hillary Clinton	$36,054,569	$16,709,691.30	$6,986,340.00	$5,079,789	$30,974,780
Barack Obama	$25,797,722	$19,433,812	$972,039	$6,605,201	$19,192,521
John Edwards	$14,031,663			$3,299,782	$10,731,881
Christopher Dodd	$8,795,706			$1,313,239	$7,482,467
Bill Richardson	$6,249,355			$1,226,882	$5,022,473
Joe Biden	$4,013,090			$1,174,174	$2,838,916
Dennis Kucinich	$358,569			$194,682	$163,887
Mike Gravel	$108,236			$107,737	$498

=== Republicans ===
Candidate	Money raised	Money spent	Cash on hand
Rudy Giuliani	$18,029,974	$6,080,239	$11,949,735
Mitt Romney	$21,084,634	$10,332,450	$11,863,653
John McCain	$14,798,613	$9,617,814	$5,180,799
Sam Brownback	$1,871,058	$1,064,432	$806,626
Tom Tancredo	$1,256,090	$711,012	$575,078
Ron Paul	$639,989	$115,070	$524,919
Mike Huckabee	$544,157	$170,239	$373,918
Duncan Hunter	$538,524	$265,972	$272,552
Tommy Thompson	$392,128	$252,405	$139,723
Jim Gilmore	$203,897	$113,790	$90,107
