= 2016 Texas Republican presidential primary =

- March 1, 2016
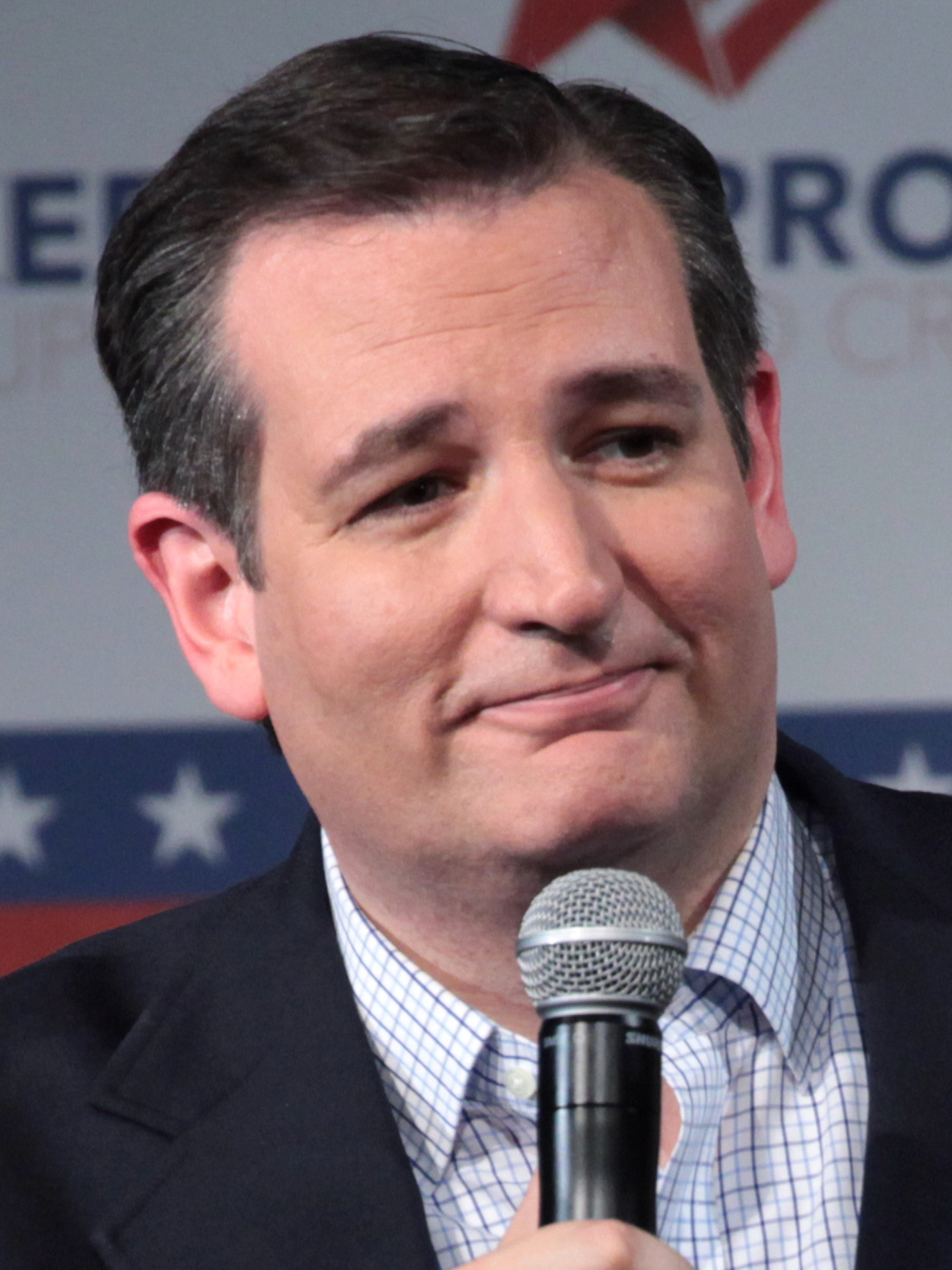

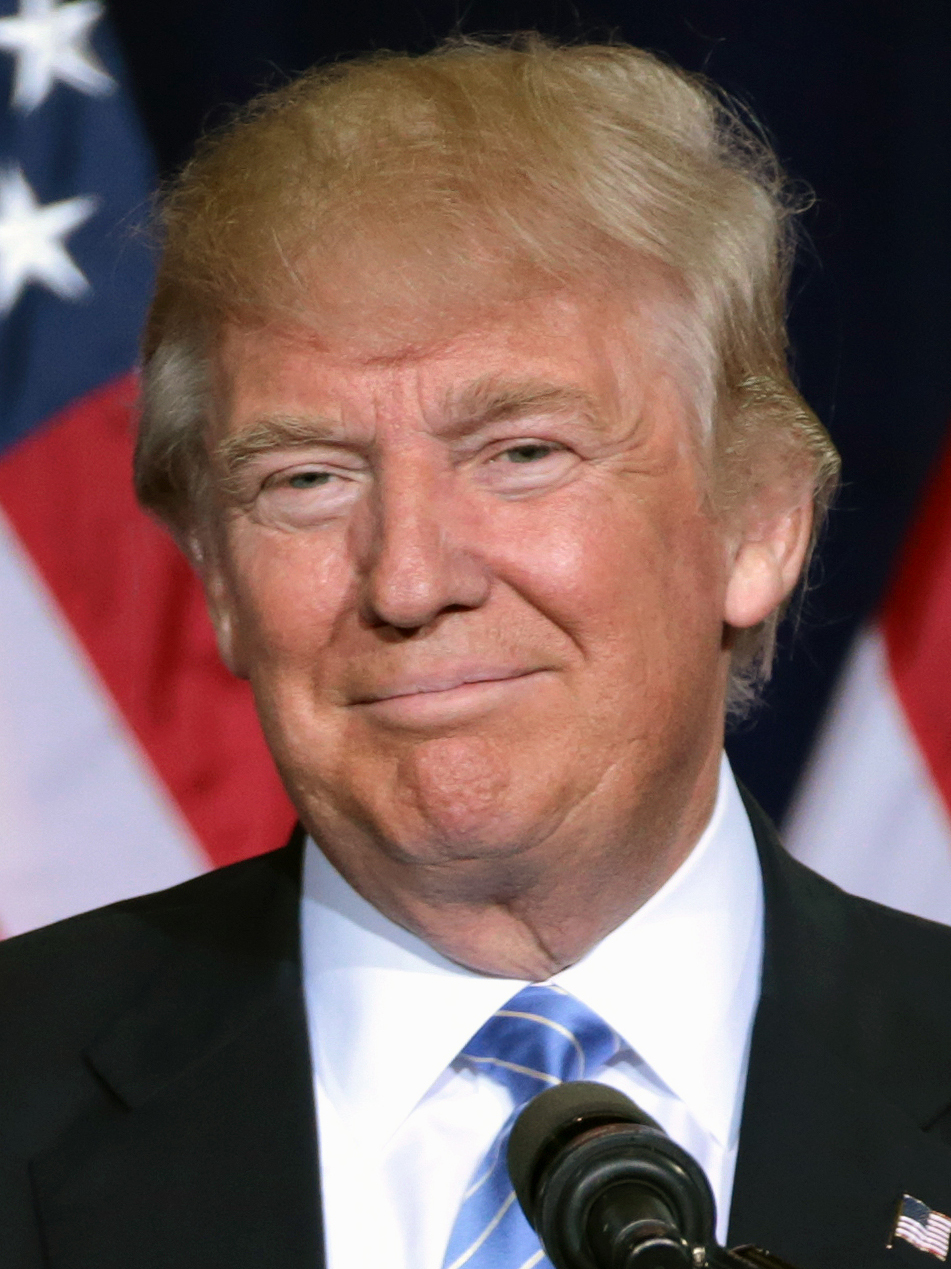

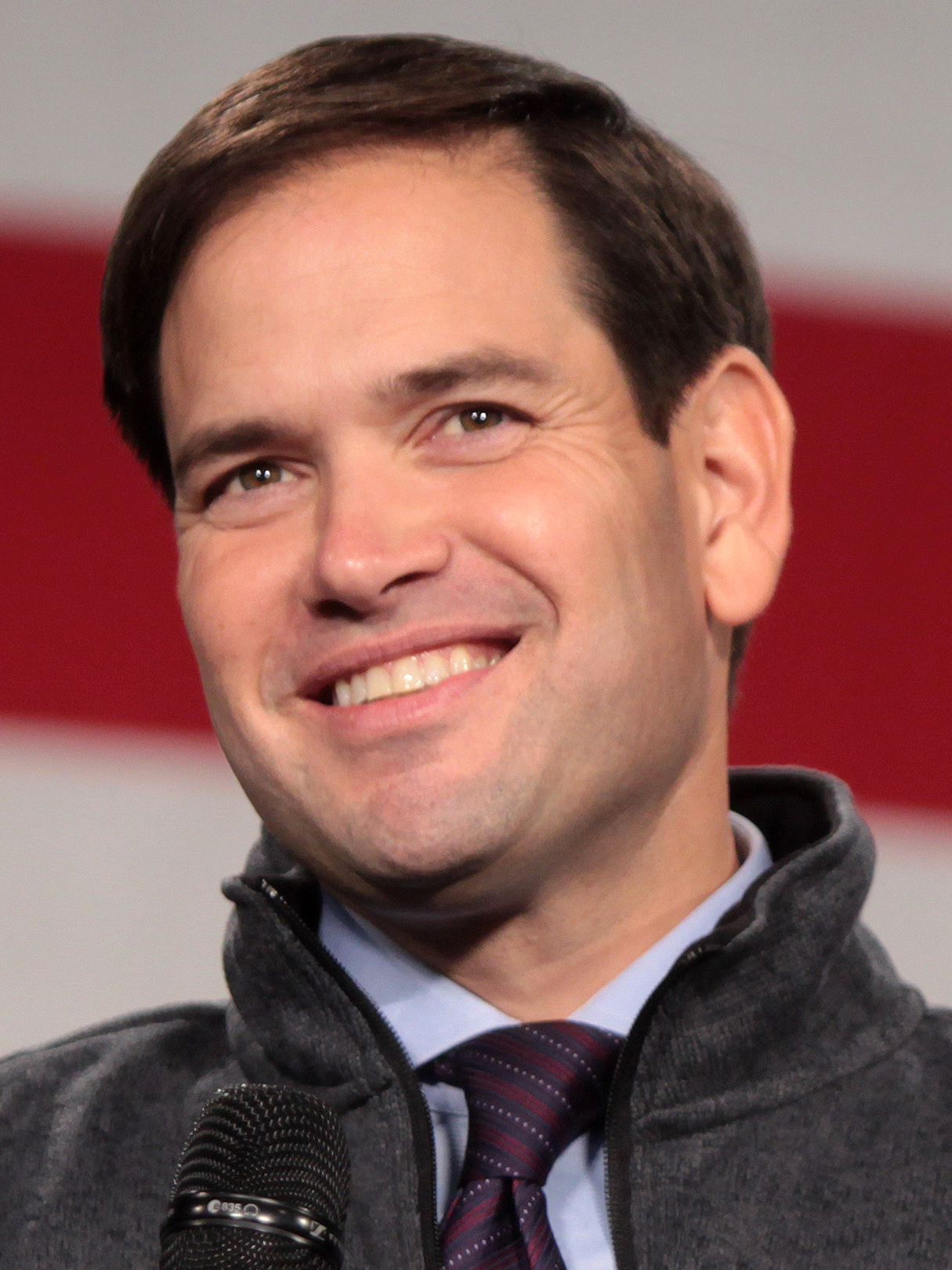
Candidate	Ted Cruz	Donald Trump	Marco Rubio
Home state	Texas	New York	Florida
Delegate count	104	48	3
Popular vote	1,241,118	758,762	503,055
Percentage	43.76%	26.75%	17.74%
Results by county
Ted Cruz 30-40% 40–50% 50–60% 60–70%	Donald Trump 30–40% 40–50%

The 2016 Texas Republican presidential primary took place on March 1 in the U.S. state of Texas as one of the Republican Party's primaries ahead of the 2016 presidential election.

On the same day, dubbed "Super Tuesday," Republican primaries were held in thirteen other states, while the Democratic Party held primaries in ten other states plus American Samoa, including their own Texas primary.

== Debates and forums ==
=== February 24, 2016 – Houston, Texas ===
Megyn Kelly hosted a two-hour town hall event on The Kelly File with Kasich, Cruz, Rubio, and Carson in attendance. Trump did not participate in the forum.

=== February 25, 2016 – Houston, Texas ===
After the caucus in Nevada, the tenth debate was held at the University of Houston in Houston and broadcast by CNN as its third of four debates, in conjunction with Telemundo. The debate aired five days before 14 states voted on Super Tuesday, March 1. While the debate was to be held in partnership with Telemundo's English-language counterpart NBC, RNC Chairman Reince Priebus announced on October 30, 2015, that it had suspended the partnership in response to CNBC's "bad faith" in handling the October 28, 2015, debate. On January 18, 2016, the RNC announced that CNN would replace NBC News as the main host of the debate, in partnership with Telemundo and Salem Communications (CNN's conservative media partner). The debate was shifted a day earlier at the same time. National Review was disinvited by the Republican National Committee from co-hosting the debate over its criticism of GOP front-runner Donald Trump. On February 19, the criteria for invitation to the debate was announced: in addition to having official statements of candidacy with the Federal Election Commission and accepting the rules of the debate, candidates must have received at least 5% support in one of the first four election contests held in Iowa, New Hampshire, South Carolina, and Nevada. By these criteria, all five remaining candidates, Carson, Cruz, Kasich, Rubio, and Trump, qualified for invitation to the debate. The 155 delegates to the Republican National Convention were allocated in this way. 108 delegates are allocated by congressional district; 3 per district. If a candidate gets over 50% of the vote in a congressional district; they would win all of the district's 3 delegates. If no one had a majority and one candidate had at least 20% of the vote, the candidate winning the plurality would get 2 delegates and the candidate in second place would get 1 delegate. If nobody receives at least 20% of the vote, the top 3 vote-getters each get 1 delegate. There were another 47 at-large delegates. If someone received more than 50% of the vote, they would get all of the at-large delegates. If no one got more than 50% of the vote and there were at least 2 candidates that got over 20% of the vote, the delegates would be allocated proportionally among the candidates receiving more than 20% of the vote. If only one candidate got over 20% of the vote and not a majority, the delegates would be allocated between the candidate that got over 20% of the vote and the candidate who received the 2nd most votes. If no candidate got 20%, they would allocate all of the 47 at-large delegates proportionally.

== Results ==
2016 Texas Republican Party presidential primary
Candidate	Popular vote		Delegates
Candidate	Count	Percentage	Delegates
Ted Cruz	1,241,118	43.76%	104
Donald Trump	758,762	26.75%	48
Marco Rubio	503,055	17.74%	3
John Kasich	120,473	4.25%	0
Ben Carson	117,969	4.16%	0
Jeb Bush	35,420	1.25%	0
Uncommitted	29,609	1.04%	0
Rand Paul	8,000	0.28%	0
Mike Huckabee	6,226	0.22%	0
Elizabeth Gray	5,449	0.19%	0
Chris Christie	3,448	0.12%	0
Carly Fiorina	3,247	0.11%	0
Rick Santorum	2,006	0.07%	0
Lindsey Graham	1,706	0.06%	0
Total:	2,836,488	100%	155

Key:	Withdrew prior to contest
