= Scott Merrick =

American politician (born 1985)

Member of the New Hampshire House of Representatives from the Coos 2nd district
- In office 2004

Personal details
- Born: 1985 (age 40–41)
- Party: Democratic

Scott Merrick (born 1985) is a Democratic Party former member of the New Hampshire House of Representatives, representing the 2nd Coos District starting in 2004. He resides in Lancaster. While serving in the legislature, he also received his degree from Tufts University.

Merrick was named a rising star, as one of New Hampshire's "Forty under Forty" by the New Hampshire Union Leader in 2009.

Merrick was elected Treasurer of the New Hampshire Young Democrats on March 14, 2013.
