= 2008 Texas Republican presidential primary =

- March 4, 2008

Nominee	John McCain	Mike Huckabee
Home state	Arizona	Arkansas
Delegate count	80	16
Popular vote	697,767	518,002
Percentage	51.22%	38.02%
- Election results by county. John McCain Mike Huckabee Tie No votes

The 2008 Texas Republican presidential primary took place on March 4, 2008. John McCain won the primary election, giving him enough delegate votes to guarantee his nomination at the 2008 Republican National Convention.

== Process ==
The Texas Republican primary process allocates delegates solely through the primary process. In addition to the candidates shown on the ballot, the ballot also shows a spot for "uncommitted".

Texas does not require a primary voter to be a registered party member – primaries are open to all voters, but a voter cannot vote in both the Republican and Democratic primaries; s/he must choose one or the other. In addition, voters who vote in a primary election cannot later sign a petition for a third-party or independent candidate to appear on the November general election ballot.

In 2008, Texas had 140 Republican delegates available for the taking, divided into three categories:

- 96 delegates selected by congressional district (as Texas has 32 districts, each district selects three delegates).
- 41 delegates selected at-large based on the statewide vote.
- Three "party leader" delegates.

The delegate split for the congressional delegates uses a modified proportional methodology:

- If a candidate receives a majority (over 50%) of the vote, s/he receives all three district delegates.
- If two candidates receive between 20% and 50% of the vote, the first place candidate receives two delegates and the second place candidate receives one delegate.
- If no candidate receives 20% of the vote, the top three candidates each receive one delegate.

The delegate split for the at-large delegates uses a similar methodology. If a candidate receives over 50% of the vote, s/he receives all 41 delegates. Otherwise, the split is proportional to the statewide vote; however, a candidate must receive at least 20% of the statewide vote to earn any delegates.

The three "party leader" delegates are officially uncommitted.

The actual delegates are selected at precinct conventions on the date of the primary, which are held after the polls close at the site where voters in a precinct cast ballots (not always the same as early voting sites). Unlike the process in the Texas Democratic Party, these conventions only select the persons who will go to the state senatorial district, state, and the national conventions. All delegates are bound by the popular vote.

== Results ==
Texas Nominating Contest Results
Candidate	Votes	Percentage	Delegates
John McCain	697,767	51.22%	80
Mike Huckabee	518,002	38.02%	16
Ron Paul	66,360	4.87%	0
Mitt Romney	27,264	2.00%	0
Fred Thompson	11,503	0.84%	0
Alan Keyes	8,260	0.61%	0
Duncan Hunter	8,222	0.60%	0
Rudy Giuliani	6,038	0.44%	0
Hugh Cort	728	0.05%	0
Hoa Tran	604	0.04%	0
Uncommitted	17,574	1.29%	0
Total	1,362,322	100%	96

The results of the Texas primary, along with the other three states (Ohio, Rhode Island, and Vermont), gave McCain the 1,191 delegates needed to secure the Republican nomination. After these primaries, Mike Huckabee ended his presidential campaign. Voter turnout was 10.8%.

== See also ==
- Latest March 4 2008 Voting Results (from TX Secretary of State)
- 2008 Republican Party presidential primaries
- 2008 Texas Democratic presidential primary and caucuses
