= 2008 Texas Democratic presidential primary and caucuses =

- March 4, 2008

Candidate	Hillary Clinton	Barack Obama
Home state	New York	Illinois
Delegate count	94	99
Primary	1,462,734 (50.88%)	1,362,476 (47.39%)
Precinct conventions	18,603 (43.72%)	23,907 (56.18%)
County conventions	3,252 (44.87%)	3,982 (54.94%)
- Clinton: 40–50% 50–60% 60–70% 70–80% 80–90% 90–100% 100% Obama: 40–50% 50–60% 60–70% 70–80% 80–90% 100% Tie: Tie; No results: No results

The 2008 Texas Democratic presidential primary and caucuses were a series of events to determine the delegates that the Texas Democratic Party sent to the 2008 Democratic National Convention. Delegates were selected using results from two sources: the Texas Presidential Primary held on March 4 by the Secretary of State of Texas's office, and a series of caucus events held between March 4 and June 7 by the Texas Democratic Party. The indecisive results of Super Tuesday, and the fact that Texas had the largest number of delegates among the states remaining on the Democratic primary calendar, resulted in the Texas primary receiving significant attention from both the Hillary Clinton and Barack Obama campaigns.

Of 12,752,417 registered voters, 22.49% turned out. The contest between the two candidates was very close: Senator Hillary Clinton won the primary, while her opponent, Senator Barack Obama, received more support in the caucuses. In the end, Obama secured 99 pledged delegates to Clinton's 94.

== Delegate breakdown ==
The Texas Democratic Party sent a total of 228 delegates to the 2008 Democratic National Convention. Of those delegates, 193 were pledged and 35 were unpledged. Most of the 193 pledged delegates were allocated at the National Convention according to the results of the Texas Presidential Primary on March 4. The 35 unpledged delegates were popularly called "superdelegates" because their votes represented their personal decisions, whereas the regular delegates' votes represented the collective decision of many voters. Superdelegates were free to vote for any candidate at the National Convention and were selected by the Texas Democratic Party's officials.

The 193 pledged delegates were further divided into 126 district delegates and 67 statewide delegates. The 126 district delegates were divided among Texas's 31 Senatorial Districts and were allocated to the presidential candidates based on the primary results in each District. The 67 statewide delegates were divided into 42 at-large delegates and 25 Party Leaders and Elected Officials (abbreviated PLEOs). They were allocated to the presidential candidates based on the preference of the delegates at the State Convention on June 6–7.

Of the 35 unpledged delegates, 32 were selected in advance and 3 were selected at the State Convention. The delegates selected in advance were 17 Democratic National Committee members, the 13 Democratic U.S. Representatives from Texas, and 2 Distinguished Party Leaders: former U.S. House Speaker Jim Wright and former DNC chairman Robert Schwarz Strauss.

== Delegate selection process ==
The Texas Democratic Party used a combination of two processes to select delegates and determine how they would be allocated to each presidential candidate. First, the Party used the results of the primary process to determine how 126 of its 193 pledged delegates would be allocated to each candidate. Second, the Party used the caucus process to select its precinct, county, state, and national delegates, and also to determine how many of the remaining 67 pledged delegates would be allocated to each candidate. Many states require that candidates receive at least 15% of the total votes to receive delegates. The Texas Democratic Party only applies this requirement to the primary process and the final step of the caucus process, since those are the only two occasions in which the Party allocates delegates to candidates.

=== Primary ===
The Texas Presidential Primary was held on March 4. It was an open primary, permitting participants to vote for candidates in any one party, regardless of voters' party affiliations. Participants were then considered as restricted to that party for the purpose of calculations regarding primaries and runoff elections for the next two years. The Primary itself was funded by the Texas State Government and administered by the Secretary of the State of Texas's office. The Texas Democratic Party used the results of the Primary to determine how its 126 district delegates would be apportioned to each presidential candidate.

Unlike other states, and even the Republican Party of Texas, the Texas Democratic Party does not allocate its delegates to Congressional Districts. Instead, it allocates its delegates to the state's 31 Senatorial Districts. The number of delegates that the Party allocates to each District depends on the votes cast in each district for the Democratic candidates during two previous general elections: Chris Bell in the 2006 Texas gubernatorial election and John Kerry in the 2004 U.S. presidential election. One effect of this allocation scheme is that districts with a high population of African-American residents are awarded a higher number of delegates, while districts with a high population of Hispanic residents are awarded a lower number.

Primary polling places were open from 7:00 a.m. until 7:00 p.m. In accordance with the law, any voter in line by 7:00 p.m. was permitted to vote. The Texas Secretary of State had a web site that provides the location of polling places. The site also offered a list of contact numbers for local county clerks and elections administrators where voters may obtain polling place location information. The Texas Democratic Party's official web site also included information about the locations of polling places.

=== Caucuses ===
The Texas Democratic Party holds three tiers of caucus events to select its delegates: precinct conventions, County and Senatorial District conventions, and a State Convention. The precinct conventions immediately followed the primary, a process in 2008 that was advertised as the "Texas Two-Step". Senator Royce West is chair of the Advisory Committee on the Texas Democratic Party Convention/Caucus System, which is charged with investigating the caucus system, including whether to retain the Texas Two Step. Former Texas Attorney general Jim Mattox testified against the Texas Two-Step at a hearing of Senator West's committee held in Austin.

==== Precinct conventions ====
The precinct conventions were held beginning March 4 at 7:15 p.m. (15 minutes after the Primary polls close) or after the last person in line at 7:00 p.m. had voted. At each precinct convention, participants chose Precinct Delegates to go to the County or Senate District conventions. The Texas Democratic Party allocated one Precinct Delegate to each precinct for every 15 votes cast for Chris Bell (the party's gubernatorial candidate) in the 2006 Texas general election.

Participation was open to anyone who voted in the Primary, whether they voted early, as an absentee, or on the day of the Primary. Participants had to sign in and provide proof that they voted in the Primary. Such proof could be provided in one of several ways: showing a registration card that was stamped at the Primary, producing an early voting receipt, providing an official photo identification that can be checked against a roll of early voters, or signing an affidavit (oath). Texas Democratic precinct conventions are governed by Robert's Rules of Order and Texas Democratic Party Rules. Participants arriving late to the convention could still participate but could not affect any voting that had already taken place.

When the time came to select the Precinct Delegates, participants declared their candidate preference, or that they were uncommitted, which is an option not available on the primary ballot. The participants in each presidential candidate preference group then chose the delegates to represent them at the County and Senate District conventions.

A total of 8,247 precinct conventions were held throughout the 254 counties in Texas, most of which were held at each precinct's Primary polling place.

Concerns had been raised in the media about the logistics in place for the precinct conventions in light of the unprecedented massive participation. For example, in Harris County —of which Houston is the seat, and in which 874 conventions are scheduled— the highest primary turn-out in the past two decades was 78,000 in 2004, whereas 170,032 have already voted early in this year's Primary. Typically about 5,000 people attend the precinct conventions held throughout Harris County; up to 100,000 were expected to participate this year. In the event, there was an estimated turnout of one million throughout the state, and as of March 11 the final result of the caucuses in Harris County was unknown., as party volunteers were still collecting packets from that county's 874 precincts. The Dallas Morning News reported a projected turnout of 1.1 million. Overall, less than half of the precincts statewide had reported to the state Democratic party by mid-March.

==== County and Senatorial District conventions ====
County and Senatorial District Conventions were held on March 29. At each convention, Precinct Delegates chose the County Delegates (7,315 in total among all the conventions) to go to the State Convention. The Texas Democratic Party allocated one County Delegate to each convention for every 180 votes cast for Chris Bell in the 2006 Texas gubernatorial election.

==== State Convention ====
The State Convention was held on June 6–7. At the Convention, the 7,315 County Delegates plus 351 state superdelegates chose 67 delegates to go to the Democratic National Convention: 42 At-large Delegates and 25 Pledged Party Leader and Elected Official (PLEO) delegates. These 67 delegates, along with the 126 district delegates, brought the total for pledged delegates to 193. The delegates at the State Convention also chose 3 "add-on" unpledged delegates to attend the Democratic National Convention.

== Polls ==
A poll of likely Democratic primary voters on March 2 showed Sen. Hillary Clinton with a statistically insignificant 50% to 49% lead, with 1% Not Sure.

== Results ==
=== Primary results ===
Primary date: March 4, 2008

National pledged delegates determined: 126 (of 193)

Key:	Withdrew prior to contest

Texas Democratic presidential primary, 2008
Candidate	Votes	Percentage	National district delegates
Hillary Clinton	1,462,734	50.88%	65
Barack Obama	1,362,476	47.39%	61
John Edwards	29,936	1.04%	0
Bill Richardson	10,773	0.37%	0
Joe Biden	5,290	0.18%	0
Christopher Dodd	3,777	0.13%	0
Totals	2,874,986	100.00%	126

=== Precinct convention results ===
Convention date: March 4, 2008

National pledged delegates determined: 0 (of 193)

Texas Democratic presidential precinct conventions, 2008 41.10% of precincts reporting
Candidate	Precinct delegates	Percentage	Estimated national At-Large and PLEO delegates
Barack Obama	23,918	56.18%	38
Hillary Clinton	18,620	43.73%	29
Other	6	0.01%	0
Uncommitted	38	0.09%	0
Undetermined	45,492	-	0
Totals	88,074	100.00%	67

==== Challenged results ====
On March 14, the Clinton campaign issued a letter to the Texas Democratic Party challenging the results of its precinct conventions. The letter proposed that the Party delay the County and Senatorial District conventions until it could provide the campaign with "presidential preference counts [that] can be made based on a review of each and every sign in sheet to determine eligibility of participants and delegates". Texas Democratic Chairman Boyd Richie issued a statement on March 17 rejecting the proposal, stating that the Texas Democratic Party "will not set up an unnecessary, ad hoc 'verification' process that could effectively disqualify delegates selected at their precinct conventions after the fact."

=== County and Senatorial District convention results ===
Convention date: March 29, 2008

National pledged delegates determined: 0 (of 193)

Texas Democratic presidential County and Senatorial District conventions, 2008 89.79% of districts representing 96.60% of the delegates reporting
Candidate	County delegates	Percentage	Estimated national At-Large and PLEO delegates
Barack Obama	4,039	54.71%	37
Hillary Clinton	3,317	44.93%	30
Uncommitted	26	00.35%	0
Totals	7,382	100.00%	67
Undetermined	260	(3.40%)	-

=== State Convention results ===
Convention date: June 6–7, 2008

National pledged delegates determined: 67 (of 193)

Texas Democratic presidential state convention, 2008
Candidate	Votes	Percentage	National At-Large and PLEO delegates
Barack Obama	?	57.3%	38
Hillary Clinton	?	42.7%	29
Totals	7,649	100%	67

== See also ==
- 2008 Democratic Party presidential primaries
- 2008 Texas Republican presidential primary
