= Bedell =

Bedell may refer to:

== People ==
- Arthur Bedell (fl.1572), English MP for Lichfield
- Berkley Bedell (1921–2019), American politician
- Frederick Bedell (1868–1958), cofounder of Physical Review, the first American journal of physics
- Geraldine Bedell, journalist and author
- Grace Bedell (1848–1936), author of a letter to President Lincoln that inspired his beard
- Gregory T. Bedell (1817–1892), Episcopal Bishop of Ohio
- Howie Bedell (born 1935), former Major League Baseball player
- Lew Bedell (1919–2000), comedian and founder of the Era and Doré record labels
- John Patrick Bedell, gunman involved in the 2010 Pentagon shooting
- Ralph Clairon Bedell, Chief Executive of the Secretariat of the Pacific Community 1955–1958
- Richard Bedell (died 1572), English MP
- William Bedell (1571–1642), Anglican churchman

== Other uses ==
- Bedel or Bedell, an administrative official at universities in several European countries
- Bedell (company), a legal and fiduciary firm
- Bedell Crossing, Maine, a village, United States
- Bedell (department store), a former national department stores that went bankrupt in 1931
- Bedell, New Brunswick, a settlement, Canada
- Bedell, New York, a hamlet, United States
- Bedell Building, former name of Cascade Building, Portland, Oregon, United States
- Bedell Covered Bridge, New Hampshire, United States
- Esquire Bedell, a junior ceremonial officer of a university

== See also ==
- Beadle (disambiguation)
- Bedel (disambiguation)
- David Bedell-Sivright (1880–1915), Scottish international rugby union captain
- Walter Bedell Smith (1895–1961), Dwight D. Eisenhower's Chief of Staff, often referred to as "Beetle" Smith
