= 2008 United States presidential election in New York =

- November 4, 2008
- Turnout: 63.51% (▲1.07 pp)

Nominee	Barack Obama	John McCain
Party	Democratic	Republican
Alliance	Working Families	Parties: Conservative; Independence
Home state	Illinois	Arizona
Running mate	Joe Biden	Sarah Palin
Electoral vote	31	0
Popular vote	4,804,945	2,752,771
Percentage	62.88%	36.03%

Obama
40–50%
50–60%
60–70%
70–80%
80–90%
90–100%
McCain
40–50%
50–60%
60–70%
70–80%
Tie
President before election
George W. Bush
Republican
Elected President
Barack Obama
Democratic

The 2008 United States presidential election in New York took place on November 4, 2008, and was part of the 2008 United States presidential election. Voters chose 31 representatives, or electors to the Electoral College, who voted for president and vice president.

Barack Obama won the state of New York with a decisive 26.9% margin of victory. Obama took 62.88% of the vote to McCain's 36.03%. At the time this was the highest Democratic vote share in New York State since 1964, although Obama would outperform his 2008 showing in New York just four years later in 2012. Prior to the election, all 17 news organizations considered this a state Obama would win, or otherwise considered as a safe blue state. Located in the Northeast, a region of the country that is trending heavily towards the Democrats, elections in New York are dominated by the presence of the heavily populated, heavily diverse, liberal bastion of New York City where Democrats tend to be heavily favored to win.

As of the 2024 presidential election, this is the last election in which Chautauqua County voted for the Democratic candidate.

== Primaries ==
- 2008 New York Democratic presidential primary
- 2008 New York Republican presidential primary

== Campaign ==
=== Predictions ===
There were 16 news organizations who made state-by-state predictions of the election. Here are their last predictions before election day:

Source	Ranking
D.C. Political Report	Likely D
Cook Political Report	Solid D
The Takeaway	Solid D
Electoral-vote.com	Solid D
Washington Post	Solid D
Politico	Solid D
RealClearPolitics	Solid D
FiveThirtyEight	Solid D
CQ Politics	Solid D
The New York Times	Solid D
CNN	Safe D
NPR	Solid D
MSNBC	Solid D
Fox News	Likely D
Associated Press	Likely D
Rasmussen Reports	Safe D

=== Polling ===
Obama won all but one pre-election poll. Since September 15, Obama won each poll with a double-digit margin of victory and each with at least 55% of the vote. He won the final Marist poll with a 36-point spread. The final 3 polls averaged Obama leading 63% to 31%.

=== Fundraising ===
McCain raised a total of $12,582,856 in the state. Barack Obama raised $58,161,743.

=== Advertising and visits ===
Obama and his interest groups spent $1,148,016. McCain and his interest groups spent just $7,310. The Republican visited the state 11 times and the Democratic ticket visited the state 4 times.

== Analysis ==
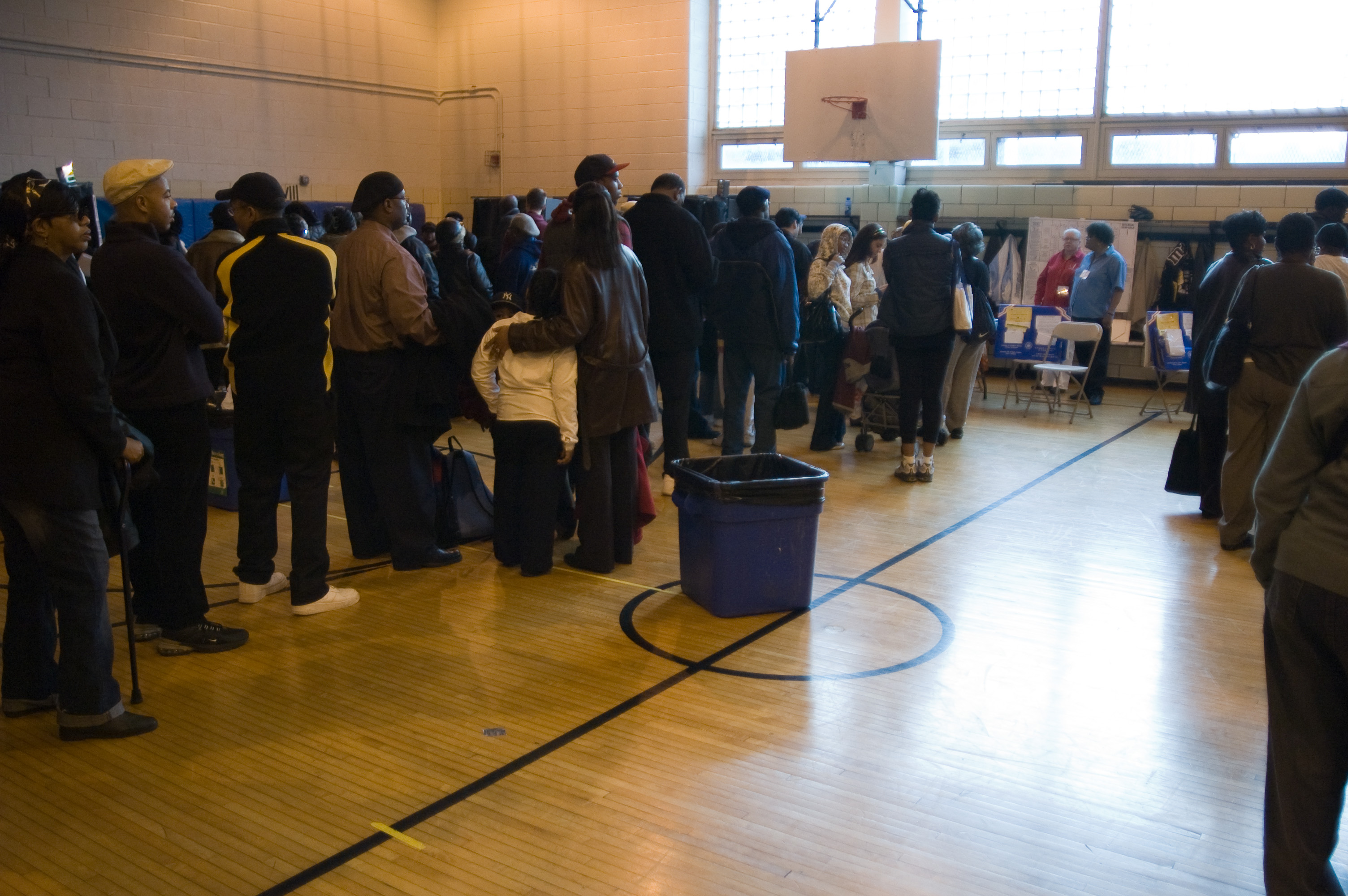
Voting taking place in a New York City polling station

New York was once reckoned as a powerful swing state with a slight Democratic lean. However, the last time the state went Republican was for Ronald Reagan in 1984. Michael Dukakis narrowly won it against George H. W. Bush in 1988, but the state has not been seriously contested since then. It is now considered an uncontested blue state, and was heavily favored to vote for Obama by a significant margin.

Elections in New York are dominated by the presence of New York City, a Democratic stronghold for more than a century and a half. It is made up mostly of white liberals as well as ethnic and religious minorities—all voting blocs that strongly vote Democratic. Obama won Manhattan, Brooklyn and the Bronx by margins of 5-to-1 or more and carried Queens by a 3-to-1 margin. The only borough McCain carried was Staten Island, traditionally the most conservative area of the city. Obama's combined million-vote margin in the Five Boroughs would have been enough by itself to carry the state.

However, Obama also dominated heavily Democratic Western New York, including Buffalo and Rochester, and the Capital District (Albany, Schenectady and Troy), as well as the increasingly Democratic Long Island and Syracuse areas. Even when New York was considered a swing state, a Republican had to carry Long Island and do reasonably well in either Western New York, the Capital District or Syracuse to make up for the massive Democratic margins in New York City. Obama also won a number of traditionally Republican-leaning counties in Upstate New York and became the first Democrat since Lyndon B. Johnson to win an outright majority of votes in the Upstate (although Democratic candidates had been consistently winning pluralities of the vote since 1992). Barack Obama dominated in fiercely Democratic New York City, taking 2,074,159 votes to John McCain's 524,787, giving Obama a 79.29%–20.06% landslide victory citywide. Excluding the votes of New York City, Obama still would have carried New York State, but by a smaller margin. Obama would have received 2,730,786 votes to McCain's 2,227,984, giving Obama a 55.06%–44.93% victory.

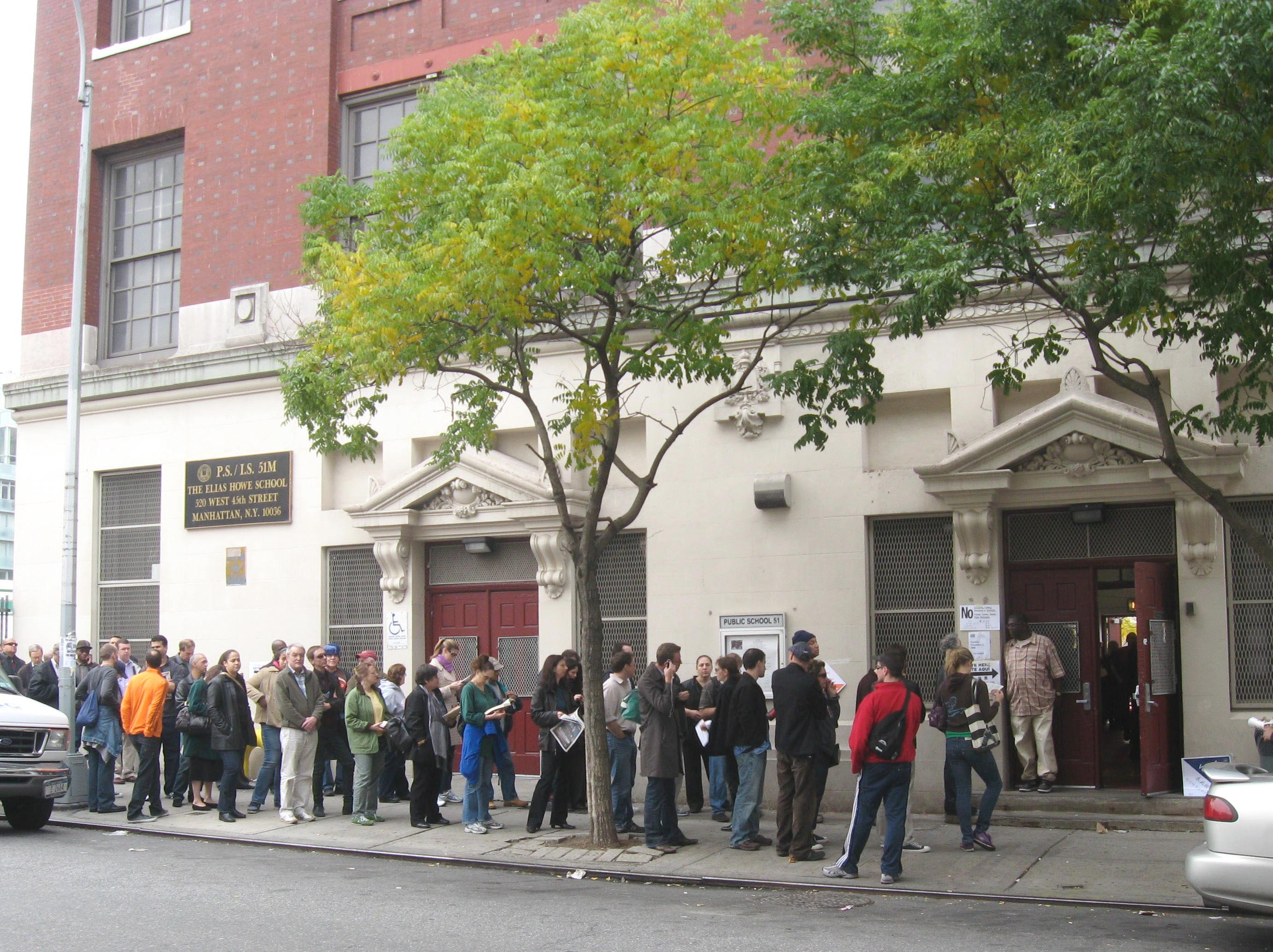
Voters lined-up outside a polling station in Hell's Kitchen, Manhattan

At the same time, Democrats in New York picked up three seats in the U.S. House of Representatives in 2008. In the 13th district, which consists of Staten Island and part of Brooklyn, Democrats picked up an open seat that was vacated by former Republican Vito Fossella who resigned after he was arrested for getting a DUI. Democrat Michael McMahon solidly defeated Republican Robert Staniere by a two-to-one margin, 60.79–33.26%. His victory made the city's delegation entirely Democratic for the first time in over 70 years. In the 25th district, centered around Syracuse, Democrat Dan Maffei handily defeated Republican Dale Sweetland 55% to 42% for the open seat vacated by Republican Jim Walsh. In New York's 29th congressional district, which includes Canandaigua, Democrat Eric Massa narrowly defeated incumbent Republican Randy Kuhl by 1.7 points. This reduced the Republicans to only three of the state's 29 seats in the House—the fewest the GOP has ever won in an election. At the state level, Democrats picked up a seat in the New York State Assembly and two seats in the New York State Senate which gave Democrats control of the Senate and ultimately both chambers of the New York Legislature for the first time since 1966. This gave the Democrats complete control of New York's state government for the first time since 1935.

== Results ==
2008 United States presidential election in New York
Party	Candidate	Running mate	Votes	Percentage	Electoral votes
Democratic	Barack Obama		4,645,332	60.80%	
Working Families	Barack Obama		159,613	2.09%	
Total	Barack Obama	Joe Biden	4,804,945	62.88%	31
Republican	John McCain		2,418,323	31.65%	
Conservative	John McCain		170,475	2.23%	
Independence	John McCain		163,973	2.15%	
Total	John McCain	Sarah Palin	2,752,771	36.03%	0
Populist	Ralph Nader	Matt Gonzalez	41,249	0.54%	0
Libertarian	Bob Barr	Wayne Allyn Root	19,596	0.26%	0
Green	Cynthia McKinney	Rosa Clemente	12,801	0.17%	0
Socialist Workers	James Harris	Alyson Kennedy	3,615	0.05%	0
Write-ins	Write-ins		3,272	0.04%	0
Socialism and Liberation	Gloria La Riva	Eugene Puryear	1,639	0.02%	0
Constitution (write-in)	Chuck Baldwin	Darrell Castle	646	0.01%	0
Independent (write-in)	Ron Paul		341	>0.01%	0
America's Independent (write-in)	Alan Keyes	Brian Rohrbough	35	>0.01%	0
Socialist Equality (write-in)	Jerry White	Bill Van Auken	18	>0.01%	0
Socialist (write-in)	Brian Moore	Stewart Alexander	10	>0.01%	0
Independent (write-in)	Lanakila Washington		3	>0.01%	0
Heartquake '08 (write-in)	Jonathan E. Allen		1	>0.01%	0
Independent (write-in)	Michael Skok		1	>0.01%	0
Totals			7,640,943	100.00%	31
Voter turnout (voting age population)					52.1%

=== New York City results ===
2008 presidential election in New York City		Manhattan	The Bronx	Brooklyn	Queens	Staten Island	Total	
Democratic- Working Families	Barack Obama	572,370	338,261	603,525	480,692	79,311	2,074,159	79.29%
Democratic- Working Families	Barack Obama	85.70%	88.71%	79.43%	75.09%	47.61%	2,074,159	79.29%
Republican- Conservative- Independence	John McCain	89,949	41,683	151,872	155,221	86,062	524,787	20.06%
Republican- Conservative- Independence	John McCain	13.47%	10.93%	19.99%	24.25%	51.66%	524,787	20.06%
Populist	Ralph Nader	2,187	475	1,720	1,933	598	6,913	0.26%
Populist	Ralph Nader	0.33%	0.12%	0.23%	0.30%	0.36%	6,913	0.26%
Green	Cynthia McKinney	1,288	425	1,292	1,019	210	4,234	0.16%
Green	Cynthia McKinney	0.19%	0.11%	0.17%	0.16%	0.13%	4,234	0.16%
Libertarian	Bob Barr	1,378	209	876	768	217	3,448	0.13%
Libertarian	Bob Barr	0.21%	0.05%	0.12%	0.12%	0.13%	3,448	0.13%
Socialist Workers	Róger Calero	252	124	207	252	49	884	0.03%
Socialist Workers	Róger Calero	0.04%	0.03%	0.03%	0.04%	0.03%	884	0.03%
Socialism and Liberation	Gloria La Riva	110	103	153	128	24	518	0.02%
Socialism and Liberation	Gloria La Riva	0.02%	0.03%	0.02%	0.02%	0.01%	518	0.02%
Others		351	42	203	124	107	371	0.02%
Others		0.05%	0.01%	0.03%	0.02%	0.06%	371	0.02%
TOTAL		667,885	381,322	759,848	640,137	166,578	2,615,770	100.00%

=== By county ===
County	Barack Obama Democratic		John McCain Republican		Various candidates Other parties		Margin		Total votes cast
County	#	%	#	%	#	%	#	%	Total votes cast
Albany	93,937	63.79%	50,586	34.35%	2,743	1.86%	43,351	29.44%	147,266
Allegany	7,016	38.12%	11,013	59.83%	377	2.05%	−3,997	−21.71%	18,406
Bronx	338,261	88.71%	41,683	10.93%	1,378	0.36%	296,578	77.78%	381,322
Broome	47,204	53.14%	40,077	45.11%	1,556	1.75%	7,127	8.03%	88,837
Cattaraugus	14,307	43.86%	17,770	54.48%	540	1.66%	−3,463	−10.62%	32,617
Cayuga	18,128	53.28%	15,243	44.80%	651	1.92%	2,885	8.48%	34,022
Chautauqua	29,129	49.54%	28,579	48.60%	1,094	1.86%	550	0.94%	58,802
Chemung	18,888	48.81%	19,364	50.04%	443	1.15%	−476	−1.23%	38,695
Chenango	10,100	48.45%	10,337	49.59%	410	1.96%	−237	−1.14%	20,847
Clinton	20,216	60.64%	12,579	37.73%	542	1.63%	7,637	22.91%	33,337
Columbia	17,556	55.85%	13,337	42.43%	540	1.72%	4,219	13.42%	31,433
Cortland	11,861	54.11%	9,678	44.15%	381	1.74%	2,183	9.96%	21,920
Delaware	9,462	46.41%	10,524	51.62%	403	1.97%	−1,062	−5.21%	20,389
Dutchess	71,060	53.71%	59,628	45.07%	1,614	1.22%	11,432	8.64%	132,302
Erie	256,299	57.99%	178,815	40.46%	6,871	1.55%	77,484	17.53%	441,985
Essex	10,390	55.88%	7,913	42.55%	292	1.57%	2,477	13.33%	18,595
Franklin	10,571	60.34%	6,676	38.11%	273	1.55%	3,895	22.23%	17,520
Fulton	9,695	44.42%	11,709	53.65%	420	1.93%	−2,014	−9.23%	21,824
Genesee	10,762	40.02%	15,705	58.40%	423	1.58%	−4,943	−18.38%	26,890
Greene	9,850	44.10%	12,059	53.99%	426	1.91%	−2,209	−9.89%	22,335
Hamilton	1,225	35.91%	2,141	62.77%	45	1.32%	−916	−26.86%	3,411
Herkimer	12,094	44.49%	14,619	53.78%	471	1.73%	−2,525	−9.29%	27,184
Jefferson	18,166	46.72%	20,220	52.00%	500	1.28%	−2,054	−5.28%	38,886
Kings	603,525	79.43%	151,872	19.99%	4,451	0.58%	451,653	59.44%	759,848
Lewis	4,986	44.77%	5,969	53.59%	183	1.64%	−983	−8.82%	11,138
Livingston	13,655	45.29%	16,030	53.17%	484	1.54%	−2,375	−7.88%	30,149
Madison	14,692	49.30%	14,434	48.43%	676	2.27%	258	0.87%	29,802
Monroe	207,371	58.18%	144,262	40.47%	4,781	1.35%	63,109	17.71%	356,424
Montgomery	9,080	45.01%	10,711	53.09%	384	1.90%	−1,631	−8.08%	20,175
Nassau	342,185	53.84%	288,776	45.43%	4,657	0.73%	53,409	8.41%	635,618
New York	572,370	85.70%	89,949	13.47%	5,566	0.83%	482,421	72.23%	667,885
Niagara	47,303	49.65%	46,348	48.65%	1,621	1.70%	955	1.00%	95,272
Oneida	43,506	46.10%	49,256	52.20%	1,603	1.70%	−5,750	−6.10%	94,365
Onondaga	129,317	59.25%	84,972	38.94%	3,950	1.81%	44,345	20.31%	218,239
Ontario	25,103	49.20%	25,171	49.34%	746	1.46%	−68	−0.14%	51,020
Orange	78,326	51.54%	72,042	47.40%	1,614	1.06%	6,284	4.14%	151,982
Orleans	6,614	39.88%	9,708	58.54%	262	1.58%	−3,094	−18.66%	16,584
Oswego	24,777	50.21%	23,571	47.76%	1,001	2.03%	1,206	2.45%	49,349
Otsego	13,570	51.95%	12,026	46.04%	525	2.01%	1,544	5.91%	26,121
Putnam	21,613	45.75%	25,145	53.22%	486	1.03%	−3,532	−7.47%	47,244
Queens	480,692	75.09%	155,221	24.25%	4,224	0.76%	325,471	50.84%	640,137
Rensselaer	39,753	53.73%	32,840	44.39%	1,393	1.88%	6,913	9.34%	73,986
Richmond	79,311	47.61%	86,062	51.66%	1,205	0.73%	−6,751	−4.05%	166,578
Rockland	69,543	52.61%	61,752	46.71%	898	0.68%	7,791	5.90%	132,193
Saratoga	56,645	50.85%	52,855	47.45%	1,887	1.70%	3,790	3.40%	111,387
Schenectady	38,611	55.28%	29,758	42.61%	1,473	2.11%	8,853	12.67%	69,842
Schoharie	6,009	41.72%	8,071	56.04%	322	2.24%	−2,062	−14.32%	14,402
Schuyler	3,933	45.73%	4,542	52.81%	125	1.46%	−609	−7.08%	8,600
Seneca	7,422	50.35%	7,038	47.74%	281	1.91%	384	2.61%	14,741
St. Lawrence	23,706	57.36%	16,956	41.03%	664	1.61%	6,750	16.33%	41,326
Steuben	17,148	40.92%	24,203	57.75%	560	1.33%	−7,055	−16.83%	41,911
Suffolk	346,549	52.53%	307,021	46.53%	6,209	0.94%	39,528	6.00%	659,779
Sullivan	16,850	54.04%	13,900	44.58%	433	1.38%	2,950	9.46%	31,183
Tioga	10,172	43.98%	12,536	54.20%	423	1.82%	−2,364	−10.22%	23,131
Tompkins	29,826	70.09%	11,927	28.03%	799	1.88%	17,899	42.06%	42,552
Ulster	54,320	60.93%	33,300	37.35%	1,529	1.72%	21,020	23.58%	89,149
Warren	16,281	50.49%	15,429	47.85%	535	1.66%	852	2.64%	32,245
Washington	12,741	49.52%	12,533	48.71%	456	1.77%	208	0.81%	25,730
Wayne	18,184	44.30%	22,239	54.18%	622	1.52%	−4,055	−9.88%	41,045
Westchester	261,810	63.39%	147,824	35.79%	3,410	0.82%	113,986	27.60%	413,044
Wyoming	6,379	36.11%	10,998	62.25%	290	1.64%	−4,619	−26.14%	17,667
Yates	4,890	47.57%	5,269	51.25%	121	1.18%	−379	−3.68%	10,280
Totals	4,804,945	62.88%	2,752,771	36.03%	83,232	1.09%	2,052,174	26.85%	7,640,948

Counties that flipped from Republican to Democratic

- Dutchess (county seat: Poughkeepsie)
- Orange (county seat: Goshen)
- Rockland (county seat: New City)
- Saratoga (county seat: Ballston Spa)
- Cayuga (county seat: Auburn)
- Chautauqua (county seat: Mayville)
- Cortland (county seat: Cortland)
- Essex (county seat: Elizabethtown)
- Otsego (county seat: Cooperstown)
- Seneca (county seat: Waterloo)
- Sullivan (county seat: Monticello)
- Oswego (county seat: Waterloo)
- Washington (county seat: Hudson Falls)
- Madison (county seat: Wampsville)
- Warren (county seat: Queensbury)

=== By congressional district ===
Barack Obama won 25 of the state's 29 districts, including one held by a Republican. McCain carried 4 districts, including two that elected Democrats.

District	McCain	Obama	Representative
1st	47.62%	51.44%	Tim Bishop
2nd	43.09%	56.13%	Steve Israel
3rd	51.90%	47.27%	Peter T. King
4th	41.35%	57.99%	Carolyn McCarthy
5th	36.06%	63.24%	Gary Ackerman
6th	10.68%	89.03%	Gregory W. Meeks
7th	20.37%	79.12%	Joseph Crowley
8th	25.45%	73.70%	Jerrold Nadler
9th	43.92%	55.32%	Anthony D. Weiner
10th	8.70%	91.03%	Edolphus Towns
11th	9.07%	90.49%	Yvette D. Clark
12th	13.12%	86.17%	Nydia Velasquez
13th	50.56%	48.74%	Vito Fossella (110th Congress)
13th	50.56%	48.74%	Michael McMahon (111th Congress)
14th	20.92%	78.19%	Carolyn B. Maloney
15th	6.17%	93.21%	Charlie Rangel
16th	5.04%	94.76%	Jose Serrano
17th	27.53%	71.92%	Eliot L. Engel
18th	37.57%	61.66%	Nita Lowey
19th	48.37%	50.65%	John Hall
20th	47.70%	50.70%	Kirsten Gillibrand (110th Congress)
20th	47.70%	50.70%	Scott Murphy (111th Congress)
21st	40.00%	58.14%	Paul Tonko
22nd	39.31%	59.23%	Maurice Hinchey
23rd	46.59%	51.81%	John M. McHugh
24th	47.97%	50.33%	Mike Arcuri
25th	42.62%	55.74%	James T. Walsh (110th Congress)
25th	42.62%	55.74%	Dan Maffei (111th Congress)
26th	52.15%	46.43%	Thomas M. Reynolds (110th Congress)
26th	52.15%	46.43%	Christopher Lee (111th Congress)
27th	44.03%	54.19%	Brian Higgins
28th	30.29%	68.47%	Louise Slaughter
29th	50.46%	48.24%	Randy Kuhl (110th Congress)
29th	50.46%	48.24%	Eric Massa (111th Congress)

== Electors ==
Technically the voters of New York cast their ballots for electors: representatives to the Electoral College. New York is allocated 31 electors because it had 29 congressional districts under the 2000 census and 2 senators. All candidates who appear on the ballot or qualify to receive write-in votes must submit a list of 31 electors, who pledge to vote for their candidate and their running mate. Whoever wins the majority of votes in the state is awarded all 31 electoral votes. Their chosen electors then vote for president and vice president. Although electors are pledged to their candidate and running mate, they are not obligated to vote for them. An elector who votes for someone other than their candidate is known as a faithless elector.

The electors of each state and the District of Columbia met on December 15, 2008, to cast their votes for president and vice president. The Electoral College itself never meets as one body. Instead the electors from each state and the District of Columbia met in their respective capitols.

The following were the members of the Electoral College from the state. All 31 electors were pledged to Barack Obama and Joe Biden:

1. Velda Jeffrey
2. June O'Neill
3. Dennis Mehiel
4. David Paterson
5. Andrew Cuomo
6. Thomas DiNapoli
7. Sheldon Silver
8. Malcolm Smith
9. Maria Luna
10. Robert Master
11. Pamela Green-Perkins
12. Helen D. Foster
13. Jon Cooper
14. Hakeem Jeffries
15. Richard Fife
16. Deborah Slott
17. Terrence Yang
18. George Arthur
19. George Gresham
20. Alan Van Capelle
21. Inez Dickens
22. Suzy Ballantyne
23. Alan Lubin
24. Bethaida Gonzalez
25. Christine Quinn
26. William Thompson
27. Stuart Applebaum
28. Maritza Davila
29. Ivan Young
30. Barbara J. Fiala
31. Frank A. Bolz

== See also ==
- United States presidential elections in New York
- Presidency of Barack Obama
