= Bedel (disambiguation) =

A bedel is an administrative official at universities in several European countries.

Bedel may also refer to:

- Bedel (surname)
- Bedel (occupation), a title given to a Saxon officer who summoned householders to council
- Bedel Pass, a mountain pass in the Tian-Shan mountain range

== See also ==
- Bedell (disambiguation)
- Beadle (disambiguation)
- Beedle
