= Bedle =

Bedle is a surname. Notable people with the surname include:

- John Bedle (died 1667), English clergyman
- Joseph D. Bedle (1831–1894), American politician
- William Bedle (1679–1768), English cricketer

== See also ==
- Beadle (disambiguation)
