= 2008 United States presidential election in Iowa =

- November 4, 2008

| Nominee | Barack Obama | John McCain |
| Party | Democratic | Republican |
| Home state | Illinois | Arizona |
| Running mate | Joe Biden | Sarah Palin |
| Electoral vote | 7 | 0 |
| Popular vote | 828,940 | 682,379 |
| Percentage | 53.93% | 44.39% |

Obama
40–50%
50–60%
60–70%
70–80%
80–90%
90–100%
McCain
40–50%
50–60%
60–70%
70–80%
80–90%
90–100%
President before election
George W. Bush
Republican
Elected President
Barack Obama
Democratic

The 2008 United States presidential election in Iowa took place on November 4, 2008, as part of the 2008 United States presidential election. Voters chose seven representatives, or electors to the Electoral College, who voted for president and vice president.

Iowa was won by the Democratic nominee, Senator Barack Obama of Illinois, by a 9.54% margin of victory. Obama took 53.93% of the vote while his Republican opponent, Senator John McCain of Arizona, took 44.39%. Prior to the election, all 16 organizations considered this a state Obama would win, or otherwise considered it a safe blue state. In 2004, Republican George W. Bush very narrowly won Iowa in his reelection bid, although prior to that, the state had gone Democratic for four consecutive presidential elections. A Midwestern state where agriculture plays a critical role in the daily lives of its citizens, Iowa is nevertheless an independent state. However, due to Obama's popularity from the Iowa caucuses, the nationwide backlash against the Bush administration, and the poor state of the economy, the state easily fell into the Democratic column later in the election cycle. Obama's 828,940 votes are the most received by a Democratic presidential candidate in the state's history.

As of the 2024 presidential election, this is the last election in which Adams County, Audubon County, Benton County, Carroll County, Crawford County, Delaware County, Emmet County, Franklin County, Greene County, Hamilton County, Hardin County, Iowa County, Kossuth County, Palo Alto County, Warren County, and Winnebago County voted for the Democratic candidate. This was also the last time a majority of Iowa's counties went to the Democratic presidential candidate.

Iowa is also one of only three states that backed Obama twice that would go on to vote against his vice president Joe Biden in 2020, the other two being Florida and Ohio.

== Caucuses ==
The 2008 Iowa caucuses took place on January 3, 2008. They are an unofficial primary, with the delegates to the state convention selected proportionally via a straw poll. The Iowa caucuses mark the traditional formal start of the delegate selection process for the 2008 United States presidential election. It was the first election of the 2008 presidential election. Also referred to as "the First in the Nation Caucus," it was the first election of the primary season on both the Democratic and Republican sides.

=== Democratic caucuses ===
Of the eight major Democratic presidential candidates, then-U.S. Senator Barack Obama of Illinois received the most votes and was ultimately declared the winner of the Iowa Democratic Caucus of 2008, making him the first African American to win the caucus. Former U.S. Senator John Edwards of North Carolina came in second place and then-U.S. Senator Hillary Clinton of New York finished third, though Clinton received more delegates than Edwards. Campaigning had begun as early as two years before the event.

==== History ====
The Iowa Caucuses have historically been the first held in the United States. The caucus marked the traditional and formal start of the delegate selection process for the 2008 United States presidential election, and the process in which members of the Democratic Party gathered to make policy decisions.

Iowa state law mandates that its caucus must be held at least eight days before any other meeting, caucus, or primary for the presidential nominating process. Therefore, the Iowa Caucuses have always been traditionally the leading state in the nominating process. Not only did controversy brew between the candidates, but the caucuses themselves drew a large amount of media attention. The decisions of the Iowans often affect the rest of the campaign season. Barack Obama's victory in Iowa helped establish him as one of the Democratic frontrunners of 2008 and was a first step toward his eventual nomination.

==== Process ====
The caucuses followed the regular procedures of the Democratic Party process. Any voter who was a registered Democrat and a resident of Iowa was eligible to participate in the event. Individuals could have chosen to register or change their party affiliation at the door. It was estimated that 60 percent of the caucusgoers would have attended the caucuses for the first time. All of the caucusgoers met in public buildings or schools in their respective precincts and divided themselves into groups; each group represented a candidate. The voting was done publicly (viva voce). To be viable, each preference group/candidate must have had at least 15 percent of the caucusgoers' votes. If a candidate received less than 15 percent of the caucusgoers' votes, then the supporters of that non-viable candidate had 30 minutes to join a viable candidate's group, join another non-viable candidate's group to make the candidate viable, join an uncommitted group, or choose not to be counted as a voter.

In Iowa, there were 1,784 precincts for the caucuses. Each viable preference group at each caucus elected a certain number of delegates proportional to the group's size that would represent the candidate at the county conventions. There are 99 counties in Iowa, and their Democratic conventions took place on March 15, 2008. At these conventions, a subset of delegates were chosen to attend the district, then state conventions. At the Iowa Democratic Party State Convention on June 14, 2008, a subset of delegates were chosen to attend the Democratic National Convention held August 25–28, 2008, in Denver, Colorado. As in the precinct caucuses, the pledged delegates to the national convention proportionally represented the candidates compared to the results of the state caucus.

===== Delegate allocation =====
The delegate allocation to the Democratic National Convention was as follows: 29 district delegates proportionally represented a candidate's support at each congressional district. The First Congressional District receives six pledged delegates, the Second Congressional District receives seven, the Third Congressional District receives six, the Fourth Congressional District receives six, and the Fifth Congressional District receives four. All of these pledged delegates represent each congressional district independently; they are not affected by the results of the state convention.

At the Iowa Democratic Party State Convention, on the other hand, 16 pledged delegates proportionally represented the candidates' support. Ten of these delegates were designated as at-large, meaning that they represent the entire state as a whole. The other six were referred to as Party Leaders and Elected Officials (PLEO). These may include members of the Democratic National Committee (DNC), members of the U.S. House of Representatives and the U.S. Senate, the Governor, and former party leaders. Not all of the PLEOs were pledged, but if they were, they would represent the state as a whole along with the at-large delegates. In total, the Democratic presidential candidates were allocated a total of 45 pledged delegates, depending on their support in each district and in the state.

Twelve delegates that did not represent caucus results were sent to the Democratic National Convention; they are referred to as unpledged. Eleven of them are PLEOs, which include six members of the DNC, one U.S. Senator, three U.S. Representatives, and one Governor. Because these unpledged delegates' profiles are usually high-profile elected officials, they are referred to as superdelegates. The other unpledged delegate is an add-on delegate, who is selected at the Iowa Democratic Party State Convention.

While this process lasts for a period of approximately five months, the results of the state caucus are usually predictable by the results of the precincts' caucuses combined. Therefore, the results of the precinct caucuses provide a good measurement of Iowa's delegation to the Democratic National Convention.

==== Polls ====
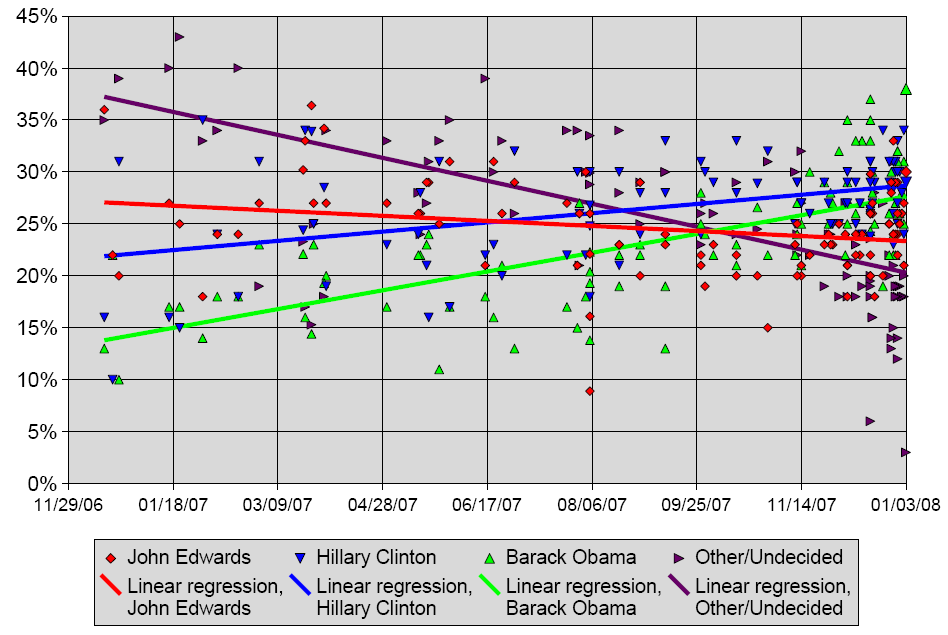
Pre-caucus opinion polling statistics throughout the campaign season.

Before the caucuses, the Des Moines Register reported that during a poll of 800 likely Democratic caucus goers from December 27 to December 30, 2007, the candidates had the following results:

- Barack Obama – 32%
- Hillary Clinton – 25%
- John Edwards – 24%
- Bill Richardson – 6%
- Joe Biden – 4%
- Christopher Dodd – 2%
- Dennis Kucinich – 1%
- Mike Gravel – 0%
- Not sure/Uncommitted – 6%

The above results have a margin of sampling error of ±3.5 percentage points.

Barack Obama's results in the opinion polls rose from 28% in the Des Moines Register's poll in late November 2007. This was in part a result of a "dramatic influx of first-time caucusgoers, including a sizable bloc of political independents." Hillary Rodham Clinton remained at a constant 25%, while John Edwards was almost unchanged when his ratings increased to 24% from 23% in November. Approximately one-third of likely caucusgoers said that they could have been persuaded to choose a different candidate before the caucuses.

The December results of the Des Moines Register's poll also showed a widened gap between the three-way contest for the lead — Clinton, Edwards, and Obama — and the rest of the Democratic candidates. No other Democrat received more than 6 percent support of caucusgoers.

Thirty percent of the sample population from the Des Moines Register's poll said that a candidate's ability to bring about change in the United States was the most important to them; 27% said that a candidate who would be most successful in unifying the country would have taken priority in their votes. Most caucusgoers also said that Obama was strong in both of these areas. Having the experience and competence to lead was considered the most important aspect of a candidate by 18 percent of the sample population; Hillary Clinton was rated best on this trait. Only 6 percent of the sample population said that being best able to win the general election was the top priority; Clinton, again, was rated best on this trait.

==== Results ====
===== Caucus results =====
Iowa Democratic presidential caucuses Barack Obama John Edwards Hillary Clinton Tie

Caucus Date: January 3, 2008

National Pledged Delegates Determined: 0 (of 45)

Iowa Democratic Presidential Caucus Results – 2008
| Party | Candidate | State Delegates | Percentage | Delegates |
|---|---|---|---|---|
| Democratic | Barack Obama | 940 | 37.6% | 16 |
| Democratic | John Edwards | 744 | 29.7% | 14 |
| Democratic | Hillary Clinton | 737 | 29.4% | 15 |
| Democratic | Bill Richardson | 53 | 2.1% | 0 |
| Democratic | Joe Biden | 23 | 0.9% | 0 |
| Democratic | Uncommitted | 3 | 0.2% | 0 |
| Democratic | Christopher Dodd | 1 | 0.0% | 0 |
| Totals | | 2,500 | 100.00% | 45 |
| Voter turnout | | % | | — |

The Iowa Democratic Party does not release vote counts (it releases only the number of delegates to the state convention). Since Hillary Rodham Clinton had the highest delegate strength in Iowa's 5th congressional district (a district allocated four national convention delegates) and received the same amount of national delegates elsewhere, she was projected to receive one more national delegate than Edwards despite receiving fewer projected delegates to the state convention.

The Democratic National Committee gives the 50 states 794 superdelegates. According to a January 4, 2008 poll conducted by the Associated Press, most of the superdelegates were undecided, but 160 had endorsed Clinton, compared to 59 for Obama and 32 for Edwards. Along with the delegates that the candidates secured from Iowa, the numbers were as follows: 175 for Clinton, 75 for Obama, and 46 for Edwards. (To win the Democratic nomination for president, 2,025 delegates are needed.) Thus, Clinton initially retained an overall delegate lead following the Iowa results.

Dennis Kucinich and Barack Obama competed against each other in the Iowa Caucuses, but Kucinich asked that Iowans caucusing for him, should they fail to build a viable preference group on Caucus Night to realign to Barack Obama in the second round. Both had fought for the same priorities including ending the Iraq War, reforming Washington, D.C., and creating a better life for working families. In the 2004 Iowa Democratic Caucuses, Kucinich made a similar announcement in favor of John Edwards. At that caucus, Edwards's aides claimed that this request helped put him in second place. In the 2008 Iowa Caucus, however, Kucinich did not conduct much of a campaign in Iowa. He paid for no organizers nor offices in the state, and he was not invited to the Des Moines Register's debate in December 2007. Mike Gravel didn't conduct an active campaign in Iowa either.

While the 2008 Iowa Caucuses saw a record turnout for both parties, the Democratic caucus drew more than 239,000 voters, almost double the Republican total. Entrance polling indicated that a significant portion of the turnout came from first-time caucus attendees, as well as attendees under the age of 30; two groups of voters that primarily lent their support to Barack Obama. Women, previously expected to largely back Hillary Clinton, split their vote between Clinton and Obama, the latter of whom actually received slightly more support. In the aftermath of the results from the Iowa Caucuses, Chris Dodd and Joe Biden dropped out of the presidential race.

As a result of the Iowa Caucus, Barack Obama received a significant surge of support in the next competition, the New Hampshire Democratic Primary five days after. In New Hampshire pre-primary polls conducted from January 4 to January 6, 2008, Obama enjoyed a 13-point lead over Clinton.

===== County convention results =====
Convention Date: March 15, 2008

National Pledged Delegates Determined: 0 (of 45)

Iowa Democratic Presidential County Convention Results – 2008
| Party | Candidate | County Delegates | Percentage | National Delegates |
|---|---|---|---|---|
| Democratic | Barack Obama | 1,299 | 51.96% | 25 |
| Democratic | Hillary Clinton | 802 | 32.08% | 14 |
| Democratic | John Edwards | 388 | 15.52% | 6 |
| Democratic | Uncommitted | 11 | 0.42% | 0 |
| Totals | | 2,500 | 100.00% | 45 |
| Voter turnout | | % | | — |

===== District convention results =====
Convention Date: April 26, 2008

National pledged delegates determined: 29 (of 45)

Iowa Democratic Presidential District Convention Results – 2008
| Party | Candidate | District Delegates | Percentage | District Delegates | National Delegates |
|---|---|---|---|---|---|
| Democratic | Barack Obama | 16 | 55.17% | 20 | 28 |
| Democratic | Hillary Clinton | 9 | 31.03% | 9 | 14 |
| Democratic | John Edwards | 4 | 13.79% | 0 | 3 |
| Totals | | 29 | 100.00% | 29 | 45 |
| Voter turnout | | | % | | — |

==== Analysis ====
Barack Obama scored a major victory in the Iowa Democratic Caucuses due to a number of factors. According to exit polls, 93 percent of voters in the Iowa Democratic Caucus were Caucasian and 33% voted for Obama, 27 percent for Clinton, and 24 percent for Edwards; 4% of voters were African American and 72% voted for Obama, 16% for Clinton, and 8% for Edwards; 3% represented other races and they went 49% for Obama, 26% for Clinton, 10% for Richardson, and 5% for Edwards. Obama also won young voters ages 17–44 with 52% of the vote compared to 16% for both Clinton and Edwards. Edwards won middle-age voters ages 45–59 with 30% while Obama received 29% and Clinton took in 26% of their support. Clinton did best among elderly voters ages 60 and over with 40% of the vote while Edwards received 27% and Obama took in 19.5% of their support. Obama won self-identified Democrats by a margin of 32-31-23 (Obama-Clinton-Edwards), Independents backed Obama 41-23-17 (Obama-Edwards-Clinton), as well as self-identified Republicans who supported Obama 44-32-10 (Obama-Edwards-Clinton). Obama also won moderates and liberals but Edwards won conservatives. Socioeconomic class was not really a factor in how voters made their decisions, as Obama won all groups of family incomes.

Obama performed best in Eastern Iowa, which is considered to be the more liberal part of the state, and Central Iowa which is considered to be the more moderate part of the state. Clinton performed best in Western Iowa, which is considered to be the most conservative part of the state.

=== Republican caucuses ===
Prior to the 2008 caucuses, as in previous election cycles with a competitive presidential race, an unofficial Ames Straw Poll was held, on August 11, 2007. The official one, electing delegates to the state convention, was held on January 3, 2008, the same day as the Democratic contest. In the Ames Straw Poll, Mitt Romney finished first with 32% of the vote. In the January 2008 caucuses, Mike Huckabee finished first with 34% of the vote.

==== Process ====
Unlike the Democratic caucus, the Republican Party does not use voting rounds or have minimum requirements for a percent of votes. The Republican version is done with a straw vote of those attending the caucus. This vote is sometimes done by a show of hands or by dividing themselves into groups according to candidate. However, officially it is done with voters receiving a blank piece of paper with no names on it, and the voter writing a name and placing it in a ballot box.

Following the straw poll, delegates are then elected from the remaining participants in the room, as most voters leave once their vote is cast. All delegates are officially considered unbound, but media outlets either apportion delegates proportionally or apportion them in terms of winner-take-all by counties. In precincts that elect only one delegate, the delegate is chosen by majority vote and the vote must be by paper ballot. The state party strongly urges that delegates reflect the results of the preference poll, but there is no obligation that they do so.

==== The Ames Straw Poll ====
The 2007 Ames straw poll was held at Iowa State University (Ames)'s Hilton Coliseum on August 11, 2007. This was primarily a fundraising event for the state's Republican Party, and only Iowa residents who paid the $35 price for a ticket were eligible to vote. Tickets were available through the various presidential campaigns and the Iowa Republican Party's headquarters.

In general, the candidates bought large blocks of tickets and gave them out for free to whoever agreed to go and vote for that candidate. The candidates also rented buses to transport voters to Ames.

Mitt Romney finished first with 32% of the vote, followed by Mike Huckabee (18%), Sam Brownback (15%), Tom Tancredo (14%), and Ron Paul (10%). Six other candidates shared the remaining 14% of the vote.

==== Pre-caucus polls ====
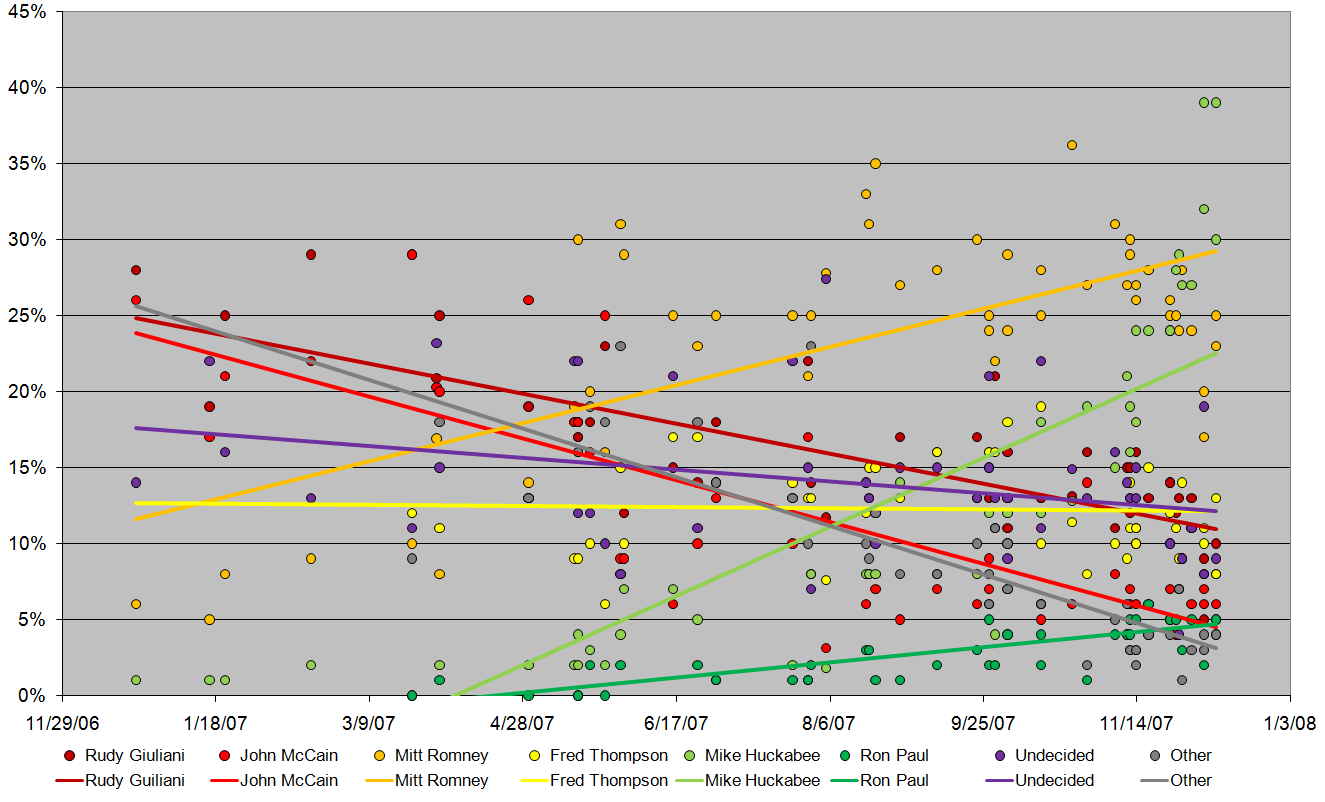
Pre-caucus opinion polling statistics throughout the campaign season.

Before the caucuses, the Des Moines Register reported the following results from a poll of 800 likely Republican caucus goers from December 27 to December 30, 2007:

- Mike Huckabee – 32%
- Mitt Romney – 26%
- John McCain – 13%
- Fred Thompson – 9%
- Ron Paul – 9%
- Rudy Giuliani – 5%
- Duncan Hunter – 1%
- Alan Keyes – 1%
- Not sure/Uncommitted – 4%

The above results have a margin of sampling error of ±3.5 percentage points.

Mike Huckabee's results in the opinion polls rose from 29% in the Des Moines Register's poll in late November 2007. Mitt Romney rose two points from 24% in November to 26% in December. John McCain enjoyed the biggest increase from November, increasing six points from 7% to 13%, while Rudy Giuliani suffered the biggest drop from November, decreasing eight points from 13% to 5%. Giuliani's large drop was attributed to his strategy of skipping early states such as Iowa and New Hampshire in favor of larger, delegate-rich states such as Florida, California, and New York. No other candidate polled more than 10%.

Huckabee's poll numbers in Iowa rose dramatically from October to December, in part due to his backing among evangelical voters, who accounted for almost one-half of those polled. Huckabee led Romney in that group 47%-20%. Huckabee also polled higher than Romney among the group who said it was more important to be a social conservative than a fiscal conservative, while Romney led Huckabee 29%-25% among the group who said that being fiscally conservative was most important. In addition, Romney also polled highest in the categories of experience and competence, the ability to bring about change, and electability.

==== Results ====
As of 11:05 p.m. EDT, January 3, 2008, with 100% of the votes reported, the results were:

100% of precincts reporting
| Candidate | Votes | Percentage | Delegates |
|---|---|---|---|
| Mike Huckabee | 40,954 | 34.36% | 17 |
| Mitt Romney | 30,021 | 25.19% | 12 |
| Fred Thompson | 15,960 | 13.39% | 0 |
| John McCain | 15,536 | 13.03% | 3 |
| Ron Paul | 11,841 | 9.93% | 2 |
| Rudy Giuliani | 4,099 | 3.44% | 0 |
| Duncan Hunter | 506 | 0.42% | 0 |
| Alan Keyes | 247 | 0.21% | 0 |
| John Cox* | 10 | .01% | 0 |
| Hugh Cort | 5 | 0% | 0 |
| Tom Tancredo* | 5 | 0% | 0 |
| Vern Wuensche | 2 | 0% | 0 |
| Sam Brownback* | 1 | 0% | 0 |
| Cap Fendig | 1 | 0% | 0 |
| Total | 119,188 | 100% | 34 |

*Candidate had already dropped out of the race prior to caucus.

Only three candidates won majorities in the individual counties: Mike Huckabee, Mitt Romney, and Ron Paul. The Giuliani campaign followed an unusual strategy of focusing on larger states that vote later in the process, and had done little if any campaigning in Iowa. Tancredo had already withdrawn from the presidential race two weeks earlier and endorsed Romney, but his name remained in the official list of candidates of the Iowa Republican Party.

Some 120,000 Iowa Republicans attended the 2008 caucuses, a new record. About 87,000 attended in 2000; in 2004, George W. Bush ran unopposed.

== General election ==
=== Predictions ===
There were 16 organizations or websites that made state-by-state predictions of the election. Here are their last predictions before election day:

| Source | Ranking |
|---|---|
| D.C. Political Report | Likely D (flip) |
| Cook Political Report | Lean D (flip) |
| The Takeaway | Lean D (flip) |
| Electoral-vote.com | Solid D (flip) |
| Washington Post | Solid D (flip) |
| Politico | Solid D (flip) |
| RealClearPolitics | Solid D (flip) |
| FiveThirtyEight | Solid D (flip) |
| CQ Politics | Solid D (flip) |
| The New York Times | Lean D (flip) |
| CNN | Safe D (flip) |
| NPR | Solid D (flip) |
| MSNBC | Lean D (flip) |
| Fox News | Likely D (flip) |
| Associated Press | Likely D (flip) |
| Rasmussen Reports | Safe D (flip) |

=== Polling ===
Obama won every pre-election poll but one taken in the state. The final 3 polls averaged Obama leading 54% to 39%.

=== Fundraising ===
John McCain raised a total of $680,641 in the state. Barack Obama raised $2,250,696.

=== Advertising and visits ===
Obama and his interest groups spent $15,334,065. McCain and his interest groups spent $5,817,988. The Republican ticket visited the state 9 times. The Democratic ticket visited the state 4 times.

== Analysis ==
Despite its closeness in recent elections, Iowa was not in close contention in the 2008 election. During primary season, Barack Obama had campaigned extensively in the state and won a substantial victory that established him as the Democratic front-runner and ultimately propelled him to victory over Hillary Clinton. In contrast, John McCain did not campaign at all in Iowa and ended up placing fourth in the Iowa Republican Caucus. Moreover, McCain's stand against congressional ethanol subsidies proved unpopular in a state with a large corn crop; conversely, Obama supported these subsidies. Polls consistently gave Barack Obama a double-digit lead in the state.

On Election Day, Obama won by a 9.54-point margin. The reliably Republican western part of the state turned out for McCain as expected. John Kerry failed to win any counties in this region in 2004, contributing substantially to Bush's narrow victory in the state. However, Obama significantly improved on Kerry's performance in the region. For instance, Pottawattamie County, home to Council Bluffs, went from an 18-point win for Bush to only a two-point win for McCain. Conversely, in traditionally Democratic Eastern Iowa, Obama did historically well. He was already familiar to many voters in the region, in part because the Quad Cities area spills into Obama's home state of Illinois. He also did very well in typically competitive central Iowa, anchored by the state capital of Des Moines. Every county in the state, except Clarke in central Iowa, voted more Democratic in 2008 than in 2004.

At the same time, incumbent Democratic U.S. Senator Tom Harkin was reelected with 62.66% of the vote over Republican Christopher Reed, a businessman, who received 37.26%. At the state level, Democrats expanded their leads in the Iowa state legislature, picking up four seats in the Iowa House of Representatives and two seats in the Iowa Senate.

== Results ==
2008 United States presidential election in Iowa
| Party | Candidate | Votes | Percentage | Electoral votes |
|---|---|---|---|---|
| Democratic | Barack Obama | 828,940 | 53.93% | 7 |
| Republican | John McCain | 682,379 | 44.39% | 0 |
| Peace and Freedom | Ralph Nader | 8,014 | 0.52% | 0 |
| N/A | Write-ins | 6,737 | 0.44% | 0 |
| Libertarian | Bob Barr | 4,590 | 0.30% | 0 |
| Constitution | Chuck Baldwin | 4,445 | 0.29% | 0 |
| Green | Cynthia McKinney | 1,423 | 0.09% | 0 |
| Socialist Workers | James Harris | 292 | 0.02% | 0 |
| Socialist | Brian Moore | 182 | 0.01% | 0 |
| Party for Socialism and Liberation | Gloria La Riva | 121 | 0.01% | 0 |
| Totals | | 1,544,268 | 100% | 7 |
| Voter Turnout (Voting age/Registered) | | | | 69%/73% |

=== By county ===
| County | Barack Obama Democratic | | John McCain Republican | | Various candidates Other parties | | Margin | | Total votes cast |
| County | # | % | # | % | # | % | # | % | Total votes cast |
|---|---|---|---|---|---|---|---|---|---|
| Adair | 1,924 | 47.47% | 2,060 | 50.83% | 69 | 1.70% | -136 | -3.36% | 4,053 |
| Adams | 1,118 | 50.68% | 1,046 | 47.42% | 42 | 1.91% | 72 | 3.26% | 2,206 |
| Allamakee | 3,971 | 56.23% | 2,965 | 41.99% | 126 | 1.77% | 1,006 | 14.24% | 7,062 |
| Appanoose | 2,970 | 48.07% | 3,086 | 49.94% | 123 | 1.97% | -116 | -1.87% | 6,179 |
| Audubon | 1,739 | 50.61% | 1,634 | 47.56% | 63 | 1.83% | 105 | 3.05% | 3,436 |
| Benton | 7,058 | 51.45% | 6,447 | 47.00% | 212 | 1.54% | 611 | 4.45% | 13,717 |
| Black Hawk | 39,184 | 60.48% | 24,662 | 38.07% | 941 | 1.45% | 14,522 | 22.41% | 64,787 |
| Boone | 7,356 | 52.80% | 6,293 | 45.17% | 282 | 2.02% | 1,063 | 7.63% | 13,931 |
| Bremer | 6,940 | 53.92% | 5,741 | 44.60% | 191 | 1.48% | 1,199 | 9.32% | 12,872 |
| Buchanan | 6,050 | 58.50% | 4,139 | 40.02% | 153 | 1.48% | 1,911 | 18.48% | 10,342 |
| Buena Vista | 4,075 | 48.40% | 4,223 | 50.15% | 122 | 1.45% | -148 | -1.75% | 8,420 |
| Butler | 3,364 | 46.94% | 3,700 | 51.63% | 102 | 1.43% | -336 | -4.69% | 7,166 |
| Calhoun | 2,341 | 45.06% | 2,741 | 52.76% | 113 | 2.18% | -400 | -7.70% | 5,195 |
| Carroll | 5,302 | 51.01% | 4,922 | 47.35% | 171 | 1.65% | 380 | 3.66% | 10,395 |
| Cass | 3,211 | 43.68% | 4,006 | 54.49% | 135 | 1.83% | -795 | -10.81% | 7,352 |
| Cedar | 5,221 | 54.02% | 4,289 | 44.38% | 155 | 1.60% | 932 | 9.64% | 9,665 |
| Cerro Gordo | 14,405 | 59.67% | 9,375 | 38.83% | 363 | 1.50% | 5,030 | 20.84% | 24,143 |
| Cherokee | 2,890 | 45.38% | 3,372 | 52.95% | 106 | 1.67% | -482 | -7.57% | 6,368 |
| Chickasaw | 3,923 | 59.57% | 2,557 | 38.82% | 106 | 1.61% | 1,366 | 20.75% | 6,586 |
| Clarke | 2,218 | 49.90% | 2,118 | 47.65% | 109 | 2.44% | 100 | 2.25% | 4,445 |
| Clay | 3,925 | 46.72% | 4,355 | 51.83% | 122 | 1.45% | -430 | -5.11% | 8,402 |
| Clayton | 5,195 | 57.79% | 3,651 | 40.61% | 144 | 1.61% | 1,544 | 17.18% | 8,990 |
| Clinton | 15,018 | 60.75% | 9,324 | 37.72% | 380 | 1.54% | 5,694 | 23.03% | 24,722 |
| Crawford | 3,715 | 51.66% | 3,345 | 46.52% | 131 | 1.82% | 370 | 5.14% | 7,191 |
| Dallas | 15,149 | 46.41% | 16,954 | 51.94% | 540 | 1.65% | -1,805 | -5.53% | 32,643 |
| Davis | 1,680 | 44.00% | 2,029 | 53.14% | 109 | 2.85% | -349 | -9.14% | 3,818 |
| Decatur | 1,986 | 48.37% | 2,020 | 49.20% | 100 | 2.43% | -34 | -0.83% | 4,106 |
| Delaware | 4,649 | 52.22% | 4,113 | 46.20% | 141 | 1.58% | 536 | 6.02% | 8,903 |
| Des Moines | 12,462 | 60.57% | 7,721 | 37.53% | 391 | 1.90% | 4,741 | 23.04% | 20,574 |
| Dickinson | 4,625 | 46.68% | 5,162 | 52.10% | 120 | 1.20% | -537 | -5.42% | 9,907 |
| Dubuque | 28,611 | 59.65% | 18,651 | 38.89% | 701 | 1.46% | 9,960 | 20.76% | 47,963 |
| Emmet | 2,570 | 51.25% | 2,373 | 47.32% | 72 | 1.44% | 197 | 3.93% | 5,015 |
| Fayette | 5,908 | 57.57% | 4,205 | 40.98% | 149 | 1.45% | 1,703 | 16.59% | 10,262 |
| Floyd | 4,822 | 59.58% | 3,051 | 37.70% | 219 | 2.71% | 1,771 | 21.88% | 8,093 |
| Franklin | 2,575 | 50.01% | 2,501 | 48.57% | 73 | 1.42% | 74 | 1.44% | 5,149 |
| Fremont | 1,848 | 47.43% | 1,989 | 51.05% | 59 | 1.52% | -141 | -3.62% | 3,896 |
| Greene | 2,371 | 49.35% | 2,349 | 48.90% | 84 | 1.74% | 22 | 0.45% | 4,804 |
| Grundy | 2,790 | 40.86% | 3,945 | 57.77% | 94 | 1.37% | -1,155 | -16.91% | 6,829 |
| Guthrie | 2,625 | 44.88% | 3,074 | 52.56% | 150 | 2.57% | -449 | -7.68% | 5,849 |
| Hamilton | 4,018 | 49.72% | 3,913 | 48.42% | 150 | 1.86% | 105 | 1.30% | 8,081 |
| Hancock | 2,805 | 47.30% | 3,016 | 50.86% | 109 | 1.85% | -211 | -3.56% | 5,930 |
| Hardin | 4,393 | 49.58% | 4,315 | 48.70% | 153 | 1.73% | 78 | 0.88% | 8,861 |
| Harrison | 3,555 | 46.88% | 3,909 | 51.55% | 119 | 1.57% | -354 | -4.67% | 7,583 |
| Henry | 4,349 | 46.36% | 4,822 | 51.41% | 209 | 2.22% | -473 | -5.05% | 9,380 |
| Howard | 2,941 | 62.19% | 1,722 | 36.41% | 66 | 1.40% | 1,219 | 25.78% | 4,729 |
| Humboldt | 2,160 | 42.16% | 2,895 | 56.51% | 68 | 1.32% | -735 | -14.35% | 5,123 |
| Ida | 1,454 | 40.99% | 2,036 | 57.40% | 57 | 1.61% | -582 | -16.41% | 3,547 |
| Iowa | 4,202 | 49.16% | 4,188 | 48.99% | 158 | 1.85% | 14 | 0.17% | 8,548 |
| Jackson | 6,102 | 61.28% | 3,673 | 36.89% | 182 | 1.82% | 2,429 | 24.39% | 9,957 |
| Jasper | 10,250 | 52.78% | 8,794 | 45.28% | 378 | 1.95% | 1,456 | 7.50% | 19,422 |
| Jefferson | 5,070 | 58.73% | 3,324 | 38.51% | 238 | 2.76% | 1,746 | 20.22% | 8,632 |
| Johnson | 51,027 | 69.91% | 20,732 | 28.40% | 1,230 | 1.69% | 30,295 | 41.51% | 72,989 |
| Jones | 5,446 | 54.42% | 4,405 | 44.01% | 157 | 1.57% | 1,041 | 10.41% | 10,008 |
| Keokuk | 2,518 | 46.96% | 2,712 | 50.58% | 132 | 2.46% | -194 | -3.62% | 5,362 |
| Kossuth | 4,625 | 50.82% | 4,329 | 47.57% | 146 | 1.60% | 296 | 3.25% | 9,100 |
| Lee | 9,821 | 57.00% | 7,062 | 40.99% | 347 | 2.01% | 2,759 | 16.01% | 17,230 |
| Linn | 68,037 | 60.01% | 43,626 | 38.48% | 1,706 | 1.50% | 24,411 | 21.53% | 113,369 |
| Louisa | 2,523 | 51.27% | 2,314 | 47.02% | 84 | 1.71% | 209 | 4.25% | 4,921 |
| Lucas | 2,029 | 45.33% | 2,330 | 52.06% | 117 | 2.61% | -301 | -6.73% | 4,476 |
| Lyon | 1,675 | 26.93% | 4,471 | 71.88% | 74 | 1.19% | -2,796 | -44.95% | 6,220 |
| Madison | 3,733 | 44.02% | 4,579 | 53.99% | 169 | 1.99% | -846 | -9.97% | 8,481 |
| Mahaska | 4,464 | 40.83% | 6,271 | 57.35% | 199 | 1.82% | -1,807 | -16.52% | 10,934 |
| Marion | 7,421 | 43.57% | 9,256 | 54.34% | 355 | 2.09% | -1,835 | -10.77% | 17,032 |
| Marshall | 10,023 | 53.71% | 8,278 | 44.36% | 362 | 1.93% | 1,745 | 9.35% | 18,663 |
| Mills | 2,976 | 40.86% | 4,183 | 57.44% | 124 | 1.70% | -1,207 | -16.58% | 7,283 |
| Mitchell | 3,179 | 55.13% | 2,469 | 42.82% | 118 | 2.05% | 710 | 12.31% | 5,766 |
| Monona | 2,295 | 47.84% | 2,411 | 50.26% | 91 | 1.90% | -116 | -2.42% | 4,797 |
| Monroe | 1,798 | 46.41% | 2,000 | 51.63% | 76 | 1.96% | -202 | -5.22% | 3,874 |
| Montgomery | 2,326 | 43.98% | 2,887 | 54.58% | 76 | 1.44% | -561 | -10.60% | 5,289 |
| Muscatine | 10,920 | 57.11% | 7,929 | 41.47% | 271 | 1.42% | 2,991 | 15.64% | 19,120 |
| O'Brien | 2,338 | 31.88% | 4,894 | 66.74% | 101 | 1.38% | -2,556 | -34.86% | 7,333 |
| Osceola | 1,037 | 33.14% | 2,027 | 64.78% | 65 | 2.08% | -990 | -31.64% | 3,129 |
| Page | 2,900 | 39.41% | 4,351 | 59.12% | 108 | 1.47% | -1,451 | -19.71% | 7,359 |
| Palo Alto | 2,428 | 50.50% | 2,294 | 47.71% | 86 | 1.79% | 134 | 2.79% | 4,808 |
| Plymouth | 4,629 | 36.99% | 7,765 | 62.05% | 121 | 0.96% | -3,136 | -25.06% | 12,515 |
| Pocahontas | 1,800 | 44.87% | 2,138 | 53.29% | 74 | 1.84% | -338 | -8.42% | 4,012 |
| Polk | 120,984 | 56.43% | 89,668 | 41.82% | 3,757 | 1.75% | 31,316 | 14.61% | 214,409 |
| Pottawattamie | 20,436 | 48.28% | 21,237 | 50.18% | 651 | 1.54% | -801 | -1.90% | 42,324 |
| Poweshiek | 5,519 | 55.01% | 4,340 | 43.26% | 174 | 1.73% | 1,179 | 11.75% | 10,033 |
| Ringgold | 1,236 | 45.97% | 1,401 | 52.10% | 52 | 1.93% | -165 | -6.13% | 2,689 |
| Sac | 2,256 | 44.65% | 2,705 | 53.53% | 92 | 1.82% | -449 | -8.88% | 5,053 |
| Scott | 48,927 | 56.64% | 36,365 | 42.10% | 1,086 | 1.26% | 12,562 | 14.54% | 86,378 |
| Shelby | 2,863 | 44.35% | 3,488 | 54.04% | 104 | 1.61% | -625 | -9.69% | 6,455 |
| Sioux | 3,030 | 18.18% | 13,490 | 80.95% | 145 | 0.87% | -10,460 | -62.77% | 16,665 |
| Story | 26,548 | 56.99% | 18,995 | 40.78% | 1,038 | 2.23% | 7,553 | 16.21% | 46,581 |
| Tama | 4,899 | 55.34% | 3,820 | 43.15% | 133 | 1.51% | 1,079 | 12.19% | 8,852 |
| Taylor | 1,347 | 44.51% | 1,607 | 53.11% | 72 | 2.38% | -260 | -8.60% | 3,026 |
| Union | 3,000 | 50.73% | 2,781 | 47.02% | 133 | 2.25% | 219 | 3.71% | 5,914 |
| Van Buren | 1,546 | 42.80% | 1,986 | 54.98% | 80 | 2.21% | -440 | -12.18% | 3,612 |
| Wapello | 8,820 | 55.33% | 6,663 | 41.80% | 457 | 2.87% | 2,157 | 13.53% | 15,940 |
| Warren | 12,299 | 49.42% | 12,144 | 48.79% | 446 | 1.79% | 155 | 0.63% | 24,889 |
| Washington | 5,170 | 48.64% | 5,247 | 49.36% | 212 | 2.00% | -77 | -0.72% | 10,629 |
| Wayne | 1,357 | 45.52% | 1,565 | 52.50% | 59 | 1.98% | -208 | -6.98% | 2,981 |
| Webster | 9,917 | 53.44% | 8,337 | 44.93% | 302 | 1.63% | 1,580 | 8.51% | 18,556 |
| Winnebago | 3,254 | 53.48% | 2,730 | 44.86% | 101 | 1.66% | 524 | 8.62% | 6,085 |
| Winneshiek | 6,829 | 60.52% | 4,273 | 37.87% | 182 | 1.61% | 2,556 | 22.65% | 11,284 |
| Woodbury | 21,983 | 49.05% | 22,219 | 49.58% | 613 | 1.37% | -236 | -0.53% | 44,815 |
| Worth | 2,567 | 60.27% | 1,612 | 37.85% | 80 | 1.88% | 955 | 22.42% | 4,259 |
| Wright | 3,102 | 48.51% | 3,198 | 50.01% | 95 | 1.48% | -96 | -1.50% | 6,395 |
| Total | 828,940 | 53.93% | 682,379 | 44.39% | 25,804 | 1.68% | 146,561 | 9.54% | 1,537,123 |

==== Counties that flipped from Republican to Democratic ====
- Adams (largest city: Corning)
- Audubon (largest city: Audubon)
- Allamakee (largest city: Waukon)
- Bremer (largest city: Waverly)
- Carroll (largest city: Carroll)
- Cedar (largest city: Tipton)
- Crawford (largest city: Denison)
- Delaware (largest city: Manchester)
- Emmet (largest city: Estherville)
- Franklin (largest city: Hampton)
- Greene (largest city: Jefferson)
- Hamilton (largest city: Webster City)
- Hardin (largest city: Iowa Falls)
- Iowa (largest city: Williamsburg)
- Kossuth (largest city: Algona)
- Louisa (largest city: Wapello)
- Marshall (largest city: Marshalltown)
- Palo Alto (largest city: Emmetsburg)
- Union (largest city: Creston)
- Warren (largest city: Indianola)
- Winnebago (largest city: Forest City)

=== By congressional district ===
Barack Obama carried four out of the state's five congressional districts, including one district held by a Republican.

| District | McCain | Obama | Representative |
|---|---|---|---|
| 1st | 40.72% | 58.24% | Bruce Braley |
| 2nd | 38.57% | 60.18% | Dave Loebsack |
| 3rd | 44.66% | 54.03% | Leonard Boswell |
| 4th | 45.53% | 53.11% | Tom Latham |
| 5th | 54.60% | 44.25% | Steve King |

== Electors ==
Technically the voters of Iowa cast their ballots for electors: representatives to the Electoral College. Iowa is allocated 7 electors because it has 5 congressional districts and 2 senators. All candidates who appear on the ballot or qualify to receive write-in votes must submit a list of 7 electors, who pledge to vote for their candidate and his or her running mate. Whoever wins the majority of votes in the state is awarded all 7 electoral votes. Their chosen electors then vote for president and vice president. Although electors are pledged to their candidate and running mate, they are not obligated to vote for them. An elector who votes for someone other than his or her candidate is known as a faithless elector.

The electors of each state and the District of Columbia met on December 15, 2008, to cast their votes for president and vice president. The Electoral College itself never meets as one body. Instead the electors from each state and the District of Columbia met in their respective capitols.

The following were the members of the Electoral College from the state. All 7 pledged to Barack Obama and Joe Biden:

1. Elwood Thompson
2. Slayton Thompson
3. Kathleen O'Leary
4. Jon Heitland
5. Dennis Ryan
6. Joe Judge
7. Audrey Linville

== See also ==
- United States presidential elections in Iowa
- 2008 Democratic Party presidential primaries
- 2008 Republican Party presidential primaries
