= Delaware County, New York =

County in New York, United States

- County
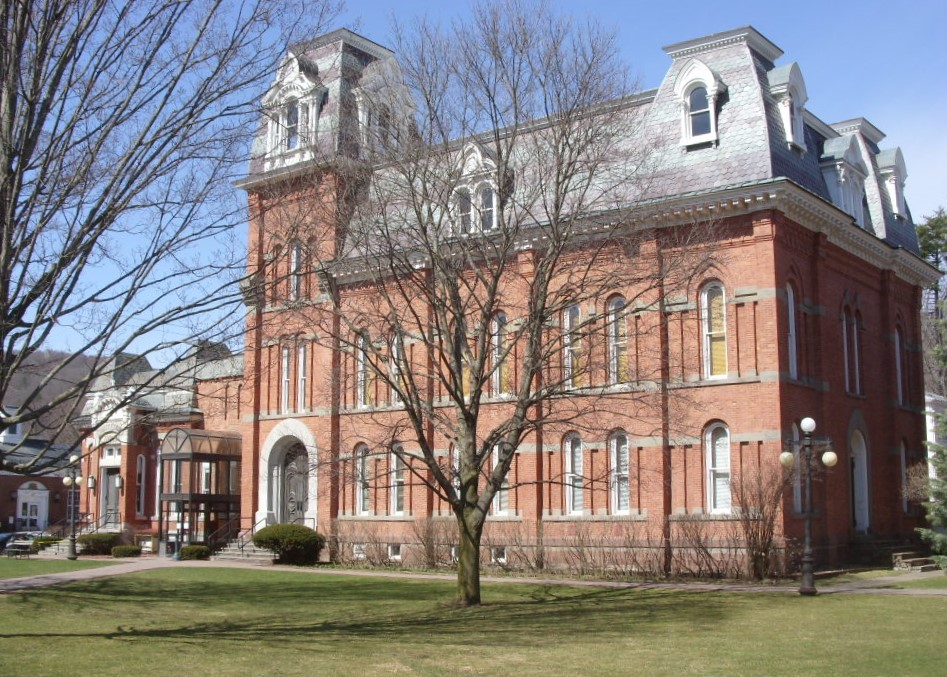
- Delaware County Courthouse

- Flag Seal

- Location within the U.S. state of New York
- Coordinates: 42°12′N 74°58′W
- Country: United States
- State: New York
- Founded: 1797
- Named for: Delaware River
- Seat: Delhi
- Largest village: Sidney

Area
  - Total: 1,467 sq mi (3,800 km^{2})
  - Land: 1,442 sq mi (3,730 km^{2})
  - Water: 25 sq mi (65 km^{2}) 1.7%

Population (2020)
  - Total: 44,308
  - Estimate (2025): 44,305
  - Density: 30.7/sq mi (11.9/km^{2})
- Time zone: UTC−5 (Eastern)
  - Summer (DST): UTC−4 (EDT)
- Congressional district: 19th
- Website: delcony.us

Delaware County is a county located in the US state of New York. As of the 2020 United States census, the population was 44,308. The county seat is Delhi. The county is named after the Delaware River, which was named in honor of Thomas West, 3rd Baron De La Warr, appointed governor of Virginia in 1609. The county is part of the Southern Tier region of the state.

== History ==
When counties were established in New York State in 1683, the present area of Delaware County was divided between Albany and Ulster Counties.

Albany County was an enormous county, including the northern part of New York State as well as all of the present State of Vermont and, in theory, extending westward to the Pacific Ocean. This county was reduced in size on July 3, 1766, by the creation of Cumberland County, and further on March 16, 1770, by the creation of Gloucester County, both containing territory now in Vermont. On March 12, 1772, what was left of Albany County was split into three parts, one remaining under the name Albany County. One of the other pieces, Tryon County, contained the western portion (and thus, since no western boundary was specified, theoretically still extended west to the Pacific). The eastern boundary of Tryon County was approximately five miles west of the present city of Schenectady, and the county included the western part of the Adirondack Mountains and the area west of the West Branch of the Delaware River. The area then designated as Tryon County now includes 37 counties of New York State. The county was named for William Tryon, British colonial governor of New York.

In the years prior to 1776, most of the Loyalists in Tryon County fled to Canada. In 1784, following the peace treaty that ended the American Revolutionary War, the name of Tryon County was changed to Montgomery County to honor the general, Richard Montgomery, who had captured several places in Canada and died attempting to capture the city of Quebec, replacing the name of Tryon.

During the late 1780s, New York State governor De Witt Clinton issued land grants to military officers, doctors and other veterans of the American Revolutionary War, which brought many patriot veterans to settle in the area.

In 1789, Montgomery County was reduced in size by the splitting off of Ontario County. The actual area split off from Montgomery County was much larger than the present county, also including the present Allegany, Cattaraugus, Chautauqua, Erie, Genesee, Livingston, Monroe, Niagara, Orleans, Steuben, Wyoming, Yates, and part of Schuyler and Wayne Counties.

In 1791, Otsego was one of three counties that were split off from Montgomery (the other two being Herkimer and Tioga Counties).

Ulster County was an original county of New York State, considerably larger than the present Ulster County, and at the time that Delaware County was created it still contained most of its original area.

Delaware County was formed in 1797 by combining portions of Otsego and Ulster counties.

== Geography ==
According to the U.S. Census Bureau, the county has a total area of 1,467 square miles (3,800 km^{2}), of which 1,442 square miles (3,730 km^{2}) is land and 25 square miles (65 km^{2}) (1.7%) is water. It is the fifth-largest county in New York by land area.

Delaware County is located in the southern part of the state, separated from the state of Pennsylvania by the Delaware River. It is east of Binghamton and southwest of Albany. The county contains part of the Catskill Mountains. The county is within a region called the Southern Tier of New York State.

The highest point is an approximately 3,520-foot (1,070 m) summit of Bearpen Mountain along the Greene County line. The lowest point is along the Delaware River. The county is drained by the headwaters of the Delaware. It has a hilly surface, and the soil in the valleys is exceedingly fertile. The Delaware and Susquehanna rivers are here navigable by boats.

=== Adjacent counties ===
- Otsego County – north
- Schoharie County – northeast
- Greene County – east
- Ulster County – southeast
- Sullivan County – south
- Wayne County, Pennsylvania – southwest
- Broome County – west
- Chenango County – northwest

=== National protected area ===
- Upper Delaware Scenic and Recreational River, (part)

== Demographics ==
Historical population
| Census | Pop. | Note | %± |
|---|---|---|---|
| 1800 | 10,228 | | — |
| 1810 | 20,303 | | 98.5% |
| 1820 | 26,587 | | 31.0% |
| 1830 | 33,024 | | 24.2% |
| 1840 | 35,396 | | 7.2% |
| 1850 | 39,834 | | 12.5% |
| 1860 | 42,465 | | 6.6% |
| 1870 | 42,972 | | 1.2% |
| 1880 | 42,721 | | −0.6% |
| 1890 | 45,496 | | 6.5% |
| 1900 | 46,413 | | 2.0% |
| 1910 | 45,575 | | −1.8% |
| 1920 | 42,774 | | −6.1% |
| 1930 | 41,163 | | −3.8% |
| 1940 | 40,989 | | −0.4% |
| 1950 | 44,420 | | 8.4% |
| 1960 | 43,540 | | −2.0% |
| 1970 | 44,718 | | 2.7% |
| 1980 | 46,824 | | 4.7% |
| 1990 | 47,225 | | 0.9% |
| 2000 | 48,055 | | 1.8% |
| 2010 | 47,980 | | −0.2% |
| 2020 | 44,308 | | −7.7% |
| 2025 (est.) | 44,305 | ▼ | 0.0% |
U.S. Decennial Census; 1790–1960 1900–1990; 1990–2000 2010–2020

|estyear=2023 |estimate=44410 |estref=

=== 2020 census ===
Delaware County, New York – Racial and ethnic composition Note: the US Census treats Hispanic/Latino as an ethnic category. This table excludes Latinos from the racial categories and assigns them to a separate category. Hispanics/Latinos may be of any race.
| Race / Ethnicity (NH = Non-Hispanic) | Pop 1980 | Pop 1990 | Pop 2000 | Pop 2010 | Pop 2020 | % 1980 | % 1990 | % 2000 | % 2010 | % 2020 |
|---|---|---|---|---|---|---|---|---|---|---|
| White alone (NH) | 45,975 | 45,930 | 45,693 | 44,706 | 38,821 | 98.19% | 97.26% | 95.08% | 93.18% | 87.62% |
| Black or African American alone (NH) | 279 | 447 | 529 | 691 | 1,003 | 0.60% | 0.95% | 1.10% | 1.44% | 2.26% |
| Native American or Alaska Native alone (NH) | 88 | 111 | 134 | 102 | 93 | 0.19% | 0.24% | 0.28% | 0.21% | 0.21% |
| Asian alone (NH) | 124 | 183 | 253 | 363 | 480 | 0.26% | 0.39% | 0.53% | 0.76% | 1.08% |
| Native Hawaiian or Pacific Islander alone (NH) | x | x | 6 | 6 | 7 | x | x | 0.01% | 0.01% | 0.02% |
| Other race alone (NH) | 65 | 18 | 42 | 31 | 154 | 0.14% | 0.04% | 0.09% | 0.06% | 0.35% |
| Mixed race or Multiracial (NH) | x | x | 415 | 521 | 1,765 | x | x | 0.86% | 1.09% | 3.98% |
| Hispanic or Latino (any race) | 293 | 536 | 983 | 1,560 | 1,985 | 0.63% | 1.13% | 2.05% | 3.25% | 4.48% |
| Total | 46,824 | 47,225 | 48,055 | 47,980 | 44,308 | 100.00% | 100.00% | 100.00% | 100.00% | 100.00% |

=== 2000 census ===
As of the census of 2000, there were 48,055 people, 19,270 households, and 12,737 families residing in the county. The population density was 13 people per square mile (5.0 people/km^{2}), making it the least densely populated in the state outside the Adirondacks. There were 28,952 housing units at an average density of 20 units per square mile (7.7/km^{2}). The racial makeup of the county was 96.44% White, 1.18% Black or African American, 0.31% Native American, 0.53% Asian, 0.01% Pacific Islander, 0.53% from other races, and 0.99% from two or more races. 2.05% of the population were Hispanic or Latino of any race. 23.9% were of English ancestry, 16.9% were of German ancestry and 14.1% were of Irish ancestry according to the 2012 Community Survey. 94.5% spoke English, 2.0% Spanish and 1.1% German as their first language.

There were 19,270 households, out of which 28.10% had children under the age of 18 living with them, 52.80% were married couples living together, 9.00% had a female householder with no husband present, and 33.90% were non-families. 28.30% of all households were made up of individuals, and 13.60% had someone living alone who was 65 years of age or older. The average household size was 2.39 and the average family size was 2.90.

In the county, the population was spread out, with 23.10% under the age of 18, 8.20% from 18 to 24, 24.00% from 25 to 44, 26.20% from 45 to 64, and 18.60% who were 65 years of age or older. The median age was 41 years. For every 100 females there were 97.00 males. For every 100 females age 18 and over, there were 93.80 males.

The median income for a household in the county was $32,461, and the median income for a family was $39,695. Males had a median income of $27,732 versus $22,262 for females. The per capita income for the county was $17,357. About 9.30% of families and 12.90% of the population were below the poverty line, including 18.60% of those under age 18 and 8.60% of those age 65 or over.

== Education ==
The State University of New York at Delhi is located in Delaware County. DCMO BOCES (Delaware-Chenango-Madison-Otsego; Board of Cooperative Educational Services) – Robert W. Harrold Campus is located in Sidney Center.

== Transportation ==
Delaware County has some transportation operated by Coach USA.

=== Major highways ===
- Future Interstate 86/New York State Route 17 (Quickway)
- Interstate 88 (Senator Warren M. Anderson Expressway / Susquehanna Expressway)
- New York State Route 8
- New York State Route 10
- New York State Route 23
- New York State Route 28
- New York State Route 30
- New York State Route 97
- New York State Route 206

== Communities ==
=== Larger settlements ===
| # | Location | Population | Type | Sector |
|---|---|---|---|---|
| 1 | Sidney | 3,900 | Village | Northwest |
| 2 | Walton | 3,088 | Village | Southwest |
| 3 | †Delhi | 3,087 | Village | Northeast |
| 4 | ‡Deposit | 1,663 | Village | Southwest |
| 5 | Stamford | 1,119 | Village | Northeast |
| 6 | Hancock | 1,031 | Village | Southwest |
| 7 | ††Downsville | 617 | CDP | Southwest |
| 8 | Margaretville | 596 | Village | Southeast |
| 9 | Hobart | 441 | Village | Northeast |
| 10 | Franklin | 374 | Village | Northwest |
| 11 | Fleischmanns | 351 | Village | Southeast |
| 12 | Davenport Center | 349 | CDP | Northeast |
| 13 | ††Andes | 252 | CDP | Southeast |
| 14 | Bloomville | 213 | CDP | Southwest |

† – County Seat

†† – Former Village

‡ – Not Wholly in this County

=== Towns ===
- Andes
- Bovina
- Colchester
- Davenport
- Delhi
- Deposit
- Franklin
- Hamden
- Hancock
- Harpersfield
- Kortright
- Masonville
- Meredith
- Middletown
- Roxbury
- Sidney
- Stamford
- Tompkins
- Walton

=== Unincorporated communities ===
- Agloe
- Arkville
- Bedell
- Delancey
- Fraser
- Grand Gorge
- Hawleys
- Halcottsville
- Islamberg
- Roxbury
- South Kortright

== Politics ==
Delaware County typically votes for Republicans in local, state, and national elections. The county has voted for two Democratic presidential candidates in its history, Bill Clinton in 1996 and Lyndon B. Johnson in 1964. The last Democrat to win the majority of votes on the gubernatorial level was Andrew Cuomo in 2010.

United States presidential election results for Delaware County, New York
| Year | Republican | | Democratic | | Third party(ies) | |
| Year | No. | % | No. | % | No. | % |
|---|---|---|---|---|---|---|
| 1884 | 5,934 | 51.88% | 4,956 | 43.33% | 549 | 4.80% |
| 1888 | 6,602 | 52.33% | 5,332 | 42.26% | 683 | 5.41% |
| 1892 | 6,421 | 53.07% | 4,706 | 38.90% | 972 | 8.03% |
| 1896 | 7,790 | 61.75% | 4,450 | 35.28% | 375 | 2.97% |
| 1900 | 7,626 | 60.16% | 4,639 | 36.60% | 411 | 3.24% |
| 1904 | 7,628 | 61.54% | 4,347 | 35.07% | 421 | 3.40% |
| 1908 | 7,142 | 58.28% | 4,641 | 37.87% | 472 | 3.85% |
| 1912 | 4,731 | 40.32% | 4,511 | 38.45% | 2,491 | 21.23% |
| 1916 | 6,266 | 53.74% | 4,986 | 42.76% | 408 | 3.50% |
| 1920 | 11,719 | 70.17% | 4,528 | 27.11% | 454 | 2.72% |
| 1924 | 13,020 | 72.66% | 4,158 | 23.20% | 741 | 4.14% |
| 1928 | 16,225 | 78.59% | 4,362 | 21.13% | 58 | 0.28% |
| 1932 | 13,050 | 65.32% | 6,723 | 33.65% | 207 | 1.04% |
| 1936 | 15,164 | 70.98% | 6,142 | 28.75% | 58 | 0.27% |
| 1940 | 15,684 | 72.28% | 5,968 | 27.50% | 48 | 0.22% |
| 1944 | 14,916 | 74.32% | 5,128 | 25.55% | 25 | 0.12% |
| 1948 | 14,226 | 73.05% | 4,965 | 25.50% | 283 | 1.45% |
| 1952 | 17,737 | 81.10% | 4,116 | 18.82% | 18 | 0.08% |
| 1956 | 17,364 | 81.91% | 3,835 | 18.09% | 0 | 0.00% |
| 1960 | 16,336 | 74.21% | 5,662 | 25.72% | 15 | 0.07% |
| 1964 | 8,359 | 41.66% | 11,686 | 58.24% | 19 | 0.09% |
| 1968 | 12,366 | 65.44% | 5,360 | 28.36% | 1,172 | 6.20% |
| 1972 | 15,136 | 74.10% | 5,243 | 25.67% | 47 | 0.23% |
| 1976 | 12,443 | 62.76% | 7,254 | 36.59% | 130 | 0.66% |
| 1980 | 10,609 | 55.36% | 6,333 | 33.05% | 2,222 | 11.59% |
| 1984 | 14,002 | 70.61% | 5,745 | 28.97% | 83 | 0.42% |
| 1988 | 11,391 | 59.92% | 7,463 | 39.26% | 156 | 0.82% |
| 1992 | 8,829 | 43.01% | 7,152 | 34.84% | 4,549 | 22.16% |
| 1996 | 7,684 | 39.62% | 8,724 | 44.98% | 2,986 | 15.40% |
| 2000 | 10,662 | 52.84% | 8,450 | 41.88% | 1,064 | 5.27% |
| 2004 | 11,958 | 56.49% | 8,724 | 41.22% | 485 | 2.29% |
| 2008 | 10,524 | 51.62% | 9,462 | 46.41% | 403 | 1.98% |
| 2012 | 9,938 | 53.32% | 8,304 | 44.55% | 396 | 2.12% |
| 2016 | 11,942 | 60.34% | 6,627 | 33.48% | 1,223 | 6.18% |
| 2020 | 13,387 | 58.14% | 9,143 | 39.71% | 495 | 2.15% |
| 2024 | 13,789 | 59.28% | 9,237 | 39.71% | 234 | 1.01% |

== See also ==
- List of counties in New York
- National Register of Historic Places listings in Delaware County, New York
