= Beadle (disambiguation) =

Beadle is a title.

Beadle may also refer to:

== Places ==
- Beadle County, South Dakota
- Beadle Lake, lake and unincorporated community in Emmett Charter Township, Michigan
- Beadle, Saskatchewan, unincorporated community

== People with the surname ==
- Chauncey Beadle (1866–1950), Canadian-American botanist and horticulturist
- Erastus Flavel Beadle (1821–1894), American printer and publisher
- George Beadle (1903–1989), American scientist in the field of genetics
- George Beadle (rugby league) (1914–1944), New Zealand rugby league footballer
- Harry Beadles (1897–1958), Welsh football forward
- Sir Hugh Beadle (1905–1980), Rhodesian lawyer, politician and judge
- James Beadle (born 2004), English football player
- Jean Beadle (1868–1942), Australian feminist, social worker and Labor party member
- Jeremy Beadle (1948–2008), English television presenter
- Jeremy J. Beadle (1956–1995), English musicologist and broadcaster, unrelated to the above
- Michelle Beadle (born 1975), American sports reporter and host
- Peter Beadle (born 1972), English football forward and manager
- Thomas Beadle (born 1987), American politician
- Tracy Beadle (1808–1877), American druggist, banker, and politician
- William H. H. Beadle (1838–1915) American soldier, lawyer, educator and administrator

== See also ==
- Beadles
- Beedle
- Bedel (disambiguation)
- Bedell (disambiguation)
- Esquire Bedell
