= Beadles =

Beadles is a surname. Notable people with the surname include:

- Elisha Beadles (1670–1734), Welsh Quaker, writer, and translator
- Harry Beadles (1897–1958), Welsh footballer
- Zane Beadles (born 1986), American football player

== See also ==
- Beadles House, historic house located in Stanardsville, Greene County, Virginia
- Beadle (disambiguation)
