= Bedell, New York =

- Hamlet
- Location within New York Location within the United States
- Coordinates: 42°11′42″N 74°33′01″W
- Country: United States
- State: New York
- County: Delaware
- Elevation: 1,854 ft (565 m)
- Time zone: UTC-5 (Eastern (EST))
  - Summer (DST): UTC-4 (EDT)
- Area code: 607
- GNIS feature ID: 972210

Bedell is a hamlet in Delaware County, New York, United States.
