= Bedell Crossing, Maine =

- Village
- Location within Maine
- Coordinates: 43°06′10″N 70°40′32″W
- Country: United States
- State: Maine
- County: York
- Elevation: 16 ft (4.9 m)
- Time zone: UTC-5 (Eastern (EST))
  - Summer (DST): UTC-4 (EDT)
- Area code: 207
- GNIS feature ID: 561978

Bedell Crossing is an unincorporated village in Kittery, York County, Maine, United States.
