= 2008 New York Democratic presidential primary =

- February 5, 2008

Candidate	Hillary Clinton	Barack Obama
Home state	New York	Illinois
Delegate count	139	93
Popular vote	1,068,496	751,019
Percentage	57.37%	40.32%
- County results Clinton: 40–50% 50–60% 60–70% 70–80% Obama: 50–60%

The 2008 New York Democratic presidential primary took place on February 5, 2008, also known as Super Tuesday. Polls indicated that New York Senator Hillary Clinton was leading rival Senator Barack Obama by double digits in the weeks before the contest, and she ended up winning with roughly 57% of the vote. Clinton won every county in her home state except Tompkins County, home to the college town of Ithaca, which strongly supported Obama.

== Polls ==
Polls throughout the campaign indicated that Hillary Clinton, a Senator from New York, was clearly favored to win the New York primary. She won every poll conducted in the state by double digits except one, and got more than 40% in every poll conducted, even with various challengers. After the number of candidates dropped significantly in late January, Clinton won 50% or more in every poll but one.

== Vote discrepancies ==
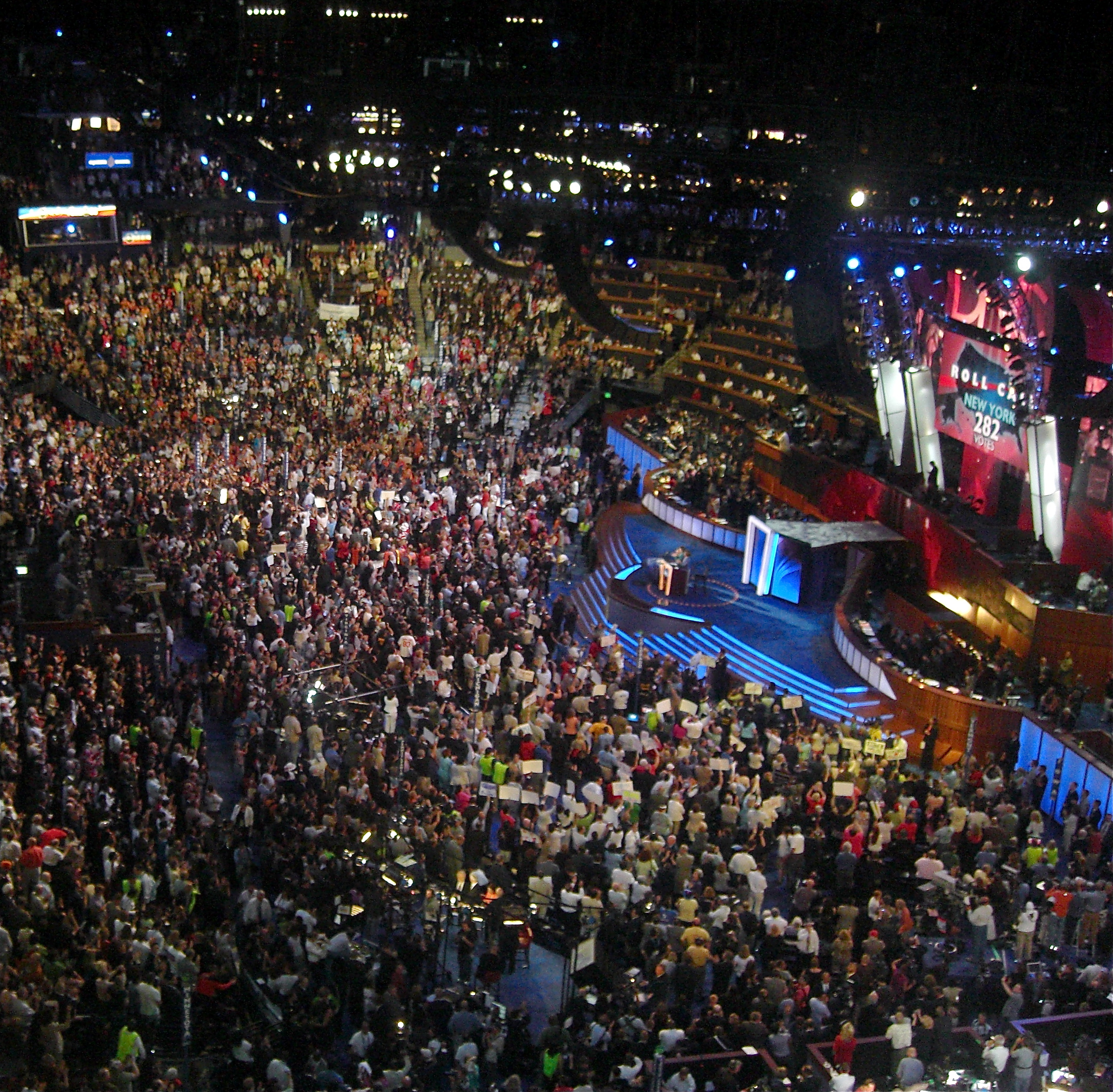
New York is announced as part of the roll call of the states during the third day of the 2008 Democratic National Convention in Denver, Colorado. New Mexico had yielded to Illinois, which in turn yielded to New York so that Senator Hillary Clinton could make a motion promoting party unity.

After the votes were initially counted on election night, certain districts near New York City were found to be missing their vote tallies for Obama. The New York Times conducted a review of the unofficial results from the primary. They found that, among New York City's 6,106 election districts participating, 80 districts did not record a single vote for Obama, including heavily black districts like Harlem, as well as districts next to others where Obama had very favorable results. City election officials reviewed the vote tallies and found several inaccuracies. For example, in Harlem where Clinton led Obama 141 to 0, the recounted vote was counted as 261 to 136, Clinton. In Brooklyn the primary night vote was 118 to 0, Clinton, whereas the recounted vote went 118 to 116, Clinton.

Democratic leaders blamed the discrepancies on "human error" due to weary election officials on primary day. According to ABC News, however, other candidates such as John Edwards did not have this problem; it seemed to be almost exclusive to Obama.

The counting errors only occurred in the election night tallies, which are always unofficial. Following normal procedures, the votes were re-tallied before being officially certified. The final, official results left Clinton with 139 pledged delegates to the 2008 Democratic National Convention and Obama with 93.

== Results ==
Key:	Withdrew prior to contest

New York Democratic presidential primary, 2008
Candidate	Votes	Percentage	National delegates
Hillary Clinton	1,068,496	57.37%	139
Barack Obama	751,019	40.32%	93
John Edwards	21,924	1.18%	0
Dennis Kucinich	8,458	0.45%	0
Bill Richardson	8,227	0.44%	0
Joe Biden	4,321	0.23%	0
Totals	1,862,445	100.00%	232

=== Results by county ===
County	Clinton	%%	Edwards	%%	Obama	%%	Other	Totals	TED	TO%	MV	MV%
Albany	23,625	59.48%	669	1.68%	14,815	37.30%	608	39,717	85,226	46.60%	8,810	22.18%
Allegany	1,422	62.75%	77	3.40%	720	0.317741	47	2,266	6,398	35.42%	702	30.98%
Bronx	90,977	61.21%	897	0.006035	56,142	0.377715	620	148,636	460,721	32.26%	34,835	23.44%
Broome	10,496	62.25%	340	0.020166	5,740	0.340451	284	16,860	41,098	41.02%	4,756	28.21%
Cattaraugus	3,485	68.72%	131	0.025833	1,358	0.267797	97	5,071	16,094	31.51%	2,127	41.94%
Cayuga	4,525	70.67%	111	0.017336	1,635	0.255349	132	6,403	15,464	41.41%	2,890	45.14%
Chautauqua	6,597	66.51%	285	0.028733	2,847	0.287025	190	9,919	28,070	35.34%	3,750	37.81%
Chemung	4,122	66.57%	147	0.02374	1,828	0.29522	95	6,192	15,934	38.86%	2,294	37.05%
Chenango	1,705	62.78%	65	0.023932	891	0.328056	55	2,716	7,513	36.15%	814	29.97%
Clinton	3,347	68.19%	100	0.020375	1,388	0.282804	73	4,908	16,402	29.92%	1,959	39.91%
Columbia	2,889	52.47%	91	0.016527	2,431	0.441518	95	5,506	11,763	46.81%	458	8.32%
Cortland	2,344	66.69%	65	0.018492	1,058	0.300996	48	3,515	8,684	40.48%	1,286	36.59%
Delaware	1,716	60.06%	80	0.028001	1,014	0.354918	47	2,857	7,412	38.55%	702	24.57%
Dutchess	10,834	50.88%	292	0.013712	9,848	0.462456	321	21,295	49,120	43.35%	986	4.63%
Erie	64,586	59.89%	2,159	0.020022	39,366	0.365061	1,723	107,834	277,704	38.83%	25,220	23.39%
Essex	1,307	56.48%	48	0.020743	924	0.399309	35	2,314	6,080	38.06%	383	16.55%
Franklin	2,331	70.17%	64	0.019266	891	0.268212	36	3,322	9,642	34.45%	1,440	43.35%
Fulton	1,889	72.99%	68	0.026275	579	0.223725	52	2,588	7,383	35.05%	1,310	50.62%
Genesee	2,107	71.45%	54	0.018311	740	0.250933	48	2,949	8,919	33.06%	1,367	46.35%
Greene	1,444	59.28%	57	0.023399	888	0.364532	47	2,436	6,744	36.12%	556	22.82%
Hamilton	221	58.16%	16	0.042105	131	0.344737	12	380	936	40.60%	90	23.68%
Herkimer	2,512	69.53%	104	0.028785	917	0.253806	80	3,613	10,378	34.81%	1,595	44.15%
Jefferson	3,828	74.11%	99	0.019167	1,172	0.226912	66	5,165	15,751	32.79%	2,656	51.42%
Kings	137,309	49.41%	2,436	0.008766	136,084	0.489719	2,053	277,882	847,058	32.81%	1,225	0.44%
Lewis	852	70.12%	23	0.01893	325	0.26749	15	1,215	4,387	27.70%	527	43.37%
Livingston	2,444	61.08%	75	0.018745	1,412	0.352912	70	4,001	10,343	38.68%	1,032	25.79%
Madison	2,659	64.43%	73	0.017688	1,331	0.32251	64	4,127	10,626	38.84%	1,328	32.18%
Monroe	34,779	52.73%	794	0.012037	29,514	0.447439	875	65,962	154,711	42.64%	5,265	7.98%
Montgomery	2,522	73.06%	81	0.023465	775	0.224508	74	3,452	9,861	35.01%	1,747	50.61%
Nassau	69,721	62.45%	1,237	0.01108	38,691	0.346572	1,990	111,639	310,968	35.90%	31,030	27.79%
New York	155,662	53.67%	2,478	0.008543	130,217	0.448931	1,703	290,060	643,683	45.06%	25,445	8.77%
Niagara	13,530	67.16%	406	0.020153	5,863	0.291026	347	20,146	53,842	37.42%	7,667	38.06%
Oneida	10,039	65.92%	312	0.020487	4,436	0.291286	442	15,229	42,742	35.63%	5,603	36.79%
Onondaga	23,910	61.62%	448	0.011545	13,930	0.358974	517	38,805	90,559	42.85%	9,980	25.72%
Ontario	4,786	64.31%	100	0.013437	2,469	0.331766	87	7,442	18,192	40.91%	2,317	31.13%
Orange	13,505	56.95%	358	0.015097	9,501	0.400666	349	23,713	64,094	37.00%	4,004	16.89%
Orleans	1,236	70.99%	45	0.025847	427	0.245261	33	1,741	5,772	30.16%	809	46.47%
Oswego	4,344	72.53%	109	0.0182	1,464	0.244448	72	5,989	17,670	33.89%	2,880	48.09%
Otsego	2,418	56.87%	94	0.022107	1,651	0.388288	89	4,252	10,057	42.28%	767	18.04%
Putnam	3,758	55.96%	132	0.019657	2,723	0.40551	102	6,715	16,079	41.76%	1,035	15.41%
Queens	125,165	60.00%	1,558	0.007468	80,525	0.386007	1,362	208,610	612,007	34.09%	44,640	21.40%
Rensselaer	6,081	62.21%	148	0.015141	3,395	0.347315	151	9,775	25,398	38.49%	2,686	27.48%
Richmond	18,828	61.17%	671	0.021801	10,930	0.355124	349	30,778	109,720	28.05%	7,898	25.66%
Rockland	17,908	57.51%	566	0.018177	12,167	0.390744	497	31,138	74,828	41.61%	5,741	18.44%
Saratoga	8,434	61.63%	194	0.014176	4,859	0.35506	198	13,685	33,697	40.61%	3,575	26.12%
Schenectady	8,177	63.89%	220	0.01719	4,185	0.327004	216	12,798	32,738	39.09%	3,992	31.19%
Schoharie	1,157	64.75%	51	0.028539	543	0.303861	36	1,787	4,834	36.97%	614	34.36%
Schuyler	761	61.12%	31	0.0249	432	0.346988	21	1,245	3,263	38.16%	329	26.43%
Seneca	1,843	71.74%	45	0.017517	651	0.253406	30	2,569	6,348	40.47%	1,192	46.40%
St. Lawrence	5,327	72.89%	118	0.016147	1,754	0.240011	109	7,308	21,520	33.96%	3,573	48.89%
Steuben	3,172	65.46%	107	0.02208	1,482	0.305819	85	4,846	14,576	33.25%	1,690	34.87%
Suffolk	55,561	62.09%	1,125	0.012571	31,564	0.35271	1,240	89,490	257,813	34.71%	23,997	26.82%
Sullivan	3,109	59.79%	101	0.019423	1,901	0.365577	89	5,200	17,155	30.31%	1,208	23.23%
Tioga	2,079	63.02%	82	0.024856	1,067	0.323431	71	3,299	8,318	39.66%	1,012	30.68%
Tompkins	5,004	39.51%	194	0.015317	7,283	0.575004	185	12,666	21,708	58.35%	(2,279)	-17.99%
Ulster	8,044	49.92%	259	0.016074	7,525	0.467014	285	16,113	35,448	45.46%	519	3.22%
Warren	2,374	63.32%	72	0.019205	1,239	0.330488	64	3,749	9,465	39.61%	1,135	30.27%
Washington	1,964	64.12%	56	0.018283	994	0.324518	49	3,063	8,387	36.52%	970	31.67%
Wayne	2,973	67.08%	79	0.017825	1,327	0.299413	53	4,432	13,012	34.06%	1,646	37.14%
Westchester	56,531	52.40%	953	0.008833	48,221	0.446967	2,180	107,885	223,309	48.31%	8,310	7.70%
Wyoming	1,189	69.70%	50	0.029308	439	0.257327	28	1,706	6,159	27.70%	750	43.96%
Yates	1,032	69.97%	24	0.016271	400	0.271186	19	1,475	3,159	46.69%	632	42.85%
TOTALS	1,068,496	57.37%	21,924	0.011772	751,019	0.403243	21,010	1,862,449	4,966,942	37.50%	317,477	17.05%

== See also ==
- 2008 Democratic Party presidential primaries
- 2008 New York Republican presidential primary
