= Jon Cooper (politician) =

American politician

Member of the Suffolk County Legislature for the 18th Legislative District
- In office 1999–2011

Personal details
- Party: Democratic
- Spouse: Robert Cooper

Jon Cooper is a former member of the Suffolk County Legislature in Suffolk County, New York. He served as a Democratic majority leader in the 18th legislative district, being elected in 1999. He holds the record for the longest serving legislative majority leader in the history of Suffolk County, serving for 12 years.

Cooper is also notable for advocating for same-sex rights alongside his spouse, Robert Cooper, serving as the only openly Gay candidate every elected in Suffolk County, and one of only a handful of Gay elected politicians anywhere in the United States at that time.

Cooper also authored the first bill in the entire nation to ban the usage of cell phones whilst driving.

== Personal life ==
Jon Cooper is married to Robert Cooper, and has five adopted children.

== Political career ==
Jon Cooper was elected to the Suffolk County Legislature in 1999, winning through 52.8% of the votes. He would go on to serve six consecutive terms, making him the longest serving Majority Leader in Suffolk's history.

During his time as an elected politician, Cooper advocated for same-sex rights, low-income housing, and environmental issues. Cooper also authored the first bill in the entire nation to ban the usage of cell phones whilst driving, with that ban coming into effect in 2000.

After his time in office, Cooper would then serve as Co-chair of the Tri-state region of the Obama Victory Trustees, a fundraiser for Barack Obama's presidential campaign.

== CEO of Spectronics Corporation ==
Outside of politics, Jon Cooper serves as president of Spectronics Corporation, a ultraviolet lighting and fluorescent manufacturing company based out of Westbury, New York

In 2016, Cooper was honored for his achievements in the expansion of Spectronics Corporation by being recognized and inducted into the Long Island Business Hall of Fame.
