= Bedel (surname) =

Bedel is a surname. Notable people with the surname include:

- Ernest Marie Louis Bedel (1849–1922), French entomologist
- Maurice Bedel (1883–1954), French novelist and essayist
- Timothy Bedel (1737–1787), American soldier and politician
