= Bedell (company) =

Offshore magic circle law firm

Bedell Cristin
- Industry: Legal
- Founded: 1939
- Founder: George Bedell, Dick Cristin
- Headquarters: Saint Helier, Jersey
- Number of employees: 175 (December 2011)
- Website: bedellcristin.com

Bedell Cristin is an offshore law firm that provides legal services in various financial jurisdictions for corporate clients, financial institutions, and private clients. It has offices in the British Virgin Islands, Cayman Islands, Guernsey, Jersey, London, and Singapore.

== History ==
In 1939, Advocate George William Bedell founded his practice at 21 Hill Street, Saint Helier, Jersey.

George Bedell had previously been commissioned to introduce income tax to the island and was appointed the first controller of income tax for Jersey in 1928. He was later admitted as a Barrister to the Inner Temple, one of the Inns of Court in London, on 13 March 1963.

After moving back to England during World War II, he returned to Jersey and set up a partnership with lawyer Richard Helier Cristin, known as Dick Cristin.

Together they founded Bedell and Cristin in 1958. Dick Cristin helped pioneer the abolition of the statutory 5% cap on interest rates in 1962. In 1971 the company expanded into managing trusts and created a new division known as Bedell Trust.
