= 2008 New York Republican presidential primary =

- February 5, 2008
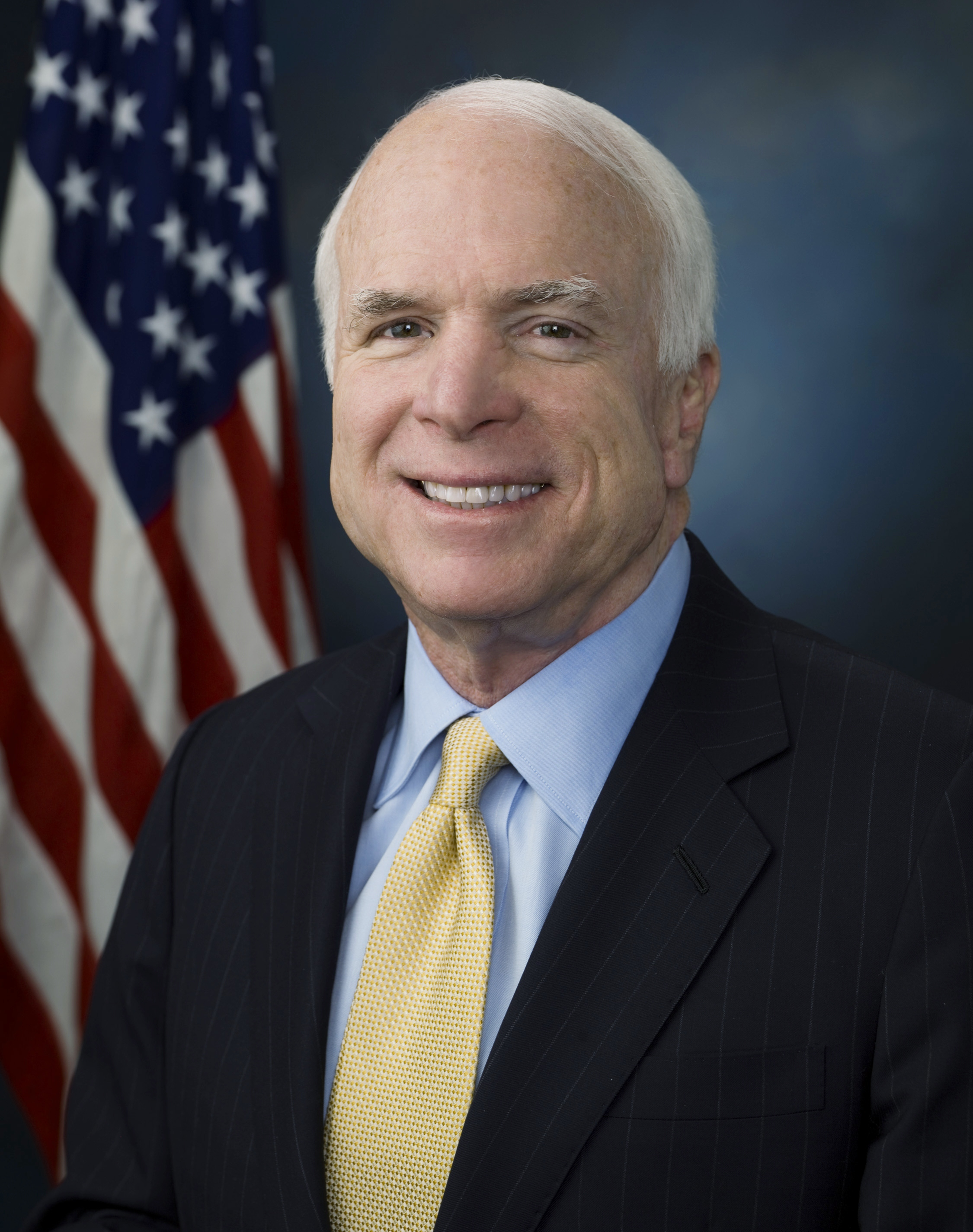

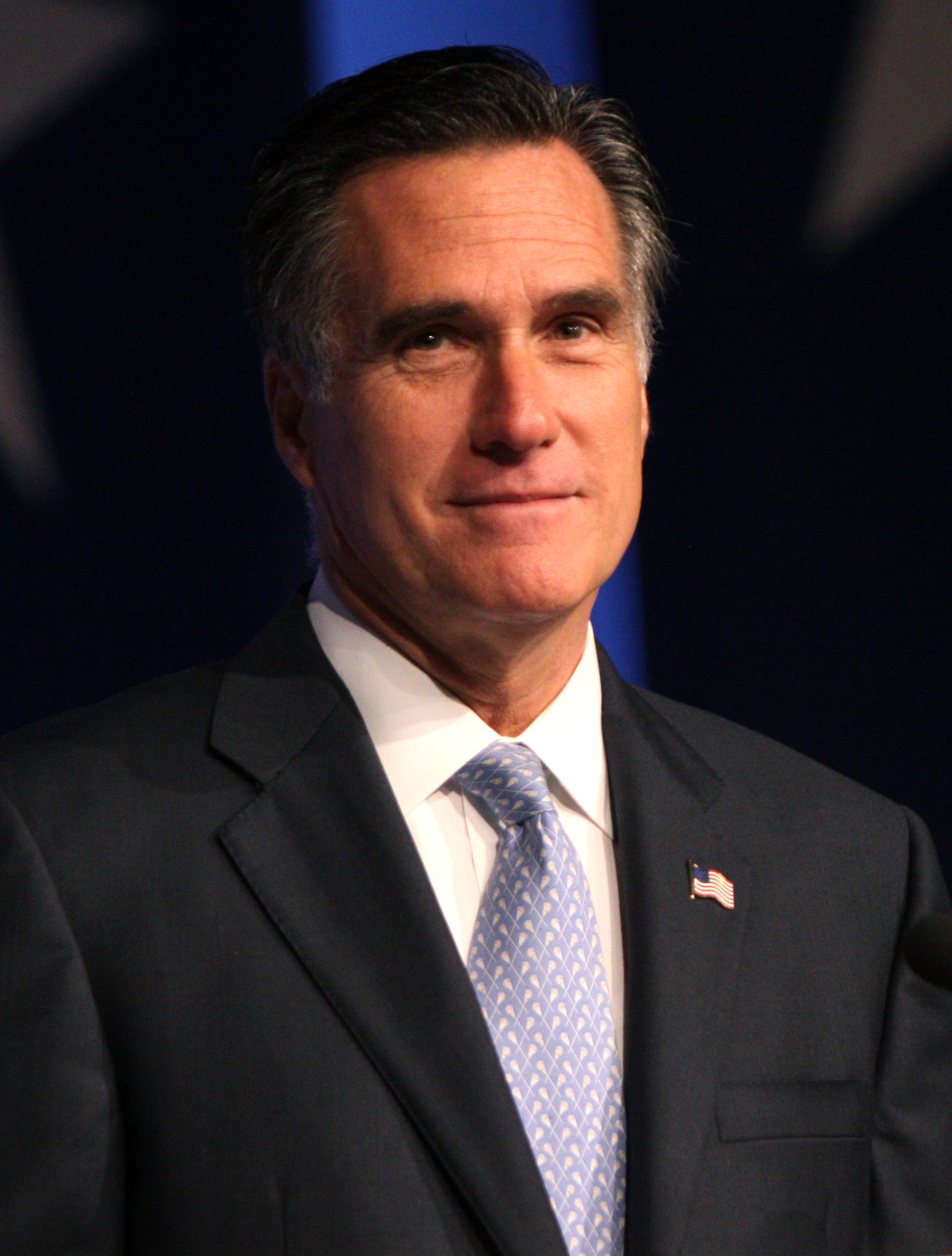

| Nominee | John McCain | Mitt Romney | Mike Huckabee |
| Home state | Arizona | Massachusetts | Arkansas |
| Delegate count | 101 | 0 | 0 |
| Popular vote | 333,001 | 178,043 | 68,477 |
| Percentage | 49.70% | 26.57% | 10.11% |
- County results John McCain

The New York Republican presidential primary was held on February 5, 2008 (Super Tuesday). There were 101 delegates up for grabs for the candidates. The delegates were awarded on a winner-take-all basis, which means the winner, Arizona Senator John McCain, received all 101 delegates for the 2008 Republican National Convention.

On February 2, McCain had held a fairly large lead in the polls above the competition with 35% as opposed to the next candidate Rudy Giuliani with 22.5%, who had announced a withdrawal from the race on January 30, 2008.

== Results ==
Official Results
| Candidate | Votes | Percentage | Delegates |
|---|---|---|---|
| John McCain | 333,001 | 49.70% | 101 |
| Mitt Romney | 178,043 | 26.57% | 0 |
| Mike Huckabee | 68,477 | 10.11% | 0 |
| Ron Paul | 40,113 | 5.99% | 0 |
| Rudy Giuliani* | 23,260 | 3.47% | 0 |
| Blank, Void or Scattering | 27,184 | 4.06% | 0 |
| Total | 670,078 | 100% | 101 |

* Candidate dropped out of the race before the primary

== See also ==
- 2008 New York Democratic presidential primary
- 2008 Republican Party presidential primaries
