= Beedle =

Beedle is a surname or given name which may refer to:

People:

- Ashley Beedle (born 1962), British DJ, producer and remixer
- Ernest A. Beedle (1933–1968), American lawyer and politician
- Martin Frosty Beedle (born 1961), British rock drummer
- George E. Beedle (born 1964), American politician, member of the Wisconsin State Assembly from 1903 to 1906
- Lynn S. Beedle (1917–2003), American structural engineer
- William Beedle Jr., real name of actor William Holden (1918–1981)

Fictional characters:

- The title character of J. K. Rowling's The Tales of Beedle the Bard
- Beedle, in The Legend of Zelda series
- The Japanese name of Weedle, a Pokémon species
