= List of elections in 2008 =

The following elections occurred in the year 2008.

- Electoral calendar 2008
- 2008 United Nations Security Council election

== Africa ==
- 2008 Angolan legislative election
- 2008 Anjouan presidential election
- 2008 Cape Verdean local elections
- 2008 Republic of the Congo Senate election
- 2008 Djiboutian parliamentary election
- 2008 Egyptian municipal elections
- 2008 Equatorial Guinean legislative election
- 2008 Ethiopian local elections
- 2008 Gabonese local elections
- 2008 Ghanaian parliamentary election
- 2008 Ghanaian presidential election
- 2008 Guinea-Bissau legislative election
- 2008 Mahoran legislative election
- 2008 Mauritian presidential election
- 2008 Rwandan parliamentary election
- 2008 Sahrawi legislative election
- 2008 Sierra Leonean local elections
- 2008 South African municipal by-elections
- 2008 South African presidential election
- 2008 Swazi parliamentary election
- 2008 Zambian presidential election
- 2008 Zimbabwean parliamentary election

=== Nigeria ===
- 2008 Kogi State gubernatorial by-election

=== Zimbabwean presidential ===
- 2008 Zimbabwean presidential election
- Campaigning for the 2008 Zimbabwean presidential election
- International reaction to the 2008 Zimbabwean presidential election
- Joint Monitoring and Implementation Committee
- Mavambo/Kusile/Dawn
- Movement for Democratic Change – Mutambara
- Movement for Democratic Change – Tsvangirai
- Operation Mavhoterapapi
- 2008–2009 Zimbabwean political negotiations
- Second round of voting in the 2008 Zimbabwean presidential election
- Simba Makoni presidential campaign, 2008
- 2008 Southern African Development Community emergency meeting
- Morgan Tsvangirai
- Vote counting for the 2008 Zimbabwean presidential election

== Asia ==
- 2008 Armenian presidential election
- 2008 Azerbaijani presidential election
- 2004 Bangkok gubernatorial election
- 2008 Bangkok gubernatorial election
- 2008 Bangladeshi general election
- 2007–2008 Bhutanese National Council election
- 2008 Bhutanese general election
- 2008 Burmese constitutional referendum
- 2008 Cambodian parliamentary election
- 2008 Cypriot presidential election
- 2008 Egyptian municipal elections
- 2008 Hong Kong legislative election
- 2008 Israeli municipal elections
- 2008 Kadima leadership election
- 2008 Kuwaiti parliamentary election
- 2008 Lebanese presidential election
- 2008 Liberal Democratic Party (Japan) leadership election
- 2008 Maldivian presidential election
- 2008 Mongolian legislative election
- 2008 Myanmar constitutional referendum
- 2008 Nepalese Constituent Assembly election
- 2008 Nepalese presidential election
- 2008 South Korean legislative election
- 2008 Sri Lanka Eastern Provincial Council elections
- 2008–2009 Sri Lanka Provincial Council elections
- 2008 Thai Senate election
- 2008–2009 Turkmenistan parliamentary election

=== India ===
- 2008 elections in India
- 2008 Delhi Legislative Assembly election
- 2014 Jammu and Kashmir Legislative Assembly election
- 2008 Karnataka Legislative Assembly election
- 2008 Madhya Pradesh Legislative Assembly election
- 2008 Meghalaya Legislative Assembly election
- 2008 Rajasthan Legislative Assembly election
- 2008 Tripura Legislative Assembly election
- 2008 Uttarakhand local body elections

=== Iran ===
- 2008 Iranian legislative election

=== Japan ===
- 2008 Fujimi mayoral election
- 2008 Kyoto mayoral election
- 2008 Meguro mayoral election
- 2008 Minato mayoral election
- 2008 Nishihara mayoral election
- 2008 Osaka gubernatorial election

=== Malaysia ===
- 2008 Malaysian general election
- 2008 Permatang Pauh by-election
- 2008 Sabah state election

=== Pakistan ===
- 2008 Pakistani general election
- 2008 Pakistani presidential election

=== Philippines ===
- 2008 Autonomous Region in Muslim Mindanao general election
- 2008 Quezon del Sur creation plebiscite

=== Russia ===
- 2008 Russian presidential election
  - Fairness of the 2008 Russian presidential election

=== Taiwan (Republic of China) ===
- 2008 Taiwan legislative election
- List of candidates in the 2008 Taiwan legislative election
- 2008 Taiwan presidential election
- 2008 Taiwanese transitional justice referendum
- 2008 Taiwanese United Nations membership referendums

== Europe ==
- 2008 Alderney election
- 2008 Armenian presidential election
- 2008 Austrian legislative election
- 2008 Azerbaijani presidential election
- 2008 Belarusian parliamentary election
- 2008 Bosnia and Herzegovina municipal elections
- 2008 Czech Senate election
- 2008 Czech presidential election
- 2008 Faroese parliamentary election
- 2008 Fianna Fáil leadership election
- 2008 Finnish local elections
- 2008 Georgian NATO membership referendum
- 2008 Georgian legislative election date referendum
- 2008 Georgian legislative election
- 2008 Georgian presidential election
- 2008 Guernsey general election
- 2008 Hungarian fees abolition referendum
- 2008 Icelandic presidential election
- 2008 Jersey general election
- 2008 Kyiv local election
- 2008 Kosovan presidential election
- 2008 Latvian constitutional referendum
- 2008 Latvian pensions law referendum
- 2008 Lithuanian nuclear power referendum
- 2008 Lithuanian parliamentary election
- 2008 Macedonian parliamentary election
- 2008 Maltese general election
- 2008 Maltese local council elections
- 2008 Monegasque parliamentary election
- 2008 Montenegrin presidential election
- 2008 Romanian legislative election
- 2008 Romanian local election
- 2008 Sammarinese general election
- 2008 Sark general election
- 2008 Serbian presidential election
- 2008 Serbian local elections
- 2008 Serbian parliamentary election
- 2008 Slovenian parliamentary election
- 2008 Swiss referendums
- Twenty-eighth Amendment of the Constitution Bill, 2008 (Ireland)
- 2008 Vojvodina parliamentary election

=== Austria ===
- Austrian legislative election campaign posters, 2008
- Austrian legislative election issue questionnaires, 2008
- 2008 Graz local election
- 2008 Lower Austrian state election
- 2008 Tyrolean state election

=== France ===
- 2008 French Polynesian legislative election
- 2008 French Polynesian presidential election
- 2008 French Senate election
- 2008 French cantonal elections
- 2008 French municipal elections
- 2008 Lyon municipal election
- 2008 Marseille municipal election
- 2008 Paris municipal election

=== Germany ===
- 2008 Bavaria state election
- 2008 Hamburg state election
- 2008 Hesse state election
- 2008 Lower Saxony state election

=== Hungary ===
- Hungarian fees abolition referendum

=== Russia ===
- 2008 Russian presidential election
  - Fairness of the 2008 Russian presidential election

=== Spain ===
- 2008 Andalusian parliamentary election
- 2008 Spanish general election

=== Switzerland ===
- 2008 Swiss Federal Council election
- February 2008 Swiss referendum
- June 2008 Swiss referendum
- November 2008 Swiss referendum

=== United Kingdom ===
==== Parliamentary By-Elections ====
- 2008 Crewe and Nantwich by-election
- 2008 Glasgow East by-election
- 2008 Glenrothes by-election
- 2008 Haltemprice and Howden by-election
- 2008 Henley by-election

==== Party Leadership Elections ====
- 2008 Green Party of England and Wales leadership election
- 2008 Scottish Labour Party deputy leadership election
- 2008 Scottish Labour Party leadership election
- 2008 Scottish Liberal Democrats leadership election

==== United Kingdom local ====
- 2008 United Kingdom local elections

==== Welsh Local ====
- 2008 Ceredigion County Council election
- 2008 Monmouthshire County Council election

==== London Elections ====
- 2008 London mayoral election
- 2008 London Assembly election

===== English local =====
- 2008 Adur Council election
- 2008 Amber Valley Council election
- 2008 Barnsley Council election
- 2008 Barrow-in-Furness Council election
- 2008 Bassetlaw Council election
- 2008 Birmingham City Council election
- 2008 Blackburn with Darwen Council election
- 2008 Bolton Council election
- 2008 Brentwood Council election
- 2008 Broxbourne Council election
- 2008 Burnley Council election
- 2008 Bury Council election
- 2008 Calderdale Council election
- 2008 Cheltenham Council election
- 2008 Cherwell Council election
- 2008 Cheshire East Council election
- 2008 Cheshire West and Chester Council election
- 2008 Chorley Council election
- 2008 Coventry Council election
- 2008 Craven Council election
- 2008 Daventry Council election
- 2008 Derby Council election
- 2008 Dudley Council election
- 2008 Fareham Council election
- 2008 Gosport Council election
- 2008 Halton Council election
- 2008 Harlow Council election
- 2008 Hart Council election
- 2008 Hastings Council election
- 2008 Hull Council election
- 2008 Hyndburn Council election
- 2008 Ipswich Borough Council election
- 2008 Knowsley Council election
- 2008 Liverpool Council election
- 2008 Manchester Council election
- 2008 Mole Valley Council election
- 2008 North Tyneside Council election
- 2007 Norwich Council election
- 2008 Norwich Council election
- 2008 Nuneaton and Bedworth Council election
- 2008 Oldham Council election
- 2008 Oxford City Council election
- 2008 Portsmouth Council election
- 2008 Preston Council election
- 2008 Purbeck Council election
- 2008 Redditch Council election
- 2008 Rochdale Council election
- 2008 Rochford Council election
- 2008 Rossendale Council election
- 2008 Runnymede Council election
- 2008 Rushmoor Council election
- 2008 Salford Council election
- 2008 Sefton Council election
- 2008 Sheffield Council election
- 2008 Slough Council election
- 2010 Solihull Council election
- 2008 Solihull Council election
- 2008 South Tyneside Council election
- 2008 Southend-on-Sea Council election
- 2008 St Albans Council election
- 2008 St Helens Council election
- 2008 Stevenage Council election
- 2008 Stockport Council election
- 2008 Stoke-on-Trent Council election
- 2008 Stratford-on-Avon Council election
- 2008 Swindon Council election
- 2008 Tameside Council election
- 2008 Tamworth Council election
- 2008 Tandridge Council election
- 2008 Three Rivers Council election
- 2008 Thurrock Council election
- 2008 Trafford Council election
- 2008 Tunbridge Wells Council election
- 2008 Wakefield Council election
- 2008 Watford Council election
- 2008 Welwyn Hatfield Council election
- 2008 West Lancashire Council election
- 2008 Weymouth and Portland Council election
- 2008 Wigan Council election
- 2008 Winchester Council election
- 2008 Wirral Council election
- 2008 Woking Council election
- 2008 Wokingham Council election
- 2008 Wolverhampton Council election
- 2008 Worcester Council election
- 2008 Worthing Council election
- 2008 Wyre Forest Council election

== North America ==
- 2008 Belizean constitutional referendum
- 2008 Belizean legislative election
- 2008 Greenlandic self-government referendum

=== Canada ===
- Canadian electoral calendar, 2008
- 2008 Alberta general election
- 2008 Alberta Liberal Party leadership election
- 2008 British Columbia municipal elections
- 2008 Canadian federal by-elections
- 2008 Canadian federal election
- 2008 New Brunswick municipal elections
- 2008 Halifax Regional Municipality municipal election
- 2008 Nova Scotia municipal elections
- 2008 Nunavut general election
- 2008 Progressive Conservative Party of New Brunswick leadership election
- 2008 Quebec general election
- 2008 Quebec provincial by-elections
- 2008 Vancouver municipal election

==== Canadian federal ====
- 2008 Canadian federal election
- Anything But Conservative
- Results of the 2008 Canadian federal election
- Results of the 2008 Canadian federal election by riding
- Newspaper endorsements in the 2008 Canadian federal election
- Opinion polling for the 2008 Canadian federal election
- Scandalpedia
- Timeline of the 2008 Canadian federal election

=== Caribbean ===
- 2008 Barbadian general election
- 2008 Cuban legislative election
- 2008 Cuban presidential election
- 2008 Dominican Republic presidential election
- 2008 Grenadian general election
- 2008 Trinidadian local elections
- 2008 Trinidad and Tobago presidential election

==== Puerto Rican ====
- 2008 Puerto Rican general election
- 2008 Puerto Rico Democratic primary
- 2008 Puerto Rico gubernatorial election
- 2008 New Progressive Party of Puerto Rico primaries
- 2008 Popular Democratic Party of Puerto Rico primaries
- 2008 Puerto Rico Republican caucuses
- United States House of Representatives election in Puerto Rico, 2008

==== United States Virgin Islands ====
- 2008 United States Virgin Islands general election
- United States Virgin Islands Democratic territorial convention, 2008
- United States Virgin Islands Republican caucuses, 2008
- 2008 United States House of Representatives election in the United States Virgin Islands

=== Mexico ===
- 2008 Mexican elections
- 2008 Hidalgo state election

=== Puerto Rican ===
- 2008 Puerto Rican general election
- Puerto Rico Democratic primary, 2008
- 2008 Puerto Rico gubernatorial election
- New Progressive Party (Puerto Rico) primaries, 2008
- Popular Democratic Party (Puerto Rico) primaries, 2008
- Puerto Rico Republican caucuses, 2008
- United States House of Representatives election in Puerto Rico, 2008

=== United States ===
- 2008 United States elections
- 2008 United States presidential election

==== United States Senate ====
- 2008 United States Senate elections
- United States Senate election in Alabama, 2008
- United States Senate election in Alaska, 2008
- United States Senate election in Arkansas, 2008
- United States Senate election in Colorado, 2008
- United States Senate election in Delaware, 2008
- United States Senate election in Georgia, 2008
- United States Senate election in Idaho, 2008
- United States Senate election in Illinois, 2008
- United States Senate election in Iowa, 2008
- United States Senate election in Kansas, 2008
- United States Senate election in Kentucky, 2008
- United States Senate election in Louisiana, 2008
- United States Senate election in Maine, 2008
- United States Senate election in Massachusetts, 2008
- United States Senate election in Michigan, 2008
- United States Senate election in Minnesota, 2008
- United States Senate election in Mississippi, 2008
- United States Senate special election in Mississippi, 2008
- United States Senate election in Montana, 2008
- United States Senate election in Nebraska, 2008
- United States Senate election in New Hampshire, 2008
- United States Senate election in New Jersey, 2008
- United States Senate election in New Mexico, 2008
- United States Senate election in North Carolina, 2008
- United States Senate election in Oklahoma, 2008
- 2008 Opinion polling for the United States Senate elections
- United States Senate election in Oregon, 2008
- United States Senate election in Rhode Island, 2008
- United States Senate election in South Carolina, 2008
- United States Senate election in South Dakota, 2008
- United States Senate election in Tennessee, 2008
- United States Senate election in Texas, 2008
- United States Senate election in Virginia, 2008
- United States Senate election in West Virginia, 2008
- United States Senate election in Wyoming, 2008
- United States Senate special election in Wyoming, 2008

==== United States House of Representatives ====
- 2008 United States House of Representatives elections
- 2008 United States House of Representatives elections in Alabama
- 2008 United States House of Representatives election in Alaska
- 2008 United States House of Representatives election in American Samoa
- 2008 United States House of Representatives elections in Arizona
- 2008 United States House of Representatives elections in Arkansas
- 2008 United States House of Representatives elections in California
- 2008 California's 12th congressional district special election
- 2008 United States House of Representatives elections in Colorado
- United States House of Representatives elections in Connecticut, 2008
- United States House of Representatives election in Delaware, 2008
- United States House of Representatives election in the District of Columbia, 2008
- United States House of Representatives elections in Florida, 2008
- United States House of Representatives elections in Georgia, 2008
- United States House of Representatives election in Guam, 2008
- United States House of Representatives elections in Hawaii, 2008
- United States House of Representatives elections in Idaho, 2008
- United States House of Representatives elections in Illinois, 2008
- 2008 Illinois's 14th congressional district special election
- United States House of Representatives elections in Indiana, 2008
- 2008 Indiana's 7th congressional district special election
- United States House of Representatives elections in Iowa, 2008
- United States House of Representatives elections in Kansas, 2008
- United States House of Representatives elections in Kentucky, 2008
- United States House of Representatives elections in Louisiana, 2008
- 2008 Louisiana's 1st congressional district special election
- 2008 Louisiana's 6th congressional district special election
- 2008 Louisiana's 2nd congressional district election
- United States House of Representatives elections in Maine, 2008
- United States House of Representatives elections in Maryland, 2008
- 2008 Maryland's 4th congressional district special election
- United States House of Representatives elections in Massachusetts, 2008
- United States House of Representatives elections in Michigan, 2008
- 2008 United States House of Representatives elections in Minnesota
- 2008 Mississippi's 1st congressional district special election
- United States House of Representatives elections in Mississippi, 2008
- United States House of Representatives elections in Missouri, 2008
- United States House of Representatives election in Montana, 2008
- United States House of Representatives elections in Nebraska, 2008
- 2008 United States House of Representatives elections in Nevada
- United States House of Representatives elections in New Hampshire, 2008
- United States House of Representatives elections in New Jersey, 2008
- 2008 New Jersey's 7th congressional district election
- United States House of Representatives elections in New Mexico, 2008
- United States House of Representatives elections in New York, 2008
- 2008 New York's 26th congressional district election
- 2008 New York's 19th congressional district election
- 2008 New York's 20th congressional district election
- 2008 New York's 29th congressional district election
- 2008 New York's 25th congressional district election
- 2008 United States House of Representatives elections in North Carolina
- United States House of Representatives election in North Dakota, 2008
- United States House of Representatives election in the Northern Mariana Islands, 2008
- United States House of Representatives elections in Ohio, 2008
- 2008 Ohio's 11th congressional district special election
- United States House of Representatives elections in Oklahoma, 2008
- 2008 Opinion polling for the United States House of Representatives elections
- United States House of Representatives elections in Oregon, 2008
- United States House of Representatives elections in Pennsylvania, 2008
- United States House of Representatives election in Puerto Rico, 2008
- United States House of Representatives elections in Rhode Island, 2008
- United States House of Representatives elections in South Carolina, 2008
- United States House of Representatives election in South Dakota, 2008
- United States House of Representatives elections in Tennessee, 2008
- United States House of Representatives elections in Texas, 2008
- United States House of Representatives elections results, 2008
- United States House of Representatives elections in Utah, 2008
- United States House of Representatives election in Vermont, 2008
- United States House of Representatives election in the United States Virgin Islands, 2008
- United States House of Representatives elections in Virginia, 2008
- 2008 Virginia's 1st congressional district election
- 2008 Virginia's 7th congressional district election
- United States House of Representatives elections in Washington, 2008
- United States House of Representatives elections in West Virginia, 2008
- United States House of Representatives elections in Wisconsin, 2008
- United States House of Representatives election in Wyoming, 2008

==== United States mayoral ====
- 2008 Augusta mayoral election
- 2008 Bakersfield, California mayoral election
- 2008 Baton Rouge mayoral election
- 2008 Fresno mayoral election
- 2008 Honolulu mayoral election
- 2008 Irvine mayoral election
- 2008 Lubbock mayoral election
- 2008 Mesa mayoral election
- 2008 Milwaukee mayoral election
- 2008 Orlando mayoral election
- 2008 Portland, Oregon mayoral election
- 2008 Sacramento mayoral election
- 2008 San Diego mayoral election
- 2008 Santa Ana, California mayoral election
- 2008 Stockton, California mayoral election
- 2008 Virginia Beach mayoral election

==== United States lieutenant gubernatorial ====
- 2008 Delaware lieutenant gubernatorial election
- 2008 Missouri lieutenant gubernatorial election
- 2008 North Carolina lieutenant gubernatorial election
- 2008 Washington lieutenant gubernatorial election

==== United States gubernatorial ====
- 2008 American Samoa gubernatorial election
- 2008 Delaware gubernatorial election
- 2008 Indiana gubernatorial election
- 2008 Missouri Lieutenant gubernatorial election
- 2008 Missouri gubernatorial election
- 2008 Montana gubernatorial election
- 2008 New Hampshire gubernatorial election
- 2008 North Carolina gubernatorial election
- 2008 North Dakota gubernatorial election
- 2008 Puerto Rico gubernatorial election
- 2008 United States gubernatorial elections
- 2008 Utah gubernatorial election
- 2008 Vermont gubernatorial election
- 2008 Washington gubernatorial election
- 2008 West Virginia gubernatorial election
- Opinion polling for the 2008 United States gubernatorial elections

==== Alabama ====
- Alabama Republican primary, 2008
- Alabama Democratic primary, 2008
- 2008 United States House of Representatives elections in Alabama
- 2008 United States Senate election in Alabama
- 2008 United States presidential election in Alabama

==== Alaska ====
- Alaska Republican caucuses, 2008
- Alaska Democratic caucuses, 2008
- 2008 United States House of Representatives election in Alaska
- Juneau, Alaska, regular election, 2008
- 2008 United States Senate election in Alaska
- 2008 United States presidential election in Alaska

==== American Samoa ====
- 2008 American Samoan general election
- American Samoa Democratic caucuses, 2008
- 2008 American Samoa gubernatorial election
- American Samoa Republican caucuses, 2008
- 2008 United States House of Representatives election in American Samoa

==== Arizona ====
- Arizona Democratic primary, 2008
- Arizona Republican primary, 2008
- Arizona Proposition 102 (2008)
- 2008 United States House of Representatives elections in Arizona
- 2008 United States presidential election in Arizona

==== Arkansas ====
- Arkansas Democratic primary, 2008
- Arkansas Proposed Initiative Act No. 1
- Arkansas Republican primary, 2008
- 2008 United States House of Representatives elections in Arkansas
- 2008 United States Senate election in Arkansas
- 2008 United States presidential election in Arkansas

==== California ====
- February 2008 California state elections
- June 2008 California state elections
- November 2008 California state elections
- 2008 California's 12th congressional district special election
- California Democratic primary, 2008
- California Republican primary, 2008
- 2008 San Francisco Board of Supervisors elections
- February 2008 San Francisco general elections
- June 2008 San Francisco general elections
- November 2008 San Francisco general elections
- 2008 California State Assembly elections
- 2008 California State Senate elections
- 2008 United States House of Representatives elections in California
- 2008 United States presidential election in California

==== Colorado ====
- Colorado Democratic caucuses, 2008
- Colorado Republican caucuses, 2008
- 2008 United States House of Representatives elections in Colorado
- 2008 United States Senate election in Colorado
- 2008 United States presidential election in Colorado

==== Connecticut ====
- Connecticut Democratic primary, 2008
- Connecticut Republican primary, 2008
- 2008 Connecticut's 4th congressional district election
- 2008 United States House of Representatives elections in Connecticut
- 2008 United States presidential election in Connecticut

==== Delaware ====
- 2008 Delaware gubernatorial election
- Delaware Republican primary, 2008
- Delaware Democratic primary, 2008
- 2008 United States House of Representatives election in Delaware
- 2008 United States Senate election in Delaware
- 2008 United States presidential election in Delaware

==== Florida ====
- Florida Democratic primary, 2008
- Florida Republican primary, 2008
- 2008 United States House of Representatives elections in Florida
- 2008 United States presidential election in Florida

==== Georgia (U.S. state) ====
- Georgia Democratic primary, 2008
- Georgia Republican primary, 2008
- 2008 Georgia state elections
- 2008 Georgia statewide elections
- 2008 United States House of Representatives elections in Georgia
- 2008 United States Senate election in Georgia
- 2008 United States presidential election in Georgia

==== Guam ====
- 2008 Guamanian general election
- Guam Democratic territorial convention, 2008
- 2008 Guamanian legislative election
- Guam Republican caucuses, 2008
- 2008 United States House of Representatives election in Guam

==== Hawaii ====
- Hawaii Democratic caucuses, 2008
- Hawaii Republican caucuses, 2008
- 2008 United States House of Representatives elections in Hawaii
- 2008 United States presidential election in Hawaii

==== Idaho ====
- Idaho Democratic caucuses, 2008
- Idaho Republican primary, 2008
- 2008 United States House of Representatives elections in Idaho
- 2008 United States Senate election in Idaho
- 2008 United States presidential election in Idaho

==== Illinois ====
- Illinois Democratic primary, 2008
- Illinois Republican primary, 2008
- 2008 Illinois's 14th congressional district special election
- 2008 Illinois Senate election
- 2008 United States House of Representatives elections in Illinois
- 2008 United States Senate election in Illinois
- 2008 United States presidential election in Illinois

==== Indiana ====
- Indiana Democratic primary, 2008
- Indiana Republican primary, 2008
- 2008 Indiana gubernatorial election
- 2008 Indiana's 7th congressional district special election
- 2008 United States House of Representatives elections in Indiana
- 2008 United States presidential election in Indiana

==== Iowa ====
- 2008 Iowa House of Representatives election
- 2008 Iowa Democratic caucuses
- 2008 Iowa Republican caucuses
- 2008 Iowa Senate election
- 2008 United States House of Representatives elections in Iowa
- 2008 United States Senate election in Iowa
- 2008 United States presidential election in Iowa

==== Kansas ====
- Kansas Democratic caucuses, 2008
- Kansas Republican caucuses, 2008
- 2008 United States House of Representatives elections in Kansas
- 2008 United States Senate election in Kansas
- 2008 United States presidential election in Kansas

==== Kentucky ====
- Kentucky Democratic primary, 2008
- Kentucky Republican primary, 2008
- 2008 United States House of Representatives elections in Kentucky
- 2008 United States Senate election in Kentucky
- 2008 United States presidential election in Kentucky

==== Louisiana ====
- Louisiana Democratic primary, 2008
- Louisiana Republican caucuses, 2008
- Louisiana Republican primary, 2008
- 2008 Louisiana's 1st congressional district special election
- 2008 Louisiana's 6th congressional district special election
- 2008 United States House of Representatives elections in Louisiana
- 2008 United States Senate election in Louisiana
- 2008 United States presidential election in Louisiana

==== Maine ====
- Maine Democratic caucuses, 2008
- Maine Republican caucuses, 2008
- 2008 United States House of Representatives elections in Maine
- 2008 United States Senate election in Maine
- 2008 United States presidential election in Maine

==== Maryland ====
- Maryland Democratic primary, 2008
- Maryland Republican primary, 2008
- 2008 Maryland's 4th congressional district special election
- 2008 United States House of Representatives elections in Maryland
- 2008 United States presidential election in Maryland

==== Massachusetts ====
- Massachusetts Democratic primary, 2008
- Massachusetts Republican primary, 2008
- 2008 Massachusetts Senate elections
- 2008 Massachusetts general election
- 2008 Massachusetts House of Representatives elections
- 2008 United States House of Representatives elections in Massachusetts
- 2008 United States Senate election in Massachusetts
- 2008 United States presidential election in Massachusetts

==== Michigan ====
- Michigan Democratic primary, 2008
- Michigan Republican primary, 2008
- 2008 Michigan House of Representatives election
- 2008 United States House of Representatives elections in Michigan
- 2008 United States Senate election in Michigan
- 2008 United States presidential election in Michigan

==== Minnesota ====
- Minnesota Democratic caucuses, 2008
- Minnesota Republican caucuses, 2008
- 2008 Minnesota elections
- 2008 United States House of Representatives elections in Minnesota
- 2008 United States Senate election in Minnesota
- 2008 United States presidential election in Minnesota

==== Mississippi ====
- Mississippi Democratic primary, 2008
- Mississippi Republican primary, 2008
- 2008 Mississippi's 1st congressional district special election
- 2008 United States House of Representatives elections in Mississippi
- 2008 United States Senate special election in Mississippi
- 2008 United States Senate election in Mississippi
- 2008 United States presidential election in Mississippi

==== Missouri ====
- Missouri Democratic primary, 2008
- Missouri Republican primary, 2008
- 2008 Missouri Lieutenant gubernatorial election
- 2008 Missouri gubernatorial election
- 2008 United States House of Representatives elections in Missouri
- 2008 United States presidential election in Missouri

==== Montana ====
- Tom L. Burnett
- Montana Democratic primary, 2008
- Montana Republican caucuses, 2008
- 2008 Montana gubernatorial election
- 2008 United States House of Representatives election in Montana
- 2008 United States Senate election in Montana
- 2008 United States presidential election in Montana

==== Nebraska ====
- Nebraska Democratic caucuses, 2008
- Nebraska Republican primary, 2008
- 2008 United States House of Representatives elections in Nebraska
- 2008 United States Senate election in Nebraska
- 2008 United States presidential election in Nebraska

==== Nevada ====
- Nevada Democratic caucuses, 2008
- Nevada Republican caucuses, 2008
- 2008 United States House of Representatives elections in Nevada
- 2008 United States presidential election in Nevada

==== New Hampshire ====
- New Hampshire Democratic primary, 2008
- New Hampshire Republican primary, 2008
- 2008 New Hampshire gubernatorial election
- 2008 United States House of Representatives elections in New Hampshire
- 2008 United States Senate election in New Hampshire
- 2008 United States presidential election in New Hampshire

==== New Jersey ====
- 2008 Democratic primary in New Jersey
- 2008 New Jersey Democratic presidential primary
- 2008 New Jersey Republican presidential primary
- 2008 New Jersey's 7th congressional district election
- 2008 United States House of Representatives elections in New Jersey
- 2008 United States Senate election in New Jersey
- 2008 United States presidential election in New Jersey

==== New Mexico ====
- 2008 New Mexico Democratic presidential primary
- 2008 New Mexico Republican presidential primary
- 2008 United States House of Representatives elections in New Mexico
- 2008 United States Senate election in New Mexico
- 2008 United States presidential election in New Mexico

==== New York ====
- 2008 New York state elections
- 2008 New York Democratic presidential primary
- 2008 New York Republican presidential primary
- 2008 New York's 19th congressional district election
- 2008 New York's 20th congressional district election
- 2008 New York's 26th congressional district election
- 2008 New York's 29th congressional district election
- 2008 United States House of Representatives elections in New York
- 2008 United States presidential election in New York

==== North Carolina ====
- 2008 North Carolina judicial election
- 2008 North Carolina Council of State election
- 2008 North Carolina Democratic primary
- 2008 North Carolina lieutenant gubernatorial election
- 2008 North Carolina Republican primary
- 2008 North Carolina gubernatorial election
- 2008 North Carolina Senate election
- 2008 United States House of Representatives elections in North Carolina
- 2008 United States Senate election in North Carolina
- 2008 United States presidential election in North Carolina

==== North Dakota ====
- North Dakota Democratic caucuses, 2008
- North Dakota Republican caucuses, 2008
- 2008 North Dakota gubernatorial election
- 2008 United States House of Representatives election in North Dakota
- 2008 United States presidential election in North Dakota

==== Northern Mariana Islands ====
- Northern Mariana Islands Republican caucuses, 2008
- 2008 United States House of Representatives election in the Northern Mariana Islands

==== Ohio ====
- 2008 Ohio's 11th congressional district special election
- Ohio Democratic primary, 2008
- Ohio Republican primary, 2008
- 2008 United States House of Representatives elections in Ohio
- 2008 United States presidential election in Ohio

==== Oklahoma ====
- Oklahoma Democratic primary, 2008
- Oklahoma Republican primary, 2008
- 2008 Oklahoma state elections
- 2008 United States House of Representatives elections in Oklahoma
- 2008 United States Senate election in Oklahoma
- 2008 United States presidential election in Oklahoma

==== Oregon ====
- Mike Erickson
- Oregon Democratic primary, 2008
- Oregon Republican primary, 2008
- 2008 Oregon legislative elections
- 2008 Oregon state elections
- 2008 United States House of Representatives elections in Oregon
- 2008 United States Senate election in Oregon
- 2008 United States presidential election in Oregon

==== Pennsylvania ====
- Pennsylvania Democratic primary, 2008
- Pennsylvania Republican presidential primary, 2008
- 2008 Pennsylvania Attorney General election
- 2008 Pennsylvania Auditor General election
- 2008 Pennsylvania House of Representatives elections
- 2008 Pennsylvania Senate elections
- 2008 Pennsylvania State Treasurer election
- 2008 Pennsylvania elections
- 2008 United States House of Representatives elections in Pennsylvania
- 2008 United States presidential election in Pennsylvania

==== Puerto Rican ====
- 2008 Puerto Rican general election
- Puerto Rico Democratic primary, 2008
- 2008 Puerto Rico gubernatorial election
- New Progressive Party (Puerto Rico) primaries, 2008
- Popular Democratic Party (Puerto Rico) primaries, 2008
- Puerto Rico Republican caucuses, 2008
- 2008 United States House of Representatives election in Puerto Rico
- 2008 United States presidential election in Puerto Rico

==== Rhode Island ====
- Rhode Island Democratic primary, 2008
- Rhode Island Republican primary, 2008
- 2008 United States Senate election in Rhode Island
- 2008 United States presidential election in Rhode Island

==== South Carolina ====
- South Carolina Democratic primary, 2008
- South Carolina Republican primary, 2008
- 2008 South Carolina Senate elections
- Stephen Colbert presidential campaign, 2008
- 2008 United States House of Representatives elections in South Carolina
- 2008 United States presidential election in South Carolina
- 2008 United States Senate election in South Carolina

==== South Dakota ====
- South Dakota Democratic primary, 2008
- South Dakota Republican primary, 2008
- 2008 United States House of Representatives election in South Dakota
- 2008 United States Senate election in South Dakota
- 2008 United States presidential election in South Dakota

==== Tennessee ====
- Tennessee Democratic primary, 2008
- Tennessee Republican primary, 2008
- 2008 United States House of Representatives elections in Tennessee
- 2008 United States presidential election in Tennessee
- 2008 United States Senate election in Tennessee

==== Texas ====
- 2008 Texas Legislature elections
- Texas Democratic primary and caucuses, 2008
- Texas Republican primary, 2008
- 2008 United States House of Representatives elections in Texas
- 2008 United States Senate election in Texas
- 2008 United States presidential election in Texas

==== United States Virgin Islands ====
- 2008 United States Virgin Islands Democratic territorial convention
- 2008 United States Virgin Islands Republican caucuses
- 2008 United States Virgin Islands general election
- 2008 United States House of Representatives election in the United States Virgin Islands

==== Utah ====
- Utah Democratic primary, 2008
- Utah Republican primary, 2008
- 2008 Utah gubernatorial election
- 2008 United States House of Representatives elections in Utah
- 2008 United States presidential election in Utah

==== Vermont ====
- Vermont Democratic primary, 2008
- Vermont Republican primary, 2008
- 2008 Vermont elections
- 2008 Vermont gubernatorial election
- 2008 United States presidential election in Vermont

==== Virginia ====
- Virginia Democratic primary, 2008
- Virginia Republican primary, 2008
- 2008 Virginia elections
- 2008 Virginia's 1st congressional district election
- 2008 Virginia's 7th congressional district election
- 2008 United States House of Representatives elections in Virginia
- 2008 United States Senate election in Virginia
- 2008 United States presidential election in Virginia

==== Washington (U.S. state) ====
- Charter Amendment One (Pierce County, 2008)
- Washington Death with Dignity Act
- Washington Democratic caucuses, 2008
- Washington Republican caucuses, 2008
- Washington Republican primary, 2008
- 2008 Washington State Executive elections
- 2008 Washington attorney general election
- 2008 Washington secretary of state election
- 2008 Washington State House elections
- 2008 Washington State Judicial elections
- 2008 Washington State Senate elections
- 2008 Washington State Supreme Court elections
- 2008 Washington State local elections
- 2008 Washington gubernatorial election
- 2008 United States House of Representatives elections in Washington
- 2008 United States presidential election in Washington (state)

==== Washington, D.C. ====
- 2008 United States House of Representatives election in the District of Columbia
- 2008 United States presidential election in the District of Columbia

==== West Virginia ====
- West Virginia Democratic primary, 2008
- West Virginia Republican caucuses and primary, 2008
- 2008 West Virginia gubernatorial election
- 2008 United States House of Representatives elections in West Virginia
- 2008 United States Senate election in West Virginia
- 2008 United States presidential election in West Virginia

==== Wisconsin ====
- Wisconsin Democratic primary, 2008
- Wisconsin Republican primary, 2008
- 2008 Wisconsin state elections
- 2008 United States House of Representatives elections in Wisconsin
- 2008 United States presidential election in Wisconsin

==== Wyoming ====
- Wyoming Democratic caucuses, 2008
- Wyoming Republican caucuses, 2008
- 2008 United States House of Representatives election in Wyoming
- 2008 United States Senate election in Wyoming
- 2008 United States Senate special election in Wyoming
- 2008 United States presidential election in Wyoming

=== United States Virgin Islands ===
- United States Virgin Islands Democratic territorial convention, 2008
- United States Virgin Islands Republican caucuses, 2008
- 2008 United States Virgin Islands general election
- 2008 United States House of Representatives election in the United States Virgin Islands

== Oceania ==
- 2008 Bougainvillean presidential election
- 2008 French Polynesian legislative election
- 2008 French Polynesian presidential election
- 2008 Marshall Islands presidential election
- 2008 Nauruan parliamentary election
- 2008 Niuean general election
- 2008 Palauan general election
- 2008 Palauan presidential election
- 2008 Tokelauan general election
- 2008 Tongan general election
- 2008 Tuvaluan constitutional referendum
- 2008 Vanuatuan general election

=== American Samoa ===
- 2008 American Samoan general election
- American Samoa Democratic caucuses, 2008
- 2008 American Samoa gubernatorial election
- American Samoa Republican caucuses, 2008
- United States House of Representatives election in American Samoa, 2008

=== Australia ===
- 2008 Australian Capital Territory election
- 2008 Cabramatta state by-election
- 2008 City of Melbourne election
- 2008 Gippsland by-election
- 2008 Kororoit state by-election
- 2008 Lakemba state by-election
- 2008 Liberal Party of Australia leadership election
- 2008 Lyne by-election
- 2008 Mayo by-election
- 2008 Murdoch state by-election
- 2008 Northern Territory general election
- 2008 Port Macquarie state by-election
- 2008 Ryde state by-election
- 2008 Western Australian state election

=== Guam ===
- 2008 Guamanian general election
- Guam Democratic territorial convention, 2008
- 2008 Guamanian legislative election
- Guam Republican caucuses, 2008
- United States House of Representatives election in Guam, 2008

=== Hawaii ===
- Hawaii Democratic caucuses, 2008
- Hawaii Republican caucuses, 2008
- United States House of Representatives elections in Hawaii, 2008
- United States presidential election in Hawaii, 2008

=== New Zealand general ===
- 2008 New Zealand general election
- 49th New Zealand Parliament
- Opinion polling for the 2008 New Zealand general election
- Party lists in the 2008 New Zealand general election

=== Northern Mariana Islands ===
- Northern Mariana Islands Republican caucuses, 2008
- United States House of Representatives election in the Northern Mariana Islands, 2008

== South America ==
- 2008 Bolivian autonomy referendums
- 2008 Bolivian vote of confidence referendum
- 2008 Brazilian municipal elections
- 2008 Chilean municipal election
- 2008 Ecuadorian constitutional referendum
- 2008 Paraguayan general election
- 2008 Santa Cruz autonomy referendum
- 2008 Tarija autonomy referendum
- 2008 Venezuelan regional elections
