= Next Egyptian municipal elections =

Future local elections in Egypt

Public discussion about holding new Egyptian municipal elections has occurred fitfully since provisions for reorganized local councils were established by the 2014 Constitution.

== Background ==
The 2008 Egyptian municipal election were held during the Hosni Mubarak presidency of Egypt. The 52,000 seats were "fixed, sealed and delivered" to the National Democratic Party supporting Mubarak, excluding the Muslim Brotherhood, who had wished to field candidates. The municipal councils were closed down in 2011.

== Timeline ==
=== 2015–2017 ===
Concrete preparations were supposed to have begun in late 2015. In March 2016 Prime Minister Sherif Ismail announced that his government aimed to hold local elections during the first quarter of 2017. This was soon contradicted by a proclamation by President el-Sisi that he had ordered local elections to be held by the end of 2016. Members of the majority 'Support Egypt' bloc in parliament, to the contrary, reported that local elections would be held in the second half of 2017. The Egyptian Council of Localities pointed to this lack of clarity on the date, as well as the absence of a local electoral law to implement the Constitution's provisions, as obstacles to actually holding the elections. By mid-2017 parliament decided to postpone the election until late 2018 or early 2019.

=== 2018–2020 ===
After drafting a local elections law in May 2018, parliament renewed its commitment to hold the election by the end of that year — before the expiration of the existing local administrations in early 2019, as stipulated by the Constitution. But the draft law was tabled in parliament pending further discussions, again postponing plans to organize a vote. That November el-Sisi directed that the elections be held early in 2019, but by the following June the president was openly indicating that the proposed elections laws would have to be redrafted before the process got underway. A new draft was eventually submitted by the government to parliament only in late December 2019. Supporters of the original draft law pointed to the apprehension of the security services, heightened by recent protests, behind the repeated delays and resistance to implementing decentralized responsible government.

While parliament was waiting for el-Sisi's new draft law, the president again proclaimed that the elections would be held soon, "in early 2020". But other officials were quick to clarify that this was not seriously to be expected. In early 2020 a number of parliamentarians and jurists stated that if el-Sisi's suggestion of organizing local elections concurrently with elections to the House of Representatives and Senate were implemented, then the local polls might be held at the beginning of 2021. As of 2020, although the national elections proceeded as expected in late 2020, despite the COVID-19 pandemic, no further progress has been made public on organizing local elections.
