= 2008 Welwyn Hatfield Borough Council election =

2008 UK local government election

Results of the 2008 Welwyn Hatfield Borough Council election

The 2008 Welwyn Hatfield Borough Council election took place on 1 May 2008 to elect members of Welwyn Hatfield Borough Council in Hertfordshire, England. The whole council was up for election with boundary changes since the last election in 2007. The Conservative Party stayed in overall control of the council.

== Election result ==
The results saw the Conservatives hold on to control of the council with 40 seats, as compared to 5 for Labour and 3 for the Liberal Democrats. Overall turnout in the election was 36.32%.

A few days after the election the new Conservative councillor for Hatfield Central, Darren Gilbert, was forced to resign after it was alleged that he had made up a claim that he had had cancer, meaning that a by-election had to be held.

Welwyn Hatfield local election result 2008
Party	Seats	Gains	Losses	Net gain/loss	Seats %	Votes %	Votes	+/−
Conservative	40			+5	83.3	59.7	42,477	+5.1%
Labour	5			-5	10.4	19.4	13,810	-5.7%
Liberal Democrats	3			0	6.3	18.2	12,930	+1.5%
Green	0			0	0	2.6	1,851	-1.0%
BNP	0			0	0	0.2	131	+0.2%

== Ward results ==
Brookmans Park and Little Heath (3)
Party	Candidate	Votes	%	±%
Conservative	Stephen Boulton	1,708		
Conservative	Irene Dean	1,499		
Conservative	John Dean	1,476		
Liberal Democrats	Jenny Blumson	304		
Labour	James Croft	197		
Turnout		5,194	45.4	

Haldens (3)
Party	Candidate	Votes	%	±%
Conservative	Lauren Brown	836		
Conservative	Howard Hughes	781		
Conservative	Martyn Levitt	778		
Labour	Mike Larkins	600		
Labour	Mark Biddle	582		
Labour	Margaret Hurst	573		
Liberal Democrats	Edward Walkington	220		
Liberal Democrats	Rhoda Brutey	219		
Turnout		4,589	34.1	

Handside (3)
Party	Candidate	Votes	%	±%
Conservative	Helen Bromley	1,385		
Conservative	Fiona Thomson	1,370		
Liberal Democrats	Tony Skottowe	1,338		
Liberal Democrats	Adam Neal	1,283		
Liberal Democrats	Nigel Quinton	1,278		
Conservative	Tony Kingsbury	1,221		
Labour	Peter Heyman	167		
Labour	John Pomroy	159		
Turnout		8,201	55.9	

Hatfield Central (3)
Party	Candidate	Votes	%	±%
Conservative	Darren Gilbert	535		
Labour	Mike Alder	512		
Labour	Colin Croft	501		
Conservative	David Falco	484		
Labour	Margaret White	473		
Conservative	Bukky Olawoyin	463		
Liberal Democrats	Adam Edwards	211		
Liberal Democrats	Heather Richardson	188		
Liberal Democrats	Karen Richardson	177		
Turnout		3,544	28.5	

Hatfield East (3)
Party	Candidate	Votes	%	±%
Conservative	Mick Long	934		
Conservative	Bernard Sarson	906		
Conservative	Paul Smith	889		
Labour	Constance Elliott	376		
Labour	Sheila Jones	358		
Liberal Democrats	Lis Meyland-Smith	348		
Liberal Democrats	Jacqueline Brennan	336		
Labour	Susana Tinsley	298		
Turnout		4,445	33.5	

Hatfield South (2)
Party	Candidate	Votes	%	±%
Conservative	Richard Hedges	514		
Conservative	David Hughes	483		
Labour	Linda Mendez	409		
Labour	Andrew Tinsley	344		
Liberal Democrats	Sheila Archer	157		
Liberal Democrats	Richard Griffiths	121		
Turnout		2,028	28.2	

Hatfield Villages (3)
Party	Candidate	Votes	%	±%
Conservative	Clare Berry	629		
Conservative	Mark Gilding	577		
Conservative	Howard Morgan	544		
Labour	Mel Jones	245		
Labour	Susan Archer	200		
Labour	Ian Scammell	197		
Liberal Democrats	Alex Benakis	129		
Liberal Democrats	Maurice Richardson	126		
Turnout		2,647	25.7	

Hatfield West (3)
Party	Candidate	Votes	%	±%
Conservative	Nick Atkinson	976		
Conservative	Kim Morris	944		
Conservative	Carol Juggins	938		
Labour	Maureen Cook	669		
Labour	Dee Ferner	588		
Labour	Cathy Watson	525		
Liberal Democrats	Hazel Laming	381		
Liberal Democrats	James Finlay	298		
Liberal Democrats	Sheila Tidy	272		
Turnout		5,591	33.5	

Hollybush (3)
Party	Candidate	Votes	%	±%
Labour	Lynn Chesterman	610		
Conservative	Sarah Atkinson	607		
Labour	Margaret Birleson	594		
Conservative	Ronald Smith	560		
Labour	Sue Jones	513		
Conservative	Stuart Pile	480		
Liberal Democrats	Win Smith	240		
Turnout		3,604	28.2	

Howlands (3)
Party	Candidate	Votes	%	±%
Conservative	Hannah Berry	795		
Conservative	Les Page	725		
Conservative	George Michaelides	678		
Green	Jill Weston	596		
Labour	Alan Chesterman	443		
Labour	Zacha Hennessey	384		
Labour	Brian Payne	365		
Green	Susan Groom	325		
Green	Ian Nendrick	325		
Liberal Democrats	Lynda Cowan	168		
Turnout		4,804	39.2	

Northaw and Cuffley (3)
Party	Candidate	Votes	%	±%
Conservative	Colin Couch	1,235		
Conservative	John Mansfield	1,144		
Conservative	John Nicholls	1,143		
Liberal Democrats	Nigel Bain	329		
Turnout		3,851	36.3	

Panshanger (3)
Party	Candidate	Votes	%	±%
Conservative	Sara Johnston	916		
Conservative	Darren Bennett	884		
Conservative	Roger Trigg	844		
Labour	Brian Edwards	346		
Green	Hollyann Holdsworth	258		
Liberal Democrats	Shirley Shaw	247		
Liberal Democrats	Jonquil Basch	213		
Turnout		3,708	32.1	

Peartree (3)
Party	Candidate	Votes	%	±%
Liberal Democrats	Malcolm Cowan	516		
Liberal Democrats	Louise Lotz	470		
Labour	Steve Roberts	453		
Labour	Dean Milliken	452		
Liberal Democrats	Frank Marsh	443		
Labour	Jacqui Russell	399		
Conservative	Christopher Hay	397		
Conservative	Stanley Laver-Walton	321		
Conservative	Sandra Benjamin	310		
Turnout		3,761	26.9	

Sherrards (3)
Party	Candidate	Votes	%	±%
Conservative	Alan Franey	1,015		
Conservative	Jonathan Beckerman	993		
Conservative	Patricia Mabbott	993		
Labour	Bill Couzens	470		
Liberal Democrats	Jonathan Arch	393		
Labour	Tony Crump	384		
Liberal Democrats	Valerie Skottowe	368		
Green	Bernice Dowlen	347		
Turnout		4,963	43.7	

Welham Green (2)
Party	Candidate	Votes	%	±%
Conservative	Doug Berry	754		
Conservative	Keith Pieri	752		
Liberal Democrats	Simon Archer	510		
Liberal Democrats	Paul Zukowskyj	411		
BNP	Mark Fuller	131		
Labour	Bridgit Croft	83		
Turnout		2,641	49.7	

Welwyn East (3)
Party	Candidate	Votes	%	±%
Conservative	Julie Cragg	1,513		
Conservative	Carl Storer	1,457		
Conservative	Steven Markiewicz	1,425		
Liberal Democrats	Janice Skidmore	265		
Liberal Democrats	June Burnham	250		
Labour	Julia Henderson	226		
Liberal Democrats	Jack Burnham	215		
Turnout		5,351	41.7	

Welwyn West (2)
Party	Candidate	Votes	%	±%
Conservative	Andrew Canter	840		
Conservative	Mandy Perkins	826		
Liberal Democrats	John Blackburn	269		
Liberal Democrats	Ian Skidmore	237		
Labour	Mbizo Mpofu	115		
Turnout		2,287	39.4	
