= 2008 Mexican elections =

A number of elections on the local level took place in Mexico in 2008.

== Local elections ==
Date	State	Voters have/will elected	Main article	Winner(s)
February 3, 2008	Baja California Sur	Municipalities, State congress	2008 Baja California Sur state election	
February 3, 2008	Quintana Roo	Municipalities, State congress	2008 Quintana Roo state election	
February 17, 2008	Hidalgo	State congress	2008 Hidalgo state election	
July 6, 2008	Nayarit	Municipalities, State congress	2008 Nayarit state election	
October 5, 2008	Guerrero	Municipalities, State congress	2008 Guerrero state election	
October 19, 2008	Coahuila	State congress	2008 Coahuila state election	
November 9, 2008	Hidalgo	Municipalities	2008 Hidalgo state election	
