= 2008 United States House of Representatives election in Guam =

United States House of Representatives of Guam
- November 4, 2008
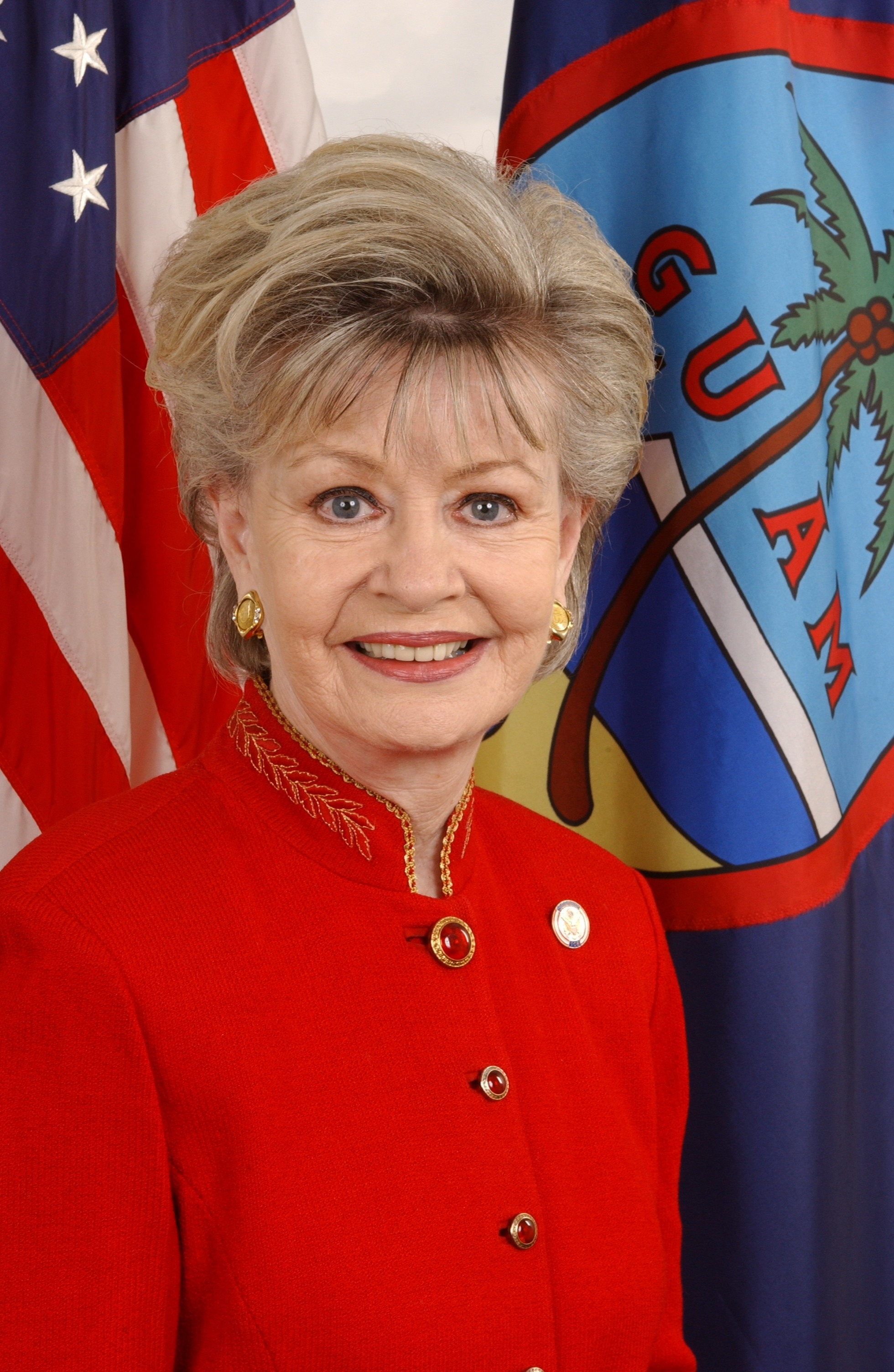
Nominee	Madeleine Bordallo (unopposed)
Party	Democratic
Popular vote	28,247
Percentage	94.59%
Delegate before election
Madeleine Bordallo
Democratic
Elected Delegate
Madeleine Bordallo
Democratic

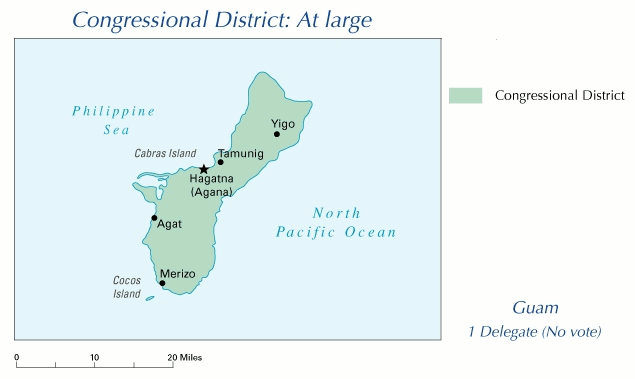
Guam's at-large congressional district

The 2008 Congressional election for the Delegate from Guam's at-large congressional district was held on November 4, 2008.

The non-voting delegate to the United States House of Representatives from Guam is elected for two-year terms. Incumbent Democrat Madeleine Bordallo ran unopposed and served in the 111th Congress from January 4, 2009, until her term of office expired on January 3, 2011. The election coincided with the 2008 U.S. presidential election.

== Results ==
Guam's at-large congressional district election, 2008
Party	Candidate	Votes	%
Democratic	Madeleine Bordallo (inc.)	28,247	94.59
Write-ins		1,617	5.41
Total votes		29,864	100.00
Democratic hold			

== See also ==
- 2008 Guamanian general election
