= Joint Monitoring and Implementation Committee =

The Joint Monitoring and Implementation Committee (JOMIC) is a Zimbabwean multipartisan panel that was first launched on January 30, 2009, pursuant of the 2008 Zimbabwean power-sharing agreement.

== Goals ==
- "to ensure the implementation, in letter and spirit, of the Global Political Agreement
- "to assess the implementation of the Global Political Agreement from time to time and consider steps which might need to be taken to ensure the speedy and full implementation of the Agreement in its entirety
- "to receive reports and complaints in respect of any issue related to the implementation, enforcement and execution of the agreement
- "to serve as catalyst in creating and promoting an atmosphere of mutual trust and understanding between the parties
- "to promote continuing dialogue between the parties."

== Composition ==
=== MDC-M ===
- Welshman Ncube (co-chairperson)
- Frank Chamunorwa
- Edward Mkhosi
- Priscilla Misihairambwi-Mushonga

=== MDC-T ===
- Elton Mangoma (co-chairperson)
- Elias Mudzuri
- Tabita Khumalo
- Innocent Changonda

=== ZANU PF ===
- Nicholas Goche (co-chairperson)
- Patrick Chinamasa
- Emmerson Mnangagwa
- Oppah Muchinguri
