= 2008 Sierra Leonean local elections =

Local elections were held in Sierra Leone on 5 July 2008 for the second time since the Sierra Leonean Civil War. Following this election, the United Nations political mission UNIOSIL planned to withdraw. According to early results, the ruling All People's Congress is leading the Sierra Leone People's Party, with the People's Movement for Democratic Change clearly behind in third place.
