= 2008 Hawaii Democratic presidential caucuses =

- February 19, 2008

29 Democratic National Convention delegates (13 pledged, 9 unpledged)

Candidate	Barack Obama	Hillary Clinton
Home state	Illinois	New York
Delegate count	14	6
Popular vote	28,427	8,846
Percentage	75.77%	23.58%
- Primary results by county Obama: 70–80%

The 2008 Hawaii Democratic presidential caucuses took place on February 19, 2008, with 20 pledged delegates at stake. The winner in each of Hawaii's two congressional districts was awarded all of that district's delegates, totaling 13. Another seven delegates were awarded to both candidates at the Hawaii Democratic Party State Convention on May 23–25, 2008. These 20 delegates represented Hawaii at the Democratic National Convention in Denver, Colorado. Nine other unpledged delegates, known as superdelegates, also attended the convention and cast their votes as well.

== Rules ==
The Hawaii Democratic Caucus began with a presidential preference poll taken in the first half-hour of the caucus. The results were then tabulated and precinct officers and delegates to the state convention were then elected. Those delegates were bound by the results of the caucus, and there no realignment was permitted between non-viable groups, as in some other caucuses. The caucus was open to all registered Democrats, and voters not registered with the Democratic Party, as well as new voters who were permitted to register on site. Actual delegates to the national conventions were selected at the Hawaii Democratic Party State Convention, held May 25, 2008.

== Results ==
Hawaii Democratic Presidential Caucus Results – 2008
Party	Candidate	Votes	Percentage	Delegates
Democratic	Barack Obama	28,472	75.77%	14
Democratic	Hillary Clinton	8,846	23.58%	6
Democratic	Dennis Kucinich	138	0.37%	0
Democratic	Uncommitted	67	0.18%	0
Democratic	John Edwards	41	0.11%	0
Totals		'37,519	100.00%	20
Voter turnout		%		—

== Analysis ==
Hawaii, the state where Barack Obama was born, delivered a massive three-to-one victory for the former U.S. Senator from Illinois. Obama carried all four counties and every island in the state with well over 75 percent of the vote. His worst performance was on Oahu, which contains Honolulu, where he received just under 75 percent.

Although she did not perform well here, Hillary Rodham Clinton received two major endorsements from the state’s two U.S. Senators Daniel Inouye and Daniel Akaka.

== See also ==
- Democratic Party (United States) presidential primaries, 2008
- Hawaii Republican caucuses, 2008
