= Simba Makoni 2008 presidential campaign =

Simba Makoni
- Simba Makoni campaign logo

Independent candidate for President of Zimbabwe
- Election date 2008

Personal details
- Party: Independent
- Occupation: Minister of Finance and Economic Development 2000 – 2002; Managing Director, Zimbabwe Newspapers (1980) LTD 1994 – 1997
- Website: Simba Makoni 2008

In January, 2008 the BBC reported that Simba Makoni might be nominated to run against Robert Mugabe in the Zimbabwean 2008 presidential election.

== Announcement ==
On 5 February 2008 Simba Makoni held a press conference in Harare where he stated that he was challenging Robert Mugabe to become the next President of Zimbabwe. Up to that point he had remained a member of the ZANU-PF politburo and the party's Deputy Secretary of Economic Affairs.

He told reporters, flanked by Ibbo Mandaza and Retired Major Kudzai Mbudzi:

"Following very extensive and intensive consultations with party members and activists countrywide, and also with others outside the party, I have accepted the call and hereby advise the people of Zimbabwe that I offer myself as candidate for the office of president...I share the agony and anguish of all citizens over the extreme hardships that we all have endured for nearly 10 years now...I also share the widely held view that these hardships are a result of failure of national leadership and that change at that level is a pre-requisite for change at other levels of national endeavour."

— Makoni,

Makoni said that he would have liked to run as ZANU-PF's candidate, but since he could not, he was running as an independent. He later said that his conclusion that political change was necessary was not the result of a "St.-Paul-on-the-road-to-Damascus awakening. This has been a continuum, incremental, things have been building up."

== Campaigning ==
Running under the slogan "Let's Get Zimbabwe Working Again", Makoni's theme was Dawn, and this name was given to the organisation supporting his campaign, Mavambo/Kusile/Dawn. He adopted the yellow as his campaign colour. The colour represents gold and the wealth of Zimbabwe, reinforcing his focus on solutions to the current economic crisis. The colour also represents the rising sun and the dawn of a new Zimbabwe, anchored in the hopes and aspirations of Zimbabweans for a brighter future. His campaign logo appeared very similar to that of United States presidential candidate Barack Obama's.

Joseph Chinotimba, a notorious war veteran who led the violent invasions of white owned farms in 2000, threatened Makoni with violence following the announcement of his candidature. A leading figure in ZANU-PF, Emmerson Mnangagwa, told ZBC TV that by choosing to stand for a position when the party had already chosen someone to stand for that position, Makoni had expelled himself from the party. The Herald newspaper denounced Makoni as being a pawn of the United Kingdom whose candidacy was being used in hopes of splitting the ZANU-PF vote so that Morgan Tsvangirai of the Movement for Democratic Change (MDC) could win the election.

Speaking on 7 February, Makoni denied claims that he was a Western pawn or that he was being used by ZANU-PF itself to split the opposition vote. He also said that the ZANU-PF constitution did not provide for self-expulsion and that still considered himself a member of ZANU-PF until and unless he is expelled from the party through due process. Referring to support he claims to have inside ZANU-PF, he urged these supporters to "remain steadfast and not be intimidated". ZANU-PF spokesman Nathan Shamuyarira subsequently sought to clarify the matter by saying that Makoni was expelled from the party, in accordance with party rules providing for the expulsion of a member who challenges a designated ZANU-PF candidate in an election, and he said that anyone who supported Makoni would be expelled as well. Morgan Tsvangirai said on 11 February that Makoni was merely "old wine in a new bottle" and that he would not ally with Makoni for the election.

Mugabe spoke about Makoni's candidacy for the first time on 21 February, describing it as "absolutely disgraceful", comparing Makoni to a prostitute, and criticizing Makoni for what he considered a self-important attitude.

== Endorsements ==
On 15 February, Arthur Mutambara, the leader of another MDC faction not led by Tsvangirai, said that he would not run for president and that his faction would instead back Makoni.

At the opening of Makoni's campaign on 29 February, former Interior Minister Dumiso Dabengwa and former Speaker of Parliament Cyril Ndebele were present to support him. Also present at White City hall where Makoni launched his campaign was Edgar Tekere who vowed to de-campaign Mugabe until election time.

== Result ==
Simba Makoni received 8.3% of the vote in the first round.

== See also ==
- Simba Makoni
- Arthur Mutambara
- Morgan Tsvangirai
