= 2007 Welwyn Hatfield Borough Council election =

2007 UK local government election

Results of the 2007 Welwyn Hatfield Borough Council election

The 2007 Welwyn Hatfield Borough Council election took place on 3 May 2007 to elect members of Welwyn Hatfield Borough Council in Hertfordshire, England. One third of the council was up for election and the Conservative Party stayed in overall control of the council.

After the election, the composition of the council was:

- Conservative 35
- Labour 10
- Liberal Democrat 3

== Election result ==
The results saw the Conservatives increase their majority after gaining 3 seats, which they described as an endorsement of their record in control of the council. They gained 2 seats from Labour in Haldens and Hatfield South wards, while the Liberal Democrats failed to pick up any seats. The third Conservative gain came in Howlands ward, where they defeated Green councillor Jill Weston, who had defected from Labour in 2004. Overall turnout in the election was 33.03%, while dropping as low as 24% in some wards.

Among the Conservative winners in the election were Hannah Berry and Paul Smith, who became the youngest councillors in the council's history at the ages of 18 and 20 respectively, after a recent change in the law had permitted under 21s to stand for election.

Welwyn Hatfield local election result 2007
Party	Seats	Gains	Losses	Net gain/loss	Seats %	Votes %	Votes	+/−
Conservative	13	3	0	+3	81.3	54.6	12,161	-1.2%
Labour	3	0	2	-2	18.8	25.1	5,592	+2.6%
Liberal Democrats	0	0	0	0	0	16.7	3,729	-4.4%
Green	0	0	1	-1	0	3.6	805	+3.0%

One Conservative candidate was unopposed in the election.

== Ward results ==
Brookmans Park & Little Heath
Party	Candidate	Votes	%	±%
Conservative	Stephen Boulton	1,471	81.4	+1.0
Liberal Democrats	Jenny Blumsom	125	6.9	−7.2
Green	Kevin Pressland	114	6.3	+6.3
Labour	Cathy Watson	98	5.4	−0.1
Majority		1,346	74.5	+8.2
Turnout		1,808	40.4	−5.1
Conservative hold		Swing		

Haldens
Party	Candidate	Votes	%	±%
Conservative	Jon Beckerman	693	46.4	+4.7
Labour	Mike Larkins	578	38.7	+4.9
Liberal Democrats	Louise Lotz	224	15.0	−9.5
Majority		115	7.7	−0.2
Turnout		1,495	33.9	−1.6
Conservative gain from Labour		Swing		

Handside
Party	Candidate	Votes	%	±%
Conservative	Helen Bromley	1,194	48.7	+4.6
Liberal Democrats	Malcolm Cowan	1,044	42.6	−2.4
Labour	Sheila Jones	213	8.7	−2.2
Majority		150	6.1	
Turnout		2,451	49.0	−1.0
Conservative hold		Swing		

Hatfield Central
Party	Candidate	Votes	%	±%
Labour	Maureen Cook	477	38.7	−2.4
Conservative	Doug Berry	461	37.4	+3.9
Liberal Democrats	Simon Archer	294	23.9	−1.5
Majority		16	1.3	−6.3
Turnout		1,232	29.4	−2.0
Labour hold		Swing		

Hatfield East
Party	Candidate	Votes	%	±%
Conservative	Mick Long	725	57.0	+0.9
Labour	Constance Elliott	322	25.3	+3.4
Liberal Democrats	Lis Meyland-Smith	225	17.7	−4.3
Majority		403	31.7	−2.4
Turnout		1,272	28.8	−8.3
Conservative hold		Swing		

Hatfield North
Party	Candidate	Votes	%	±%
Conservative	Howard Morgan	920	56.2	+1.1
Labour	Margaret White	454	27.7	+0.4
Liberal Democrats	Neil Ross	263	16.1	−1.5
Majority		466	28.5	+0.7
Turnout		1,637	24.1	−8.3
Conservative hold		Swing		

Hatfield South
Party	Candidate	Votes	%	±%
Conservative	Paul Smith	296	43.2	+12.5
Labour	Tony Wilder	294	42.9	−7.2
Liberal Democrats	Nigel Bain	95	13.9	−5.4
Majority		2	0.3	
Turnout		685	24.5	−5.2
Conservative gain from Labour		Swing		

Hatfield West
Party	Candidate	Votes	%	±%
Conservative	Kim Morris	608	54.0	+4.3
Labour	Sheila Wilder	341	30.3	−4.6
Liberal Democrats	Sheila Archer	177	15.7	+0.3
Majority		267	23.7	+8.9
Turnout		1,126	25.8	−11.9
Conservative hold		Swing		

Hollybush
Party	Candidate	Votes	%	±%
Labour	Lynn Chesterman	733	50.5	+5.7
Conservative	Peter Knell	718	49.5	+11.7
Majority		15	1.0	−6.0
Turnout		1,451	29.7	−1.0
Labour hold		Swing		

Howlands
Party	Candidate	Votes	%	±%
Conservative	Hannah Berry	788	46.6	+0.9
Green	Jill Weston	466	27.6	+17.9
Labour	Alan Chesterman	437	25.8	−9.5
Majority		322	19.0	+8.6
Turnout		1,691	36.8	−4.3
Conservative gain from Green		Swing		

Northaw
Party	Candidate	Votes	%	±%
Conservative	John Mansfield	unopposed		
Conservative hold		Swing		

Panshanger
Party	Candidate	Votes	%	±%
Conservative	Darren Bennett	829	55.3	−1.5
Labour	Dean Milliken	416	27.7	+2.0
Liberal Democrats	Shirley Shaw	175	11.7	−5.8
Green	Liz Verlander	80	5.3	+5.3
Majority		413	27.6	−3.5
Turnout		1,500	31.4	−2.1
Conservative hold		Swing		

Peartree
Party	Candidate	Votes	%	±%
Labour	Steve Roberts	459	39.9	+3.4
Liberal Democrats	Frank Marsh	361	31.4	−4.6
Conservative	Christopher Hay	331	28.8	+1.3
Majority		98	8.5	+8.0
Turnout		1,151	24.1	−3.2
Labour hold		Swing		

Sherrards
Party	Candidate	Votes	%	±%
Conservative	John Burnapp	1,014	55.3	+0.8
Labour	Tony Crump	427	23.3	−5.0
Liberal Democrats	Jonathan Arch	249	13.6	−3.6
Green	Berenice Dowlen	145	7.9	+7.9
Majority		587	32.0	+5.8
Turnout		1,835	43.1	−4.2
Conservative hold		Swing		

Welwyn North
Party	Candidate	Votes	%	±%
Conservative	Julie Cragg	974	76.5	+4.2
Liberal Democrats	John Blackburn	185	14.5	−3.1
Labour	Bridgit Croft	114	9.0	−1.1
Majority		789	62.0	+7.3
Turnout		1,273	36.8	−2.7
Conservative hold		Swing		

Welwyn South
Party	Candidate	Votes	%	±%
Conservative	Andrew Canter	1,139	67.8	
Liberal Democrats	Ian Skidmore	312	18.6	
Labour	Julia Henderson	229	13.6	
Majority		827	49.2	
Turnout		1,680	39.4	−2.6
Conservative hold		Swing		
