= June 2008 San Francisco general election =

The June 2008 San Francisco general elections were held on June 3, 2008, in San Francisco, California. The elections included the primaries of two seats in the United States House of Representatives, one seat to the California State Senate, two seats to the California State Assembly, seats to various parties' county central committees, one seat to the San Francisco County Superior Court, two California ballot propositions, and eight San Francisco ballot measures.

A total of 173,035 votes were counted, representing 40.22% of registered voters in San Francisco.

== Superior Court ==
As no candidate had more than 50% of the votes, a runoff election was held between the two highest vote-getting candidates in the November 2008 election.

San Francisco County Superior Court Seat 12 election, June 2008
Candidate	Votes	%
Gerardo Sandoval	57,002	43.52
Thomas Mellon	56,247	42.94
Mary E. Mallen	17,152	13.09
Write-in	591	0.45
Invalid or blank votes	42,007	24.28
Total votes	173,035	100.00
Turnout	{{{votes}}}	40.22%

== Propositions ==
Note: "City" refers to the San Francisco municipal government.

=== Proposition A ===

Proposition A would allow the San Francisco Unified School District to levy a $198 tax on every parcel of property to pay for educational programs, increased salaries for teachers, teacher compensation for hard-to-work schools and subject areas, and increase teacher and classroom resources. This proposition required a two-thirds majority to pass.

Proposition A
Choice	Votes	%
For	113,999	68.98
Against	51,273	31.02
Required majority		66.67
Total	165,272	100.00
Valid votes	165,272	95.52
Invalid/blank votes	7,757	4.48
Total votes	173,029	100.00
Registered voters/turnout		40.22

=== Proposition B ===

Proposition B would increase the number of years that new City employees and certain employees of the School Board, Superior Court, and the Community College District to qualify for employer-funded retiree health benefits, establish a Retiree Health Care Trust Fund to fund such costs, and increase retirement benefits and COLAs for some employees.

Proposition B
Choice	Votes	%
For	118,729	74.05
Against	41,598	25.95
Total	160,327	100.00
Valid votes	160,327	92.66
Invalid/blank votes	12,694	7.34
Total votes	173,021	100.00
Registered voters/turnout		40.22

=== Proposition C ===

Proposition C would prohibit City employees who have committed a crime of moral turpitude involving their employment from drawing funds from the San Francisco Employees' Retirement System that came from employer contributions.

Proposition C
Choice	Votes	%
For	91,924	58.07
Against	66,379	41.93
Total	158,303	100.00
Valid votes	158,303	91.50
Invalid/blank votes	14,715	8.50
Total votes	173,018	100.00
Registered voters/turnout		40.22

=== Proposition D ===

Proposition D would make it City policy that membership of City boards and commissions reflect the contributions of persons of both genders and all races, ethnicities, sexual orientations, and types of disabilities, and urge City agencies and officials to support the nomination, appointment, and confirmation of such candidates to City boards and commissions.

Proposition D
Choice	Votes	%
For	91,642	59.00
Against	63,681	41.00
Total	155,323	100.00
Valid votes	155,323	89.77
Invalid/blank votes	17,694	10.23
Total votes	173,017	100.00
Registered voters/turnout		40.22

=== Proposition E ===

Proposition E would require the Board of Supervisors to approve mayoral appointments to the City Public Utilities Commission, and require that such candidates meet certain qualifications.

Proposition E
Choice	Votes	%
For	80,489	51.79
Against	74,916	48.21
Total	155,405	100.00
Valid votes	155,405	89.82
Invalid/blank votes	17,613	10.18
Total votes	173,018	100.00
Registered voters/turnout		40.22

=== Proposition F ===

Proposition F would require that 50% of housing units in the Candlestick Point and Hunters Point Shipyard development plans consist of affordable housing, that the Alice Griffith projects be replaced on a unit-by-unit basis, and that the Board of Supervisors reject all plans that do not include such requirements. This was submitted to the ballot to counter Proposition G below.

Proposition F
Choice	Votes	%
For	58,756	36.75
Against	101,112	63.25
Total	159,868	100.00
Valid votes	159,868	92.40
Invalid/blank votes	13,157	7.60
Total votes	173,025	100.00
Registered voters/turnout		40.22

=== Proposition G ===

Proposition G would make it city policy to encourage timely development of Candlestick Point and Hunters Point Shipyard, including a new 49ers stadium or equivalent, that the city would transfer park land for such development if replaced by new public parks elsewhere, and that 1997 Propositions D and F be repealed. This was submitted to the ballot to counter Proposition F above.

Proposition G
Choice	Votes	%
For	99,008	62.49
Against	59,423	37.51
Total	158,431	100.00
Valid votes	158,431	91.57
Invalid/blank votes	14,593	8.43
Total votes	173,024	100.00
Registered voters/turnout		40.22

=== Proposition H ===

Proposition H would prohibit City elected officials, candidates, and political action committees that they control from soliciting or accepting contributions from contractors who have a contract pending or recently approved by the official or a board on which the official sits.

Proposition H
Choice	Votes	%
For	104,012	67.16
Against	50,865	32.84
Total	154,877	100.00
Valid votes	154,877	89.52
Invalid/blank votes	18,137	10.48
Total votes	173,014	100.00
Registered voters/turnout		40.22
