= 2008 Hawaii Republican presidential caucuses =

- January 25 – February 5, 2008
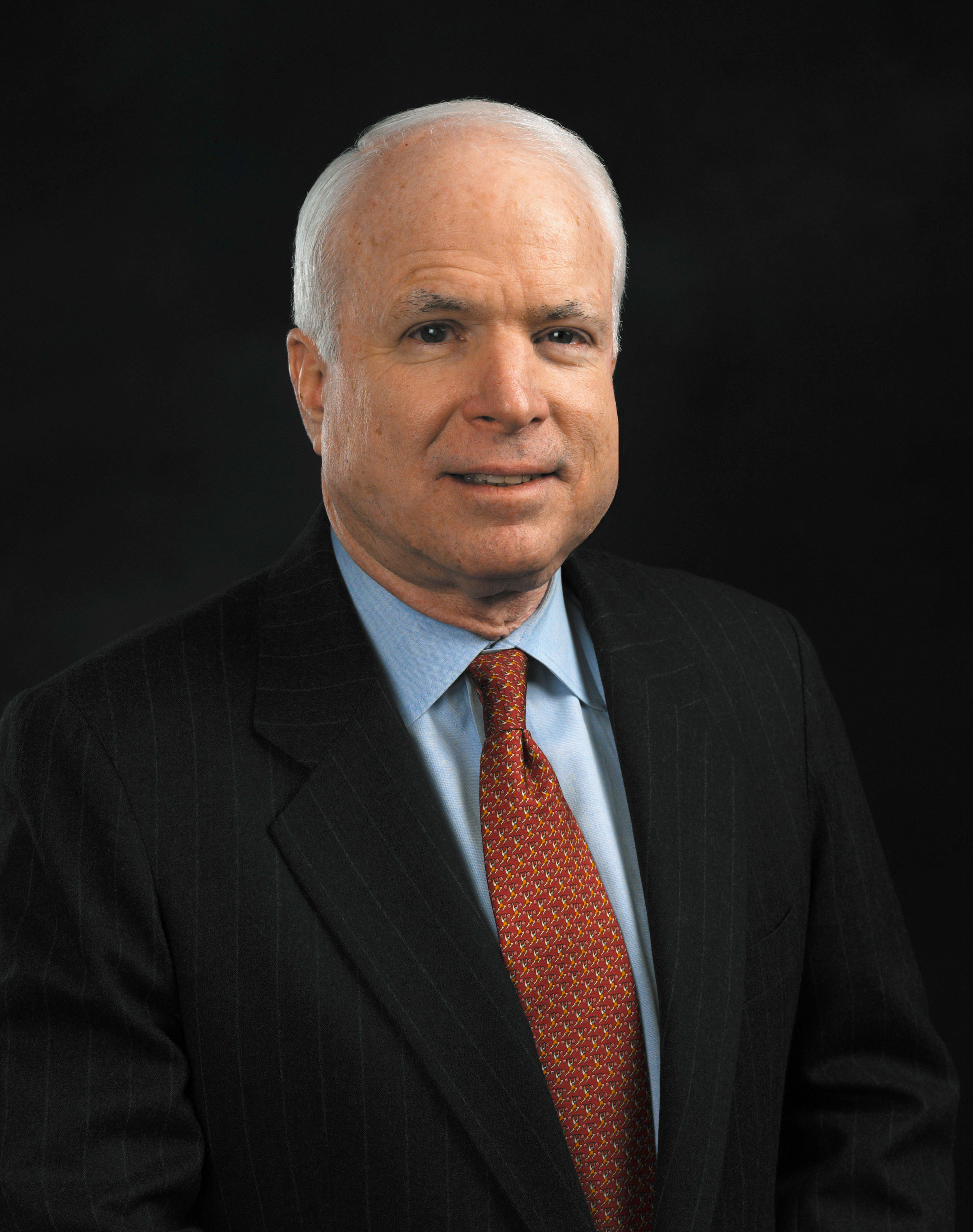

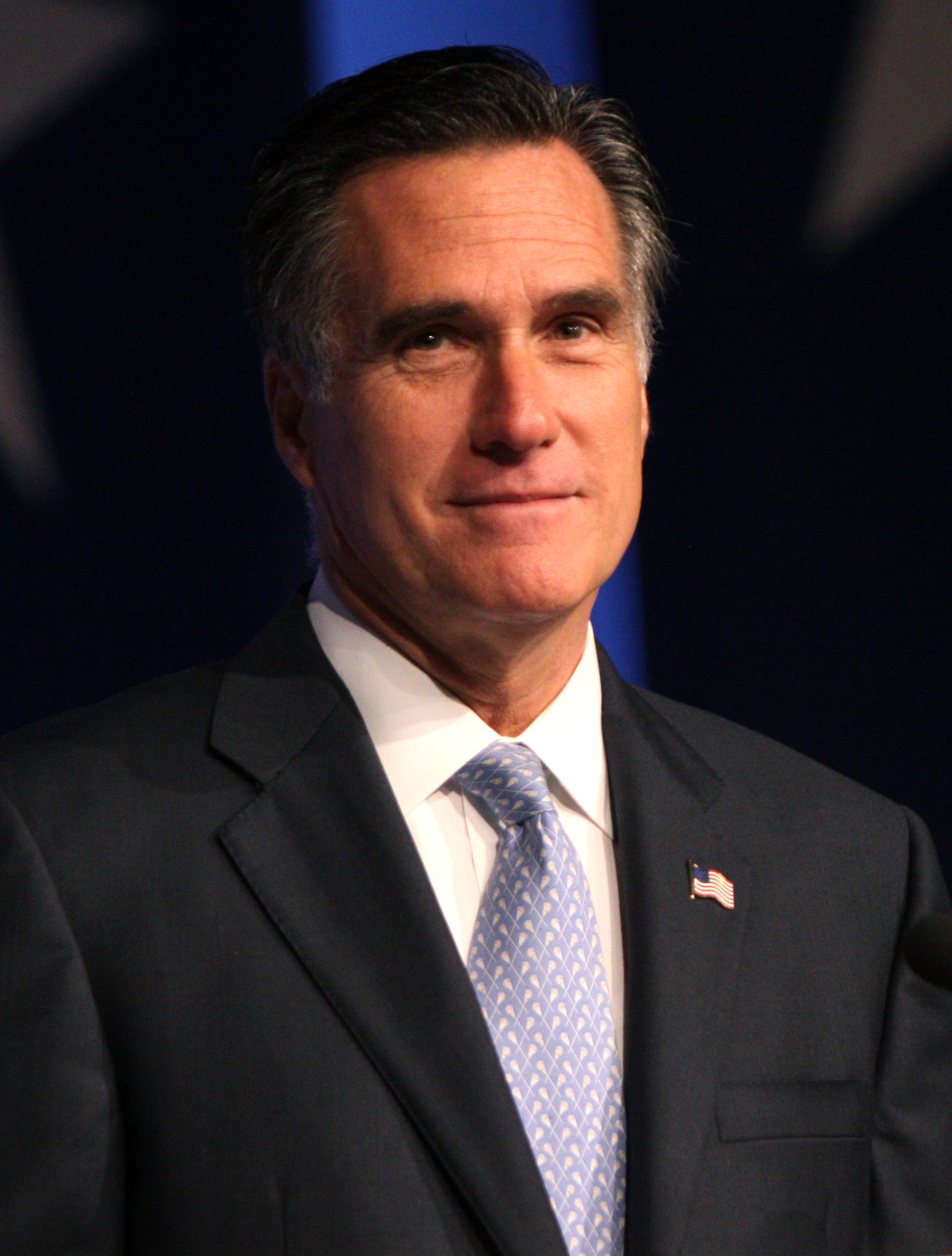
Candidate	John McCain	Mike Huckabee	Mitt Romney
Party	Republican	Republican	Republican
Home state	Arizona	Arkansas	Massachusetts
Delegate count	15	4	0
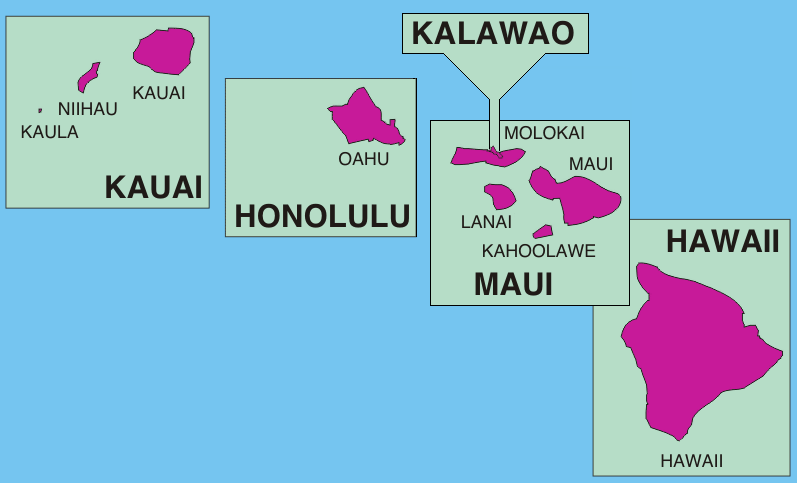
- counties of Hawaii

The 2008 Hawaii Republican presidential caucuses were held between January 25 and February 5, 2008. The caucuses chose delegates to Hawaii's Republican State Convention in May 2008, which overwhelmingly lent its support to presidential candidate John McCain.

== Process ==
The Hawaii Republican Party held its caucuses in all 51 Hawaii House of Representatives districts from January 25 to February 5. Caucus-goers selected 1,093 delegates to the Hawaii State Convention, held between May 16 and 18. These 1,093 delegates selected 19 delegates to the 2008 Republican National Convention.

Republican caucuses in Hawaii tend to be informal, taking place in parks, businesses, and homes over the course of several days. The Republican caucuses in Hawaii were closed to non-party members. None of the local delegates chosen at the caucus were committed to any candidate at the state convention. They were, however, bound to the preferences stated in the state convention in the first ballot. For this reason, Hawaiian Republican caucusgoers normally vote for convention delegates based on the delegates' personal records rather than their pledged support for a presidential candidate. However, most contenders provided slates of qualified delegates for caucusgoers to vote on.

== State convention ==
Unlike most Republican caucuses, no straw poll or presidential preference poll was taken of the attendees. Thus, no official record was provided of Hawaiian caucusgoers' preferences for President. Hawaii's delegation to the national convention, which selected the President, was chosen only at the state convention, held in Honolulu between May 16 and 18.

The convention chose seventeen national convention delegates and seventeen alternates, all of them supporters of John McCain, already the presumptive Republican nominee for President for some weeks before the state convention. Over 450 delegates from all of Hawaii's electoral districts attended the convention. They elected state committee members and chose a party platform as well as delegates to the Republican National Convention. All in all, over 600 Republicans were at the state convention.

== See also ==
- Hawaii Democratic caucuses, 2008
- Republican Party (United States) presidential primaries, 2008
