= 2008 Texas Legislature election =

2008 Texas Legislature election may refer to:

- 2008 Texas Senate election
- 2008 Texas House of Representatives election
