= 2008 Southern African Development Community emergency meeting =

Zambian President Levy Mwanawasa called an emergency meeting of SADC leaders for 12 April during the 2008 Zimbabwe presidential election to discuss the post-election impasse. According to Mwanawasa, Zimbabwe's "deepening problems" meant that the issue needed to be "dealt with at presidential level". Jacob Zuma, meanwhile, said that he thought results should have already been announced, and he described the failure to release them as "unprecedented".

== Meeting details ==
Biti said on 10 April that the MDC would not participate in a second round, reiterating the party's claim that Tsvangirai won a majority in the first round. According to the law, if one candidate in a second round withdraws, the other candidate is automatically the winner. Chinamasa was dismissive of the MDC's claim that it would not participate in a second round, saying that if the party was serious, it should formally withdraw. According to Chinamasa, the MDC wanted to avoid humiliation in a second round, which he predicted ZANU-PF would win by a large margin, and was using the threat to boycott as a "face-saving gesture".

Biti also urged SADC leaders due to meet in Zambia on 12 April to call for Mugabe's resignation, and he said that Tsvangirai would attend the SADC meeting. Matonga, the Deputy Information Minister, said initially that Mugabe would also attend the SADC meeting, although Information Minister Sikhanyiso Ndlovu said that "there is no crisis in Zimbabwe that warrants a special meeting on Zimbabwe". Soon afterwards, state radio reported that three ministers would represent Zimbabwe at the summit, rather than Mugabe himself. Matonga said the summit was called without consulting Zimbabwe. According to Matonga, Mugabe decided not to attend because he could not answer anything; as a candidate, he was unable to say what the results of the election would be or when they would be announced. Tsvangirai met with South African President Thabo Mbeki on 10 April in Johannesburg.

The MDC issued pamphlets on 11 April calling for a general strike beginning on 15 April to demand the release of results. The strike was to continue until the announcement of results. On the same day, police banned political rallies in Harare. Bvudzijena, announcing the ban, said that most policemen were occupied with guarding ballot boxes and ensuring security in the wake of the election, meaning that they were not able to handle rallies; furthermore, he said that there was no need for rallies because the election had already been held. The MDC had planned to hold a rally on 13 April. Nelson Chamisa of the MDC said: "We cannot accept a declaration of a police state. People have just voted for change, for democracy and what do they get? This is unacceptable." Assistant Police Commissioner Faustino Mazango accused the MDC of sending 350 activists to stir up violence and warned that anyone attempting to "provoke a breach of peace, whoever they are and whatever office they hold, will be dealt with severely".

Mbeki visited Harare and met with Mugabe on 12 April immediately before going to Lusaka for the SADC meeting on the same day. After he met with Mugabe, Mbeki said that there was not a crisis, emphasising that it was the responsibility of the Electoral Commission to release results and urging patience in waiting for the results. At the summit, Zimbabwe was to be represented by Mnangagwa, Chinamasa, Foreign Minister Simbarashe Mumbengegwi, and Foreign Affairs Permanent Secretary Joey Bimha. Mugabe, for his part, said that his decision not to attend the summit was not a snub: "We are very good friends and very good brothers. Sometimes you attend, sometimes you have other things holding you back."

Regarding Mbeki's statement that the situation in Zimbabwe was not a crisis, Tsvangirai said that "such a misrepresentation creates the perception of quiet approval which I think is quite shocking", and he indicated that Mbeki had expressed a different view when the two had met privately. MDC Secretary for International Affairs Elphas Mukonoweshuro was overtly hostile in his reaction to Mbeki's statement, wondering if Mbeki had been drunk at the time.

=== After the SADC meeting ===
Despite the absence of Mugabe, the 13-hour SADC meeting in Lusaka lasted well into the night. Tsvangirai attended the meeting, and he and Biti were broadly happy with the outcome. Zambian Foreign Minister Kabinga Pande, reading a joint statement, said that "the summit urged the electoral authorities in Zimbabwe that verification and release of results are expeditiously done in accordance with the due process of law" and that it "also urged all the parties in the electoral process in Zimbabwe to accept the results when they are announced." The summit also urged the government "to ensure that the run-off elections are held in a secure environment". The regional leaders also called on Mbeki to continue his mission as chief mediator between Zanu-PF and the MDC; Biti urged Mbeki to deal more aggressively with Mugabe in the future. The joint statement included no criticism of Mugabe or any mention of him at all.

Youth Absolom Sikhosana called on the youth to vote for Mugabe. He said that many people in the first round "voted with their stomachs", hoping Tsvangirai could bring economy recovery, but according to Sikhosana "the same foreign interests who are promising an overnight turnaround in the event of a Tsvangirai presidency are the same who have destroyed the economy". Sikhosana said that, while Tsvangirai promised employment, Mugabe was offering more: "he is giving the youth the opportunity to own the means of production" and "have full charge of their environment and control their resources", which Sikhosana described as a prerequisite for national wealth. In The Herald on the same day, ZANU-PF spokesman Nathan Shamuyarira denied the existence of any plan to kill Tsvangirai, saying that it had "no foundation whatsoever except in his own dreams". Similarly, Matonga said that the claim of an assassination plot was "stupid". US Ambassador James McGee called on Tsvangirai to return, noting his security concerns but saying that "as a strong leader, he should be back showing his people that he cares every bit as much for them as they do for him."

Also on 20 May, in response to Chinamasa's proposal in the previous week to establish joint ZANU-PF/MDC committees to bring an end to the violence, Chamisa said that the MDC was willing to participate in these committees, but he nevertheless strongly criticised ZANU-PF. He said that ZANU-PF had made this offer only due to international pressure, that the violence was ongoing (by this point the MDC placed the death toll at 43), as part of a "grand plan to rig the elections" by attacking MDC supporters and displacing them from their constituencies, and he doubted that ZANU-PF would stop.

MDC MP Ian Kay was arrested on 20 May for alleged responsibility for violence in Mashonaland East, while another MDC MP, Amos Chibaya was arrested on 21 May for allegedly inciting junior officers in the police to rebel.
