= 2008 Baton Rouge mayoral election =

- October 4, 2008
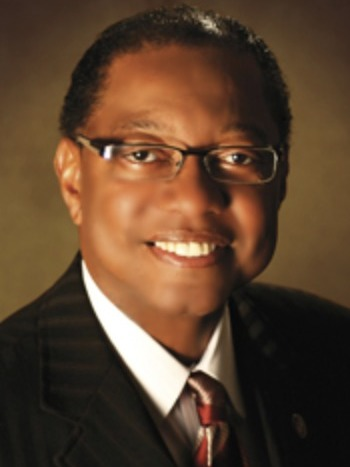

Candidate	Kip Holden	Dan Kyle
Party	Democratic	Republican
Popular vote	75,450	12,886
Percentage	71.18%	12.16%
Candidate	Wayne Carter	Ron Johnson
Party	Republican	Democratic
Popular vote	11,341	6,320
Percentage	10.7%	5.96%
Mayor before election
Kip Holden
Democratic
Elected mayor
Kip Holden
Democratic

The 2008 Baton Rouge mayoral election was held on October 4, 2008, to elect the mayor-president of Baton Rouge, Louisiana. It saw the reelection of incumbent mayor-president Kip Holden. Since Holden won an outright majority in the first round, no runoff was necessitated.

== Results ==
Results
Party	Candidate	Votes	%
Democratic	Kip Holden (incumbent)	75,450	71.18
Republican	Dan Kyle	12,886	12.16
Republican	Wayne Carter	11,341	10.7
Democratic	Ron Johnson	6,320	5.96
Total votes		105,997	
