= 2008 Austrian legislative election issue questionnaires =

Three different organisations sent questionnaires to the parties competing in the 2008 legislative elections in Austria, seeking answers to various policy questions; the questions and answers are set out in this article.

== Wahlkabine ==
The internet platform wahlkabine.at (Wahlkabine means "voting booth"), which has offered a decision support for state elections, national elections and European Parliament elections in Austria since 2002, sent a questionnaire consisting of twenty-six questions on political positions to the SPÖ, the ÖVP, the Greens, the FPÖ, the BZÖ, the LIF, the FRITZ and the KPÖ; all parties except for the FRITZ replied with their answers (shown in the following table).

Question	SPÖ	ÖVP	GRÜNE	FPÖ	BZÖ	LIF	FRITZ	KPÖ
1. Should wealth be taxed more in Austria for the fight against poverty?	++	–	+++	––	––	+++	Ø	+++
2. Should fathers receive complete compensatory wage increases (Lohnausgleich) if they stay at home for one month following the birth of their child?	++	–	+++	––	––	+	Ø	––
3. Should delinquent people who do not have Austrian citizenship be deported irrespective of their prior length of stay?	––	–	–––	+++	+++	––	Ø	–––
4. Should the Austrian Armed Forces with their universal conscription be transformed into a professional army based on volunteers?	––	––	––	––	++	+++	Ø	––
5. Should university tuition fees once more be abolished?	+++	––	+++	++	–	+++	Ø	+++
6. Should a general basic income be introduced in Austria?	––	––	+++	–––	––	+++	Ø	+++
7. Should important decisions on the EU (such as the accession of Turkey to the European Union, the Reform Treaty, ...) be subject to a referendum in Austria, even if there is no referendum in the whole European Union?	+++	+	++	+++	+++	–––	Ø	+++
8. Should a comprehensive school for teenagers aged 10 to 14 (Gesamtschule) be introduced in Austria?	+++	––	++	–––	––	+++	Ø	+++
9. Should the names of sex offenders be recorded in a register and released to the public in Austria?	––	++	––	+++	+++	––	Ø	––
10. Should Austria tighten the criteria for the humanitarian right to stay (such as health, family situation, education)?	––	–	–––	+++	+++	––	Ø	–––
11. Should freight traffic on Austria's streets be reduced through a higher lorry toll?	++	+	+++	––	–	+	Ø	+++
12. Should art which is socially controversial be subsidised with government funds?	++	+	+++	––	+	+++	Ø	++
13. Should the consumption of "soft drugs" (weiche Drogen) such as hashish and marijuana be prosecuted?	+	++	–––	+++	++	–	Ø	––
14. Should the number of seats in the Austrian National Council (parliament) be reduced due to cost concerns?	–	–	–	++	+++	–	Ø	–
15. Should people with higher incomes be obliged to contribute more to the Austrian health system (for instance through an increase of the Höchstbeitragsgrundlage?	+++	––	+++	––	–––	+++	Ø	++
16. Should Austria spend public funds to procure information about so-called "tax refugees"?	+	–	+++	+	–	–	Ø	–
17. Should video surveillance of the public space (such as plazas, public buildings and transport etc.) expanded even more in Austria?	+	++	–––	++	+++	––	Ø	––
18. Should a general smoking ban be imposed in gastronomy (such as restaurants and cafés)?	++	––	++	–––	–––	–	Ø	–
19. Should education camps for delinquent juveniles be established in Austria?	––	–	–––	+	–	––	Ø	–––
20. Should Austria spend more money on development assistance?	+	+	+++	–	–––	++	Ø	++
21. Should long-term unemployed be obliged to render charitable services?	––	+	–––	––	++	––	Ø	–––
22. Should children born in Austria automatically receive the Austrian citizenship?	––	–––	+++	–––	–––	–	Ø	+++
23. Should the age of retirement be adapted automatically to the development of life expectancy to ensure the working of the pension system in the long run?	–––	++	–––	–––	–––	–	Ø	–––
24. Should the possibility of termination of pregnancy through health insurance certificate (Krankenschein) be offered in Austria?	–	–	+	–––	––	++	Ø	+++
25. Should homosexual couples be able to adopt children in Austria?	–	–––	++	–––	–––	++	Ø	++
26. Should private transport be relieved through a reduction of the mineral oil tax?	––	–	––	+++	+++	–	Ø	–––
+++ strongly in favour ++ in favour + slightly in favour – slightly against –– against ––– strongly against Ø refused to participate

== Politikkabine ==
The internet platform politikkabine.at (Politikkabine means "politics booth") offered a similar questionnaire of twenty-six questions, to which nine of the lists contesting the election nationwide (all parties except Save Austria) replied.

Question	SPÖ	ÖVP	GRÜNE	FPÖ	BZÖ	LIF	FRITZ	KPÖ	RETTÖ	DC
1. Should child care places be offered in all of Austria free of charge for children aged 1 to 3?	–	+	+	–	+	+	+	+	Ø	–
2. Should university tuition fees be abolished?	+	–	+	+	–	+	+	+	Ø	–
3. Should the comprehensive school (Gesamtschule/Neue Mittelschule) (consolidation of Gymnasium and Hauptschule up to the ninth school year) be implemented nationwide?	+	–	+	–	–	+	+	+	Ø	–
4. Should the age of retirement be adapted automatically to the rising life expectancy and increased?	–	+	–	–	–	–	–	–	Ø	+
5. Should the state compensate rising food prices through a one-time payment (inflation bonus)?	+	–	+	–	+	–	–	+	Ø	–
6. Should home care subsidies be increased yearly according to the rate of inflation?	–	–	+	+	+	+	+	+	Ø	+
7. Do you favour a consolidation of the regional public health insurance companies (Gebietskrankenkassen)?	–	+	+	+	+	+	–	–	Ø	–
8. Should children of immigrants without sufficient knowledge of the German language be taught in separate "foreigners' classes" ("Ausländerklassen")?	–	–	–	+	–	–	–	–	Ø	+
9. Should Austria regulate immigration through a Green Card for highly trained employees?	–	–	+	+	+	+	+	–	Ø	–
10. Should penalties be imposed on states which do not accommodate a certain number of asylum seekers as agreed between the federation and the states?	–	+	+	+	–	+	–	–	Ø	–
11. Should there be a public register of sex offenders?	–	+	–	+	+	–	–	–	Ø	–
12. Should there be a tax reform even if it results in new debts for the state?	–	–	+	+	+	–	+	–	Ø	–
13. Should VAT on food be reduced?	+	–	–	+	+	–	+	+	Ø	–
14. Should the maximum tax rate be increased?	–	–	–	–	–	–	–	+	Ø	–
15. Do you favour a referendum on a new or modified EU treaty?	+	–	+	+	+	–	+	+	Ø	+
16. Should the number of seats in the National Council be reduced?	–	–	–	+	+	–	–	–	Ø	–
17. Should the positions of interior minister and/or justice minister be staffed with experts independent from political parties?	–	–	–	–	+	–	–	–	Ø	–
18. Should speed limits and driving bans be imposed in areas afflicted by high fine particulate air pollution?	+	+	+	–	–	+	+	+	Ø	+
19. Should politics intervene regulatively in the price of sale of petrol and diesel?	+	+	–	+	+	–	+	+	Ø	–
20. Do you favour the option of termination of pregnancy through health insurance certificate (Krankenschein)?	–	–	+	–	–	+	+	+	Ø	–
21. Should homosexual couples be allowed to marry in a civil ceremony?	+	–	+	–	–	+	+	+	Ø	–
22. Do you favour positive discrimination (such as conscious preference for women or disabled people) in the job market to facilitate equal job opportunities?	+	+	+	–	–	+	+	+	Ø	–
23. Should there be a smoking ban in public venues?	+	–	+	–	–	–	+	–	Ø	+
24. Should the EU cease accession negotiations with Turkey?	–	–	–	+	+	–	+	–	Ø	+
25. Should Austria continue to take part with soldiers in EU missions?	+	+	+	+	–	+	+	–	Ø	+
26. Should Austria withdraw from the EU?	–	–	–	–	–	–	–	–	Ø	–
+ in favour – against Ø refused to participate

== Wiener Zeitung ==
The Wiener Zeitung had a similar service called Wahlmaschine ("election machine"); all parties replied with their answers to the thirty questions.

Question	SPÖ	ÖVP	GRÜNE	FPÖ	BZÖ	LIF	FRITZ	KPÖ	RETTÖ	DC
1. Every party represented in the National Council is a potential coalition partner.	––	++	––	++	++	––	o	––	––	++
2. There is a lack of sufficient measures against capitalism in Austria.	––	––	++	o	++	––	++	++	++	++
3. The economy in Austria is hindered by too much regulation.	––	++	o	++	o	++	++	––	++	++
4. A possible tax relief should come into force on 1 January 2009.	++	––	++	++	++	++	++	++	++	++
5. A capital gains tax should be introduced.	++	––	++	––	––	++	++	++	––	––
6. Higher earners should profit from tax reform, as well.	––	++	++	++	––	++	++	––	o	++
7. Federalism is too expensive in Austria.	––	o	o	––	o	++	––	++	++	––
8. The states of Austria should levy taxes for all their expenses by themselves.	––	––	o	––	++	o	––	––	++	o
9. The rich do not pay enough taxes in Austria.	++	––	++	++	++	++	++	++	++	o
10. An unconditional basic income for all should be introduced.	––	––	o	––	––	++	o	++	o	––
11. Only those who have demonstrated their willingness to work should receive a basic income.	++	++	––	––	––	––	++	––	++	––
12. Homosexual couples should be able to marry at the civil registry office.	++	––	++	––	––	++	o	++	––	––
13. There should be a widow's/widower's pension for homosexual couples, as well.	++	++	++	––	––	++	––	++	––	––
14. Homosexual couples should be allowed to adopt children.	++	––	++	––	––	++	––	++	––	––
15. A constitutional law should provide for a binding referendum on the accession of Turkey to the European Union.	++	o	o	++	++	––	++	––	++	++
16. A constitutional law should provide for binding referendums before every new EU treaty.	++	––	––	++	++	––	o	++	++	++
17. Altogether Austria profits from the fact that we joined the EU.	++	++	++	––	––	++	++	––	––	o
18. Instead of the motorway permit sticker a kilometre-dependent car toll should be introduced.	––	––	++	––	––	++	++	++	o	++
19. Nonsmoker protection should be strengthened even more.	++	o	++	o	––	o	++	––	––	++
20. People who consciously live unhealthfully should contribute more to the financing of the healthcare system.	––	o	––	––	––	++	––	––	++	++
21. Kindergarten attendance should be compulsory after the fifth year of life.	++	++	++	––	++	++	++	++	++	––
22. The federation, the states, municipalities, chambers and the ORF should commit themselves to an absolute stop to increases of fees for two years.	––	o	++	++	++	++	++	++	++	o
23. When prices rise to unprecedented levels, that state should intervene.	++	++	++	++	++	––	++	++	o	––
24. University tuition fees have to be abolished.	++	––	++	++	––	++	++	++	o	––
25. The comprehensive school for teenagers aged 10 to 14 (Gesamtschule) should be introduced nationwide and compulsorily.	++	––	++	––	––	++	++	++	++	––
26. Under-performing civil servants should not be protected from being sacked.	––	––	o	++	++	++	––	––	––	o
27. Foreigners who have been handed unconditional sentences should be deported immediately.	––	o	––	++	++	––	++	––	++	o
28. People who live here legally should be allowed to work, as well.	++	o	++	––	––	++	++	++	++	o
29. Asylum seekers should have to wait in camps for the decisions on their asylum requests.	––	––	––	++	++	––	o	––	––	o
30. As the life expectancy grows, so should the age of retirement be postponed.	––	o	––	––	––	++	––	––	o	++
++ in favour + rather in favour o neutral – rather against –– against
