= 2008 Mesa mayoral election =

Mesa mayoral election, 2008
- May 20, 2008
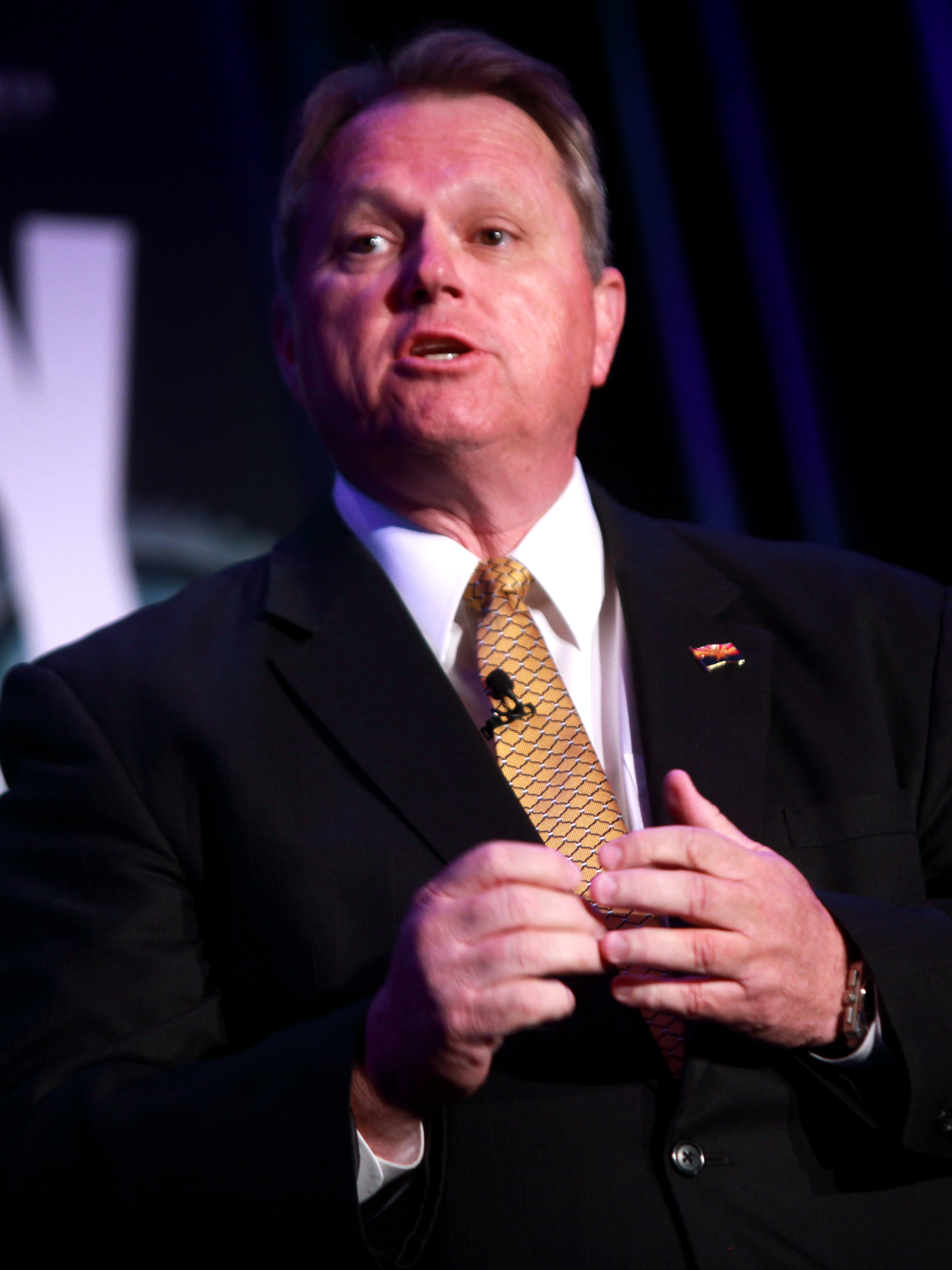

Candidate	Scott Smith	Rex Griswold
Party	Nonpartisan	Nonpartisan
Popular vote	27,171	21,379
Percentage	55.83%	43.93%
Mayor before election
Keno Hawker
Elected mayor
Scott Smith
Republican

The 2008 Mesa mayoral election was held on May 20, 2008, to elect the mayor of Mesa, Arizona. It saw the election of Scott Smith.

Incumbent mayor Keno Hawker was term limited.

== Results ==
=== Primary ===
The primary was held March 11, 2008.

Primary election results
Candidate	Votes	%
Scott Smith	18,236	38.72
Rex Griswold	15,633	33.19
Claudia Walters	13,060	27.73
Ilias Kostopoulous (write-in)	3	0.01
Other write-ins	169	0.36
Total votes	47,101	

=== General election ===
General election result
Candidate	Votes	%
Scott Smith	27,171	55.83
Rex Griswold	21,379	43.93
Write-in	119	0.25
Total votes	48,669	

== See also ==
- List of mayors of Mesa, Arizona
