= 2008 Washington State Judicial election =

Elected judicial positions in Washington State are nonpartisan; in 1912, Washington voters amended the constitution, adopting nonpartisan elections as the way to select judges.

== Court of Appeals ==
Court of Appeals, Division I, District King Judge Position 5 - Linda Lau (NP)

Court of Appeals, Division I, District King Judge Position 6 - Ann Schindler (NP)

Court of Appeals, Division I, District Snohomish* Judge Position 2 - J. Robert Leach (NP)

Court of Appeals, Division II, Pierce Judge Position 2 - Elaine Houghton (NP)

Court of Appeals, Division II, Clallam, Grays Harbor, Jefferson, Kitsap, Mason, Thurston Judge Position 1 - Joyce (Robin) Hunt (NP)

Court of Appeals, Division III, Ferry, Lincoln, Okanogan, Pend Orelle, Spokane, Stevens Judge Position 2 - Kevin Korsmo (NP)

Court of Appeals, Division III, Chelan, Douglas, Kittitas, Klickitat, Yakima Judge Position 1 - Stephen M. Brown (NP)

== Superior Court ==
Asotin, Columbia, Garfield Superior Judge Position 1 - William D. (Bill) Acey (NP)

Judge Position 1 Benton, Franklin Superior Court Bruce A. Spanner (NP)

Judge Position 2 Benton, Franklin Superior Court Robert (Bob) Swisher (NP)

Judge Position 3 Benton, Franklin Superior Court Craig J. Matheson (NP)

Judge Position 4 Benton, Franklin Superior Court Cameron Mitchell (NP)

Judge Position 5 Benton, Franklin Superior Court Vic L. VanderSchoor (NP)

Judge Position 6 Benton, Franklin Superior Court Carrie Runge (NP)

Judge Position 1 Ferry, Pend Oreille, Stevens Rebecca M. Baker (NP)

Judge Position 2 Ferry, Pend Oreille, Stevens Allen C. Nielson (NP)

Judge Position 1 Klickitat, Skamania Superior Court E. Thompson Reynolds (NP)

Judge Position 1 Pacific, Wahkiakum Superior Court Michael J. Sullivan (NP)

Judge Position 1 Adams Superior Court Richard W. Miller (NP)

Judge Position 1 Chelan Superior Court Lesley A. Allan (NP)

Judge Position 2 Chelan Superior Court Ted W. Small (NP)

Judge Position 3 Chelan Superior Court John E. Bridges (NP)

Judge Position 1 Clallam Superior Court Kenneth D. Williams (NP)

Judge Position 2 Clallam Superior Court George L. Wood (NP)

Judge Position 3 Clallam Superior Court Brooke Taylor (NP)

Judge Position 1 Clark Superior Court Roger A. Bennett (NP)

Judge Position 2 Clark Superior Court John P. Wulle (NP)

Judge Position 3 Clark Superior Court John F. Nichols (NP)

Judge Position 4 Clark Superior Court Edwin L. Poyfair (NP)

Judge Position 5 Clark Superior Court Robert L. Harris (NP)

Judge Position 6 Clark Superior Court Barbara D. Johnson (NP)

Judge Position 7 Clark Superior Court James E. Rulli (NP)

Judge Position 8 Clark Superior Court Diane Woolard (NP)

Judge Position 9 Clark Superior Court Robert Lewis (NP)

Judge Position 10 Clark Superior Court: new position (NP)

Judge Position 1 Cowlitz Superior Court James Edgar F. Xavier Warme (NP)

Judge Position 2 Cowlitz Superior Court Stephen M. Warning (NP)

Judge Position 3 Cowlitz Superior Court Jill M. Johanson (NP)

Judge Position 4 Cowlitz Superior Court Jim Stonier (NP)

Judge Position 1 Douglas Superior Court John Hotchkiss (NP)

Judge Position 1 Grant Superior Court Evan E. Sperline (NP)

Judge Position 2 Grant Superior Court Kenneth L. Jorgensen (NP)

Judge Position 3 Grant Superior Court John Antosz (NP)

Judge Position 1 Grays Harbor Superior Court Gordon Godfrey (NP)

Judge Position 2 Grays Harbor Superior Court Dave Edwards (NP)

Judge Position 3 Grays Harbor Superior Court F. Mark McCauley (NP)

Judge Position 1 Island Superior Court Alan R. Hancock (NP)

Judge Position 2 Island Superior Court Vickie Churchill (NP)

Judge Position 1 Jefferson Superior Court Craddock D Verser (NP)

Judge Position 1 King Superior Court Charles W. Mertel (NP)

Judge Position 2 King Superior Court Cheryl Carey (NP)

Judge Position 3 King Superior Court Julie A. Spector (NP)

Judge Position 4 King Superior Court Mary E. Roberts (NP)

Judge Position 5 King Superior Court Steven C. Gonzalez (NP)

Judge Position 6 King Superior Court Philip G. Hubbard Jr (NP)

Judge Position 7 King Superior Court Kim Prochnau (NP)

Judge Position 8 King Superior Court Jay V. White (NP)

Judge Position 9 King Superior Court Jeffrey M. Ramsdell (NP)

Judge Position 10 King Superior Court Glenna Hall (NP)

Judge Position 11 King Superior Court Catherine Shaffer (NP)

Judge Position 12 King Superior Court Dean S. Lum (NP)

Judge Position 13 King Superior Court Terence Lukens (NP)

Judge Position 14 King Superior Court Brian D. Gain (NP)

Judge Position 15 King Superior Court Mary Yu (NP)

Judge Position 16 King Superior Court Michael Hayden (NP)

Judge Position 17 King Superior Court Donald D. Haley (NP)

Judge Position 18 King Superior Court Susan J. Craighead (NP)

Judge Position 19 King Superior Court Harry J. McCarthy (NP)

Judge Position 20 King Superior Court Michael J. Heavy (NP)

Judge Position 21 King Superior Court Greg Canova (NP)

Judge Position 22 King Superior Court Douglas McBroom (NP)

Judge Position 23 King Superior Court Andrea Darvas (NP)

Judge Position 24 King Superior Court Michael J. Fox (NP)

Judge Position 25 King Superior Court James A. Doerty (NP)

Judge Position 26 King Superior Court Laura Middaugh (NP)

Judge Position 27 King Superior Court Joan DuBuque (NP)

Judge Position 28 King Superior Court Carol A. Schapira (NP)

Judge Position 29 King Superior Court Sharon S. Armstrong (NP)

Judge Position 30 King Superior Court Douglass North (NP)

Judge Position 31 King Superior Court Helen Halpert (NP)

Judge Position 32 King Superior Court LeRoy McCullough (NP)

Judge Position 33 King Superior Court Richard D. Eadie (NP)

Judge Position 34 King Superior Court Michael Trickey (NP)

Judge Position 35 King Superior Court Paris K. Kallas (NP)

Judge Position 36 King Superior Court George T. Mattson (NP)

Judge Position 37 King Superior Court Nicole MacInnes (NP)

Judge Position 38 King Superior Court Richard McDermott, Jr. (NP)

Judge Position 39 King Superior Court Patricia Clark (NP)

Judge Position 40 King Superior Court Bruce W. Hilyer (NP)

Judge Position 41 King Superior Court Palmer Robinson (NP)

Judge Position 42 King Superior Court Chris Washington (NP)

Judge Position 43 King Superior Court William L. Downing (NP)

Judge Position 44 King Superior Court Ronald Kessler (NP)

Judge Position 45 King Superior Court Jim Rogers (NP)

Judge Position 46 King Superior Court Suzanne M. Barnett (NP)

Judge Position 47 King Superior Court Deborah Fleck (NP)

Judge Position 48 King Superior Court Laura Inveen (NP)

Judge Position 49 King Superior Court Monica J. Benton (NP)

Judge Position 50 King Superior Court James D. Cayce (NP)

Judge Position 51 King Superior Court John Erlick (NP)

Judge Position 52 King Superior Court Bruce E. Heller (NP)

Judge Position 1 Kitsap Superior Court Leonard W. Costello (NP)

Judge Position 2 Kitsap Superior Court Leila Mills (NP)

Judge Position 3 Kitsap Superior Court Anna Laurie (NP)

Judge Position 4 Kitsap Superior Court Theodore Spearman (NP)

Judge Position 5 Kitsap Superior Court Jay B. Roof (NP)

Judge Position 6 Kitsap Superior Court Russell W. Hartman (NP)

Judge Position 7 Kitsap Superior Court M. Karlynn Haberly (NP)

Judge Position 8 Kitsap Superior Court Sally Olsen (NP)

Judge Position 1 Kittitas Superior Court Michael E. Cooper (NP)

Judge Position 2 Kittitas Superior Court Scott Sparks (NP)

Judge Position 1 Lewis Superior Court Nelson E. Hunt (NP)

Judge Position 2 Lewis Superior Court Jim Lawler (NP)

Judge Position 3 Lewis Superior Court Richard L. Brosey (NP)

Judge Position 1 Lincoln Superior Court Philip W. Borst (NP)

Judge Position 1 Mason Superior Court James B. Sawyer II (NP)

Judge Position 2 Mason Superior Court Toni A. Sheldon (NP)

Judge Position 1 Okanogan Superior Court Jack Burchard (NP)

Judge Position 1 Pierce Superior Court Jim Orlando (NP)

Judge Position 2 Pierce Superior Court Katherine Stolz (NP)

Judge Position 3 Pierce Superior Court Thomas P. Larkin (NP)

Judge Position 4 Pierce Superior Court Bryan E. Chushcoff (NP)

Judge Position 5 Pierce Superior Court Vicki L. Hogan (NP)

Judge Position 6 Pierce Superior Court Rosanne Buckner (NP)

Judge Position 7 Pierce Superior Court Frederick W. Fleming (NP)

Judge Position 8 Pierce Superior Court Brian Tollefson (NP)

Judge Position 9 Pierce Superior Court Sergio Armijo (NP)

Judge Position 10 Pierce Superior Court D. Gary Steiner (NP)

Judge Position 11 Pierce Superior Court John A. McCarthy (NP)

Judge Position 12 Pierce Superior Court Stephanie A. Arend (NP)

Judge Position 13 Pierce Superior Court Kathryn Nelson (NP)

Judge Position 14 Pierce Superior Court Susan Serko (NP)

Judge Position 15 Pierce Superior Court Thomas Felnagle (NP)

Judge Position 16 Pierce Superior Court Lisa Worswick (NP)

Judge Position 17 Pierce Superior Court Ronald Culpepper (NP)

Judge Position 18 Pierce Superior Court Beverly G. Grant (NP)

Judge Position 19 Pierce Superior Court Linda Lee (NP)

Judge Position 20 Pierce Superior Court Kitty-Ann van Doorninck (NP)

Judge Position 21 Pierce Superior Court Frank E. Cuthbertson (NP)

Judge Position 22 Pierce Superior Court John Hickman (NP)

Judge Position 1 Skagit Superior Court John M. Meyer (NP)

Judge Position 2 Skagit Superior Court Michael E. Rickert (NP)

Judge Position 3 Skagit Superior Court Susan K. Cook (NP)

Judge Position 4 Skagit Superior Court David Needy (NP)

Judge Position 1 San Juan Superior Court John O. Linde (NP)

Judge Position 1 Snohomish Superior Court Ronald L. Castleberry (NP)

Judge Position 2 Snohomish Superior Court James H. Allendoerfer (NP)

Judge Position 3 Snohomish Superior Court Thomas J. Wynne (NP)

Judge Position 4 Snohomish Superior Court Linda C. Krese (NP)

Judge Position 5 Snohomish Superior Court Gerald L. Knight (NP)

Judge Position 6 Snohomish Superior Court Richard J. Thorpe (NP)

Judge Position 7 Snohomish Superior Court George N. Bowden (NP)

Judge Position 8 Snohomish Superior Court Eric Lucas (NP)

Judge Position 10 Snohomish Superior Court Kenneth L. Cowsert (NP)

Judge Position 11 Snohomish Superior Court Larry E. McKeeman (NP)

Judge Position 12 Snohomish Superior Court Anita L. Farris (NP)

Judge Position 13 Snohomish Superior Court Michael Downes (NP)

Judge Position 14 Snohomish Superior Court Ellen Fair (NP)

Judge Position 15 Snohomish Superior Court Bruce Weiss (NP)

Judge Position 1 Spokane Superior Court Robert D. Austin (NP)

Judge Position 2 Spokane Superior Court Neal Q. Rielly (NP)

Judge Position 3 Spokane Superior Court Tari S. Eitzen (NP)

Judge Position 4 Spokane Superior Court Kathleen M. O'Connor (NP)

Judge Position 5 Spokane Superior Court Michael P. Price (NP)

Judge Position 6 Spokane Superior Court Salvatore (Sam) Cozza (NP)

Judge Position 7 Spokane Superior Court Maryann C. Moreno (NP)

Judge Position 8 Spokane Superior Court Harold D. Clarke (NP)

Judge Position 9 Spokane Superior Court Jerome J. Leveque (NP)

Judge Position 10 Spokane Superior Court Linda G. Tompkins (NP)

Judge Position 11 Spokane Superior Court Greg D. Sypolt (NP)

Judge Position 12 Spokane Superior Court Ellen Kalama Clark (NP)

Judge Position 1 Thurston Superior Court H. Christopher Wickham (NP)

Judge Position 2 Thurston Superior Court Paula Casey (NP)

Judge Position 3 Thurston Superior Court Richard A. Strophy (NP)

Judge Position 4 Thurston Superior Court Wm. Thomas McPhee (NP)

Judge Position 5 Thurston Superior Court Richard D. Hicks (NP)

Judge Position 6 Thurston Superior Court Christine A. Pomeroy (NP)

Judge Position 7 Thurston Superior Court Gary Tabor (NP)

Judge Position 8 Thurston Superior Court Anne Hirsch (NP)

Judge Position 1 Walla Walla Superior Court Robert L. Zagelow (NP)

Judge Position 2 Walla Walla Superior Court Donald Schacht (NP)

Judge Position 1 Whatcom Superior Court Ira Uhrig (NP)

Judge Position 2 Whatcom Superior Court Steven J. Mura (NP)

Judge Position 3 Whatcom Superior Court Charles R. Snyder (NP)

Judge Position 1 Whitman Superior Court David Frazier (NP)

Judge Position 1 Yakima Superior Court Susan L. Hahn (NP)

Judge Position 2 Yakima Superior Court Michael G. McCarthy (NP)

Judge Position 3 Yakima Superior Court F. James Gavin (NP)

Judge Position 4 Yakima Superior Court Blaine Gibson (NP)

Judge Position 5 Yakima Superior Court Robert N. Hackett Jr. (NP)

Judge Position 6 Yakima Superior Court Ruth Reukauf (NP)

Judge Position 7 Yakima Superior Court Michael E. Schwab (NP)

Judge Position 8 Yakima Superior Court James C. Lust (NP)
