= 2008 Puerto Rico Democratic presidential primary =

- June 1, 2008

Nominee	Hillary Clinton	Barack Obama
Home state	New York	Illinois
Popular vote	263,120	121,458
Percentage	67.73%	31.27%
- Primary results by municipality Hillary Clinton Barack Obama

The 2008 Puerto Rico Democratic presidential primary took place on June 1, 2008. It was an open primary. Puerto Rico initially planned to hold caucuses, as was done in 2000 and 2004, on June 7, 2008. In December 2007, an error in the plan was discovered; the caucus date should have read June 1, 2008. Puerto Rico also decided to conduct a primary, rather than caucuses. Puerto Rico sent 55 pledged delegates to the 2008 Democratic National Convention. These delegates were allotted on a proportional basis. The territory's delegation also included eight unpledged "superdelegates". Puerto Rico also selected one unpledged add-on delegate. Selection of the unpledged add-on delegate occurred at the Assembly of the Democratic Party of the Commonwealth of Puerto Rico on June 21, 2008, in San Juan. Polls were open from 8:00 am to 3:00 pm, prevailing local time, Atlantic Standard Time (AST) (UTC-4, same as Eastern Daylight Time). Hillary Clinton won the primary.

The primary was the subject of a book published in 2010.

== Polls ==
In a poll conducted from March 31–April 5, 2008, Clinton led Obama by 13%, holding 50% to his 37%, with 13% undecided and a margin of error of ± 4.4%.

In a poll conducted from May 8–May 20, 2008, Clinton led Obama by 13%, holding 51% to his 38%, with 11% undecided and a margin of error of ± 3.4%.

== Superdelegate endorsements ==
Puerto Rico's superdelegates endorsed candidates before the election. Four superdelegates, Democratic State Chair Roberto Prats, Vice Chair Luisette Cabañas, Puerto Rico Democratic National Committeeman Kenneth McClintock and Young Democrats of America (YDA) National Committeeman Francisco Domenech, a majority, had announced support for Sen. Hillary Clinton and the remaining 2, Governor Aníbal Acevedo Vilá and National Committeewoman Celita Roque, had announced support for Sen. Barack Obama.

== Campaigning on the Island ==
Both Hillary Clinton and Barack Obama visited the island, campaigning to get as many votes as possible.

Both campaigns also sent surrogates. In the Obama campaign, his spouse, Michelle, travelled once to Puerto Rico. In the Clinton campaign, the candidate's daughter, Chelsea, and her spouse President Bill Clinton, both travelled twice to Puerto Rico and during one extensive campaign day, May 26, the three attended several events together in Ponce and San Juan, according to a book by Democratic State Chair Roberto Prats and Senate President Kenneth McClintock.

== Results ==
Puerto Rico Democratic presidential primary, 2008
Candidate	Votes	Percentage	Delegates
Hillary Clinton	263,120	67.73%	38
Barack Obama	121,458	31.27%	17
Pending	1,650	0.42%	0
Blank Ballots	1,071	0.28%	0
Provisional Ballot	1,178	0.30%	0
Total	388,477	100.00%	55

== See also ==
- Democratic Party (United States) presidential primaries, 2008
- Puerto Rico Republican caucuses, 2008
