= 2008 West Lancashire District Council election =

2008 UK local government election

Results of the 2008 West Lancashire Borough Council election

The 2008 West Lancashire District Council election took place on 1 May 2008 to elect members of West Lancashire District Council in Lancashire, England. One third of the council was up for election and the Conservative Party stayed in overall control of the council.

After the election, the composition of the council was:

Party	Seats	±
Conservative	35	+2
Labour	18	-2
Independent	1	0

== Campaign ==
Before the election, in which 19 seats were being contested, the Conservatives ran the council with 33 of the 52 seats. The seat in Tanhouse was being contested after the death of Labour councillor Sally Keegan in December 2007, while Conservative Martin Forshaw was unopposed in Hesketh with Becconsall. The Conservatives were strongly favoured to remain in control and were particularly targeting the last Labour held seat in Burscough.

The Conservatives campaigned on plans to regenerate Skelmersdale, build new council offices on a site in Ormskirk and a pledge to keep council tax rises as low as possible.

== Election result ==
The results saw the Conservatives increase their control of the council after making 2 gains from Labour. They gained the seats of Burscough West and Up Holland, with the margin of victory in Up Holland being only 3 votes after 2 recounts were required. Labour also only held the Tanhouse seat by 34 votes after a recount. The results meant the Conservatives had 35 seats compared to 18 for Labour and 1 independent. Overall turnout in the election was 30.51%.

The Conservative council leader, Geoff Roberts, saw the results as a sign they could take the parliamentary seat in the next general election, while Labour blamed their defeats on national issues.

West Lancashire local election result 2008
Party	Seats	Gains	Losses	Net gain/loss	Seats %	Votes %	Votes	+/−
Conservative	12	2	0	+2	63.2	54.2	11,101	+1.4
Labour	7	0	2	-2	36.8	36.8	7,543	-1.1
UKIP	0	0	0	0	0.0	4.2	857	+3.3
Green	0	0	0	0	0.0	3.1	638	-0.5
Independent	0	0	0	0	0.0	1.6	336	+0.3

== Ward results ==
=== Ashurst ===
Ashurst
Party	Candidate	Votes	%	±%
Labour	Geoff Roberts	533	51.2	−17.0
Conservative	James Coomber	302	29.0	−2.8
UKIP	Roy Green	207	19.9	+19.9
Majority		231	22.2	−14.3
Turnout		1,042	21.5	+0.4
Labour hold		Swing		

=== Aughton and Downholland ===
Aughton and Downholland
Party	Candidate	Votes	%	±%
Conservative	Una Atherley	1,073	65.0	−7.1
Labour	Julie Gibson	302	18.3	−9.6
UKIP	Jim Bevan	276	16.7	+16.7
Majority		771	46.7	+2.6
Turnout		1,651	36.7	+0.8
Conservative hold		Swing		

=== Birch Green ===
Birch Green
Party	Candidate	Votes	%	±%
Labour	Mary Pendleton	394	75.9	−5.5
Conservative	Malcolm Barron	125	24.1	+5.5
Majority		269	51.8	−11.0
Turnout		519	17.1	+0.2
Labour hold		Swing		

=== Burscough East ===
Burscough East
Party	Candidate	Votes	%	±%
Conservative	George Pratt	737	65.6	−0.6
Labour	Kate Anderson	386	34.4	+0.6
Majority		351	31.3	−1.1
Turnout		1,123	34.6	−3.4
Conservative hold		Swing		

=== Burscough West ===
Burscough West
Party	Candidate	Votes	%	±%
Conservative	Jason Grice	853	58.6	+2.7
Labour	Cynthia Dereli	602	41.4	−2.7
Majority		251	17.3	+2.5
Turnout		1,455	37.0	+0.0
Conservative gain from Labour		Swing		

=== Derby ===
Derby
Party	Candidate	Votes	%	±%
Conservative	Adrian Owens	904	61.8	+4.6
Labour	Alexander Gilmore	336	23.0	−3.5
Green	Anne Doyle	223	15.2	−1.1
Majority		568	38.8	+8.1
Turnout		1,463	29.1	−2.0
Conservative hold		Swing		

=== Digmoor ===
Digmoor
Party	Candidate	Votes	%	±%
Labour	Terence Aldridge	515	76.5	−3.3
Conservative	Graham Jones	158	23.5	+3.3
Majority		357	53.0	−6.7
Turnout		673	21.6	+0.5
Labour hold		Swing		

=== Halsall ===
Halsall
Party	Candidate	Votes	%	±%
Conservative	Doreen Stephenson	395	64.4	+9.0
Independent	David Corfield	152	24.8	−19.8
Labour	Susan Jones	66	10.8	+10.8
Majority		243	39.6	+28.8
Turnout		613	34.6	−12.4
Conservative hold		Swing		

=== Hesketh-with-Becconsall ===
Hesketh-with-Becconsall
Party	Candidate	Votes	%	±%
Conservative	Martin Forshaw	unopposed		
Conservative hold		Swing		

=== Knowsley ===
Knowsley
Party	Candidate	Votes	%	±%
Conservative	Peter Lea	1,003	63.8	+8.0
Labour	Ann Rice	357	22.7	−9.2
Green	John Watt	211	13.4	+1.0
Majority		646	41.1	+17.2
Turnout		1,571	35.4	+0.3
Conservative hold		Swing		

=== Moorside ===
Moorside
Party	Candidate	Votes	%	±%
Labour	Christopher Mawdsley	478	74.5	−5.2
Conservative	Richard Shepherd	164	25.5	+5.2
Majority		314	48.9	−10.5
Turnout		642	22.7	+0.9
Labour hold		Swing		

=== Rufford ===
Rufford
Party	Candidate	Votes	%	±%
Conservative	Joan Colling	524	84.8	+7.1
Labour	Jacqueline Citarella	94	15.2	−7.1
Majority		430	69.6	+14.2
Turnout		618	37.6	−9.7
Conservative hold		Swing		

=== Scott ===
Scott
Party	Candidate	Votes	%	±%
Conservative	Cyril Ainscough	861	55.7	+8.4
Labour	Noel Delaney	482	31.2	−3.1
Green	Maurice George	204	13.2	+2.0
Majority		379	24.5	+11.5
Turnout		1,547	34.8	−1.8
Conservative hold		Swing		

=== Skelmersdale North ===
Skelmersdale North
Party	Candidate	Votes	%	±%
Labour	Neil Furey	563	62.9	−14.4
Independent	Joan Morrison	184	20.6	+20.6
Conservative	Dave Rydings	148	16.5	−6.2
Majority		379	42.3	−12.2
Turnout		895	29.0	+1.3
Labour hold		Swing		

=== Skelmersdale South ===
Skelmersdale South
Party	Candidate	Votes	%	±%
Labour	Sydney Jones	778	66.7	−6.5
Conservative	Joanne Rushton	389	33.3	+6.5
Majority		389	33.3	−13.0
Turnout		1,167	23.3	−0.7
Labour hold		Swing		

=== Tanhouse ===
Tanhouse
Party	Candidate	Votes	%	±%
Labour	Nikki Hennessy	402	52.2	−8.3
Conservative	Cindy Miller	368	47.8	+21.4
Majority		34	4.4	−29.7
Turnout		770	22.7	+3.1
Labour hold		Swing		

=== Tarleton ===
Tarleton
Party	Candidate	Votes	%	±%
Conservative	John Mee	1,526	87.7	+18.2
Labour	Stephen Hanlon	215	12.3	+3.0
Majority		1,311	75.3	+27.1
Turnout		1,741	38.9	+2.2
Conservative hold		Swing		

=== Up Holland ===
Up Holland
Party	Candidate	Votes	%	±%
Conservative	Ruth Pollock	728	43.1	−0.4
Labour	Maggie Skilling	725	42.9	−2.2
UKIP	Marie Settle	238	14.1	+2.8
Majority		3	0.2	
Turnout		1,691	34.4	−0.3
Conservative gain from Labour		Swing		

=== Wrightington ===
Wrightington
Party	Candidate	Votes	%	±%
Conservative	Peter Gartside	843	65.1	+2.2
Labour	Pauline Bailey	315	24.3	−12.8
UKIP	Iain Routh	136	10.5	+10.5
Majority		528	40.8	+14.9
Turnout		1,294	38.8	−1.4
Conservative hold		Swing		
