= Scandalpedia =

Political website

Scandalpedia was a political website launched September 9, 2008, by the Liberal Party of Canada in response to the 2008 Canadian federal election in particular as a counter to an attack website launched by the Conservative Party of Canada. It contains "Wikipedia style" articles on controversial actions and ethical concerns raised since the Conservative Party of Canada has taken power in 2006. It features articles, quotes, and biographies of Conservative party members involved in the various controversies.

The site uses the MediaWiki monobook theme but is not editable by the public and does not appear to be based on MediaWiki software.
