= 2008 Sacramento mayoral election =

Sacramento mayoral election, 2008
- June 3, 2008 (first round); November 4, 2008 (runoff)
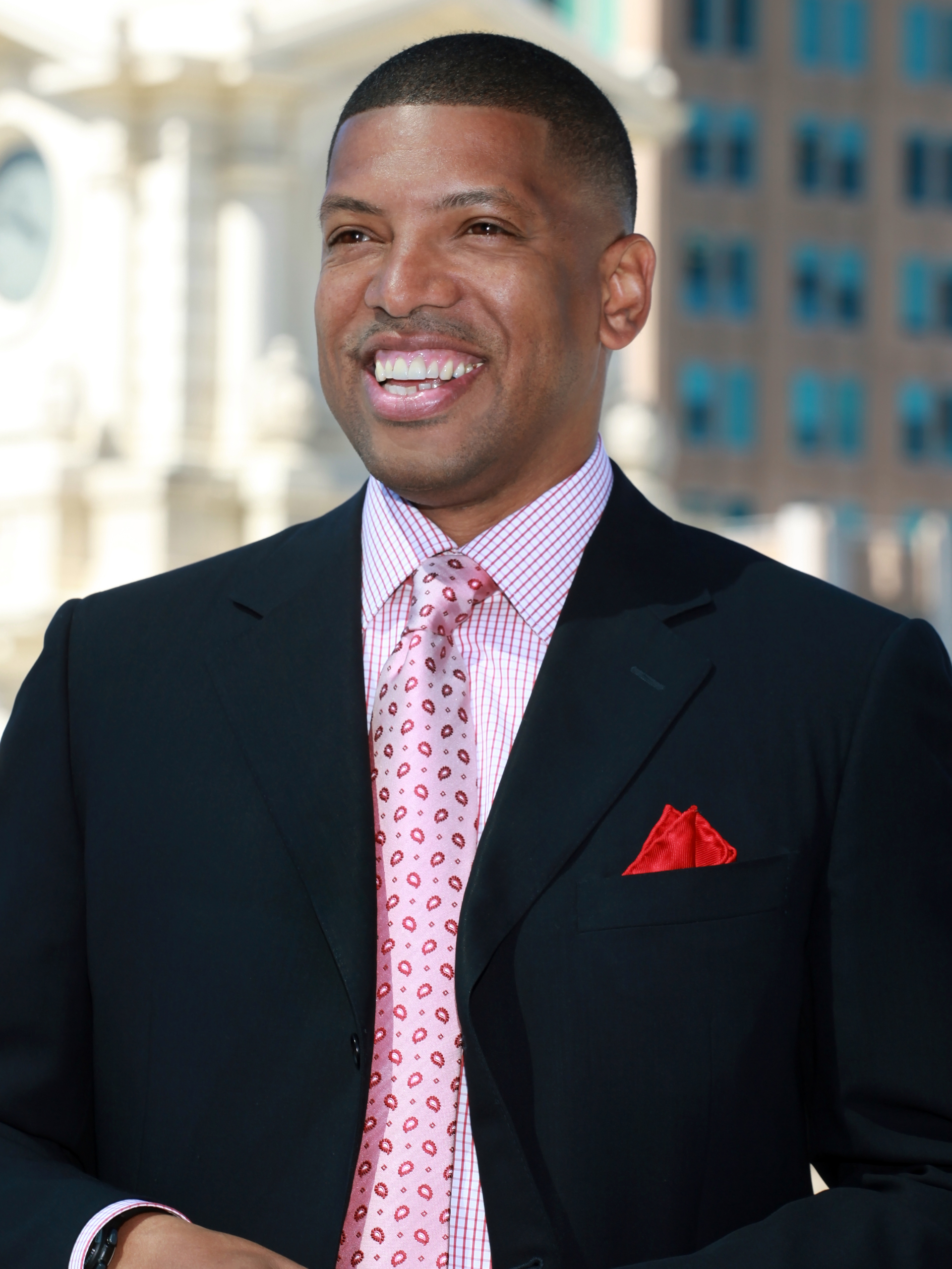

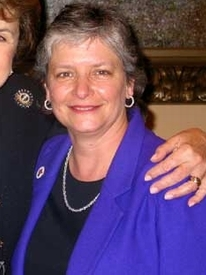
Candidate	Kevin Johnson	Heather Fargo
Party	Democratic	Democratic
First-round vote	32,160	27,472
First-round percentage	46.08%	39.36%
Second-round vote	92,288	67,348
Second-round percentage	57.40%	41.89%
Candidate	Leonard Padilla
Party	Nonpartisan
First-round vote	4,231
First-round percentage	6.06%
Mayor before election
Heather Fargo
Democratic
Elected mayor
Kevin Johnson
Democratic

The 2008 Sacramento mayoral election was held on June 3, 2008 and November 4, 2008 to elect the mayor of Sacramento, California. It saw the election of Kevin Johnson, who defeated incumbent mayor Heather Fargo.

== Results ==
=== First round ===
First round results
Candidate	Votes	%
Kevin Johnson	32,160	46.08
Heather Fargo (incumbent)	27,472	39.36
Leonard Padilla	4,231	6.06
Shawn D. Eldredge	2,462	3.53
Muriel Strand	2,104	3.01
Richard Jones	679	0.97
Adam Daniel	407	0.58
Write-ins	280	0.40
Total votes	69,795	

=== Runoff results ===
Runoff results
Candidate	Votes	%
Kevin Johnson	92,288	58.40
Heather Fargo (incumbent)	67,348	41.89
Write-ins	1,154	0.72
Total votes	160,790	
