= 2008 Minato mayoral election =

Late 2000s Japanese mayoral election

Minato, Tokyo held a mayoral election on June 8, 2008. Incumbent mayor Masaaki Takei, supported by all major parties except the Japanese Communist Party, was re-elected with a clear majority. Polling turnout was low with only about 25% of the electorate voting.

== Results ==
Mayoral election 2008: Minato City
Party	Candidate	Votes	%	±%
Independent, LDP, DPJ, NKP, SDP	Masaaki Takei (武井 雅昭)	29,334		
Independent, JCP	Takashige Kaneko (金子 孝重)	11,803		
Turnout		42,098	25,75%	
