= 2008 Puerto Rico Republican presidential caucuses =

- February 24, 2008
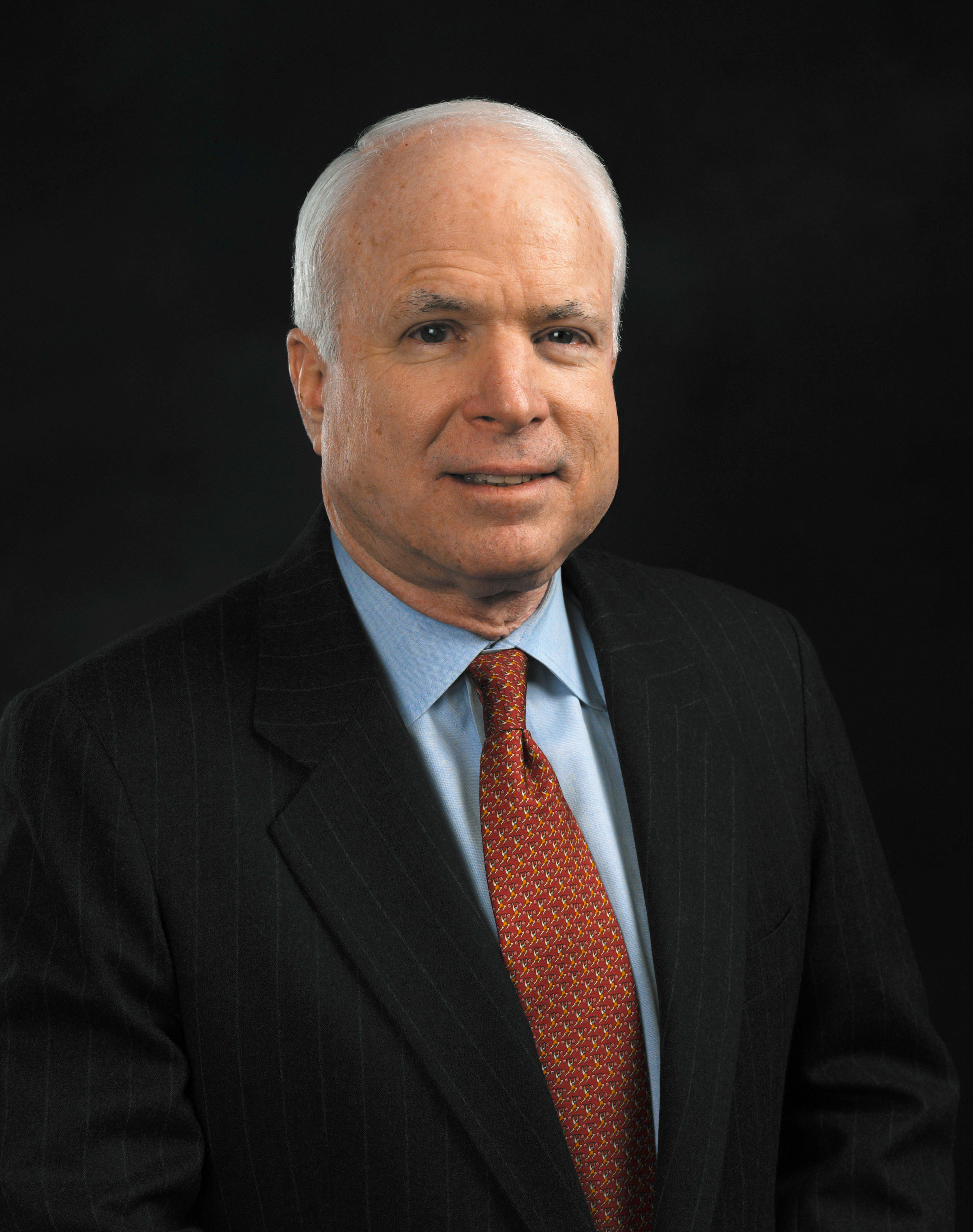

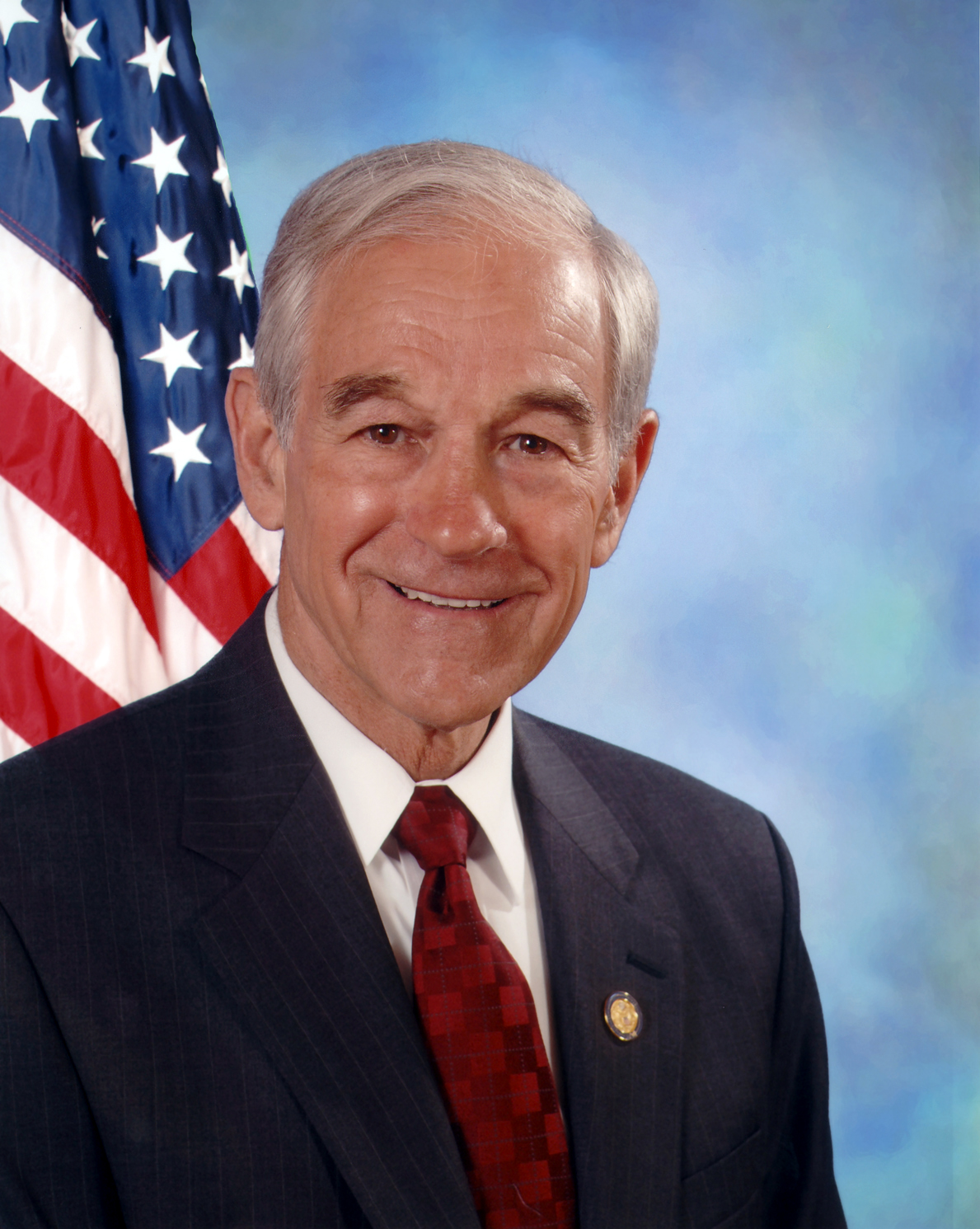
Candidate	John McCain	Mike Huckabee	Ron Paul
Party	Republican	Republican	Republican
Home state	Arizona	Arkansas	Texas
Delegate count	23	0	0
Popular vote	188	10	9
Percentage	90.38%	4.80%	4.33%

The 2008 Puerto Rico Republican presidential caucuses were held on February 24, 2008. John McCain won all 20 pledged (and the support of three unpledged delegates) at the Commonwealth's convention.

== Results ==
100% of precincts reporting
Candidate	Votes	Percentage	Delegates
John McCain	188	90.38%	23
Mike Huckabee	10	4.80%	0
Ron Paul	9	4.33%	0
Total	208	100%	23

== See also ==
- Puerto Rico Democratic primary, 2008
- Republican Party (United States) presidential primaries, 2008
