= 2008 Guam general election =

General elections were held in Guam on 4 November 2008. Voters elected their non-voting delegate to the United States House of Representatives, along with members of the territorial legislature. The election took place alongside the 2008 United States elections.

== United States President straw poll ==
According to tradition, Guam expressed its preference in the 2008 U.S. presidential race, despite having no electoral votes. Senator Obama received 20,119 votes (57.3%) to Senator McCain's 11,941 (34.0%), marking a shift from the island's previous support for Republican presidents, including George W. Bush's two straw poll victories.

== United States House of Representatives ==
Incumbent Delegate Madeleine Bordallo (D) was running unopposed for re-election for Guam's lone at-large congressional seat. She was re-elected unopposed.

== Legislature of Guam ==
There are 26 candidates vying for the 15 seats in the Legislature of Guam. The Democratic Party gained full control of the legislature with 10 seats, while the Republican Party gaining only five seats.
