= 2008 Egyptian municipal elections =

Local elections were held across Egypt on 8 April 2008.

== Run up to elections ==
=== Election Postponement ===
In the 2005 Egypt legislative elections, there was a significant presence of members of the (formally banned) Muslim Brotherhood. While running as independents in the elections, members of the Brotherhood increased presence in parliament from to 88 of 454 seats, though this did not alter the dominant status of the National Democratic Party (NDP). The Egyptian government was criticized by judges in failing to dissuade intimidation of voters; as such, judges would not certify election results.

The government postponed the 2006 municipal elections until 2008 and began taking severe measures against the Muslim Brotherhood. Next, the 2007 constitutional amendments banned political parties based on "any religious frame of reference," to short-circuit attempts by the Brothers to form a political party. In 2008, municipal elections that the Muslim Brothers tried to contest were summarily fixed, sealed and delivered to the NDP, without a single seat allowed the Brothers out of 52,000. Thus, in 2008 in the postponed election, the Brotherhood was prevented from obtaining significant wins in the election, and moreover, many senior members of the group were sentenced to long-term prison convictions. Repression of the Muslim Brothers is standard, but the regime is now also keen to ruin the Brothers’ reputation for competence and clean hands. To tarnish the Brothers in the popular imagination, state television used the peak viewing season of Ramadan to air a slickly produced mini-series about the Brothers in their founding years. Appearing before the prosecution, one of the accused Brothers told the press, "It's all very obvious. There's no case here. The NDP wants to ruin our reputation. But the people and our constituents know us very well."

=== Muslim Brotherhood Activists ===
Prior to the elections, Human Rights Watch alleged mass round-ups of 800 opposition Muslim Brotherhood candidates and would-be electoral candidates. HRW also cited the delaying of a military court announcement for 40 Muslim Brotherhood leaders accused of belonging to an illegal organization until April 15, a week after the elections. A general strike was called for 6 April to protest low wages and rising food costs, with the Muslim Brotherhood giving support to the strike.

== Boycott ==
On 7 April, the day before the election, the Muslim Brotherhood announced it would boycott the election, after being allowed to compete for 20 seats amongst the 52,000 total seat available nationally. The ruling National Democratic Party, led by President Hosni Mubarak was unopposed for election in 70% of the seats. The Muslim Brotherhood and other independents subsequently "lost" all 52,000 seats to the NDP.
