= 2008 Hidalgo state election =

Local election in Mexico

Local elections were held in the Mexican state of Hidalgo on February 17, 2008. Voters went to the polls to elect on the local level:

- 30 local deputies (18 by the first-past-the-post system and 12 by proportional representation) to serve for a three-year term in the Congress of Hidalgo.
