= 2008 United Kingdom local elections =

- 1 May 2008

All 36 metropolitan boroughs, 23 out of 50 unitary authorities, 78 out of 238 English districts, all 22 Welsh principal councils, and 1 directly elected mayor
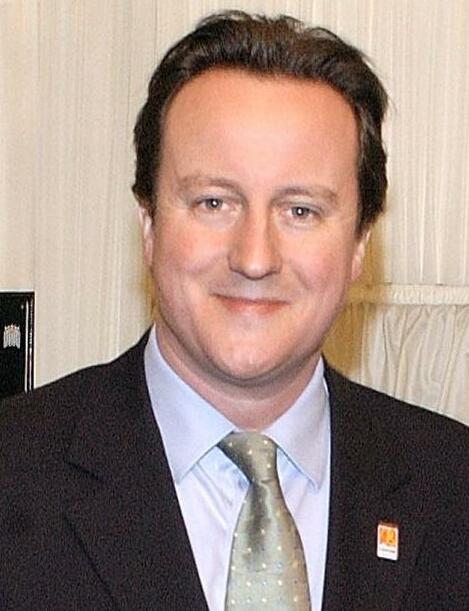

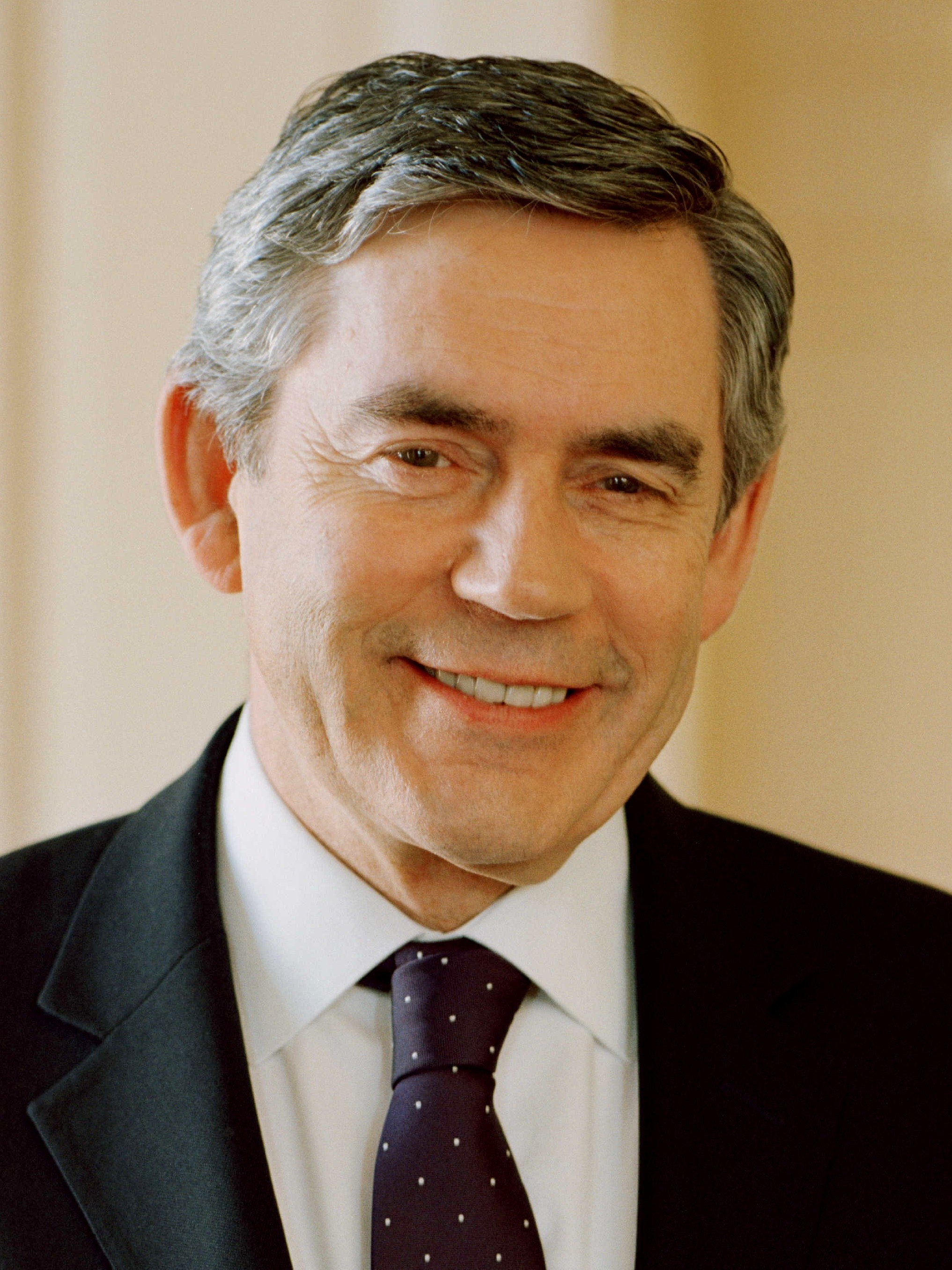

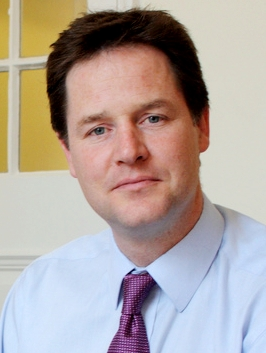
	First party	Second party	Third party
Leader	David Cameron	Gordon Brown	Nick Clegg
Party	Conservative	Labour	Liberal Democrats
Leader since	6 December 2005	24 June 2007	18 December 2007
Percentage	44%	24%	25%
Swing	▲4%	▼3%	▼1%
Councils	65	18	12
Councils +/–	▲12	▼9	▲1
Councillors	3,154	2,368	1,805
Councillors +/–	▲256	▼331	▲34
- Colours denote the winning party, as shown in the main table of results.

The 2008 United Kingdom local elections were held on 1 May 2008. These elections took place in 137 English Local Authorities and all Welsh Councils.

There were also extraordinary elections held for four of the new unitary authorities being created, in Northumberland, County Durham and Cheshire (two councils – Cheshire East and Cheshire West and Chester). Scheduled elections for Penwith in Cornwall, Shrewsbury and Atcham in Shropshire, Bedford and South Bedfordshire in Bedfordshire and five district councils in Cheshire were cancelled, due to the up-coming unitary authorities being established in those counties.

The Labour Party finished in 3rd place by vote share, trailing the Conservatives by 20%, the largest such margin ever between the two main parties. Aside from the strong showing for David Cameron's Conservatives, Plaid Cymru and the Lib Dems each made net gains of over 30 seats and the BNP made 10 net gains to finish with over 30 seats.

The strong showing for the Conservatives and the disappointing showing by Labour reflected the change in the political mood of Britain at the time, where the Labour government, now led by prime minister Gordon Brown, had suffered a slump in popularity due to the 2008 financial crisis and economic fears which were affecting Britain at the time.

== Results ==
Party	Councillors		Councils	
Party	Number	Change	Number	Change
Conservative	3,155	▲257	65	▲12
Labour	2,365	▼334	18	▼9
Liberal Democrats	1,804	▲33	12	▲1
Plaid Cymru	205	▲31	0	▼1
Green	47	▲5	0	Steady
Residents	43	▼11	0	Steady
BNP	37	▲10	0	Steady
Liberal	20	▼2	0	Steady
Health Concern	10	Steady	0	Steady
UKIP	8	▲3	0	Steady
Respect	4	▲1	0	Steady
Socialist	2	Steady	0	Steady
Others	716	▲4	0	Steady
No overall control	n/a	n/a	64	▼3

== England ==
=== Metropolitan boroughs ===
All 36 English metropolitan borough councils had one third of their seats up for election.

Council	Previous control	Result	Details
Barnsley	Labour	Labour hold	Details
Birmingham	No overall control	No overall control hold	Details
Bolton	No overall control	No overall control hold	Details
Bradford	No overall control	No overall control hold	Details
Bury	No overall control	Conservative gain	Details
Calderdale	No overall control	No overall control hold	Details
Coventry	Conservative	No overall control gain	Details
Doncaster	No overall control	No overall control hold	Details
Dudley	Conservative	Conservative hold	Details
Gateshead	Labour	Labour hold	Details
Kirklees	No overall control	No overall control hold	Details
Knowsley	Labour	Labour hold	Details
Leeds	No overall control	No overall control hold	Details
Liverpool	Liberal Democrats	Liberal Democrats hold	Details
Manchester	Labour	Labour hold	Details
Newcastle upon Tyne	Liberal Democrats	Liberal Democrats hold	Details
North Tyneside	No overall control	Conservative gain	Details
Oldham	Labour	No overall control gain	Details
Rochdale	Liberal Democrats	Liberal Democrats hold	Details
Rotherham	Labour	Labour hold	Details
Salford	Labour	Labour hold	Details
Sandwell	Labour	Labour hold	Details
Sefton	No overall control	No overall control hold	Details
Sheffield	No overall control	Liberal Democrats gain	Details
Solihull	No overall control	Conservative gain	Details
South Tyneside	Labour	Labour hold	Details
St Helens	No overall control	No overall control hold	Details
Stockport	Liberal Democrats	Liberal Democrats hold	Details
Sunderland	Labour	Labour hold	Details
Tameside	Labour	Labour hold	Details
Trafford	Conservative	Conservative hold	Details
Wakefield	Labour	Labour hold	Details
Walsall	Conservative	Conservative hold	Details
Wigan	Labour	Labour hold	Details
Wirral	No overall control	No overall control hold	Details
Wolverhampton	Labour	No overall control gain	Details

=== Unitary authorities ===
==== Existing councils ====
In 19 English unitary authorities one third of the council was up for election.

Council	Previous control	Result	Details
Blackburn with Darwen	No overall control	No overall control hold	Details
Derby	No overall control	No overall control hold	Details
Halton	Labour	Labour hold	Details
Hartlepool	Labour	No overall control gain	Details
Kingston upon Hull	No overall control	Liberal Democrats gain	Details
Milton Keynes	No overall control	No overall control hold	Details
North East Lincolnshire	No overall control	No overall control hold	Details
Peterborough	Conservative	Conservative hold	Details
Plymouth	Conservative	Conservative hold	Details
Portsmouth	No overall control	No overall control hold	Details
Reading	Labour	No overall control gain	Details
Slough	No overall control	Labour gain	Details
Southampton	No overall control	Conservative gain	Details
Southend-on-Sea	Conservative	Conservative hold	Details
Stoke-on-Trent	No overall control	No overall control hold	Details
Swindon	Conservative	Conservative hold	Details
Thurrock	No overall control	No overall control hold	Details
Warrington	No overall control	No overall control hold	Details
Wokingham	Conservative	Conservative hold	Details

==== New councils ====
Elections were held in three of the current non-metropolitan counties of Cheshire, County Durham and Northumberland for four new unitary authorities which were established in 2009. These councils were "shadow councils" until then.

Council	Result	Details
Cheshire East	Conservative	Details
Cheshire West and Chester	Conservative	Details
Durham	Labour	Details
Northumberland	No overall control	Details

=== District councils ===
==== Whole council ====
In 4 English district authorities the whole council was up for election following ward boundary changes.

Council	Previous control	Result	Details
Barrow-in-Furness	No overall control	No overall control hold	Details
Basingstoke and Deane	No overall control	Conservative gain	Details
South Lakeland	Liberal Democrats	Liberal Democrats hold	Details
Welwyn Hatfield	Conservative	Conservative hold	Details

==== Half of council ====
In 7 English district authorities, half of the council was up for election.

Council	Previous control	Result	Details
Adur	Conservative	Conservative hold	Details
Cheltenham	No overall control	No overall control hold	Details
Fareham	Conservative	Conservative hold	Details
Gosport	No overall control	No overall control hold	Details
Hastings	No overall control	No overall control hold	Details
Nuneaton and Bedworth	Labour	Conservative gain	Details
Oxford	No overall control	No overall control hold	Details

==== Third of council ====
In 67 English district authorities, a third of the council was up for election.

Council	Previous control	Result	Details
Amber Valley	Conservative	Conservative hold	Details
Basildon	Conservative	Conservative hold	Details
Bassetlaw	Conservative	Conservative hold	Details
Brentwood	Conservative	Conservative hold	Details
Broxbourne	Conservative	Conservative hold	Details
Burnley	No overall control	Liberal Democrats gain	Details
Cambridge	Liberal Democrats	Liberal Democrats hold	Details
Cannock Chase	No overall control	No overall control hold	Details
Carlisle	No overall control	No overall control hold	Details
Castle Point	Conservative	Conservative hold	Details
Cherwell	Conservative	Conservative hold	Details
Chorley	Conservative	Conservative hold	Details
Colchester	Conservative	No overall control gain	Details
Craven	No overall control	No overall control hold	Details
Crawley	Conservative	Conservative hold	Details
Daventry	Conservative	Conservative hold	Details
Eastleigh	Liberal Democrats	Liberal Democrats hold	Details
Elmbridge	No overall control	Conservative gain	Details
Epping Forest	Conservative	Conservative hold	Details
Exeter	No overall control	No overall control hold	Details
Gloucester	No overall control	No overall control hold	Details
Great Yarmouth	Conservative	Conservative hold	Details
Harlow	No overall control	Conservative gain	Details
Harrogate	No overall control	No overall control hold	Details
Hart	No overall control	No overall control hold	Details
Havant	Conservative	Conservative hold	Details
Hertsmere	Conservative	Conservative hold	Details
Huntingdonshire	Conservative	Conservative hold	Details
Hyndburn	Conservative	Conservative hold	Details
Ipswich	No overall control	No overall control hold	Details
Lincoln	Conservative	Conservative hold	Details
Maidstone	No overall control	Conservative gain	Details
Mole Valley	Conservative	Conservative hold	Details
Newcastle-under-Lyme	No overall control	No overall control hold	Details
North Hertfordshire	Conservative	Conservative hold	Details
Norwich	No overall control	No overall control hold	Details
Pendle	Liberal Democrats	No overall control gain	Details
Preston	No overall control	No overall control hold	Details
Purbeck	No overall control	No overall control hold	Details
Redditch	No overall control	Conservative gain	Details
Reigate and Banstead	Conservative	Conservative hold	Details
Rochford	Conservative	Conservative hold	Details
Rossendale	No overall control	Conservative gain	Details
Rugby	Conservative	Conservative hold	Details
Runnymede	Conservative	Conservative hold	Details
Rushmoor	Conservative	Conservative hold	Details
South Cambridgeshire	Conservative	Conservative hold	Details
St Albans	No overall control	Liberal Democrats gain	Details
Stevenage	Labour	Labour hold	Details
Stratford-on-Avon	Conservative	Conservative hold	Details
Stroud	Conservative	Conservative hold	Details
Swale	Conservative	Conservative hold	Details
Tamworth	Conservative	Conservative hold	Details
Tandridge	Conservative	Conservative hold	Details
Three Rivers	Liberal Democrats	Liberal Democrats hold	Details
Tunbridge Wells	Conservative	Conservative hold	Details
Watford	Liberal Democrats	Liberal Democrats hold	Details
Waveney	Conservative	Conservative hold	Details
West Lancashire	Conservative	Conservative hold	Details
West Lindsey	Liberal Democrats	Conservative gain	Details
West Oxfordshire	Conservative	Conservative hold	Details
Weymouth and Portland	No overall control	No overall control hold	Details
Winchester	Conservative	Conservative hold	Details
Woking	Conservative	Conservative hold	Details
Worcester	No overall control	No overall control hold	Details
Worthing	Conservative	Conservative hold	Details
Wyre Forest	No overall control	Conservative gain	Details

=== Mayoral elections ===
Local Authority	Previous Mayor	Mayor-elect	Details
London	Ken Livingstone (Labour)	Boris Johnson (Conservative) gain	Details

== Wales ==
Map showing council control (left) and ward control (right).

In all 22 Welsh councils the whole of the council was up for election.

Council	Previous control	Result	Details
Blaenau Gwent	Labour	No overall control gain	Details
Bridgend	No overall control	No overall control hold	Details
Caerphilly	Labour	No overall control gain	Details
Cardiff	No overall control	No overall control hold	Details
Carmarthenshire	No overall control	No overall control hold	Details
Ceredigion	No overall control	No overall control hold	Details
Conwy	No overall control	No overall control hold	Details
Denbighshire	No overall control	No overall control hold	Details
Flintshire	Labour	No overall control gain	Details
Gwynedd	Plaid Cymru	No overall control gain	Details
Isle of Anglesey	Independent	Independent hold	Details
Merthyr Tydfil	Labour	Independent gain	Details
Monmouthshire	Conservative	Conservative hold	Details
Neath Port Talbot	Labour	Labour hold	Details
Newport	Labour	No overall control gain	Details
Pembrokeshire	Independent	Independent hold	Details
Powys	Independent	Independent hold	Details
Rhondda Cynon Taff	Labour	Labour hold	Details
Swansea	No overall control	No overall control hold	Details
Torfaen	Labour	No overall control gain	Details
Vale of Glamorgan	No overall control	Conservative gain	Details
Wrexham	No overall control	No overall control hold	Details

== See also ==
- 2008 London mayoral election
- 2008 London Assembly election
