= 2008 Stratford-on-Avon District Council election =

2008 UK local government election

Results of the 2008 Stratford-on-Avon District Council election

The 2008 Stratford-on-Avon District Council election took place on 1 May 2008 to elect members of Stratford-on-Avon District Council in Warwickshire, England. One third of the council was up for election and the Conservative Party stayed in overall control of the council.

After the election, the composition of the council was

- Conservative 32
- Liberal Democrat 19
- Independent 2

== Background ==
Before the election the Conservatives had a 21-seat majority with 37 councillors, as compared to 14 for the Liberal Democrats and 2 independents. 19 seats were being contested in the election, which was expected to be fought mainly between the Conservatives and Liberal Democrats.

== Election result ==
The results saw the Liberal Democrats make 5 gains to reduce the Conservatives majority on the council. 3 of the gains for the Liberal Democrats came in the wards of Stratford-upon-Avon itself, along with 2 in Harbury and Shipston. Meanwhile, the one independent councillor who was up for election, Kim James, successfully held his seat in Bidford and Salford ward, defeating the Liberal Democrat candidate by 185 votes.

The losses for the Conservatives were one of the worst performances by the party in the 2008 local elections, in contrast to the national picture where they made strong gains. Meanwhile, the Liberal Democrat leader, Nick Clegg described the Stratford election as "an excellent result".

Stratford-on-Avon local election result 2008
Party	Seats	Gains	Losses	Net gain/loss	Seats %	Votes %	Votes	+/−
Conservative	11	0	5	-5	57.9	51.0	15,222	-0.9%
Liberal Democrats	7	5	0	+5	36.8	39.9	11,916	+4.3%
Independent	1	0	0	0	5.3	3.4	1,019	+0.4%
Labour	0	0	0	0	0	3.7	1,103	-1.8%
UKIP	0	0	0	0	0	1.4	406	-0.9%
Green	0	0	0	0	0	0.6	183	-1.1%

== Ward results ==
Alcester
Party	Candidate	Votes	%	±%
Conservative	Susan Adams	1,139	55.1	−4.9
Liberal Democrats	Carol Lane	856	41.4	+10.3
Labour	Michael Gerrard	73	3.5	−0.2
Majority		283	13.7	−15.2
Turnout		2,068	43.9	+0.2
Conservative hold		Swing		

Aston Cantlow
Party	Candidate	Votes	%	±%
Conservative	William Lawrence	524	73.0	+11.9
Liberal Democrats	John Bicknell	194	27.0	−11.9
Majority		330	46.0	+23.8
Turnout		718	47.0	−5.9
Conservative hold		Swing		

Bardon
Party	Candidate	Votes	%	±%
Conservative	Valerie Hobbs	537	73.1	+10.8
Liberal Democrats	John Insoll	198	26.9	+3.8
Majority		339	46.1	+6.9
Turnout		735	41.7	−0.5
Conservative hold		Swing		

Bidford and Salford
Party	Candidate	Votes	%	±%
Independent	Kim James	903	52.0	+52.0
Liberal Democrats	Rona Fitzpatrick	718	41.3	+4.9
Labour	Alec Brown	116	6.7	−0.9
Majority		185	10.7	
Turnout		1,737	32.9	−5.3
Independent hold		Swing		

Burton Dassett
Party	Candidate	Votes	%	±%
Conservative	Simon Jackson	647	78.8	+13.0
Liberal Democrats	Alan Hill	174	21.2	−13.0
Majority		473	57.6	+26.1
Turnout		821	45.9	−3.7
Conservative hold		Swing		

Claverdon
Party	Candidate	Votes	%	±%
Conservative	John Horner	684	82.6	+9.3
Liberal Democrats	Jeanne Lowe	144	17.4	−9.3
Majority		540	65.2	+18.7
Turnout		828	45.9	−1.4
Conservative hold		Swing		

Ettington
Party	Candidate	Votes	%	±%
Conservative	Izzi Seccombe	597	68.0	+2.6
Liberal Democrats	Christian Senior	165	18.8	−15.8
Independent	Darryl Armstrong	116	13.2	+13.2
Majority		432	49.2	+18.4
Turnout		878	47.4	−2.3
Conservative hold		Swing		

Harbury
Party	Candidate	Votes	%	±%
Liberal Democrats	Beverley Mann	861	50.3	+6.8
Conservative	Peter Barton	850	49.7	−6.8
Majority		11	0.6	
Turnout		1,711	45.5	+2.1
Liberal Democrats gain from Conservative		Swing		

Henley
Party	Candidate	Votes	%	±%
Conservative	Stephen Thirlwell	1,172	74.6	−2.3
Liberal Democrats	Karyl Rees	215	13.7	+6.0
UKIP	Brett Parsons	184	11.7	+3.5
Majority		957	60.9	−7.8
Turnout		1,571	44.0	−2.2
Conservative hold		Swing		

Kineton
Party	Candidate	Votes	%	±%
Conservative	Susan Wixey	979	70.0	+10.9
Liberal Democrats	Vivien Purdy	420	30.0	−10.9
Majority		559	40.0	+21.7
Turnout		1,399	41.5	−4.5
Conservative hold		Swing		

Shipston
Party	Candidate	Votes	%	±%
Liberal Democrats	Richard Cheney	934	48.7	−0.5
Conservative	Trevor Russel	921	48.0	+1.5
Labour	Jeffrey Kenner	64	3.3	−1.0
Majority		13	0.7	−1.9
Turnout		1,919	48.6	−0.7
Liberal Democrats gain from Conservative		Swing		

Southam
Party	Candidate	Votes	%	±%
Conservative	John Appleton	853	52.1	−4.7
Labour	Peter Thomas	404	24.7	−7.6
Liberal Democrats	Angela Adkins	380	23.2	+12.3
Majority		449	27.4	+2.9
Turnout		1,637	33.1	−1.5
Conservative hold		Swing		

Stratford Alveston
Party	Candidate	Votes	%	±%
Liberal Democrats	Kate Rolfe	1,264	49.1	+10.3
Conservative	Lynda Organ	1,088	42.3	−6.3
UKIP	Ralph Berry	222	8.6	+0.7
Majority		176	6.8	
Turnout		2,574	48.3	+1.7
Liberal Democrats gain from Conservative		Swing		

Stratford Avenue and New Town
Party	Candidate	Votes	%	±%
Liberal Democrats	Trevor Honychurch	991	47.6	+30.0
Conservative	Juliet Short	957	46.0	+5.1
Labour	Matthew Stephens	132	6.3	+0.2
Majority		34	1.6	
Turnout		2,080	37.5	−5.5
Liberal Democrats gain from Conservative		Swing		

Stratford Guild and Hathaway
Party	Candidate	Votes	%	±%
Liberal Democrats	Ron Cockings	1,141	47.3	+16.3
Conservative	Michael Perry	956	39.6	−10.8
Green	Hugh Chatwin	183	7.6	+1.7
Labour	George Hathaway	134	5.6	−2.1
Majority		185	7.7	
Turnout		2,414	42.0	−2.4
Liberal Democrats gain from Conservative		Swing		

Stratford Mount Pleasant
Party	Candidate	Votes	%	±%
Liberal Democrats	Joyce Taylor	798	66.8	−1.3
Conservative	Karen Parnell	317	26.5	+3.3
Labour	David Talbot	80	6.7	−2.0
Majority		481	40.3	−4.6
Turnout		1,195	35.6	−4.5
Liberal Democrats hold		Swing		

Studley
Party	Candidate	Votes	%	±%
Liberal Democrats	Paul Beaman	1,083	59.0	+15.1
Conservative	Jon Vale	652	35.5	−13.0
Labour	Jacqueline Abbott	100	5.4	−2.2
Majority		431	23.5	
Turnout		1,835	40.6	+0.0
Liberal Democrats hold		Swing		

Tanworth
Party	Candidate	Votes	%	±%
Conservative	George Atkinson	1,140	86.6	+5.7
Liberal Democrats	Sally Hinchley	176	13.4	−5.7
Majority		964	73.3	+1.5
Turnout		1,316	41.5	+0.3
Conservative hold		Swing		

Wellesbourne
Party	Candidate	Votes	%	±%
Conservative	Sue Main	1,209	50.1	+7.2
Liberal Democrats	Michala Piotrowski	1,204	49.9	−2.5
Majority		5	0.2	
Turnout		2,413	45.0	+1.5
Conservative hold		Swing		
