= 2008 Mole Valley District Council election =

2008 UK local government election

Results of the 2008 Mole Valley District Council election

Elections to Mole Valley Council were held on 1 May 2008. One third of the council was up for election and the Conservative Party stayed in overall control of the council. Overall turnout was 46.5% a drop from the 47.2% seen in the 2007 election.

Issues in the election included a proposed incinerator, Council Tax, planning, leisure and recycling. The results saw no change in the number of councillors for each party but the Conservative and Liberal Democrat parties swapped seats. The Conservatives gained Westcott ward from the Liberal Democrats but lost Leatherhead North to them.

After the election, the composition of the council was:

- Conservative 22
- Liberal Democrat 16
- Independent 3

== Election result ==
Mole Valley District Council election result 2008
Party	Seats	Gains	Losses	Net gain/loss	Seats %	Votes %	Votes	+/−
Conservative	6	1	1	0	46.2	47.0	10,520	-1.4%
Liberal Democrats	5	1	1	0	38.5	34.1	7,626	-5.3%
Ashtead Independent Working With Ashtead Residents	2	0	0	0	15.4	12.0	2,682	+7.8%
UKIP	0	0	0	0	0	5.2	1,167	+2.9%
Green	0	0	0	0	0	1.3	298	-1.3%
Labour	0	0	0	0	0	0.4	91	-2.7%

== Ward results ==
Ashtead Common
Party	Candidate	Votes	%	±%
Ashtead Independent Working With Ashtead Residents	David Howell	893	58.1	+6.5
Conservative	Len Wood	643	41.9	−1.1
Majority		250	16.2	+7.6
Turnout		1,536	48.9	−4.4
Independent hold		Swing		

Ashtead Park
Party	Candidate	Votes	%	±%
Ashtead Independent Working With Ashtead Residents	Christopher Townsend	906	57.5	+13.4
Conservative	Alex Burrows	592	37.6	−7.9
UKIP	Bob Cane	78	4.9	+1.2
Majority		314	19.9	
Turnout		1,576	49.6	−0.9
Independent hold		Swing		

Ashtead Village
Party	Candidate	Votes	%	±%
Conservative	Chris Reynolds	1,168	53.8	−1.2
Ashtead Independent Working With Ashtead Residents	Simon Ling	883	40.6	+3.9
UKIP	Frances Howell	122	5.6	+2.9
Majority		285	13.2	−5.1
Turnout		2,173	48.2	−3.1
Conservative hold		Swing		

Bookham North
Party	Candidate	Votes	%	±%
Conservative	Clare Curran	1,466	66.7	+2.3
Liberal Democrats	Martin Joseph	731	33.3	+6.8
Majority		735	33.4	−4.5
Turnout		2,197	49.1	−1.0
Conservative hold		Swing		

Bookham South
Party	Candidate	Votes	%	±%
Liberal Democrats	Elizabeth Howarth	1,200	52.2	−3.4
Conservative	Graham Hems	899	39.1	−5.3
UKIP	Julie Langton-Smith	110	4.8	+4.8
Labour	Simon Bottomley	91	4.0	+4.0
Majority		301	13.1	+1.9
Turnout		2,300	52.0	−2.8
Liberal Democrats hold		Swing		

Dorking North
Party	Candidate	Votes	%	±%
Liberal Democrats	Paul Elderton	753	51.4	−1.8
Conservative	Ron Billard	514	35.1	+6.6
Green	Robert Sedgwick	130	8.9	−5.5
UKIP	Michael Foulston	67	4.6	+4.6
Majority		239	16.3	−8.4
Turnout		1,464	46.7	−2.0
Liberal Democrats hold		Swing		

Dorking South
Party	Candidate	Votes	%	±%
Liberal Democrats	Tim Loretto	1,181	52.4	−2.8
Conservative	Misbah Mosobbir	734	32.6	+2.9
UKIP	Kathleen Peters	169	7.5	+2.3
Green	Mandy Barnett	168	7.5	+1.5
Majority		447	19.8	−5.7
Turnout		2,252	43.2	−2.7
Liberal Democrats hold		Swing		

Fetcham East
Party	Candidate	Votes	%	±%
Conservative	Carolyn Corden	1,036	76.2	+7.1
Liberal Democrats	Kathy Grigson	324	23.8	−2.4
Majority		712	52.4	+9.5
Turnout		1,360	46.0	−2.5
Conservative hold		Swing		

Fetcham West
Party	Candidate	Votes	%	±%
Conservative	Emile Aboud	840	50.2	−13.9
Liberal Democrats	Raj Haque	834	49.8	+13.9
Majority		6	0.4	−27.8
Turnout		1,674	55.0	+7.4
Conservative hold		Swing		

Holmwoods
Party	Candidate	Votes	%	±%
Liberal Democrats	Michael Howard	870	51.1	−0.2
Conservative	Chris Quinlan	563	33.1	+1.2
UKIP	Margaret Curran	269	15.8	+9.7
Majority		307	18.0	−1.4
Turnout		1,702	36.1	−1.5
Liberal Democrats hold		Swing		

Leatherhead North
Party	Candidate	Votes	%	±%
Liberal Democrats	Bob Hedgeland	866	52.3	+4.8
Conservative	Kyle Green	621	37.5	+4.4
UKIP	Stan Masters	170	10.3	+4.3
Majority		245	14.8	+0.4
Turnout		1,657	33.9	−4.2
Liberal Democrats gain from Conservative		Swing		

Leatherhead South
Party	Candidate	Votes	%	±%
Conservative	Rosemary Dickson	889	61.4	+5.8
Liberal Democrats	Dave Howarth	454	31.3	−6.1
UKIP	Leigh Jones	106	7.3	+7.3
Majority		435	30.1	+11.9
Turnout		1,449	44.3	−4.0
Conservative hold		Swing		

Westcott
Party	Candidate	Votes	%	±%
Conservative	James Friend	555	53.2	+4.9
Liberal Democrats	Ian Fraser Ker	413	39.6	−9.3
UKIP	Afonso Afonso	76	7.3	+7.3
Majority		142	13.6	
Turnout		1,044	61.0	−1.6
Conservative gain from Liberal Democrats		Swing		
