= 2008 Waveney District Council election =

2008 UK local government election

Map of the results

The 2008 Waveney District Council election took place on 1 May 2008 to elect members of Waveney District Council in England. This was on the same day as other local elections.

== Summary ==
2008 Waveney District Council election
Party	This election			Full council			This election		
Party	Seats	Net	Seats %	Other	Total	Total %	Votes	Votes %	+/−
Conservative	12	▲2	70.6	19	31	64.6	10,818	40.9	+4.9
Labour	4	Steady	23.5	8	12	25.0	7,306	27.6	-2.0
Liberal Democrats	1	Steady	5.9	2	3	6.3	3,034	11.5	-0.3
Green	0	Steady	0.0	1	1	2.1	2,889	10.9	-0.1
Independent	0	▼2	0.0	1	1	2.1	932	3.5	-1.6
UKIP	0	Steady	0.0	0	0	0.0	1,474	5.6	-0.9
