= 2008 Great Yarmouth Borough Council election =

2008 UK local government election

Map of the results of the 2008 Great Yarmouth council election. Conservatives in blue and Labour in red. Wards in grey were not contested in 2008.

The 2008 Great Yarmouth Borough Council election took place on 1 May 2008 to elect members of Great Yarmouth Borough Council in Norfolk, England. One third of the council was up for election and the Conservative Party stayed in overall control of the council.

After the election, the composition of the council was:

- Conservative 24
- Labour 15

== Background ==
13 seats were contested at the election with both the Conservative and Labour parties contesting every seat, while the Liberal Democrats had nominated candidates for 6 seats, the United Kingdom Independence Party 3 and the Green Party 2 seats.

== Election result ==
The results saw the Conservatives increase their majority on the council after gaining two seats from Labour. This took the Conservatives' tally to 24 seats, compared to 15 for Labour, while none of the other parties who contested the election won any seats. The overall turnout at the election was 30.02%, slightly down on the over 31% in 2007.

One of the two Conservatives gains came in Bradwell North, where the leader of the Labour group on the council, Trevor Wainwright, lost by 48 votes. Wainwright put his defeat down to national issues and in particular the abolition of the 10p rate of income tax. The other Conservative gain came in Magdalen ward where councillor Colleen Walker was defeated by Patricia Page by 64 votes. Among those to hold their seats were the Conservative leader of the council Barry Coleman and the Conservative mayor Paul Garrod. Coleman agreed that national events had affected the election saying "You can't help but think national issues came into play in this vote".

Following the election Mick Castle returned as leader of the Labour group on the council, after previously having been group leader from 2004 to 2006.

Great Yarmouth local election result 2008
Party	Seats	Gains	Losses	Net gain/loss	Seats %	Votes %	Votes	+/−
Conservative	9	2	0	+2	69.2	54.7	9,393	+1.7%
Labour	4	0	2	-2	30.8	34.3	5,899	-1.7%
Liberal Democrats	0	0	0	0	0	6.1	1,053	+3.5%
UKIP	0	0	0	0	0	2.7	467	-0.6%
Green	0	0	0	0	0	2.2	370	-1.3%

== Ward results ==
Bradwell North
Party	Candidate	Votes	%	±%
Conservative	Alan Grey	761	47.0	−9.6
Labour	Trevor Wainwright	713	44.0	+0.6
Liberal Democrats	John Loades	146	9.0	+9.0
Majority		48	3.0	−10.2
Turnout		1,620	32.7	+1.2
Conservative gain from Labour		Swing		

Bradwell South and Hopton
Party	Candidate	Votes	%	±%
Conservative	Stephen Ames	814	48.0	−5.2
Liberal Democrats	Aleck Buchanan	381	22.5	+22.5
Labour	Joanne Vriesema	325	19.2	−8.7
UKIP	Colin Aldred	177	10.4	−8.5
Majority		433	25.5	+0.2
Turnout		1,697	33.8	+1.9
Conservative hold		Swing		

Central and Northgate
Party	Candidate	Votes	%	±%
Labour	Michael Taylor	636	43.1	+0.7
Conservative	Thomas Garrod	560	38.0	+6.4
UKIP	Gabriele Baugh	143	9.7	−0.3
Liberal Democrats	Anthony Harris	135	9.2	−0.4
Majority		76	5.2	−5.5
Turnout		1,474	26.7	−1.7
Labour hold		Swing		

Claydon
Party	Candidate	Votes	%	±%
Labour	Anthony Blyth	704	45.1	+1.2
Conservative	Margaret Greenacre	604	38.7	−3.0
Green	Ralph Woodcock	252	16.2	+1.7
Majority		100	6.4	+4.2
Turnout		1,560	28.4	−1.8
Labour hold		Swing		

East Flegg
Party	Candidate	Votes	%	±%
Conservative	George Jermany	930	66.9	−7.4
Labour	Jamie Smith	242	17.4	−8.3
Liberal Democrats	Rodney Cole	218	15.7	+15.7
Majority		688	49.5	+0.9
Turnout		1,390	36.4	−0.4
Conservative hold		Swing		

Gorleston
Party	Candidate	Votes	%	±%
Conservative	Bertie Collins	991	76.6	+25.8
Labour	Rex Tyrrell	303	23.4	+8.0
Majority		688	53.2	+36.1
Turnout		1,294	32.8	−2.6
Conservative hold		Swing		

Magdalen
Party	Candidate	Votes	%	±%
Conservative	Patricia Page	816	52.0	+3.8
Labour	Colleen Walker	752	48.0	−3.8
Majority		64	4.0	
Turnout		1,568	30.6	+0.1
Conservative gain from Labour		Swing		

Nelson
Party	Candidate	Votes	%	±%
Labour	Michael Jeal	487	45.3	+2.9
Conservative	Joy Cosaitis	377	35.1	+7.8
Green	Anne Purchase-Walker	118	11.0	+3.6
Liberal Democrats	Nicholas Dyer	93	8.7	+8.7
Majority		110	10.2	−4.9
Turnout		1,075	19.3	−4.3
Labour hold		Swing		

Ormesby
Party	Candidate	Votes	%	±%
Conservative	Charles Reynolds	997	79.9	+11.2
Labour	Jennifer Livingstone	251	20.1	+1.6
Majority		746	59.8	+9.5
Turnout		1,248	36.2	−2.1
Conservative hold		Swing		

St Andrews
Party	Candidate	Votes	%	±%
Conservative	Patrick Cook	619	62.6	+14.2
Labour	Gary Fox	370	37.4	+0.7
Majority		249	25.2	+13.5
Turnout		989	28.5	−2.6
Conservative hold		Swing		

Southtown and Cobholm
Party	Candidate	Votes	%	±%
Labour	Penelope Linden	334	46.1	+1.9
Conservative	James Dinsdale	163	22.5	−7.0
UKIP	Paul Baugh	147	20.3	+1.0
Liberal Democrats	John Brookshaw	80	11.0	+11.0
Majority		171	23.6	+8.9
Turnout		724	20.5	−2.4
Labour hold		Swing		

West Flegg
Party	Candidate	Votes	%	±%
Conservative	Barry Coleman	1,068	79.0	+3.6
Labour	Katie James	284	21.0	−3.6
Majority		784	58.0	+7.1
Turnout		1,352	34.4	−1.8
Conservative hold		Swing		

Yarmouth North
Party	Candidate	Votes	%	±%
Conservative	Paul Garrod	693	58.2	+3.8
Labour	Charles Marsden	498	41.8	−3.8
Majority		195	16.4	+7.6
Turnout		1,191	34.6	+0.9
Conservative hold		Swing		
