= 2008 Maidstone Borough Council election =

2008 UK local government election

Results of the 2008 Maidstone District Council election

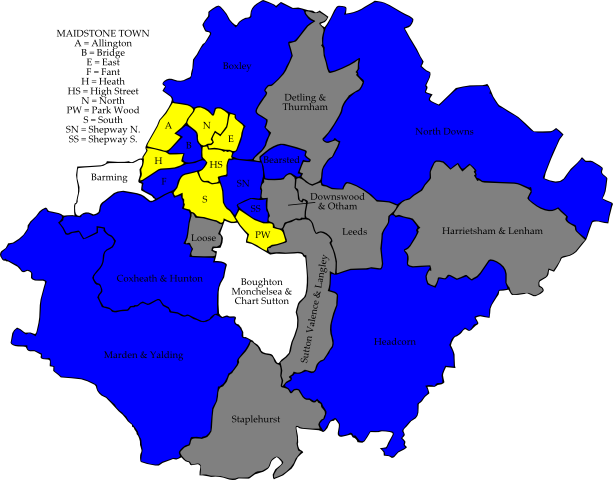
Map of the results of the 2008 Maidstone council election. Conservatives in blue, Liberal Democrats in yellow and independents in white. Wards in grey were not contested in 2008.

The 2008 Maidstone Borough Council election took place on 1 May 2008 to elect members of Maidstone Borough Council in Kent, England. One third of the council was up for election and the Conservative Party gained overall control of the council from no overall control.

After the election, the composition of the council was:

- Conservative 29
- Liberal Democrat 20
- Independent 5
- Labour 1

== Background ==
Before the election the Conservatives were the largest party on the council with 27 seats, but did not have a majority. The council however was run by a coalition of the other groups, with the Liberal Democrats leading an alliance with Labour and the independents. Between them these groups had 28 seats, until the resignation of Liberal Democrat councillor Peter Hooper, after he was arrested in relation to a computer-related crime, left them with the same number of seats as the Conservatives.

19 seats were being contested in the election, with the Conservatives defending 8 and the Liberal Democrats 7.

== Election result ==
The results saw the Conservatives gain a majority of the council after making a net gain of 2 seats, in what was the first time any party had a majority on the council for 25 years. The Conservatives went up to 29 seats, while the Liberal Democrats dropped one seat to 20. The Labour group leader Morel D'Souza was defeated in Fant ward and his party was reduced to just 1 seat. Meanwhile, the independents went up by 1 seat to have 5 seats on the council. Overall turnout in the election was 35.58%.

Maidstone local election result 2008
Party	Seats	Gains	Losses	Net gain/loss	Seats %	Votes %	Votes	+/−
Conservative	10	3	1	+2	52.6	49.7	16,328	+0.5%
Liberal Democrats	7	0	1	-1	36.8	32.7	10,732	-0.5%
Independent	2	1	0	+1	10.5	4.0	1,311	-1.4%
Labour	0	0	2	-2	0	6.7	2,215	+0.8%
Green	0	0	0	0	0	6.0	1,981	+0.7%
UKIP	0	0	0	0	0	0.8	263	+0.8%

== Ward results ==
Allington
Party	Candidate	Votes	%	±%
Liberal Democrats	Malcolm Robertson	1,437	59.6	−4.3
Conservative	Jeff Curwood	724	30.0	+1.2
Labour	Marianna Poliszczuk	108	4.5	−2.8
UKIP	Gareth Kendall	86	3.6	+3.6
Green	Amanda Evans	57	2.4	+2.4
Majority		713	29.6	−5.5
Turnout		2,412	42.9	+0.2
Liberal Democrats hold		Swing		

Barming
Party	Candidate	Votes	%	±%
Independent	Fay Gooch	552	51.9	+51.9
Conservative	Cass Jappie	474	44.5	−40.2
Labour	Wendy Hollands	38	3.6	−2.6
Majority		78	7.4	
Turnout		1,064	54.2	+0.3
Independent gain from Conservative		Swing		

Bearsted
Party	Candidate	Votes	%	±%
Conservative	Richard Ash	1,937	74.7	+4.7
Liberal Democrats	Steven Hunter	481	18.5	+0.0
Green	Ian McDonald	176	6.8	−4.5
Majority		1,456	56.1	+4.5
Turnout		2,594	39.7	−3.2
Conservative hold		Swing		

Boughton Monchelsea and Chart Sutton
Party	Candidate	Votes	%	±%
Independent	Mike Fitzgerald	759	89.9	+19.8
UKIP	Keith Woollven	85	10.1	+10.1
Majority		674	79.9	+35.6
Turnout		844	42.0	−8.0
Independent hold		Swing		

Boxley
Party	Candidate	Votes	%	±%
Conservative	Wendy Hinder	1,607	78.8	+11.6
Liberal Democrats	John Doherty	321	15.7	−9.6
Green	Patricia Marchant	111	5.7	+5.7
Majority		1,286	63.1	+21.3
Turnout		2,039	31.4	−1.5
Conservative hold		Swing		

Bridge
Party	Candidate	Votes	%	±%
Conservative	James Ross	671	44.8	+3.4
Liberal Democrats	David Pickett	640	42.7	−7.8
Labour	Sally Willcox	100	6.7	+6.7
Green	Angela Wooi	88	5.9	−2.2
Majority		31	2.1	
Turnout		1,499	35.3	+0.6
Conservative gain from Liberal Democrats		Swing		

Coxheath and Hunton
Party	Candidate	Votes	%	±%
Conservative	John Wilson	1,354	50.9	+3.8
Liberal Democrats	Moira Walter	1,206	45.4	−2.4
Labour	Michael Casserley	99	3.7	−1.3
Majority		148	5.5	
Turnout		2,659	48.3	+0.6
Conservative hold		Swing		

East
Party	Candidate	Votes	%	±%
Liberal Democrats	Patrick Sellar	1,331	56.7	+2.6
Conservative	Edward Winstanley	879	37.4	+1.8
Green	James Shalice	139	5.9	+2.1
Majority		452	19.2	+0.7
Turnout		2,349	37.3	−4.1
Liberal Democrats hold		Swing		

Fant
Party	Candidate	Votes	%	±%
Conservative	Stephen Paine	679	33.3	+9.7
Liberal Democrats	Fran Smith	562	27.6	−12.6
Labour	Morel D'Souza	470	23.1	+10.4
Green	Stuart Jeffery	326	16.0	−1.8
Majority		117	5.7	
Turnout		2,037	32.7	−0.9
Conservative gain from Labour		Swing		

Headcorn
Party	Candidate	Votes	%	±%
Conservative	Richard Thick	1,164	66.7	+5.8
Green	Penny Kemp	581	33.3	−5.8
Majority		583	33.4	+11.5
Turnout		1,745	45.2	+3.3
Conservative hold		Swing		

Heath
Party	Candidate	Votes	%	±%
Liberal Democrats	Bryan Vizzard	562	45.4	−3.4
Conservative	Mark Mears	518	41.8	−1.2
Labour	Patrick Coates	83	6.7	−1.5
Green	Andrew Waldie	75	6.1	+6.1
Majority		44	3.6	−2.2
Turnout		1,238	30.2	−3.2
Liberal Democrats hold		Swing		

High Street
Party	Candidate	Votes	%	±%
Liberal Democrats	Denise Joy	738	43.9	−2.9
Conservative	Paul Butcher	611	36.3	+3.4
Labour	Richard Coates	152	9.0	−2.2
UKIP	John Stanford	92	5.5	+5.5
Green	Wendy Lewis	89	5.3	−3.8
Majority		127	7.6	−6.3
Turnout		1,682	28.6	+0.8
Liberal Democrats hold		Swing		

Marden and Yalding
Party	Candidate	Votes	%	±%
Conservative	John Verrall	1,506	72.9	+10.2
Liberal Democrats	Geoffrey Samme	320	15.5	−4.5
Labour	Edith Davis	240	11.6	+1.4
Majority		1,186	57.4	+14.7
Turnout		2,066	35.2	−1.3
Conservative hold		Swing		

North
Party	Candidate	Votes	%	±%
Liberal Democrats	Jennifer Paterson	1,012	59.4	+5.4
Conservative	Jeff Tree	552	32.4	+4.6
Green	Derek Eagle	141	8.3	+0.2
Majority		460	27.0	+0.7
Turnout		1,705	29.3	−2.7
Liberal Democrats hold		Swing		

North Downs
Party	Candidate	Votes	%	±%
Conservative	Daphne Parvin	599	76.9	+17.4
Liberal Democrats	John Watson	96	12.3	−2.9
Green	Sarah Goodwin	84	10.8	+10.8
Majority		503	64.6	+20.5
Turnout		779	39.2	−6.3
Conservative hold		Swing		

Park Wood
Party	Candidate	Votes	%	±%
Liberal Democrats	Robert Field	447	54.1	+20.0
Conservative	Susan Yates	258	31.2	+0.3
Labour	Liz Stevens	122	14.8	−20.1
Majority		189	22.9	
Turnout		827	24.5	−4.2
Liberal Democrats hold		Swing		

Shepway North
Party	Candidate	Votes	%	±%
Conservative	Christopher Garland	1,091	60.6	+6.8
Labour	Gill Annan	375	20.8	+1.3
Liberal Democrats	Peter Batt	220	12.2	+1.3
Green	Stephen Muggeridge	114	6.3	−0.2
Majority		716	39.8	+5.5
Turnout		1,800	28.7	−1.3
Conservative hold		Swing		

Shepway South
Party	Candidate	Votes	%	±%
Conservative	Bob Hinder	525	51.9	+15.9
Labour	Ken Stevens	324	32.0	−5.1
Liberal Democrats	Maria Sotelo-Moratinos	163	16.1	+3.0
Majority		201	19.9	
Turnout		1,012	23.7	−1.5
Conservative gain from Labour		Swing		

South
Party	Candidate	Votes	%	±%
Liberal Democrats	Ian Chittenden	1,196	48.2	
Conservative	Scott Hahnefeld	1,179	47.6	
Labour	John Randall	104	4.2	
Majority		17	0.6	
Turnout		2,479	41.6	+0.9
Liberal Democrats hold		Swing		
