= 2007 Mole Valley District Council election =

2007 UK local government election

Results of the 2007 Mole Valley District Council election

Elections to Mole Valley Council were held on 3 May 2007. One third of the council was up for election and the Conservative Party kept overall control of the council. Overall turnout was 46.5%.

After the election, the composition of the council was:

- Conservative 22
- Liberal Democrat 16
- Independent 3

== Election result ==
Mole Valley local election result 2007
Party	Seats	Gains	Losses	Net gain/loss	Seats %	Votes %	Votes	+/−
Conservative	8	0	0	0	57.1	48.4	9,760	+0.1%
Liberal Democrats	6	0	0	0	42.9	39.4	7,937	+5.0%
Independent	0	0	0	0	0	4.2	841	-5.5%
Labour	0	0	0	0	0	3.1	625	-1.6%
Green	0	0	0	0	0	2.6	517	+0.2%
UKIP	0	0	0	0	0	2.3	465	+1.7%

== Ward results ==
Ashtead Village
Party	Candidate	Votes	%	±%
Conservative	Chris Hunt	1,261	55.0	+9.6
Independent	Christine Kerton	841	36.7	−3.8
Labour	Clive Scott	66	2.9	−2.5
Liberal Democrats	Bob Hedgeland	63	2.7	+2.7
UKIP	Mark Warren	62	2.7	−1.6
Majority		420	18.3	+13.4
Turnout		2,293	51.3	+1.9
Conservative hold		Swing		

Beare Green
Party	Candidate	Votes	%	±%
Liberal Democrats	Valerie Homewood	425	56.4	−14.9
Conservative	David Mir	328	43.6	+14.9
Majority		97	12.8	−29.8
Turnout		753	50.5	+11.6
Liberal Democrats hold		Swing		

Bookham North
Party	Candidate	Votes	%	±%
Conservative	David Walker	1,438	64.4	+3.2
Liberal Democrats	Paul Tillott	592	26.5	−12.3
Green	Richard Lambert	204	9.1	+9.1
Majority		846	37.9	+15.5
Turnout		2,234	50.1	−2.9
Conservative hold		Swing		

Bookham South
Party	Candidate	Votes	%	±%
Liberal Democrats	Andrew Freeman	1,328	55.6	+16.4
Conservative	Mark Aspinall	1,061	44.4	12.6
Majority		267	11.2	
Turnout		2,389	54.8	−4.1
Liberal Democrats hold		Swing		

Box Hill and Headley
Party	Candidate	Votes	%	±%
Conservative	Daphne Ladell	553	55.8	−9.2
Liberal Democrats	David Preedy	438	44.2	+9.2
Majority		115	11.6	−18.4
Turnout		991	56.9	+4.3
Conservative hold		Swing		

Brockham, Betchworth and Buckland
Party	Candidate	Votes	%	±%
Liberal Democrats	Maurice Homewood	937	50.7	+3.9
Conservative	Chris Quinlan	865	46.8	−3.0
Labour	Laurence Nasskau	45	2.4	−1.0
Majority		72	3.9	
Turnout		1,847	52.0	−1.6
Liberal Democrats hold		Swing		

Capel, Leigh and Newdigate
Party	Candidate	Votes	%	±%
Conservative	Jean Pearson	769	60.0	+14.7
Liberal Democrats	Pamela Brown	430	33.6	−17.5
Labour	Ian James	82	6.4	+2.8
Majority		339	26.4	
Turnout		1,281	40.1	−13.7
Conservative hold		Swing		

Charlwood
Party	Candidate	Votes	%	±%
Conservative	Don Webb	367	66.7	+5.1
Liberal Democrats	Dennis Daniels	183	33.3	−5.1
Majority		184	33.4	+10.2
Turnout		550	33.0	+3.2
Conservative hold		Swing		

Dorking South
Party	Candidate	Votes	%	±%
Liberal Democrats	Stephen Cooksey	1,275	55.2	+8.1
Conservative	Chris House	685	29.7	−7.4
Green	Mandy Barnett	139	6.0	−4.6
UKIP	Kathleen Peters	121	5.2	+5.2
Labour	Nick Trier	90	3.9	−1.3
Majority		590	25.5	+15.5
Turnout		2,310	45.9	−1.1
Liberal Democrats hold		Swing		

Holmwoods
Party	Candidate	Votes	%	±%
Liberal Democrats	Michael Longhurst	894	51.3	−10.3
Conservative	Julian Shersby	556	31.9	+1.0
UKIP	Margaret Curran	107	6.1	+6.1
Labour	Keith Davis	100	5.7	−1.8
Green	Jacquetta Fewster	85	4.9	+4.9
Majority		338	19.4	−11.3
Turnout		1,742	37.6	−0.4
Liberal Democrats hold		Swing		

Leatherhead North
Party	Candidate	Votes	%	±%
Liberal Democrats	Bridget Lewis-Carr	829	47.5	+4.0
Conservative	Mark Rabbetts	577	33.1	−10.6
Labour	Mike Ward	190	10.9	−1.9
UKIP	Bob Cane	105	6.0	+6.0
Green	Robert Sedgwick	43	2.5	+2.5
Majority		252	14.4	
Turnout		1,744	38.1	−1.2
Liberal Democrats hold		Swing		

Leith Hill
Party	Candidate	Votes	%	±%
Conservative	Malcolm Johnson	426	68.9	+4.8
Liberal Democrats	Steven Round	171	27.7	−1.5
Labour	Michael Macdonagh	21	3.4	−3.2
Majority		255	41.2	+6.3
Turnout		618	49.7	+2.1
Conservative hold		Swing		

Mickleham, Westhumble and Pixham
Party	Candidate	Votes	%	±%
Conservative	Ben Tatham	493	59.3	+2.7
Liberal Democrats	Edgar Elderton	261	31.4	−8.1
Green	Eugene Suggett	46	5.5	+5.5
Labour	Philip Pleece	31	3.7	−0.3
Majority		232	27.9	+10.8
Turnout		831	56.8	−0.4
Conservative hold		Swing		

Okewood
Party	Candidate	Votes	%	±%
Conservative	Vivienne Michael	381	67.8	−2.7
Liberal Democrats	Simon Figg	111	19.8	−9.7
UKIP	Leigh Jones	70	12.5	+12.5
Majority		270	48.0	+7.0
Turnout		562	39.7	+7.9
Conservative hold		Swing		
