= 2008 Broxbourne Borough Council election =

2008 UK local government election

Results of the 2008 Broxbourne Borough Council election

The Broxbourne Council election, 2008 was held on 1 May 2008 to elect council members of the Broxbourne Borough Council, a local government authority in Hertfordshire, England.

== Composition of expiring seats before election ==
Ward	Party	Incumbent Elected	Incumbent	Standing again?
Broxbourne	Conservative	2004	Paul Mason	Yes
Bury Green	Conservative	2004	Martin Kennaugh	Yes
Cheshunt Central	Conservative	2004	Milan Milovanovic	No
Cheshunt North	Conservative	2004	Mark Farrington	No
Flamstead End	Conservative	2004	David Manning	No
Goffs Oak	Conservative	2004	Peter Moule	Yes
Hoddesdon North	Conservative	2004	Lyn White	Yes
Hoddesdon Town	Conservative	2004	Robert Bick	Yes
Rye Park	Conservative	2004	Bren Perryman	Yes
Theobalds	Conservative	2004	Charles Tranham	Yes
Waltham Cross	Conservative	2004	Dennis Clayton	Yes
Wormley / Turnford	Conservative	2004	Christine Mitchell	No

== Election results ==
Broxbourne local election result 2008
Party	Seats	Gains	Losses	Net gain/loss	Seats %	Votes %	Votes	+/−
Conservative	11	0	1	-1	91.66	63.46	13,292	-0.53
Labour	1	1	0	+1	8.34	19.20	4,022	+0.26
BNP	0	0	0	0	0.00	15.34	3,214	+2.01
Liberal Democrats	0	0	0	0	0.00	1.99	417	-0.84

== Results summary ==
An election was held in 12 wards on 1 May 2008. (No election in Rosedale Ward)

This was the first Local Government Election in Broxbourne where the British National Party fielded a "full slate" of candidates

The Labour Party gained 1 seat from the Conservative Party in Waltham Cross Ward.

The new political balance of the council following this election was:

- Conservative 35 seats
- Labour 3 seats

The next Local Government Election was held on 6 May 2010 when seats were contested in all of the 13 wards.

== Ward results ==
Broxbourne Ward Result 1 May 2008
Party	Candidate	Votes	%	±%
Conservative	Paul Mason	1,307	71.03	−6.75
Liberal Democrats	Michael Winrow	224	12.17	−0.63
Labour	Raymond Cook	176	9.57	+0.15
BNP	Joanne Warren	133	7.23	+7.23
Majority		1,083		
Turnout		1,840	37.05	
Conservative hold		Swing		

Bury Green Ward Result 1 May 2008
Party	Candidate	Votes	%	±%
Conservative	Martin Kennaugh	1,031	59.67	+12.14
BNP	Stephen McCole	389	22.51	−9.30
Labour	Shirley McInnes	308	17.82	+2.39
Majority		642		
Turnout		1,728	36.74	
Conservative hold		Swing		

Cheshunt Central Ward Result 1 May 2008
Party	Candidate	Votes	%	±%
Conservative	Judith Clemerson	1,216	66.85	+2.13
Labour	Christopher Simonovitch	305	16.77	+0.60
BNP	Ian Seeby	298	16.38	−2.73
Majority		911		
Turnout		1,819	33.38	
Conservative hold		Swing		

Cheshunt North Ward Result 1 May 2008
Party	Candidate	Votes	%	±%
Conservative	Richard Clemerson	1,089	64.59	+6.36
Labour	Peter Alford	316	18.74	−0.52
BNP	Carolyn Iles	281	16.67	−0.04
Majority		773		
Turnout		1,686	31.09	
Conservative hold		Swing		

Flamstead End Ward Result 1 May 2008
Party	Candidate	Votes	%	±%
Conservative	Martin Lyth	1,101	68.09	+3.00
Labour	Alexander McInnes	290	14.41	−0.50
BNP	Mark Gerrard	283	17.50	−2.50
Majority		811		
Turnout		1,617	32.92	
Conservative hold		Swing		

Goffs Oak Ward Result 1 May 2008
Party	Candidate	Votes	%	±%
Conservative	Peter Moule	1,594	77.23	−11.14
BNP	Wendy Ward	237	11.48	+11.48
Labour	Cherry Robbins	233	11.29	−0.34
Majority		1,357		
Turnout		2,064	33.53	
Conservative hold		Swing		

Hoddesdon North Ward Result 1 May 2008
Party	Candidate	Votes	%	±%
Conservative	Lyn White	1,317	73.00	+1.22
Labour	Edward Hopwood	266	14.75	−0.66
BNP	Colin Whittaker	221	12.25	−0.56
Majority		1,051		
Turnout		1,804	33.12	
Conservative hold		Swing		

Hoddesdon Town Ward Result 1 May 2008
Party	Candidate	Votes	%	±%
Conservative	Robert Bick	863	59.68	−6.14
Labour	Neil Harvey	214	14.80	−1.05
Liberal Democrats	Kirstie De Rivaz	193	13.35	−4.98
BNP	Garry Crowhurst	176	12.17	+12.17
Majority		649		
Turnout		1,446	27.52	
Conservative hold		Swing		

Rye Park Ward Result 1 May 2008
Party	Candidate	Votes	%	±%
Conservative	Bren Perryman	914	56.70	+2.24
Labour	Annette Marples	502	31.14	+3.76
BNP	Ramon Johns	196	12.16	+0.56
Majority		412		
Turnout		1,612	31.93	
Conservative hold		Swing		

Theobalds Ward Result 1 May 2008
Party	Candidate	Votes	%	±%
Conservative	Charles Tranham	1,201	65.13	+2.42
Labour	Ronald McCole	409	22.18	+0.46
BNP	Peter Hall	234	12.69	−2.88
Majority		792		
Turnout		1,844	34.50	
Conservative hold		Swing		

Waltham Cross Ward Result 1 May 2008
Party	Candidate	Votes	%	±%
Labour	Michael Watson	713	41.79	−14.06
Conservative	Dennis Clayton	533	31.24	−12.90
BNP	James Crowhurst	460	26.96	+26.96
Majority		180		
Turnout		1,706	34.20	
Labour gain from Conservative		Swing		

Wormley / Turnford Ward Result 1 May 2008
Party	Candidate	Votes	%	±%
Conservative	James Metcalf	1,126	63.29	−2.71
Labour	Ian Hunter	347	19.51	+4.36
BNP	Christopher Francis	306	17.20	−1.65
Majority		779		
Turnout		1,779	27.13	
Conservative hold		Swing		
