= 2008 Rochford District Council election =

2008 UK local government election

Results of the 2008 Rochford District Council election

Elections to Rochford Council were held on 1 May 2008. One third of the council was up for election and the Conservative party stayed in overall control of the council.

The Conservative party won all 15 seats up for election with no surprises in the results.

After the election, the composition of the council was:

| Party | Seats | ± |
|---|---|---|
| Conservative | 33 | +1 |
| Liberal Democrat | 5 | 0 |
| Rochford District Residents | 1 | 0 |
| Independent | 0 | –1 |

== Election result ==
Rochford local election result 2008
| Party | Seats | Gains | Losses | Net gain/loss | Seats % | Votes % | Votes | +/− |
|---|---|---|---|---|---|---|---|---|
| Conservative | 15 | 1 | 0 | +1 | 100.0 | 61.6 | 9,551 | +12.4% |
| Liberal Democrats | 0 | 0 | 0 | 0 | 0 | 10.0 | 1,549 | -12.8% |
| English Democrat | 0 | 0 | 0 | 0 | 0 | 9.9 | 1,531 | +6.7% |
| Labour | 0 | 0 | 0 | 0 | 0 | 9.6 | 1,481 | -1.7% |
| BNP | 0 | 0 | 0 | 0 | 0 | 3.7 | 571 | -1.1% |
| Green | 0 | 0 | 0 | 0 | 0 | 3.1 | 479 | -2.8% |
| UKIP | 0 | 0 | 0 | 0 | 0 | 1.1 | 174 | +1.1% |
| Independent | 0 | 0 | 1 | -1 | 0 | 1.1 | 163 | -1.7% |

Two Conservative candidates were unopposed.

== Ward results ==
=== Ashingdon and Canewdon ===
Ashingdon and Canewdon
| Party | Candidate | Votes | % | ±% |
|---|---|---|---|---|
| Conservative | Terence Cutmore | 663 | 55.1 | −9.5 |
| Liberal Democrats | Valerie Stanton | 371 | 30.8 | +30.8 |
| Green | Andrew Vaughan | 169 | 14.0 | −21.4 |
| Majority | | 292 | 24.3 | −4.9 |
| Turnout | | 1,203 | 34.4 | +5.0 |
| Conservative hold | | Swing | | |

=== Barling and Sutton ===
Barling and Sutton
| Party | Candidate | Votes | % | ±% |
|---|---|---|---|---|
| Conservative | Michael Steptoe | unopposed | | |
| Conservative gain from Independent | | Swing | | |

=== Foulness and Great Wakering ===
Foulness and Great Wakering
| Party | Candidate | Votes | % | ±% |
|---|---|---|---|---|
| Conservative | Barbara Wilkins | unopposed | | |
| Conservative hold | | Swing | | |

=== Hockley Central ===
Hockley Central
| Party | Candidate | Votes | % | ±% |
|---|---|---|---|---|
| Conservative | Jeremy Thomass | 1,302 | 80.7 | |
| Labour | David Thompson | 312 | 19.3 | |
| Majority | | 990 | 61.4 | |
| Turnout | | 1,614 | 31.8 | |
| Conservative hold | | Swing | | |

=== Hockley North ===
Hockley North
| Party | Candidate | Votes | % | ±% |
|---|---|---|---|---|
| Conservative | Michael Carter | 421 | 73.3 | −3.5 |
| BNP | Mark Cooling | 92 | 16.0 | +16.0 |
| Labour | Sheila Downward | 61 | 10.6 | −12.6 |
| Majority | | 329 | 57.3 | +3.7 |
| Turnout | | 574 | 34.7 | −4.1 |
| Conservative hold | | Swing | | |

=== Hocklet West ===
Hockley West
| Party | Candidate | Votes | % | ±% |
|---|---|---|---|---|
| Conservative | Malcolm Maddocks | 401 | 71.1 | |
| Independent | Brian Hazlewood | 163 | 28.9 | |
| Majority | | 238 | 42.2 | |
| Turnout | | 564 | 35.0 | |
| Conservative hold | | Swing | | |

=== Hullbridge ===
Hullbridge
| Party | Candidate | Votes | % | ±% |
|---|---|---|---|---|
| Conservative | Peter Robinson | 1,122 | 58.3 | +8.8 |
| BNP | Robert Green | 479 | 24.9 | −0.3 |
| Labour | Angelina Marriott | 325 | 16.9 | −0.1 |
| Majority | | 643 | 33.4 | +9.1 |
| Turnout | | 1,926 | 36.3 | +1.1 |
| Conservative hold | | Swing | | |

=== Lodge ===
Lodge
| Party | Candidate | Votes | % | ±% |
|---|---|---|---|---|
| Conservative | David Merrick | 549 | 50.3 | +6.5 |
| English Democrat | David Merrick | 264 | 24.2 | −5.9 |
| UKIP | Janet Davies | 174 | 15.9 | +15.9 |
| Green | Neil Kirsh | 105 | 9.6 | +4.2 |
| Majority | | 285 | 26.1 | +12.4 |
| Turnout | | 1,092 | 34.5 | +1.4 |
| Conservative hold | | Swing | | |

=== Rayleigh Central ===
Rayleigh Central
| Party | Candidate | Votes | % | ±% |
|---|---|---|---|---|
| Conservative | Antony Humphries | 882 | 74.5 | +13.5 |
| Liberal Democrats | Michael Nobes | 302 | 25.5 | −0.9 |
| Majority | | 580 | 49.0 | +14.4 |
| Turnout | | 1,184 | 35.3 | +2.6 |
| Conservative hold | | Swing | | |

=== Rochford ===
Rochford (2)
| Party | Candidate | Votes | % | ±% |
|---|---|---|---|---|
| Conservative | Gillian Lucas-Gill | 864 | | |
| Conservative | Keith Gordon | 796 | | |
| Labour | David Lench | 361 | | |
| Labour | Myra Weir | 357 | | |
| English Democrat | Margaret Stoll | 347 | | |
| Green | Douglas Copping | 205 | | |
| Turnout | | 2,930 | 29.5 | +2.6 |
| Conservative hold | | Swing | | |
| Conservative hold | | Swing | | |

=== Sweyne Park ===
Sweyne Park
| Party | Candidate | Votes | % | ±% |
|---|---|---|---|---|
| Conservative | Joan Mockford | 516 | 46.7 | −1.5 |
| Liberal Democrats | Patricia Putt | 353 | 31.9 | −19.9 |
| English Democrat | Kim Gandy | 236 | 21.4 | +21.4 |
| Majority | | 163 | 14.8 | |
| Turnout | | 1,105 | 33.7 | +8.6 |
| Conservative hold | | Swing | | |

=== Trinity ===
Trinity
| Party | Candidate | Votes | % | ±% |
|---|---|---|---|---|
| Conservative | Keith Gibbs | 562 | 51.1 | −10.5 |
| English Democrat | John Hayter | 372 | 33.8 | +33.8 |
| Liberal Democrats | Mark Pearson | 101 | 9.2 | −21.7 |
| Labour | Peter Lickfold | 65 | 5.9 | +5.9 |
| Majority | | 190 | 17.3 | −13.4 |
| Turnout | | 1,100 | 37.9 | +3.1 |
| Conservative hold | | Swing | | |

=== Wheatley ===
Wheatley
| Party | Candidate | Votes | % | ±% |
|---|---|---|---|---|
| Conservative | John Pullen' | 829 | 77.7 | +7.2 |
| Liberal Democrats | Corey Vost | 238 | 22.3 | −7.2 |
| Majority | | 591 | 55.4 | +14.4 |
| Turnout | | 1,067 | 34.1 | −0.3 |
| Conservative hold | | Swing | | |

=== Whitehouse ===
Whitehouse
| Party | Candidate | Votes | % | ±% |
|---|---|---|---|---|
| Conservative | Simon Smith | 641 | 56.4 | −7.0 |
| English Democrat | Kenneth Bennett | 312 | 27.4 | +27.4 |
| Liberal Democrats | Elena Black | 184 | 16.2 | −20.4 |
| Majority | | 329 | 29.0 | +2.2 |
| Turnout | | 1,137 | 36.2 | −0.9 |
| Conservative hold | | Swing | | |
