= 2008 Purbeck District Council election =

2008 UK local government election

Results of the 2008 Purbeck District Council election

Elections to Purbeck District Council were held on 1 May 2008. Nine of the twenty-four seats on the council were up for election and the council stayed under no overall control. Overall turnout was 44.86%.

A big issue in the election was housing with much criticism of plans to build over five thousand homes in the district by 2026. The nominations for the election saw an unusual event when Liberal Democrat candidate Alexandra Brenton signed the nomination papers for her friend and Labour Party candidate Selby Bennett. Two seats were contested in Lytchett Matravers after Liberal Democrat councillor Michael Peacock stood down in February.

The results saw the Liberal Democrat party gained Wareham and Wool wards from the Conservative Party to pull level on the council. The Conservative Party took Swanage South from Liberal Democrat Colin Bright who had defected from the Conservatives the previous month.

After the election, the composition of the council was:

- Conservative 11
- Liberal Democrat 11
- Independent 2

== Election result ==
Purbeck local election result 2008
Party	Seats	Gains	Losses	Net gain/loss	Seats %	Votes %	Votes	+/−
Liberal Democrats	5	2	1	+1	55.6	45.6	6,174	+3.8
Conservative	4	1	2	-1	44.4	47.3	6,399	+8.7
Labour	0	0	0	0	0.0	4.8	653	-2.3
Independent	0	0	0	0	0.0	2.2	304	-3.2

== Ward results ==
Lytchett Matravers (2)
Party	Candidate	Votes	%	±%
Liberal Democrats	Martyn Colvey	785		
Conservative	David Cross	729		
Liberal Democrats	Alexandra Brenton	715		
Conservative	Colin Gibb	692		
Labour	James Selby Bennett	50		
Turnout		2,971	52.7	+0.4
Liberal Democrats hold		Swing		
Conservative hold		Swing		

Lytchett Minster and Upton East
Party	Candidate	Votes	%	±%
Liberal Democrats	Wendy Starr	692	57.6	−4.1
Conservative	Simon Williams	509	42.4	+4.1
Majority		183	15.2	−8.2
Turnout		1,201	39.1	−0.8
Liberal Democrats hold		Swing		

Lytchett Minster and Upton West
Party	Candidate	Votes	%	±%
Conservative	Paul Johns	829	65.3	+15.8
Liberal Democrats	Mark Howlett	391	30.8	−19.7
Labour	Ruth Cade	50	3.9	+3.9
Majority		438	24.5	
Turnout		1,270	42.6	−6.3
Conservative hold		Swing		

St Martin
Party	Candidate	Votes	%	±%
Liberal Democrats	Beryl Ezzard	563	56.2	−0.9
Conservative	Jane Thomas	438	43.8	+10.3
Majority		125	12.4	−11.2
Turnout		1,001	46.5	+0.9
Liberal Democrats hold		Swing		

Swanage North
Party	Candidate	Votes	%	±%
Conservative	Gloria Marsh	917	59.3	+8.2
Liberal Democrats	Philippa Keeling	497	32.1	+7.1
Labour	Margaret Storey	132	8.5	−2.3
Majority		420	27.2	+1.1
Turnout		1,546	46.2	−3.4
Conservative hold		Swing		

Swanage South
Party	Candidate	Votes	%	±%
Conservative	Alison Patrick	932	50.6	+10.6
Liberal Democrats	Colin Bright	561	30.5	+1.1
Labour	Marilyn Larthe de Langladure	348	18.9	+0.6
Majority		371	20.1	+9.5
Turnout		1,841	38.5	0.0
Conservative gain from Liberal Democrats		Swing		

Wareham
Party	Candidate	Votes	%	±%
Liberal Democrats	Keith Critchley	1,245	57.6	−4.6
Conservative	Roy Anderson	915	42.4	+4.6
Majority		330	15.2	−9.2
Turnout		2,160	47.0	+4.1
Liberal Democrats gain from Conservative		Swing		

Wool
Party	Candidate	Votes	%	±%
Liberal Democrats	Graham Holmes	725	47.1	+0.7
Conservative	Malcolm Shakesby	438	28.4	−6.1
Independent	Rosemary Grey-Hodder	304	19.7	+19.7
Labour	Rosemary Phillips	73	4.7	−2.6
Majority		287	18.7	+6.8
Turnout		1,540	46.5	+2.9
Liberal Democrats gain from Conservative		Swing		
