= 2008 Colchester Borough Council election =

2008 UK local government election

- 1 May 2008

20 out of 60 seats to Colchester Borough Council 31 seats needed for a majority
- Turnout: 34.5% (▼0.2%)
	First party	Second party
Party	Conservative	Liberal Democrats
Last election	30 seats, 41.8%	21 seats, 29.3%
Seats before	32	19
Seats won	7	9
Seats after	27	23
Seat change	▼5	▲4
Popular vote	13,142	13,111
Percentage	37.3%	37.2%
Swing	▼4.5%	▲7.9%
	Third party	Fourth party
Party	Labour	Independent
Last election	6 seats, 16.3%	3 seats, 3.1%
Seats before	6	3
Seats won	3	1
Seats after	7	3
Seat change	▲1	Steady
Popular vote	4,593	1,247
Percentage	13.0%	3.5%
Swing	▼3.3%	▲0.4%
- Winner of each seat at the 2008 Colchester Borough Council election.
Leader before election
Conservative
Leader after election
Anne Turrell
Liberal Democrats
No overall control (Note: Liberal Democrats–Labour–Independent coalition.)

The 2008 Colchester Borough Council election took place on 1 May 2008 to elect members of Colchester Borough Council in Essex, England. One third of the council was up for election and the Conservative Party lost overall control of the council to no overall control.

After the election, the composition of the council was:

- Conservative 27
- Liberal Democrats 23
- Labour 7
- Independent 3

== Background ==
After the last election in 2007 the Conservatives held half of the seats on the council with 30 councillors, while the Liberal Democrats had 21 seats, Labour 6 seats and there were 3 independents. However, in July 2007, 2 Liberal Democrat councilors, Craig and Terry Sutton, defected to the Conservatives after falling out with the local Liberal Democrat Member of parliament Bob Russell over a new community stadium. This gave the Conservatives a majority on the council with 32 of the 60 seats.

20 seats were contested at the election, with the Conservatives defending 12 of the seats. A total of 82 candidates stood at the election, including full slates from the Conservative, Liberal Democrat, Labour and Green parties, along with one candidate from the British National Party.

== Summary ==
=== Election result ===
The Conservatives lost their majority on the council after losing 5 seats, 4 to the Liberal Democrats and 1 to Labour. Among those who lost seats were 2 members of the Conservative council cabinet, while Craig Sutton in Berechurch lost his seat to Labour after having defected to the Conservatives from the Liberal Democrats in 2007. Conservative defeats were attributed to high levels of housebuilding in the area, with the Conservatives dropping to 27 seats, while the Liberal Democrats rose to 23 seats and Labour went up to 7 seats. Meanwhile, the British National Party came fourth in High Woods ward with 131 votes after putting up the party's first candidate for Colchester council. Overall turnout at the election was 34.5%.

Following the election the Liberal Democrat, Labour and independent groups made a deal to take control over the council from the Conservatives, with Liberal Democrat Anne Turrell becoming the new leader of the council.

2008 Colchester Borough Council election
Party	This election				Full council			This election		
Party	Candidates	Seats	Net	Seats %	Other	Total	Total %	Votes	Votes %	+/−
Conservative	20	7	▼5	35.0	20	27	45.0	13,142	37.3	–4.5
Liberal Democrats	20	9	▲4	45.0	14	23	38.3	13,111	37.2	+7.9
Labour	20	3	▲1	15.0	4	7	11.7	4,593	13.0	–3.3
Independent	1	1	Steady	5.0	2	3	5.0	1,247	3.5	+0.4
Green	20	0	Steady	0.0	0	0	0.0	3,012	8.5	–1.0
BNP	1	0	Steady	0.0	0	0	0.0	131	0.4	N/A

== Ward results ==
=== Berechurch ===
Berechurch
Party	Candidate	Votes	%	±%
Labour	Kim Naish	735	37.0	−12.7
Liberal Democrats	John Stevens	682	34.3	+8.5
Conservative	Craig Sutton*	435	21.9	+3.1
Green	Philippa Lane	136	6.8	+1.0
Majority		53	2.7	−21.2
Turnout		1,988	33.5	+0.8
Registered electors		5,939		
Labour gain from Conservative		Swing	▼10.6	

=== Castle ===
Castle
Party	Candidate	Votes	%	±%
Liberal Democrats	William Spyvee*	1,111	45.2	+4.2
Green	Peter Lynn	779	31.7	−0.6
Conservative	Darius Laws	434	17.6	−2.9
Labour	John Cooke	136	5.5	−0.7
Majority		332	13.5	+4.8
Turnout		2,460	38.1	+0.7
Registered electors		6,460		
Liberal Democrats hold		Swing	▲2.4	

=== Dedham & Langham ===
Dedham & Langham
Party	Candidate	Votes	%	±%
Conservative	John Garnett*	895	82.8	+3.8
Liberal Democrats	Carolyn Catney	102	9.4	−4.9
Labour	Andrew Maxwell	46	4.3	−2.4
Green	Sandra Moog	38	3.5	+3.5
Majority		793	73.4	+8.8
Turnout		1,081	45.6	−8.1
Registered electors		2,372		
Conservative hold		Swing	▲4.4	

=== East Donyland ===
East Donyland
Party	Candidate	Votes	%	±%
Labour	Michael Lilley	351	42.8	−1.1
Conservative	Peter Hare	344	42.0	+11.7
Liberal Democrats	Barry Woodward	67	8.2	−1.3
Green	Tracy Lee-Newman	58	7.1	N/A
Majority		7	0.9	−12.6
Turnout		820	41.2	−7.7
Registered electors		1,992		
Labour hold		Swing	▼6.4	

No Independent candidate as previous (16.3%).

=== Harbour ===
Harbour
Party	Candidate	Votes	%	±%
Liberal Democrats	Justin Knight*	727	59.3	−4.5
Conservative	Barry McConnell	271	22.1	+4.0
Labour	Michael Gilheany	141	11.5	−0.1
Green	Stephen Ford	88	7.2	+0.8
Majority		456	37.2	−8.5
Turnout		1,227	27.7	−2.0
Registered electors		4,440		
Liberal Democrats hold		Swing	▼4.3	

=== Highwoods ===
Highwoods
Party	Candidate	Votes	%	±%
Independent	Beverley Oxford*	1,247	59.5	+6.9
Conservative	Anne Allan	320	15.3	−6.1
Liberal Democrats	John Baker	237	11.3	−4.0
BNP	Patrick Sullivan	131	6.3	N/A
Labour	Jordan Newell	97	4.6	−1.8
Green	Robert Spence	63	3.0	−1.4
Majority		927	44.2	+12.9
Turnout		2,095	31.4	+0.5
Registered electors		6,681		
Independent hold		Swing	▲6.5	

=== Lexden ===
Lexden
Party	Candidate	Votes	%	±%
Conservative	Michael Hardy	1,079	62.3	−3.5
Liberal Democrats	John Loxley	477	27.6	+7.8
Green	Clare Palmer	104	6.0	+0.6
Labour	Adam Fox	71	4.1	−1.2
Majority		602	34.8	−11.2
Turnout		1,731	41.2	−5.9
Registered electors		4,217		
Conservative hold		Swing	▼5.7	

=== Marks Tey ===
Marks Tey
Party	Candidate	Votes	%	±%
Conservative	Elizabeth Blundell	450	63.7	+2.2
Labour	John Wood	123	17.4	+4.8
Liberal Democrats	Josephine Hayes	88	12.5	−3.5
Green	Roger Bamforth	45	6.4	+6.4
Majority		327	46.3	+0.7
Turnout		706	34.5	−6.5
Registered electors		2,054		
Conservative hold		Swing	▼1.3	

=== Mile End ===
Mile End
Party	Candidate	Votes	%	±%
Liberal Democrats	Martin Goss	1,500	61.1	+14.0
Conservative	Brian Jarvis*	790	32.2	−11.2
Green	Mary Bryan	84	3.4	−0.9
Labour	Rossanna Trudgian	83	3.4	−1.7
Majority		710	28.9	+25.1
Turnout		2,457	39.0	−0.5
Registered electors		6,321		
Liberal Democrats gain from Conservative		Swing	▲12.6	

=== New Town ===
New Town
Party	Candidate	Votes	%	±%
Liberal Democrats	Peter Higgins	1,046	62.6	+7.0
Conservative	Glenn Bath	277	16.6	−0.7
Green	Linda Wonnacott	198	11.8	−4.3
Labour	Luke Dopson	150	9.0	−2.0
Majority		769	46.0	+7.7
Turnout		1,671	27.5	+0.5
Registered electors		6,090		
Liberal Democrats hold		Swing	▲3.9	

=== Prettygate ===
Prettygate
Party	Candidate	Votes	%	±%
Conservative	Beverley Davies	1,197	45.5	−8.7
Liberal Democrats	Paul Ost	1,167	44.3	+10.5
Labour	Michael Dale	142	5.4	−1.6
Green	Peter Appleton	127	4.8	−0.2
Majority		30	1.1	−19.3
Turnout		2,633	44.2	+0.5
Registered electors		5,969		
Conservative hold		Swing	▼9.6	

=== St. Andrew's ===
St. Andrew's
Party	Candidate	Votes	%	±%
Labour	Tina Dopson*	837	51.2	−10.4
Liberal Democrats	Mark Warner	496	30.3	+11.3
Conservative	Alexander Wilson	240	14.7	−0.4
Green	Andrew Senter	63	3.9	−0.4
Majority		341	20.8	−21.8
Turnout		1,636	24.9	+0.1
Registered electors		6,581		
Labour hold		Swing	▼10.9	

=== St. Anne's ===
St. Anne's
Party	Candidate	Votes	%	±%
Liberal Democrats	Helen Chuah*	1,049	56.5	+7.2
Conservative	Stephen Levy	393	21.2	+3.0
Labour	Robert Fisher	272	14.7	−12.3
Green	Mervyn Carter	141	7.6	+2.1
Majority		656	35.4	+13.1
Turnout		1,855	28.7	−3.5
Registered electors		6,482		
Liberal Democrats hold		Swing	▲2.1	

=== St. John's ===
St. John's
Party	Candidate	Votes	%	±%
Liberal Democrats	Paul Smith*	1,244	71.6	+9.8
Conservative	Glenn Granger	389	22.4	−6.8
Labour	Scott Harris	59	3.4	−1.2
Green	Tobie Glenny	45	2.6	−1.8
Majority		855	49.2	+16.7
Turnout		1,737	42.0	−1.4
Registered electors		4,139		
Liberal Democrats hold		Swing	▲8.3	

=== Shrub End ===
Shrub End
Party	Candidate	Votes	%	±%
Liberal Democrats	David Offen	822	42.9	+8.4
Conservative	Roger Buston*	811	42.3	+3.8
Labour	Bruce Tuxford	196	10.2	−11.5
Green	Walter Schwarz	89	4.6	−0.8
Majority		11	0.6	N/A
Turnout		1,918	30.0	−1.2
Registered electors		6,399		
Liberal Democrats gain from Conservative		Swing	▲2.3	

=== Stanway ===
Stanway
Party	Candidate	Votes	%	±%
Liberal Democrats	Laura Sykes	1,118	45.6	−6.6
Conservative	Andrew Ellis*	1,063	43.3	+4.7
Labour	Carole Spademan	176	7.2	+1.1
Green	Pamela Nelson	96	3.9	+0.7
Majority		55	2.2	−11.4
Turnout		2,453	38.8	+1.1
Registered electors		6,339		
Liberal Democrats gain from Conservative		Swing	▼5.6	

=== Tiptree ===
Tiptree
Party	Candidate	Votes	%	±%
Conservative	Richard Martin*	1,116	60.5	−4.9
Liberal Democrats	Jonathan Longman	345	18.7	+10.4
Labour	Audrey Spencer	242	13.1	−5.1
Green	Katherine Bamforth	142	7.7	−0.4
Majority		771	41.8	−5.4
Turnout		1,845	30.4	+0.2
Registered electors		6,092		
Conservative hold		Swing	▼7.7	

=== West Mersea ===
West Mersea
Party	Candidate	Votes	%	±%
Conservative	John Bouckley*	1,583	77.7	+3.6
Liberal Democrats	Jennifer Stevens	195	9.6	−0.3
Labour	Barbara Nichols	139	6.8	−1.9
Green	Beverley Maltby	120	5.9	−1.4
Majority		1,388	68.1	+3.8
Turnout		2,037	34.5	−0.5
Registered electors		5,925		
Conservative hold		Swing	▲2.0	

=== Wivenhoe Cross ===
Wivenhoe Cross
Party	Candidate	Votes	%	±%
Liberal Democrats	Jonathan Manning	506	48.4	+5.9
Conservative	Eugene Kraft*	377	36.1	−3.8
Green	Maria Iacovou	83	7.9	−1.0
Labour	Janet Smith	79	7.6	−1.0
Majority		129	12.3	+9.7
Turnout		1,045	29.7	+2.4
Registered electors		3,525		
Liberal Democrats gain from Conservative		Swing	▲4.9	

=== Wivenhoe Quay ===
Wivenhoe Quay
Party	Candidate	Votes	%	±%
Conservative	Ann Quarrie*	678	36.8	+1.1
Labour	Josephine Richardson	518	28.1	−7.8
Green	Christopher Fox	513	27.9	+7.4
Liberal Democrats	Claire Rodgers	132	7.2	−0.9
Majority		160	8.7	N/A
Turnout		1,841	43.8	−0.6
Registered electors		4,219		
Conservative hold		Swing	▲4.5	

== By-elections ==
=== Birch and Winstree ===
A by-election took place in Birch and Winstree ward on 4 December 2008 after the death of the Conservative councillor Peter Crowe. Andrew Ellis retained the seat for the Conservatives by a majority of 322 votes.

Birch and Winstree: 4 December 2008
Party	Candidate	Votes	%	±%
Conservative	Andrew Ellis	745	58.1	−12.1
Liberal Democrats	Jonathan Longman	423	33.0	+14.1
Labour	James Spencer	83	6.5	+0.4
Green	Katherine Bamforth	32	2.5	−2.5
Majority		322	25.1	
Turnout		1,283	29.3	
Conservative hold		Swing		
