= 2008 Amber Valley Borough Council election =

Council election in Derbyshire, England

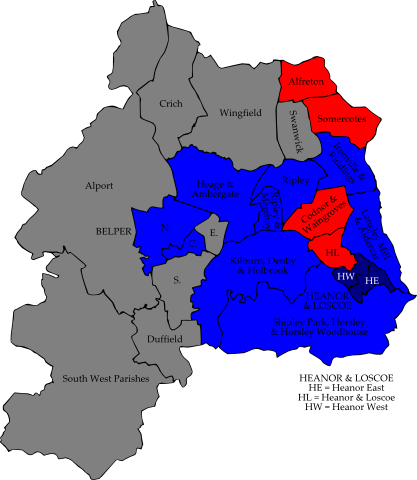
Map of the results of the 2008 Amber Valley council election. Conservatives in blue, Labour in red and British National Party in dark blue. Wards in grey were not contested in 2008.

Elections to Amber Valley Borough Council in Derbyshire, England were held on 1 May 2008. One third of the council was up for election and the Conservative Party held overall control of the council.

The election saw the British National Party gain two seats from the Labour Party in Heanor West and Heanor East and come within one vote in Heanor and Loscoe ward.

After the election, the composition of the council was:

- Conservative 29
- Labour 14
- British National Party 2

== Election result ==
Amber Valley local election result 2008
Party	Seats	Gains	Losses	Net gain/loss	Seats %	Votes %	Votes	+/−
Conservative	9	1	0	+1	60.0	47.8	11,489	-0.7%
Labour	4	0	3	-3	26.7	32.9	7,916	+3.5%
BNP	2	2	0	+2	13.3	12.2	2,936	+7.4%
Liberal Democrats	0	0	0	0	0	5.1	1,222	-8.0%
Green	0	0	0	0	0	2.1	494	+0.9%

== Ward results ==
Alfreton
Party	Candidate	Votes	%	±%
Labour	Marlene Bennett	872	48.2	−0.3
Conservative	David Cantrill	731	40.4	+14.9
Liberal Democrats	Paul Gibbons	206	11.4	+1.9
Majority		141	7.8	−15.2
Turnout		1,809	29.1	−4.5
Labour hold		Swing		

Belper Central
Party	Candidate	Votes	%	±%
Conservative	John Nelson	894	60.7	+8.1
Green	Dave Wells	292	19.8	+19.8
Labour	Ben Hobbs	286	19.4	−12.9
Majority		602	40.9	+20.6
Turnout		1,472	35.2	−0.9
Conservative hold		Swing		

Belper North
Party	Candidate	Votes	%	±%
Conservative	Alan Cox	797	51.0	+10.2
Labour	Ben Bellamy	286	18.3	−4.7
Liberal Democrats	Richard Salmon	279	17.8	−15.4
Green	Colin Grimley	202	12.9	+12.9
Majority		511	32.7	+28.1
Turnout		1,564	38.9	−0.7
Conservative hold		Swing		

Codnor & Waingroves
Party	Candidate	Votes	%	±%
Labour	Chris Emmas-Williams	573	41.7	−11.0
Conservative	Robert Philips-Forsyth	572	41.7	+8.7
BNP	Alan Warner	228	16.6	+16.6
Majority		1	0.01	−19.7
Turnout		1,373	34.4	+1.4
Labour hold		Swing		

Heage & Ambergate
Party	Candidate	Votes	%	±%
Conservative	Juliette Blake	1,000	68.4	+12.1
Labour	Peter Arnold	463	31.6	+1.0
Majority		537	36.8	+11.1
Turnout		1,463	36.8	−2.8
Conservative hold		Swing		

Heanor & Loscoe
Party	Candidate	Votes	%	±%
Labour	Alan Longdon	513	35.6	−7.8
BNP	Paul Snell	512	35.5	+4.4
Conservative	Jade Wiltshire	417	28.9	+9.5
Majority		1	0.1	−12.2
Turnout		1,442	35.4	−6.6
Labour hold		Swing		

Heanor East
Party	Candidate	Votes	%	±%
BNP	Cliff Roper	537	36.5	+36.5
Conservative	Linda Edwards-Milsom	482	32.7	−3.9
Labour	Kenneth Armstrong	454	30.8	−13.6
Majority		55	3.8	N/A
Turnout		1,473	32.8	+3.8
BNP gain from Labour		Swing		

Heanor West
Party	Candidate	Votes	%	±%
BNP	Lewis Allesbrook	727	39.6	+8.4
Labour	Celia Cox	560	30.5	−1.5
Conservative	Steven Grainger	412	22.4	+8.0
Liberal Democrats	Sally McIntosh	137	7.5	+7.5
Majority		167	9.1	N/A
Turnout		1,836	38.9	−3.1
BNP gain from Labour		Swing		

Ironville & Riddings
Party	Candidate	Votes	%	±%
Conservative	Jack Brown	900	58.6	+16.1
Labour	Robert Johnston	636	41.4	−3.6
Majority		264	17.2	
Turnout		1,536	33.6	−0.4
Conservative hold		Swing		

Kilburn, Denby & Holbrook
Party	Candidate	Votes	%	±%
Conservative	Norman Bull	1,199	55.2	+7.9
Labour	Timothy Benson	441	20.3	−4.3
Liberal Democrats	John Banks	277	12.8	+0.7
BNP	Cyril Smith	254	11.7	−4.3
Majority		758	34.9	+12.2
Turnout		2,171	35.3	−2.7
Conservative hold		Swing		

Langley Mill & Aldercar
Party	Candidate	Votes	%	±%
Conservative	Terry Thorpe	423	44.3	+8.9
Labour	Eileen Hamilton	408	42.8	−5.9
Liberal Democrats	Keith Falconbridge	123	12.9	+12.9
Majority		15	1.5	N/A
Turnout		954	22.9	−2.1
Conservative gain from Labour		Swing		

Ripley
Party	Candidate	Votes	%	±%
Conservative	David Bowley	1,259	59.8	+16.9
Labour	Charles Cutting	646	30.7	−10.4
Liberal Democrats	Christopher Brown	200	9.5	−6.5
Majority		613	29.1	+27.3
Turnout		2,105	31.0	−3.3
Conservative hold		Swing		

Ripley & Marehay
Party	Candidate	Votes	%	±%
Conservative	Ron Ashton	827	49.3	+14.0
Labour	Lyndsey Cox	482	28.7	−13.6
BNP	Ken Cooper	369	22.0	+10.3
Majority		345	20.6	+13.6
Turnout		1,678	36.1	−0.6
Conservative hold		Swing		

Shipley Park, Horsley & Horsley Woodhouse
Party	Candidate	Votes	%	±%
Conservative	Nigel Mills	1,188	65.1	+6.6
Labour	Eric Lancashire	636	34.9	−6.6
Majority		552	30.2	+13.2
Turnout		1,824	40.0	−2.0
Conservative hold		Swing		

Somercotes
Party	Candidate	Votes	%	±%
Labour	John McCabe	660	48.6	−14.7
Conservative	Sally West	388	28.6	−8.1
BNP	John Dudley	309	22.8	+22.8
Majority		272	20.0	−6.6
Turnout		1,357	29.9	+1.9
Labour hold		Swing		
