= 2008 Watford Borough Council election =

2008 UK local government election

Results of the 2008 Watford Borough Council election

Elections to Watford Borough Council were held on 1 May 2008. One third of the council was up for election and the Liberal Democrats stayed in overall control of the council.

The election saw only one seat change hands, Vicarage ward saw the Labour Party gain the seat from the Liberal Democrats. However the Liberal Democrats remained firmly in control of the council.

After the election, the composition of the council was:

- Liberal Democrat 27
- Conservative 3
- Green 3
- Labour 3

== Council election result ==
Watford local election result 2008
Party	Seats	Gains	Losses	Net gain/loss	Seats %	Votes %	Votes	+/−
Liberal Democrats	9	0	1	-1	75.0	44.7	9,660	-2.3
Conservative	1	0	0	0	8.3	26.6	5,741	+2.4
Labour	1	1	0	+1	8.3	17.7	3,828	+0.2
Green	1	0	0	0	8.3	10.8	2,340	+0.2
Independent	0	0	0	0	0.0	0.1	18	-0.6

== Ward results ==
Callowland
Party	Candidate	Votes	%	±%
Green	Kenneth Brodhurst	729	54.3	−9.6
Labour	Ian Cloke	234	17.4	+3.3
Liberal Democrats	Patricia Gollop	193	14.4	+3.4
Conservative	Patricia Lees	187	13.9	+2.9
Majority		495	36.9	−12.9
Turnout		1,343	25.6	−3.1
Green hold		Swing		

Central
Party	Candidate	Votes	%	±%
Liberal Democrats	Rabi Martins	620	43.1	−3.4
Labour	Joanna Grindrod	323	22.4	−5.4
Green	Clare Pitkin	278	19.3	+8.0
Conservative	Richard Bamford	219	15.2	+0.8
Majority		297	20.7	+2.0
Turnout		1,440	26.8	+0.2
Liberal Democrats hold		Swing		

Holywell
Party	Candidate	Votes	%	±%
Liberal Democrats	Emma Hines-Randall	754	43.0	+4.8
Labour	Fred Grindrod	736	41.9	−8.8
Conservative	Carole Bamford	191	10.9	+3.3
Green	Helen Wynne	74	4.2	+0.6
Majority		18	1.1	
Turnout		1,755	30.8	−2.0
Liberal Democrats hold		Swing		

Leggatts
Party	Candidate	Votes	%	±%
Liberal Democrats	Qureshi Fawziyyah	634	33.7	+5.3
Conservative	Karen Best	505	26.8	−1.7
Green	Ian Brandon	464	24.6	+1.8
Labour	Geoffrey O'Connell	280	14.9	+3.0
Majority		129	6.9	
Turnout		1,883	35.8	+1.2
Liberal Democrats hold		Swing		

Meriden
Party	Candidate	Votes	%	±%
Liberal Democrats	Janice Brown	717	47.4	−9.6
Conservative	Pamela Bell	416	27.5	+8.1
Labour	Daniel Scott	299	19.8	+0.9
Green	Ian Pitkin	81	5.4	+0.6
Majority		301	19.9	−17.7
Turnout		1,513	28.5	−1.2
Liberal Democrats hold		Swing		

Nascot
Party	Candidate	Votes	%	±%
Conservative	Andrew Mortimer	1,018	44.9	+2.6
Liberal Democrats	Russell Willson	971	42.8	−3.2
Green	Sally Ivins	137	6.0	−0.8
Labour	Marion Chambers	125	5.5	+0.5
Independent	Antony Cooke	18	0.8	+0.8
Majority		47	2.1	
Turnout		2,269	41.3	−0.6
Conservative hold		Swing		

Oxhey
Party	Candidate	Votes	%	±%
Liberal Democrats	Anthony Poole	1,070	60.1	−8.1
Conservative	Sarah Son	460	25.8	+4.7
Labour	Michael Jones	135	7.6	+0.8
Green	Neal Webber	115	6.5	+2.6
Majority		610	34.3	−12.8
Turnout		1,780	35.4	+0.9
Liberal Democrats hold		Swing		

Park
Party	Candidate	Votes	%	±%
Liberal Democrats	George Derbyshire	1,366	51.5	+0.1
Conservative	Malcolm Meerabux	1,076	40.6	−0.6
Labour	Mohammed Riaz	127	4.8	+0.6
Green	Alex Mason	82	3.1	−0.1
Majority		290	10.9	+0.7
Turnout		2,651	47.3	−1.1
Liberal Democrats hold		Swing		

Stanborough
Party	Candidate	Votes	%	±%
Liberal Democrats	Andrew Wylie	917	56.7	−6.1
Conservative	Jonathon Cordell	373	23.1	+2.7
Labour	Abeyemi Oshunniyi	241	14.9	+2.4
Green	Kevin Pettifer	87	5.4	+1.1
Majority		544	33.6	−8.8
Turnout		1,618	31.2	−0.2
Liberal Democrats hold		Swing		

Tudor
Party	Candidate	Votes	%	±%
Liberal Democrats	Hugh O'Hanlon	847	46.9	−1.0
Conservative	Richard Southern	695	38.5	+2.1
Labour	Pauline May	192	10.6	+0.3
Green	Rachel Neill	72	4.0	−1.4
Majority		152	8.4	−3.1
Turnout		1,806	38.5	−1.2
Liberal Democrats hold		Swing		

Vicarage
Party	Candidate	Votes	%	±%
Labour	Mohammed Tanveer Taj	911	43.4	+3.4
Liberal Democrats	Abrar Shah	791	37.7	−5.2
Conservative	David Ealey	256	12.2	−0.1
Green	David Degen	141	6.7	+1.9
Majority		120	5.7	
Turnout		2,099	39.2	+2.9
Labour gain from Liberal Democrats		Swing		

Woodside
Party	Candidate	Votes	%	±%
Liberal Democrats	Ian Brown	780	54.5	−8.5
Conservative	Joseph Harrison	345	24.1	+8.2
Labour	John Young	225	15.7	−0.2
Green	Caryn Argun	80	5.6	+0.3
Majority		435	30.4	−16.7
Turnout		1,430	28.2	+0.2
Liberal Democrats hold		Swing		
