= 2008 Adur District Council election =

2008 UK local government election

Map of the results of the 2008 Adur council election. Conservatives in blue and Residents in white.

Elections to Adur District Council in West Sussex, England were held on 1 May 2008. Half of the council was up for election and the Conservative Party held overall control of the council.

Four extra seats were up for election due to councillors stepping down. No seats changed parties in the election with the Conservative party remaining the dominant party on the council.

After the election, the composition of the council was:

- Conservative 26
- Independent 2
- Liberal Democrat 1

== Results ==
Adur local election result 2008
Party	Seats	Gains	Losses	Net gain/loss	Seats %	Votes %	Votes	+/−
Conservative	16	0	0	0	88.9	50.5	10,064	+1.2%
Shoreham Beach Residents Association	2	0	0	0	11.1	8.4	1,674	+2.5%
Liberal Democrats	0	0	0	0	0	22.9	4,571	-4.0%
Labour	0	0	0	0	0	11.0	2,185	0.0%
Green	0	0	0	0	0	4.2	839	-2.7%
UKIP	0	0	0	0	0	3.0	591	+3.0%

== Ward results ==
Buckingham
Party	Candidate	Votes	%	±%
Conservative	Debbie Kennard	760	71.0	
Liberal Democrats	Jan Kimber	127	11.9	
Labour	Julie Pearce	93	8.7	
Green	Vincent Tilsley	91	8.5	
Majority		633	59.1	
Turnout		1,071	34	
Conservative hold		Swing		

Churchill (2)
Party	Candidate	Votes	%	±%
Conservative	Pat Beresford	506		
Conservative	Ann Terry	443		
Liberal Democrats	Kim Bonnett	430		
Liberal Democrats	Stephen Martin	408		
Labour	Michael Thornton	117		
Turnout		1,904	30	
Conservative hold		Swing		
Conservative hold		Swing		

Cokeham
Party	Candidate	Votes	%	±%
Conservative	Norman Wright	563	55.2	+7.9
Labour	Barry Mear	257	25.2	−4.2
Liberal Democrats	Nilda Dooraree	200	19.6	−3.7
Majority		306	30.0	+12.1
Turnout		1,020	31	
Conservative hold		Swing		

Eastbrook
Party	Candidate	Votes	%	±%
Conservative	Emma Evans	481	50.5	
Labour	Sally Campbell	193	20.3	
Liberal Democrats	John Hilditch	176	18.5	
UKIP	Jenny Greig	102	10.7	
Majority		288	30.2	
Turnout		952	29	
Conservative hold		Swing		

Hillside
Party	Candidate	Votes	%	±%
Conservative	Angus Dunn	611	58.5	−0.8
Labour	Barry Thompson	165	15.8	−3.2
UKIP	Rupert Greig	149	14.3	+14.3
Liberal Democrats	Carolyn White	119	11.4	−10.3
Majority		446	42.7	+5.1
Turnout		1,044	31	
Conservative hold		Swing		

Manor
Party	Candidate	Votes	%	±%
Conservative	Keith Dollemore	725	68.5	+8.9
Liberal Democrats	Stuart Douch	223	21.1	−19.3
Labour	Jean Turner	111	10.5	+10.5
Majority		502	47.4	+28.2
Turnout		1,059	33	
Conservative hold		Swing		

Marine (2)
Party	Candidate	Votes	%	±%
Shoreham Beach Residents Association	Liza McKinney	852		
Shoreham Beach Residents Association	Ben Stride	822		
Green	Stephen Barnes	183		
Labour	Agnes Daniel	150		
Liberal Democrats	Raj Dooraree	76		
Turnout		2,083	34	
Shoreham Beach Residents Association hold		Swing		
Shorehma Beach Residents Association hold		Swing		

Mash Barn
Party	Candidate	Votes	%	±%
Conservative	Brenda Collard	485	52.9	+9.0
Liberal Democrats	Moira Collins	259	28.3	−16.2
UKIP	Joyce Horne	88	9.6	+9.6
Labour	John Wales	84	9.2	+9.2
Majority		226	24.6	
Turnout		916	28	
Conservative hold		Swing		

Peverel
Party	Candidate	Votes	%	±%
Conservative	Carson Albury	597	59.6	+3.3
Liberal Democrats	Pauline Francis	192	19.2	−9.2
Labour	Kenneth Bashford	135	13.5	−1.8
UKIP	Ron Horne	78	7.8	+7.8
Majority		405	40.4	+12.5
Turnout		1,002	29	
Conservative hold		Swing		

St. Mary's
Party	Candidate	Votes	%	±%
Conservative	Rod Hotton	514	49.7	+2.5
Green	Susan Board	212	20.5	+0.3
Labour	Nigel Sweet	136	13.2	−2.7
Liberal Democrats	Jane Cottrell	99	9.6	−7.1
UKIP	Michael Henn	73	7.1	+7.1
Majority		302	29.2	+2.2
Turnout		1,034	32	
Conservative hold		Swing		

St. Nicolas
Party	Candidate	Votes	%	±%
Conservative	Brian Coomber	697	62.4	+4.7
Green	Martin Moyra	160	14.3	−3.3
Liberal Democrats	Timothy Clarke	135	12.1	−2.0
Labour	Simon Crisp	125	11.2	+0.7
Majority		537	48.1	+8.0
Turnout		1,117	35.4	
Conservative hold		Swing		

Southlands
Party	Candidate	Votes	%	±%
Conservative	Laura Graysmark	522	56.5	+7.0
Labour	Ricky Daniel	205	22.2	−11.1
Liberal Democrats	Tracey Clarke	110	11.9	−5.3
Green	Celia Behan	87	9.4	+9.4
Majority		317	34.3	+18.1
Turnout		924	31	
Conservative hold		Swing		

Southwick Green
Party	Candidate	Votes	%	±%
Conservative	Peter Metcalfe	668	56.0	−7.0
Liberal Democrats	David Edey	169	14.2	−9.2
Labour	Steve Carden	149	12.5	−1.1
Green	Alan Mair	106	8.9	+8.9
UKIP	Brian Elliott	101	8.5	+8.5
Majority		499	41.8	+2.2
Turnout		1,193	34	
Conservative hold		Swing		

Widewater (3)
Party	Candidate	Votes	%	±%
Conservative	Ann Bridges	870		
Conservative	Fred Lewis	826		
Conservative	Tony Nicklen	796		
Liberal Democrats	Doris Martin	638		
Liberal Democrats	Reginald Dolding	617		
Liberal Democrats	Cyril Cannings	593		
Labour	David Devoy	265		
Turnout		4,605	37	
Conservative hold		Swing		
Conservative hold		Swing		
Conservative hold		Swing		
