= 2008 Newcastle City Council election =

2008 UK local government election

- 1 May 2008

28 of the 78 seats on Newcastle City Council (including 2 by-elections) 40 seats needed for a majority
- Turnout: 38.1% (▼0.8)
	Majority party	Minority party
Party	Liberal Democrats	Labour
Seats before	47	31
Seats won	19	9
Seats after	49	29
Seat change	▲2	▼2
Popular vote	35,831	23,581
Percentage	46.8%	30.8%
Swing	▲0.7	▼4.4

Results of the 2008 Newcastle City Council election

Elections were held for one-third of the 78 seats on the Newcastle City Council on 1 May 2008. The ruling Liberal Democrats slightly increased their majority, and the table below shows the composition of the Council Chamber following these results.

Party	Seats			Council Composition 1 May 2008
Party	2006	2007	2008	Council Composition 1 May 2008
Liberal Democrats	?	46	49	
Labour	?	31	29	

== Results summary ==
2008 Newcastle City Council election
Party	This election			Full council			This election		
Party	Seats	Net	Seats %	Other	Total	Total %	Votes	Votes %	+/−
Liberal Democrats	19	▲2	67.9	30	49	62.8	35,831	46.8	▲0.7
Labour	9	▼2	32.1	20	29	37.2	23,581	30.8	▼4.4
Conservative	0	Steady	0.0	0	0	0.0	10,627	13.9	▲2.5
BNP	0	Steady	0.0	0	0	0.0	4,035	5.3	▲1.3
Green	0	Steady	0.0	0	0	0.0	1,206	1.6	▼1.3
Independent	0	Steady	0.0	0	0	0.0	685	0.9	▲0.6
Free England	0	New	0.0	0	0	0.0	367	0.5	New
UKIP	0	New	0.0	0	0	0.0	135	0.2	New
Communist	0	Steady	0.0	0	0	0.0	31	0.0	Steady
Left List	0	New	0.0	0	0	0.0	27	0.0	New

== Ward results ==
=== Benwell and Scotswood ===
Benwell and Scotswood
Party	Candidate	Votes	%	±%
Labour	Robert Higgins	1,441	48.1	−6.3
Liberal Democrats	Kelvin Gardiner	612	20.4	+5.1
BNP	Glen Watson	429	14.3	+3.8
Conservative	Neil Archibald	366	12.2	−2.6
Green	Laurence Ellacot	145	4.8	−0.1
Registered electors		8,307		
Turnout			36.1	−0.1
Labour hold		Swing		

=== Blakelaw ===
Blakelaw
Party	Candidate	Votes	%	±%
Liberal Democrats	Gerard Keating	1,396	49.6	−1.3
Labour	Antoine Tinnion	855	30.4	−3.3
Conservative	Margaret Johnson	295	10.5	+2.8
BNP	Michael Roche	270	9.6	+1.9
Registered electors		7,754		
Turnout			36.5	−2.1
Liberal Democrats hold		Swing		

=== Byker ===
Byker
Party	Candidate	Votes	%	±%
Labour	George Allison	1,258	56.5	−4.0
Liberal Democrats	Annie Gravell	377	16.9	−3.0
BNP	Steve Shears	285	12.8	+1.8
Conservative	Alice Gingell	208	9.3	+0.6
Independent	Allen Divall	97	4.4	N/A
Registered electors		7,064		
Turnout			31.6	−0.3
Labour hold		Swing		

=== Castle ===
Castle
Party	Candidate	Votes	%	±%
Liberal Democrats	Ian Graham	1,869	59.9	+0.5
Conservative	Jennifer Du Cane	771	24.7	+3.2
Labour	Ash Nehmet	481	15.4	−3.7
Registered electors		7,322		
Turnout			42.7	+0.6
Liberal Democrats hold		Swing		

=== Dene ===
Dene
Party	Candidate	Votes	%	±%
Liberal Democrats	Wendy Taylor	1,908	62.6	+0.2
Conservative	Heather Chambers	613	20.1	+1.5
Labour	Yvonne Bell	525	17.2	−1.8
Registered electors		7,130		
Turnout			42.8	+1.1
Liberal Democrats hold		Swing		

=== Denton ===
Denton
Party	Candidate	Votes	%	±%
Liberal Democrats	Peter Arnold	1,707	49.7	+3.4
Labour	Helen McStravick	882	25.7	−6.5
Conservative	Jon Aydon	374	10.9	−1.5
BNP	Bill Curry	337	9.8	+0.8
UKIP	Ian Proud	135	3.9	N/A
Registered electors		7,756		
Turnout			44.4	+1.5
Liberal Democrats hold		Swing		

=== East Gosforth ===
East Gosforth
Party	Candidate	Votes	%	±%
Liberal Democrats	Peter Leggott	1,892	62.6	+11.7
Conservative	Alan Birkmyre	630	20.8	−0.3
Labour	Bialu Ngituka	502	16.6	−1.5
Registered electors		6,870		
Turnout			44.3	−2.0
Liberal Democrats hold		Swing		

=== Elswick ===
Elswick
Party	Candidate	Votes	%	±%
Labour	Doreen James	933	38.2	−17.7
BNP	Kenneth Booth	657	26.9	+13.4
Independent	Amjad Aslam	339	13.9	N/A
Liberal Democrats	Andrew McQuillin	309	12.6	−3.9
Conservative	Ron Toward	179	7.3	−0.8
Left List	Dean Huggins	27	1.1	−4.9
Registered electors		7,345		
Turnout			33.4	+1.4
Labour hold		Swing		

=== Fawdon ===
Fawdon
Party	Candidate	Votes	%	±%
Liberal Democrats	Brenda Hindmarsh	1,770	60.0	−5.6
Labour	Catherine McKinnell	620	21.0	−5.5
Free England	Martin Thomson	367	12.4	N/A
Conservative	Stephen Warrick	194	6.6	−1.2
Registered electors		7,178		
Turnout			41.2	+0.1
Liberal Democrats hold		Swing		

=== Fenham ===
Fenham
Party	Candidate	Votes	%	±%
Liberal Democrats	Colin Dalglish	1,491	45.7	+4.2
Labour	George Johnson	1,188	36.4	−5.3
BNP	Shaun Russell	295	9.0	+1.4
Conservative	Denis Flaherty	290	8.9	−0.3
Registered electors		7,761		
Turnout			42.1	−0.8
Liberal Democrats gain from Labour		Swing		

=== Kenton ===
Kenton
Party	Candidate	Votes	%	±%
Labour	Margaret Carter	1,371	52.9	−2.9
Liberal Democrats	David Turner	752	29.0	+1.0
Conservative	Barney Baber	471	18.2	+2.0
Registered electors		7,540		
Turnout			34.6	−2.5
Labour hold		Swing		

=== Lemington ===
Lemington
Party	Candidate	Votes	%	±%
Liberal Democrats	Liz Langfield	1,280	42.9	−11.7
Labour	Barry Phillipson	1,131	37.9	+7.9
BNP	Graham Hodgson	325	10.9	+0.7
Conservative	Sarah Armstrong	248	8.3	+3.1
Registered electors		7,435		
Turnout			40.2	−0.4
Liberal Democrats gain from Labour		Swing		

=== Newburn ===
Newburn
Party	Candidate	Votes	%	±%
Liberal Democrats	Mike Curthoys	1,353	43.0	+0.1
Labour	Anne Whittaker	1,223	38.9	−3.1
BNP	Sheila Gregory	333	10.6	+0.3
Conservative	Maureen Smith	236	7.5	+2.7
Registered electors		7,030		
Turnout			44.8	−1.6
Liberal Democrats gain from Labour		Swing		

=== North Heaton ===
North Heaton
Party	Candidate	Votes	%	±%
Liberal Democrats	Doreen Huddart	1,693	55.3	−0.4
Labour	David Denholm	688	22.5	+0.1
Conservative	James Langley	398	13.0	+0.6
Green	Chris Hayday	281	9.2	−0.2
Registered electors		7,558		
Turnout			40.6	−1.3
Liberal Democrats hold		Swing		

=== North Jesmond ===
North Jesmond (2 seats due to by-election) Replacing Anthony Rounthwaite (Liberal Democrats)
Party	Candidate	Votes	%	±%
Liberal Democrats	Peter Breakey	1,013	54.2	−2.0
Liberal Democrats	Catherine Pagan	944	/	/
Labour	Fiona Clarke	486	26.0	+9.3
Labour	Sophie White	397	/	/
Conservative	Ben Fletcher	371	19.8	+3.4
Conservative	Rosie Fletcher	340	/	/
Registered electors		6,565		
Turnout			28.4	−2.9
Liberal Democrats hold		Swing		
Liberal Democrats hold		Swing		

=== Ouseburn ===
Ouseburn
Party	Candidate	Votes	%	±%
Liberal Democrats	Stephen Psallidas	814	51.1	−0.6
Labour	Patrick Clarke	451	28.3	Steady
Green	Dave Shepherdson	181	11.4	−1.9
Conservative	Emma Carr	146	9.2	+2.5
Registered electors		6,758		
Turnout			23.6	−4.0
Liberal Democrats hold		Swing		

=== Parklands ===
Parklands (2 seats due to by-election) Replacing David Brook (Liberal Democrats)
Party	Candidate	Votes	%	±%
Liberal Democrats	John Shipley	2,255	62.5	+1.7
Liberal Democrats	David Down	1,984	/	/
Conservative	Mark Laing	693	19.2	−1.1
Conservative	Pam Doyle	621	/	/
Labour	Susan Pearson	409	11.3	−1.1
Labour	Gordon Macfarlane	329	/	/
Independent	Andrea Bell	249	6.9	+0.5
Registered electors		7,278		
Turnout			47.0	−1.6
Liberal Democrats hold		Swing		
Liberal Democrats hold		Swing		

=== South Heaton ===
South Heaton
Party	Candidate	Votes	%	±%
Labour	Christopher Bartlett	948	46.1	+2.7
Liberal Democrats	Henry Gallager	813	39.5	−0.1
Green	Andrew Gray	190	9.2	−2.3
Conservative	Kenneth Wake	107	5.2	−0.3
Registered electors		5,873		
Turnout			35.1	−2.8
Labour hold		Swing		

=== South Jesmond ===
South Jesmond
Party	Candidate	Votes	%	±%
Liberal Democrats	Chris Boyle	946	54.7	+2.8
Conservative	Barry Flux	430	24.9	+4.9
Labour	Tom Hardwick	354	20.5	+2.9
Registered electors		6,151		
Turnout			28.3	−2.9
Liberal Democrats hold		Swing		

=== Walker ===
Walker
Party	Candidate	Votes	%	±%
Labour	David Wood	1,444	57.4	−8.1
Liberal Democrats	Michael Burn	496	19.7	+1.4
BNP	John Mitchell	274	10.9	+1.3
Conservative	Marian McWilliams	172	6.8	+1.3
Green	Anna Heyman	97	3.9	N/A
Communist	Martin Levy	31	1.2	+0.2
Registered electors		7,658		
Turnout			33.0	+0.4
Labour hold		Swing		

=== Walkergate ===
Walkergate
Party	Candidate	Votes	%	±%
Liberal Democrats	Peter Allen	1,596	55.5	−4.7
Labour	Maureen Lowson	809	28.1	−6.4
BNP	David Tullin	278	9.7	N/A
Conservative	Stephen Lowrey	195	6.8	+1.5
Registered electors		6,983		
Turnout			41.3	−0.3
Liberal Democrats hold		Swing		

=== West Gosforth ===
West Gosforth
Party	Candidate	Votes	%	±%
Liberal Democrats	Nick Cott	2,084	62.2	+2.9
Conservative	Neville Armstrong	840	25.1	+2.7
Labour	Howard Elcock	428	12.8	−0.2
Registered electors		7,216		
Turnout			46.7	−2.3
Liberal Democrats hold		Swing		

=== Westerhope ===
Westerhope
Party	Candidate	Votes	%	±%
Liberal Democrats	Marc Donnelly	2,085	53.5	−1.2
Labour	Brian Hunter	847	21.7	−3.0
Conservative	Jason Smith	652	16.7	+2.6
BNP	Daniel Thorlby	311	8.0	+1.6
Registered electors		7,603		
Turnout			51.3	+2.1
Liberal Democrats hold		Swing		

=== Westgate ===
Westgate
Party	Candidate	Votes	%	±%
Labour	Nick Forbes	938	64.7	+9.1
Liberal Democrats	James Kenyon	305	21.0	−4.4
Conservative	Charlotte Ball	206	14.2	+3.3
Registered electors		5,811		
Turnout			25.1	−0.4
Labour hold		Swing		

=== Wingrove ===
Wingrove
Party	Candidate	Votes	%	±%
Labour	Irim Ali	1,120	41.6	−1.5
Liberal Democrats	Jaz Siddique	962	35.7	−3.2
Green	John Pearson	312	11.6	+4.0
Conservative	Dominic Llewellyn	300	11.1	+4.0
Registered electors		7,768		
Turnout			34.8	+3.6
Labour gain from Liberal Democrats		Swing		

=== Woolsington ===
Woolsington
Party	Candidate	Votes	%	±%
Labour	Sharon Pattison	1,523	48.0	+1.0
Liberal Democrats	Bill Thorkildsen	1,125	35.5	−4.7
Conservative	Colin Forster	281	8.9	+2.2
BNP	Gary Fawcett	241	7.6	+1.4
Registered electors		7,652		
Turnout			41.5	−2.5
Labour hold		Swing		

== By-elections ==
=== Fenham ===
Fenham by-election 29 January 2009 Replacing Terry Cooney (Labour)
Party	Candidate	Votes	%	±%
Liberal Democrats	Mitzi Emery	1,049	33.9	−11.8
Labour	Helen McStravick	1,025	33.1	−3.3
BNP	Ken Booth	836	27.0	+18.0
Conservative	Sarah Armstrong	186	6.0	−2.9
Majority		24	0.8	
Turnout		3,096	39.6	−2.5
Liberal Democrats gain from Labour		Swing		
