= 2008 Oldham Metropolitan Borough Council election =

2008 UK local government election

Results of the 2008 Oldham Metropolitan Borough Council election

Elections to Oldham Council were held on 1 May 2008. One third of the council was up for election. The council remained in no overall control with the Liberal Democrats overtaking the Labour Party as the largest party.

After the election, the composition of the council was:

- Liberal Democrat 30
- Labour 22
- Conservative 7
- Independent 1

== Election result ==
Oldham local election result 2008
Party	Seats	Gains	Losses	Net gain/loss	Seats %	Votes %	Votes	+/−
Liberal Democrats	11	4	0	+4		37.6	22,558	+1.3
Labour	5	0	8	-8		31.5	18,866	-4.1
Conservative	4	4	0	+4		24.4	14,646	+3.3
Independent	0	0	0			2.1	1,282	+0.4
BNP	0	0	0			1.8	1,051	-1.1
Green	0	0	0			1.3	762	-1.1
England First	0	0	0			1.3	752	+1.3

== Ward results ==
=== Alexandra ward ===
Alexandra ward
Party	Candidate	Votes	%	±%
Liberal Democrats	Martin Dinoff	932	33.8	−3.4
Conservative	Khamran Ghafoor	841	30.5	+18.6
Labour	Hugh McDonald	801	29.1	−15.0
Independent	Phil Howarth	183	6.6	+6.6
Majority		91	3.3	
Turnout		2,757		
Liberal Democrats gain from Labour		Swing		

=== Chadderton Central ward ===
Chadderton Central ward
Party	Candidate	Votes	%	±%
Conservative	John Hudson	966	35.7	−15.5
Labour	Tony Brownridge	866	32.0	−9.9
BNP	Roy Goodwin	660	24.4	+24.4
Liberal Democrats	Pat Lord	212	7.8	+0.9
Majority		100	3.7	−5.6
Turnout		2,704		
Conservative gain from Labour		Swing		

=== Chadderton North ward ===
Chadderton North ward
Party	Candidate	Votes	%	±%
Conservative	Jack Hulme	1,699	55.8	+11.8
Labour	Julie Kirkham	927	30.4	−3.8
Liberal Democrats	Nilu Uddin	419	13.8	+2.8
Majority		772	25.3	+15.5
Turnout		3,045		
Conservative gain from Labour		Swing		

=== Chadderton South ward ===
Chadderton South ward
Party	Candidate	Votes	%	±%
Labour	Dave Hibbert	959	40.7	−3.7
Conservative	John Berry	735	31.2	+6.5
England First	Martin Brierley	425	18.0	+18.0
Liberal Democrats	Kevin Dawson	236	10.0	−1.1
Majority		224	9.5	−11.0
Turnout		2,355		
Labour hold		Swing		

=== Coldhurst ward ===
Coldhurst ward
Party	Candidate	Votes	%	±%
Labour	Abdul Jabbar	2,296	52.8	+19.3
Liberal Democrats	Mujibur Rahman	1,684	38.8	−4.4
Conservative	Muhammed Dara	365	8.4	−7.7
Majority		612	14.0	
Turnout		4,354		
Labour hold		Swing		

=== Crompton ward ===
Crompton ward
Party	Candidate	Votes	%	±%
Liberal Democrats	Ann Wingate	1,672	58.8	+3.2
Conservative	Chris Shyne	819	28.8	+7.1
Labour	David Bibby	351	12.4	−4.7
Majority		853	30.0	−3.8
Turnout		2,842		
Liberal Democrats hold		Swing		

=== Failsworth East ward ===
Failsworth East ward
Party	Candidate	Votes	%	±%
Conservative	Paul Martin	1,036	43.7	+11.4
Labour	Barbara Dawson	1,028	43.3	−14.6
Green	John Parker	173	7.3	+1.3
Liberal Democrats	Phil Renold	136	5.7	+1.9
Majority		8	0.4	
Turnout		2,373		
Conservative gain from Labour		Swing		

=== Failsworth West ward ===
Failsworth West ward
Party	Candidate	Votes	%	±%
Conservative	Ian Barker	963	37.7	+7.5
Labour	John Johnson	871	34.1	−2.1
Green	Warren Bates	589	23.1	−5.3
Liberal Democrats	Ken Wilson	132	5.2	+0.1
Majority		92	3.6	
Turnout		2,555		
Conservative gain from Labour		Swing		

=== Hollinwood ward ===
Hollinwood ward
Party	Candidate	Votes	%	±%
Liberal Democrats	Ken Wilson	1,268	51.4	+9.1
Labour	Jean Stretton	992	40.2	−0.4
Conservative	Abdul Malik	208	8.4	−4.4
Majority		276	11.2	+9.5
Turnout		2,468		
Liberal Democrats gain from Labour		Swing		

=== Medlock Vale ward ===
Medlock Vale ward
Party	Candidate	Votes	%	±%
Labour	Ur-Rahman Ateeque	1,136	39.9	−18.3
Liberal Democrats	Rafiq Pazeer	925	32.5	+13.0
Independent	Gary Dalloway	534	18.7	+18.7
Conservative	Tahir Iqbal	254	8.9	−13.3
Majority		211	7.4	−28.6
Turnout		2,849		
Labour hold		Swing		

=== Royton North ward ===
Royton North ward
Party	Candidate	Votes	%	±%
Labour	Bernard Judge	1,093	36.2	−4.1
Conservative	Joseph Farquhar	811	26.8	−3.4
Liberal Democrats	Nazia Raja	742	24.6	+15.6
Independent	Anita Corbett	376	12.4	+12.4
Majority		282	9.3	−0.8
Turnout		3,022		
Labour hold		Swing		

=== Royton South ward ===
Royton South ward
Party	Candidate	Votes	%	±%
Liberal Democrats	Diane Williamson	1,333	42.8	+9.5
Labour	Phil Harrison	953	30.6	−6.5
Conservative	Allan Fish	832	26.7	+6.2
Majority		380	12.8	
Turnout		3,118		
Liberal Democrats gain from Labour		Swing		

=== Saddleworth North ward ===
Saddleworth North ward
Party	Candidate	Votes	%	±%
Liberal Democrats	Mike Buckley	1,744	53.9	−1.8
Conservative	Barbara Jackson	916	28.3	+3.9
Labour	Ken Hulme	575	25.6	+7.8
Majority		828	31.3	+1.2
Turnout		3,235		
Liberal Democrats hold		Swing		

=== Saddleworth South ward ===
Saddleworth South ward
Party	Candidate	Votes	%	±%
Liberal Democrats	Richard Knowles	1,774	48.5	−6.6
Conservative	Graham Sheldon	1,582	43.2	+11.2
Labour	Paul Fryer	301	8.2	+1.2
Majority		192	5.2	−17.8
Turnout		3,657		
Liberal Democrats hold		Swing		

=== Saddleworth West and Lees ward ===
Saddleworth West and Lees ward
Party	Candidate	Votes	%	±%
Liberal Democrats	Val Sedgewick	1,673	55.8	+0.8
Conservative	Pam Byrne	799	26.6	+0.4
Labour	John Battye	527	17.6	−0.8
Majority		874	29.1	+0.2
Turnout		2,999		
Liberal Democrats hold		Swing		

=== St James ward ===
St James ward
Party	Candidate	Votes	%	±%
Liberal Democrats	Jackie Stanton	968	44.8	−7.7
Labour	Joseph Fitzpatrick	476	22.0	−8.0
Conservative	David Atherton	392	18.1	+18.1
England First	Andrew Clayton	327	15.1	+15.1
Majority		492	22.7	+4.0
Turnout		2,163		
Liberal Democrats hold		Swing		

=== St Marys ward ===
St Marys ward
Party	Candidate	Votes	%	±%
Liberal Democrats	Mohammed Masud	2,483	56.0	+8.2
Labour	Mohammed Sharif	1,632	36.8	−15.4
Conservative	Paul Stephenson	320	7.2	+7.2
Majority		851	19.2	
Turnout		4,434		
Liberal Democrats gain from Labour		Swing		

=== Shaw ward ===
Shaw ward
Party	Candidate	Votes	%	±%
Liberal Democrats	Howard Sykes	1,496	57.3	+1.4
Conservative	Michael Canning	422	16.2	+3.4
BNP	Alwyn Stott	391	15.0	+2.0
Labour	Dilys Fletcher	303	11.6	−1.7
Majority		1,074	41.1	−1.5
Turnout		2,612		
Liberal Democrats hold		Swing		

=== Waterhead ward ===
Waterhead ward
Party	Candidate	Votes	%	±%
Liberal Democrats	Linda Dawson	1,421	57.3	−4.7
Labour	Arooj Shah	535	21.6	−4.0
Conservative	David Caddick	335	13.5	+13.5
Independent	Stuart Allsopp	189	7.6	+0.4
Majority		886	35.7	−0.7
Turnout		2,480		
Liberal Democrats hold		Swing		

=== Werneth ward ===
Werneth ward
Party	Candidate	Votes	%	±%
Labour	Fida Hussain	2,244	57.5	+11.3
Liberal Democrats	Ashazar Mahmood	1,308	33.5	−5.0
Conservative	Mohammed Irfan	351	9.0	−6.4
Majority		936	24.0	+16.3
Turnout		3,903		
Labour hold		Swing		
