= 2008 Cheltenham Borough Council election =

2008 UK local government election

Results of the 2008 Cheltenham Borough Council election

The 2008 Cheltenham Council election took place on 1 May 2008 to elect members of Cheltenham Borough Council in Gloucestershire, England. Half of the council was up for election and the council stayed under no overall control.

After the election, the composition of the council was

- Liberal Democrat 20
- Conservative 17
- People Against Bureaucracy 3

== Campaign ==
Before the election the Conservatives and Liberal Democrats had 17 seats each, People Against Bureaucracy 5 and Labour 1 seat, with the Conservatives forming the administration. 20 seats were being contested with both Conservatives and Liberal Democrats contesting all of the seats, while Labour contested 9, Greens 4 and People Against Bureaucracy 3 seats. The only Labour councillor Diana Hale stood down at the election, along with 2 Conservative and 1 People Against Bureaucracy councillors, while Liberal Democrat councillor Chris Coleman contested Leckhampton instead of his existing seat in St Paul's ward.

During the campaign the national Conservative leader David Cameron briefly visited Cheltenham to campaign, raising the issues of post offices being closed, garden grabbing, preserving local shops and house building on flood plains.

== Election result ==
The results saw the Liberal Democrats become the largest party on the council with 20 of the 40 seats after making 3 gains. The Liberal Democrats held vulnerable seats in All Saints and St Peters wards, while making gains from each of the other 3 groups which had been defending seats. They also almost defeated the Conservative leader of the council Duncan Smith who held on by 33 votes in Charlton Kings ward.

The Conservatives stayed on 17 seats, while the People Against Bureaucracy group lost 2 seats to have 3 councillors. Labour was wiped out after losing their last seat in Oakley, with the party only coming in third place in the ward. Overall turnout in the election was 35.1%.

As a result of the election the Liberal Democrats took over control of the administration of the council from the Conservatives. The change in control came in a vote with the Liberal Democrat leader Steve Jordan receiving 18 votes, compared to 19 abstentions and the remaining 3 councillors being absent.

Cheltenham local election result 2008
Party	Seats	Gains	Losses	Net gain/loss	Seats %	Votes %	Votes	+/−
Liberal Democrats	10	3	0	+3	50.0	44.9	14,059	+4.1%
Conservative	9	1	1	0	45.0	45.8	14,342	-0.1%
PAB	1	0	2	-2	5.0	5.7	1,783	-2.6%
Labour	0	0	1	-1	0	2.9	923	-1.5%
Green	0	0	0	0	0	0.7	209	+0.7%

== Ward results ==
All Saints
Party	Candidate	Votes	%	±%
Liberal Democrats	Stephen Jordan*	811	59.1	+8.0
Conservative	Peter Christensen	461	33.6	−3.9
Green	Adrian Becker	61	4.4	N/A
Labour	Kevin Boyle	40	2.9	−2.9
Majority		350	25.5	+11.9
Turnout		1,373	31.9	+1.8
Liberal Democrats hold		Swing		

Battledown
Party	Candidate	Votes	%	±%
Conservative	Andrew Wall*	1,013	66.7	−1.6
Liberal Democrats	Paul McCloskey	442	29.1	+3.5
Labour	Catherine Mozley	64	4.2	−1.9
Majority		571	37.6	−5.1
Turnout		1,519	41.4	−1.4
Conservative hold		Swing		

Benhall and The Reddings
Party	Candidate	Votes	%	±%
Conservative	Jacqueline Fletcher*	945	50.7	+6.7
Liberal Democrats	Christoper Pallet	918	49.3	−3.5
Majority		27	1.4	−7.2
Turnout		1,863	46.1	+0.3
Conservative hold		Swing		

Charlton Kings
Party	Candidate	Votes	%	±%
Conservative	Duncan Smith*	973	49.0	−9.8
Liberal Democrats	Helena McCloskey	940	47.4	+11.4
Labour	Neville Mozley	71	3.6	−1.6
Majority		33	1.7	−21.1
Turnout		1,984	46.0	+0.7
Conservative hold		Swing		

Charlton Park
Party	Candidate	Votes	%	±%
Conservative	Klara Sudbury	1,285	67.9	+3.8
Liberal Democrats	Margaret Woodward	607	32.1	−3.8
Majority		678	35.8	+7.7
Turnout		1,892	47.0	−1.6
Conservative hold		Swing		

College
Party	Candidate	Votes	%	±%
Liberal Democrats	Lloyd Surgenor*	997	59.0	+3.2
Conservative	Timothy Mahon	692	41.0	−3.2
Majority		305	18.1	+6.4
Turnout		1,689	39.5	+2.1
Liberal Democrats hold		Swing		

Hesters Way
Party	Candidate	Votes	%	±%
Liberal Democrats	Wendy Flynn*	779	65.1	−1.3
Conservative	Philip Woolley	351	29.3	+3.3
Labour	Clive Harriss	67	5.6	−2.0
Majority		428	35.8	−4.6
Turnout		1,197	24.3	−4.0
Liberal Democrats hold		Swing		

Lansdown
Party	Candidate	Votes	%	±%
Conservative	Diggory Seacome*	759	59.3	−8.9
Liberal Democrats	Leone Meyer	428	33.5	+1.7
Labour	Janet Thomas	92	7.2	N/A
Majority		331	25.9	−10.5
Turnout		1,279	28.2	−1.5
Conservative hold		Swing		

Leckhampton
Party	Candidate	Votes	%	±%
Conservative	Robin MacDonald*	1,210	56.0	−4.5
Liberal Democrats	Christopher Coleman**	950	44.0	+4.5
Majority		260	12.0	−8.9
Turnout		2,160	52.9	+1.5
Conservative hold		Swing		

Christopher Coleman was a sitting councillor in St Paul's.

Oakley
Party	Candidate	Votes	%	±%
Liberal Democrats	Martin Dunn	661	51.3	+5.8
Conservative	Susie Godwin	403	31.3	+13.2
Labour	Brian Hughes	224	17.4	−19.0
Majority		258	20.0	+10.9
Turnout		1,288	30.1	−2.2
Liberal Democrats gain from Labour		Swing		

Park
Party	Candidate	Votes	%	±%
Conservative	Heather McLain	1,273	67.7	+1.5
Liberal Democrats	Phillippa Stewart	607	32.3	−1.5
Majority		666	35.4	+3.0
Turnout		1,880	36.8	−3.7
Conservative hold		Swing		

Pittville
Party	Candidate	Votes	%	±%
Conservative	Tim Cooper	625	38.7	+13.7
Liberal Democrats	Rowena Hay	541	33.5	+8.0
PAB	Mary Nelson	318	19.7	−26.1
Green	Cathy Green	65	4.0	N/A
Labour	Sandra Easton-Lawrence	64	4.0	+0.2
Majority		84	5.2	−15.1
Turnout		1,613	37.7	−1.2
Conservative gain from PAB		Swing		

Prestbury
Party	Candidate	Votes	%	±%
PAB	Malcolm Stennett*	1,098	55.1	+0.3
Conservative	Haydn Pearl	539	27.0	−6.5
Liberal Democrats	Jennifer Jones	253	12.7	+1.0
Labour	Jonquil Naish	104	5.2	N/A
Majority		559	28.0	+6.7
Turnout		1,994	41.7	−0.5
PAB hold		Swing		

Springbank
Party	Candidate	Votes	%	±%
Liberal Democrats	Simon Wheeler*	752	67.3	+5.4
Conservative	Simon Probert	366	32.7	−5.4
Majority		386	34.5	+10.6
Turnout		1,118	23.1	−1.0
Liberal Democrats hold		Swing		

St Marks
Party	Candidate	Votes	%	±%
Liberal Democrats	John Webster*	622	50.3	−3.9
Conservative	Patsy Shilling	423	34.2	−1.4
Labour	Rod Gay	108	8.7	−1.6
Green	John Heyward	83	6.7	N/A
Majority		199	16.1	−2.5
Turnout		1,236	26.4	−1.8
Liberal Democrats hold		Swing		

St Pauls
Party	Candidate	Votes	%	±%
Liberal Democrats	Paul Wheeldon	493	65.7	+14.5
Conservative	Paul Ryder	257	34.3	+15.6
Majority		236	31.5	−1.0
Turnout		750	16.0	−3.5
Liberal Democrats hold		Swing		

St Peters
Party	Candidate	Votes	%	±%
Liberal Democrats	John Rawson*	738	57.9	+11.7
Conservative	John Hopwood	447	35.1	−10.0
Labour	Robert Irons	89	7.0	−1.8
Majority		291	22.8	+21.7
Turnout		1,274	26.0	+0.6
Liberal Democrats hold		Swing		

Swindon Village
Party	Candidate	Votes	%	±%
Liberal Democrats	Bernard Fisher	875	57.4	+9.7
PAB	Peter Allen*	367	24.1	−11.0
Conservative	Leon Mekitarian	282	18.5	+1.3
Majority		508	33.3	+20.7
Turnout		1,524	33.4	+1.3
Liberal Democrats gain from PAB		Swing		

Up Hatherley
Party	Candidate	Votes	%	±%
Liberal Democrats	Roger Whyborn	1,115	58.4	+19.7
Conservative	Alan Nicholson*	793	41.6	−3.1
Majority		322	16.9	+10.9
Turnout		1,908	45.0	−1.6
Liberal Democrats gain from Conservative		Swing		

Warden Hill
Party	Candidate	Votes	%	±%
Conservative	Anne Regan*	1,245	70.1	+6.8
Liberal Democrats	Frances McVeigh	530	29.9	−6.8
Majority		715	40.3	+12.6
Turnout		1,775	39.7	−3.0
Conservative hold		Swing		
