= 2008 Redditch Borough Council election =

2008 UK local government election

Map of the results

2008 Elections to Redditch Borough Council were held on 1 May 2008. One third of the council was up for election and the Conservative Party gained overall control of the council from no overall control. Overall turnout was 33.2%.

This was the first time in 26 years that the Conservative Party had control of Redditch council. This came after the Conservatives gained 4 seats from the Labour Party, with local and national issues being said to be behind the results. The results in Redditch were described as being representative of the mood of the electorate nationally.

After the election, the composition of the council was:

- Conservative 15
- Labour 10
- Liberal Democrat 3
- British National Party 1

This was the first time in 26 years that the Conservative Party had control of Redditch council. This came after the Conservatives gained 4 seats from the Labour Party, with local and national issues being said to be behind the results. The results in Redditch were described as being representative of the mood of the electorate nationally.

After the election, the composition of the council was:

- Conservative 15
- Labour 10
- Liberal Democrat 3
- British National Party 1

== Election result ==
Redditch local election result 2008
Party	Seats	Gains	Losses	Net gain/loss	Seats %	Votes %	Votes	+/−
Conservative	6	4	0	+4	66.7	48.0	7,815	+6.1
Labour	2	0	4	-4	22.2	30.0	4,881	+0.7
Liberal Democrats	1	0	0	0	11.1	13.9	2,263	-6.8
Independent	0	0	0	0	0.0	4.7	768	+4.2
BNP	0	0	0	0	0.0	3.4	549	-4.3

== Ward results ==
Batchley
Party	Candidate	Votes	%	±%
Conservative	Jinny Pearce	968	51.4	+21.1
Labour	Diane Haywood	709	37.7	−2.0
Liberal Democrats	Christopher Hennessey	205	10.9	+2.6
Majority		259	13.7	
Turnout		1,882	32.3	−3.8
Conservative gain from Labour		Swing		

Central
Party	Candidate	Votes	%	±%
Conservative	R Farooqui	744	47.1	+11.1
Labour	Greg Chance	571	36.1	−13.3
Liberal Democrats	Simone Rudge	153	9.7	−5.0
Independent	Isabel Armstrong	113	7.1	+7.1
Majority		173	11.0	
Turnout		1,581	34.5	−5.0
Conservative gain from Labour		Swing		

Church Hill
Party	Candidate	Votes	%	±%
Labour	Bill Hartnett	733	39.3	−4.3
Conservative	James Swansborough	722	38.7	+2.2
Liberal Democrats	David Gee	233	12.5	−7.4
Independent	Dave Small	176	9.4	+9.4
Majority		11	0.6	−6.5
Turnout		1,864	30.3	−0.6
Labour hold		Swing		

Greenlands
Party	Candidate	Votes	%	±%
Conservative	William Norton	702	41.1	+17.1
Labour	Patie Hill	626	36.6	−0.8
Liberal Democrats	Anthony Pitt	263	15.4	+1.4
Independent	Orion Moon	119	7.0	+7.0
Majority		76	4.5	
Turnout		1,710	27.7	−5.4
Conservative gain from Labour		Swing		

Headless Cross & Oakenshaw
Party	Candidate	Votes	%	±%
Conservative	Peter Anderson	1,493	62.9	+5.1
Labour	Dot Dudley	550	23.2	−3.1
Liberal Democrats	Ronald Thompson	330	13.9	−1.9
Majority		943	39.7	+8.2
Turnout		2,373	34.7	−2.7
Conservative hold		Swing		

Lodge Park
Party	Candidate	Votes	%	±%
Labour	Mark Shummer	556	41.4	−4.9
Conservative	Paul Swansborough	547	40.7	+5.2
Liberal Democrats	Ian Webster	147	10.9	−7.4
Independent	Richard Armstrong	94	7.0	+7.0
Majority		9	0.7	−10.1
Turnout		1,344	33.4	−0.7
Labour hold		Swing		

Matchborough
Party	Candidate	Votes	%	±%
Conservative	Anita Clayton	852	58.5	+2.3
Labour	Gareth Young	356	24.4	−4.8
Liberal Democrats	Fiona Hennessey	141	9.7	−4.9
Independent	Rod Mansell	108	7.4	+7.4
Majority		496	34.1	+7.1
Turnout		1,457	32.0	−1.8
Conservative gain from Labour		Swing		

West
Party	Candidate	Votes	%	±%
Conservative	Michael Braley	1,112	71.1	+6.4
Labour	John Fisher	294	18.8	−4.0
Independent	Helen Truman	158	10.1	+10.1
Majority		818	52.3	+10.4
Turnout		1,564	35.4	−2.5
Conservative hold		Swing		

Winyates
Party	Candidate	Votes	%	±%
Liberal Democrats	Malcolm Hall	791	31.6	+1.5
Conservative	John Russell	675	27.0	+9.4
BNP	Maurice Field	549	22.0	+0.4
Labour	Linda Hammond	486	19.4	−9.0
Majority		116	4.6	+2.9
Turnout		2,501	38.7	−4.1
Liberal Democrats hold		Swing		
