= 2008 Bury Metropolitan Borough Council election =

2008 UK local government election

Results of the 2008 Bury Metropolitan Borough Council election

Elections to Bury Council were held on 1 May 2008. One third of the council was up for election. The Conservative Party gained overall control of the council, from previous No Overall Control of any party.

After the election, the composition of the council was:

- Conservative 26
- Labour 16
- Liberal Democrat 9

== Election result ==
Bury local election result 2008
| Party | Seats | Gains | Losses | Net gain/loss | Seats % | Votes % | Votes | +/− |
|---|---|---|---|---|---|---|---|---|
| Conservative | 10 | 3 | 0 | +3 | 58.8 | 45.0 | 25,447 | +3.6 |
| Labour | 4 | 0 | 4 | -4 | 23.5 | 25.6 | 14,469 | -8.3 |
| Liberal Democrats | 3 | 1 | 0 | +1 | 17.6 | 17.9 | 10,121 | -0.5 |
| BNP | 0 | 0 | 0 | 0 | 0 | 8.8 | 4,958 | +2.9 |
| English Democrat | 0 | 0 | 0 | 0 | 0 | 0.2 | 354 | +0.2 |
| UKIP | 0 | 0 | 0 | 0 | 0 | 0.2 | 89 | +0.2 |
| Independent | 0 | 0 | 0 | 0 | 0 | 2.4 | 1,352 | +2.1 |

== Ward results ==
=== Besses ward ===
Besses ward
| Party | Candidate | Votes | % | ±% |
|---|---|---|---|---|
| Labour | Derek Boden | 1084 | 41.1 | −6.4 |
| Liberal Democrats | Julie Baum | 614 | 23.3 | +5.3 |
| Conservative | Adele Douglas | 584 | 22.2 | −12.4 |
| English Democrat | Stephen Morris | 354 | 13.4 | +13.4 |
| Majority | | 470 | 17.8 | +4.9 |
| Turnout | | 2,636 | | |
| Labour hold | | Swing | | |

=== Church ward ===
Church ward
| Party | Candidate | Votes | % | ±% |
|---|---|---|---|---|
| Conservative | Roy Walker | 2425 | 63.9 | +8.6 |
| Labour | Linda Chesters | 789 | 20.8 | −3.6 |
| BNP | Julia Kay | 292 | 7.7 | −2.1 |
| Liberal Democrats | Tamsin Thomson | 287 | 7.6 | −2.9 |
| Majority | | 1636 | 43.1 | +12.2 |
| Turnout | | 3,793 | | |
| Conservative hold | | Swing | | |

=== East ward ===
East ward
| Party | Candidate | Votes | % | ±% |
|---|---|---|---|---|
| Labour | John Byrne | 1148 | 44.9 | −4.8 |
| Conservative | Azmat Hussain | 1023 | 40.0 | +9.2 |
| Liberal Democrats | Emma Davison | 384 | 15.0 | +2.9 |
| Majority | | 125 | 4.9 | −14.0 |
| Turnout | | 2,555 | | |
| Labour hold | | Swing | | |

=== Elton ward ===
Elton ward
| Party | Candidate | Votes | % | ±% |
|---|---|---|---|---|
| Conservative | Yvonne Creswell | 1861 | 61.2 | +8.9 |
| Labour | Simon Carter | 775 | 25.5 | −6.0 |
| Liberal Democrats | Robert Sloss | 405 | 13.3 | −3.0 |
| Majority | | 1086 | 35.7 | +14.9 |
| Turnout | | 3,041 | | |
| Conservative hold | | Swing | | |

=== Holyrood ward ===
Holyrood ward
| Party | Candidate | Votes | % | ±% |
|---|---|---|---|---|
| Liberal Democrats | Vic DAlbert | 1632 | 51.8 | −2.8 |
| Conservative | Matthew Hague | 852 | 27.0 | +4.6 |
| Labour | Benjamin Shatliff | 669 | 21.2 | −1.8 |
| Majority | | 780 | 24.7 | −7.0 |
| Turnout | | 3,153 | | |
| Liberal Democrats hold | | Swing | | |

=== Moorside ward ===
Moorside ward
| Party | Candidate | Votes | % | ±% |
|---|---|---|---|---|
| Labour | Dot Cassidy | 1279 | 40.7 | +1.6 |
| Conservative | Angela Cane | 1197 | 38.0 | +3.8 |
| BNP | Phil Sedman | 317 | 10.1 | −0.6 |
| Liberal Democrats | Nissa Finney | 223 | 7.1 | −8.9 |
| Independent | Victor Hagan | 130 | 4.1 | +4.1 |
| Majority | | 82 | 2.6 | −2.3 |
| Turnout | | 3,146 | | |
| Labour hold | | Swing | | |

=== North Manor ward ===
North Manor ward
| Party | Candidate | Votes | % | ±% |
|---|---|---|---|---|
| Conservative | Dorothy Gunther | 2694 | 70.2 | +7.5 |
| Labour | Nick Parnell | 577 | 15.0 | −4.6 |
| Liberal Democrats | Ewan Arthur | 338 | 8.8 | −4.1 |
| BNP | Tom Nuttall | 162 | 4.2 | −0.6 |
| Independent | Lynette Mitchell (Male) | 66 | 1.7 | +1.7 |
| Majority | | 2117 | 55.2 | +12.1 |
| Turnout | | 3,837 | | |
| Conservative hold | | Swing | | |

=== Pilkington Park ward ===
Pilkington Park ward
| Party | Candidate | Votes | % | ±% |
|---|---|---|---|---|
| Conservative | Michelle Wiseman | 1908 | 67.0 | +5.7 |
| Labour | Gill Campbell | 637 | 22.4 | −4.2 |
| Liberal Democrats | Wayne Burrows | 304 | 10.7 | −1.4 |
| Majority | | 1271 | 44.6 | +9.9 |
| Turnout | | 2,849 | | |
| Conservative hold | | Swing | | |

=== Radcliffe East ward ===
Radcliffe East ward
| Party | Candidate | Votes | % | ±% |
|---|---|---|---|---|
| Conservative | Sam Hurst | 1384 | 45.2 | +12.9 |
| Labour | Daisy Johnston | 907 | 29.6 | −6.2 |
| BNP | Tom Rosser | 466 | 15.2 | −4.3 |
| Liberal Democrats | Mike Halsall | 308 | 10.0 | −2.5 |
| Majority | | 477 | 15.6 | |
| Turnout | | 3,065 | | |
| Conservative gain from Labour | | Swing | | |

=== Radcliffe North ward ===
Radcliffe North ward
| Party | Candidate | Votes | % | ±% |
|---|---|---|---|---|
| Conservative | Jackie Harris | 1656 | 45.8 | +5.0 |
| Labour | Timothy Chamberlain | 1265 | 35.0 | −3.6 |
| BNP | Peter Hallows | 472 | 13.1 | −0.3 |
| Liberal Democrats | Lynn Molloy | 220 | 6.1 | −1.2 |
| Majority | | 391 | 10.8 | +8.6 |
| Turnout | | 3,613 | | |
| Conservative gain from Labour | | Swing | | |

=== Radcliffe West ward ===
Radcliffe West ward
| Party | Candidate | Votes | % | ±% |
|---|---|---|---|---|
| Labour | Tony Isherwood | 1187 | 44.6 | −5.7 |
| Conservative | Bernard Slingsby | 727 | 27.3 | +4.7 |
| BNP | Stewart Clough | 484 | 18.2 | −1.3 |
| Liberal Democrats | Joanne O'Hanlon | 175 | 6.6 | −1.0 |
| UKIP | Harold Greenhalgh | 89 | 3.3 | +3.3 |
| Majority | | 460 | 17.3 | −10.5 |
| Turnout | | 2,662 | | |
| Labour hold | | Swing | | |

=== Ramsbottom ward ===
Ramsbottom ward
| Party | Candidate | Votes | % | ±% |
|---|---|---|---|---|
| Conservative | Barry Theckston | 2010 | 62.1 | +6.4 |
| Labour | Val Robinson | 872 | 26.9 | −5.0 |
| Liberal Democrats | Janet Turner | 354 | 10.9 | −1.7 |
| Majority | | 1138 | 35.2 | +11.3 |
| Turnout | | 3,236 | | |
| Conservative hold | | Swing | | |

=== Redvales ward ===
Redvales ward
| Party | Candidate | Votes | % | ±% |
|---|---|---|---|---|
| Conservative | Ijaz Ahmed | 1465 | 43.4 | +9.4 |
| Labour | Susan Southworth | 1093 | 32.3 | −4.8 |
| BNP | Brian Jepson | 317 | 9.4 | −2.4 |
| Liberal Democrats | Paul Jenkins | 302 | 8.9 | −8.3 |
| Independent | Mike Harling | 104 | 3.1 | +3.1 |
| Independent | Bill Brison | 98 | 2.9 | +2.9 |
| Majority | | 372 | 11.0 | |
| Turnout | | 3,379 | | |
| Conservative gain from Labour | | Swing | | |

=== Sedgley ward ===
Sedgley ward
| Party | Candidate | Votes | % | ±% |
|---|---|---|---|---|
| Liberal Democrats | Ann Garner | 1488 | 41.0 | +2.8 |
| Conservative | Jonathan Grosskopf | 1238 | 34.1 | +2.6 |
| Labour | Frank Adam | 906 | 24.9 | −5.7 |
| Majority | | 250 | 6.9 | −2.8 |
| Turnout | | 3,632 | | |
| Liberal Democrats hold | | Swing | | |

=== St Marys ward ===
St Marys ward
| Party | Candidate | Votes | % | ±% |
|---|---|---|---|---|
| Liberal Democrats | Mary DAlbert | 1308 | 43.4 | +0.4 |
| Labour | Kevin Lee | 1013 | 33.6 | +0.4 |
| Conservative | Raymond Soloman | 692 | 23.0 | −0.8 |
| Majority | | 295 | 9.8 | −0.1 |
| Turnout | | 3,013 | | |
| Liberal Democrats gain from Labour | | Swing | | |

=== Tottington ward ===
Tottington ward
| Party | Candidate | Votes | % | ±% |
|---|---|---|---|---|
| Conservative | Roger Brown | 1700 | 57.0 | +4.7 |
| Labour | Jane Lewis | 614 | 20.6 | −3.7 |
| Liberal Democrats | David Foss | 456 | 15.3 | +3.8 |
| BNP | Reg Norris | 210 | 7.0 | −4.5 |
| Majority | | 1086 | 36.4 | +8.3 |
| Turnout | | 2,980 | | |
| Conservative hold | | Swing | | |

=== Unsworth ward ===
Unsworth ward
| Party | Candidate | Votes | % | ±% |
|---|---|---|---|---|
| Conservative | Sam Cohen | 1821 | 56.3 | +9.8 |
| Labour | Ann Audin | 1165 | 36.0 | −10.6 |
| Liberal Democrats | Theo Tymczyna | 248 | 7.7 | +0.7 |
| Majority | | 656 | 20.3 | |
| Turnout | | 3,234 | | |
| Conservative hold | | Swing | | |
