= 2008 Green Party presidential primaries =

- February 5 – June 27, 2008

836 delegates to the Green National Convention 419 delegates votes needed to win
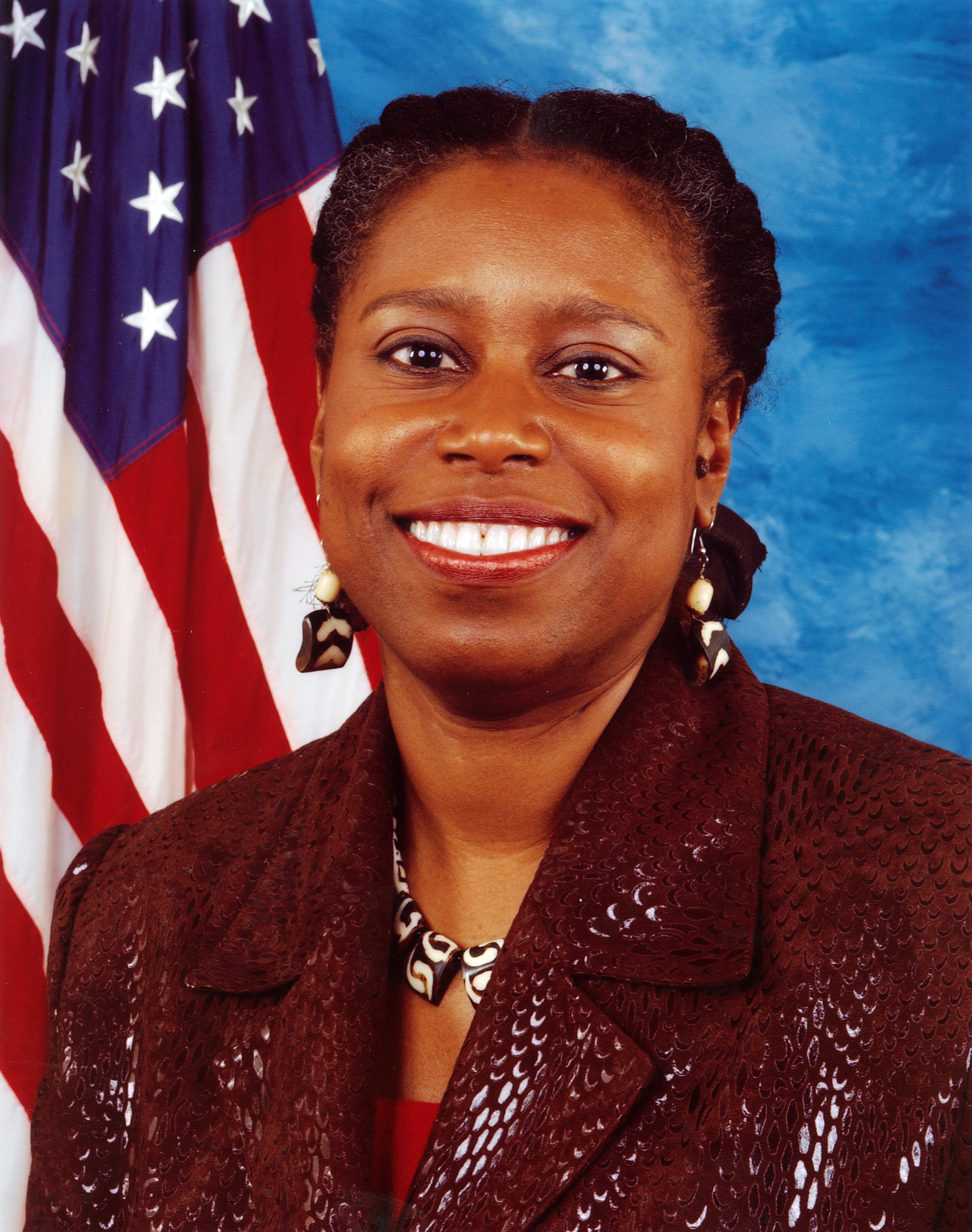

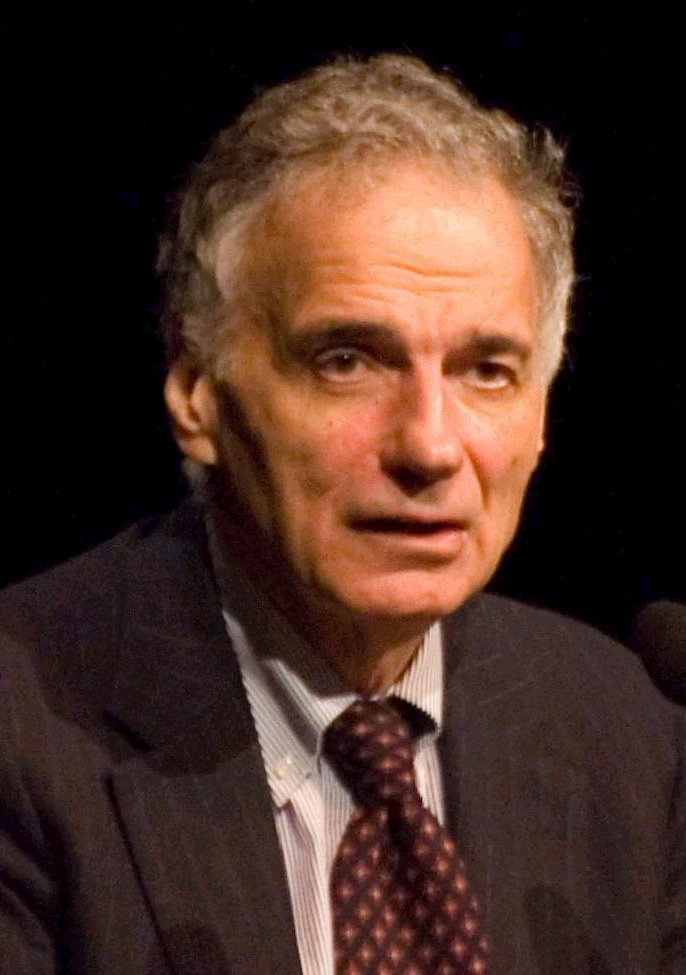

Candidate	Cynthia McKinney	Ralph Nader
Home state	Georgia	Washington D. C.
Delegate count	304½	139
Contests won	22	3
Candidate	Uncommitted	Jesse Johnson
Home state	N/A	West Virginia
Delegate count	50	27
Contests won	2	1
First place (popular vote or delegate count)
Cynthia McKinney (22)
Ralph Nader (3)
Jesse Johnson (1)
Uncommitted (2)
States/districts not holding contests
Previous Green nominee
David Cobb
Green nominee
Cynthia McKinney

The Green Party of the United States held primaries in several states in 2008. Cynthia McKinney won most of the primaries and was formally nominated as the party's nominee during the 2008 Green National Convention.

== Candidates ==
Candidate	Most recent position	Campaign	Delegates	Delegations with plurality
Cynthia McKinney of California	Member of the U.S. House of Representatives (1993–2003, 2005–2007)	(Campaign • Website)	304.5 / 836 (36.42%)	22 AZ, CT, DC, DE, FL, GA, IA, IL, IN, MD, ME, MI, MN, PA, NC, NE, NY, OR, RI, TN, WA, WI
Kent Mesplay of California	Inspector at the Air Pollution Control; District of San Diego County (2001–2015)	(Website)	29.5 / 836 (3.52%)	None
Jesse Johnson of West Virginia	2006 Senate candidate and 2004 gubernatorial candidate for the Mountain Party		27 / 836 (3.23%)	1 WV
Kat Swift of Texas	Activist, Bookkeeper	(Website)	24 / 836 (2.87%)	None
Jared Ball of Maryland	Professor and journalist		11 / 836 (1.32%)	None
Elaine Brown of California	Black Panther Party chairwoman 1974-1977		9 / 836 (1.08%)	None
Howie Hawkins of California	Activist		8 / 836 (0.96%)	None
Alternate ballot options
Ralph Nader of Connecticut	Independent Presidential Candidate (2004)	(Campaign • Website)	139 / 836 (16.6%)	3 MA, CA, VA
No preference/ Other/ Uncommitted	N/A		50 / 836 (5.90%)	1 AR

== Schedule ==
		Winning			Projected delegates									
Date	State	Candidate	Vote	Percent	Ball	Brown	Hawkins	Johnson	McKinney	Mesplay	Nader	Swift	Other	Total
February 1	Florida	Cynthia McKinney	-	-	-	-	-	-	11	1	2	1	-	16
February 5	Arkansas	Uncommitted	438	56%	1	0	0	0	2	1	0	0	4	8
February 5	California	Ralph Nader	21,726	61%	3	7	-	3	45	3	102	5	-	168
February 5	Illinois	Cynthia McKinney	1,513	57%	5	-	8	-	25	6	-	-	-	44
February 5	Massachusetts	Ralph Nader	744	40%	1	1	-	-	9	1	15	1	4	32
February 10	Maine	Cynthia McKinney	36	81.81%	1	-	-	4	16	1	-	1	-	-
February 12	D.C.	Cynthia McKinney	214	41%	1	-	-	-	7	-	1	1	6	16
March 1	Mississippi	-	-	-	-	-	-	-	-	-	-	-	-	8
March 1	North Carolina	Cynthia McKinney	-	-	-	-	-	2	5	1	-	-	-	8
March 4-April 4	Ohio	-	-	-	-	-	-	-	-	-	-	-	-	12
March 3	Minnesota (caucus)	Cynthia McKinney	187	60.91%	—N/a									
March 11	Virginia	Ralph Nader	-	-	-		-	1	2	-	3	1	1	8
March 25	Arizona	Cynthia McKinney	-	-	-	-	-	1	6	1	-	-	-	8
March 29	New Jersey	-	-	-	-	-	-	-	-	-	-	-	-	12
March 29	Wisconsin	Cynthia McKinney	77	79%	0	0	0	0	19	2	1	1	1	24
March 31	Washington	Cynthia McKinney	-	-	-		-	-	10	1	-	1	-	12
April 7	Rhode Island	Cynthia McKinney	27	75%	-	-	-	2	6	-	-	-	-	8
April 9	Indiana	Cynthia McKinney	-	-	-	-	7.5	0.5	-	-	-	-	-	8
April 13 - May 10	Pennsylvania	Cynthia McKinney	-	53%	-	-	-	3	17	1	4	1	6	32
May 10	Missouri	-	-	-	-	-	-	-	-	-	-	-	-	8
April 26	Connecticut	Cynthia McKinney	33	66%	0	0	0	1	13	1	2	-	3	20
April 27	West Virginia	Jesse Johnson	-	-	-	-	-	6	2	-	-	-	-	8
May 3	Colorado	Uncommitted	-	-	-	1	-	-	2	-	-	-	9	12
May 3	Georgia	Cynthia McKinney	-	-	-	-	-	-	7	-	-	1	-	8
May 3	Maryland	Cynthia McKinney	-	-	-	-	-	4	6	3	-	3	-	16
May 3	South Carolina	-	-	-	-	-	-	-	-	-	-	-	-	8
May 3	Tennessee	Cynthia McKinney	-	-	-	-	-	-	5	1	-	1	1	8
May 3	Utah	-	-	-	-	-	-	-	-	-	-	-	-	8
May 13	Nebraska	Cynthia McKinney	40	58%	-	-	-	-	-	-	-	-	-	8
May 17	Delaware	Cynthia McKinney	-	-	-	-	-	-	8	-	-	-	-	8
May 17	Iowa	Cynthia McKinney	-	-	-	-	1	3	1	-	-	-	3	8
May 31	Montana	-	-	-	-	-	-	-	-	-	-	-	-	8
May 31	New York (state)	Cynthia McKinney	-	-	-	-	-	-	23	3	3	-	2	24
June 7	New Mexico	-	-	-	-	-	-	-	-	-	-	-	-	8
June 7	Oregon	Cynthia McKinney	-	-	-	-	-	1	23	-	-	-	-	24
June 8	Minnesota (convention)	Cynthia McKinney	—N/a		-	-	-	-	11	-	-	-	1	12
June 8	New York City	Cynthia McKinney	-	-	-	-	-	2	9	1	-	-	-	12
June 14	Texas	-	-	-	-	-	-	-	-	-	-	-	-	12
	Vermont	-	-	-	-	-	-	-	-	-	-	-	-	8
June 26–27	Michigan	Cynthia McKinney	-	-	-	-	-	-	13	1	3	1	6	24
-	Delegates not awarded by contests	—N/a	—N/a	—N/a	—N/a	—N/a	—N/a	—N/a	—N/a	—N/a	—N/a	—N/a	—N/a	112
Total	United States	—N/a	—N/a	—N/a	11	9	8	27	304½	29½	24	139	50	836

== Results ==
=== February ===
==== Florida primary (February 1) ====
The Green Party held a mail-in primary in Florida on February 1.

Florida Green Party presidential primary (February 1, 2008)
Candidate	Votes	Percentage	National delegates
Cynthia McKinney	-	-	11
Ralph Nader	-	-	2
Kent Mesplay	-	-	1
Kat Swift	-	-	1
Total	-	100%	16

==== Arkansas primary (February 5) ====
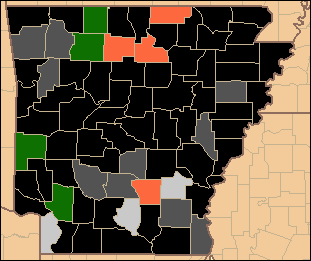
County results of the Arkansas Green presidential primaries, 2008. Uncommitted Tie Cynthia McKinney Jared A. Ball No Votes

Arkansas Green Party presidential primary, February 5, 2008
Candidate	Votes	Percentage	National delegates
Uncommitted	438	55.94%	4
Cynthia McKinney	157	20.05%	2
Jared A. Ball	81	10.34%	1
Kent Mesplay	61	7.79%	1
Kat Swift	46	5.87%	0
Total	783	100%	8

==== California primary (February 5) ====
The California primary took place on February 5. Ralph Nader won, despite not running for the nomination of the party.

California Green Party presidential primary, February 5, 2008
Candidate	Votes	Percentage	National delegates
Ralph Nader	21,726	60.61%	102
Cynthia McKinney	9,534	26.60%	45
Elaine Brown	1,598	4.46%	7
Kat Swift	1,084	3.02%	5
Kent Mesplay	727	2.03%	3
Jesse Johnson	619	1.73%	3
Jared Ball	556	1.55%	3
Total	35,844	100%	168

==== Illinois primary (February 5) ====
The Illinois primary took place on February 5.

Illinois Green Party presidential primary, February 5, 2008
Candidate	Votes	Percentage	National delegates
Cynthia McKinney	1513	56.62%	25
Howie Hawkins	464	17.37%	8
Kent Mesplay	384	14.37%	6
Jared A. Ball	311	11.64%	5
Total	2,672	100%	44

==== Massachusetts primary (February 5) ====
The Massachusetts primary took place on February 5. Six candidates appeared on the ballot. Ralph Nader won, despite not running for the nomination of the party.

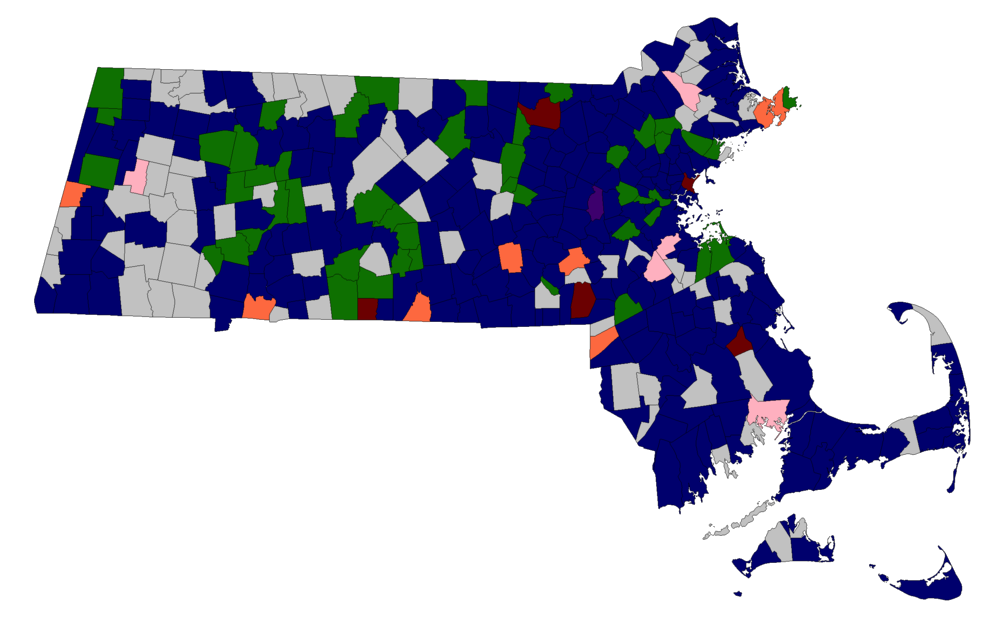
Town results of the Massachusetts Green presidential primaries, 2008. Ralph Nader Cynthia McKinney Kat Swift Jared Ball Kent Mesplay Elaine Brown No Votes

Massachusetts Green-Rainbow presidential primary, February 5, 2008
Candidate	Votes	Percentage	National delegates
Ralph Nader	744	39.91%	32
Cynthia McKinney	474	25.43%	-
Kat Swift	60	3.22%	-
Jared Ball	42	2.25%	-
Kent Mesplay	39	2.09%	-
Elaine Brown	38	2.04%	-
Others	273	25.1%	-
No preference	194	10.41%	-
Blank votes (not tallied)	77	n/a	n/a
Total	1,941	100%	32

==== Maine caucuses (February 10) ====
Maine Green Party caucuses, February 10, 2008
Candidate	Votes	Percentage	National delegates
Cynthia McKinney	36	81.81%	16
Jesse Johnson	4	9.09%	2
Kent Mesplay	1	2.27%	1
Kat Swift	3	6.81%	1
None of the above	3	6.81%	-
Total	44	100%	-

==== District of Columbia primary (February 12) ====
The District of Columbia primary took place on February 12.

District of Columbia Green Party presidential primary, February 12, 2008
Candidate	Votes	Percentage	National delegates
Cynthia McKinney	214	41.07%	-
Write-ins (scattered)	145	27.83%	-
No Candidate	56	10.75%	-
Howie Hawkins	34	6.53%	-
Kat Swift	21	4.03%	-
Jared A. Ball	19	3.65%	-
Kent Mesplay	17	3.26%	-
Jesse Johnson	15	2.88%	-
Total	521	100%	16

=== March ===
==== Mississippi caucuses (March 1) ====
Mississippi held caucuses on March 1.

==== North Carolina (March 1) ====
Mississippi held their vote on March 1.

==== Minnesota caucuses (March 4) ====
The party also held a caucus and mail-in vote on March 4.

The delegates were assigned by a vote at the state convention on June 8.

Minnesota Green Party presidential caucuses, March 4, 2008
Candidate	Votes	Percentage
Cynthia McKinney	114	60.96%
Undecided/No Candidate/None of the Above	33	17.65%
Ralph Nader	19	10.16%
Kent Mesplay	10	5.35%
Kat Swift	9	4.81%
Jesse Johnson	1	0.53%
Write-in	1	0.53%
Total	187	100%

==== Wisconsin Presidential Preference Convention (March 29) ====
Wisconsin selected their delegates at the "Wisconsin Green Party Spring Gathering and Presidential Preference Convention" on March 29. While only McKinney and Mesplay were on the ballot, several other candidates received votes as write-ins.

Wisconsin Presidential Preference Convention, April 7, 2008
Candidate	Votes	Percentage	National delegates
Cynthia McKinney	77	79%	19
Kent Mesplay	-	10%	2
Ralph Nader	-	5%	1
Kat Swift	-	2%	1
Uncommitted	-	2%	1
Jesse Johnson	-	1%	0
Total		100%	24

=== April ===
==== Ohio primary (March 4–April 4) ====
Ohio held a vote-by-mail primary from March 4 through April 4.

==== Rhode Island convention (April 7) ====
Rhode Island Green Party convention, April 7, 2008
Candidate	Votes	Percentage	National delegates
Cynthia McKinney	27	75%	6
Jesse Johnson	9	25%	2
Total	36	100%	8

==== Indiana caucuses (April 9) ====
The Indiana caucuses were party-run rather than state-organized.

Indiana caucuses
Candidate	Votes	Percentage	National delegates
Cynthia McKinney	-	-	7.5
Kent Mesplay	-	-	0.5
Total	-	-	8

==== Connecticut convention (April 26) ====
The Green Party of Connecticut assigned their delegates based upon a vote held at their annual meeting on April 26, 2008.

Connecticut Green Party convention, April 26, 2008
Candidate	Votes	Percentage	National delegates
Cynthia McKinney	33	66%	13
Ralph Nader (write-in)	6	12%	2
Kat Swift	3	6%	1
Kent Mesplay	2	4%	1
Jesse Johnson	2	4%	1
Noam Chomsky (write-in)	1	2%	-
Mike DeRosa (write-in)	1	2%	-
Al Gore (write-in)	1	2%	-
Barack Obama (write-in)	1	2%	-
Total	50	100%	20

=== May ===
==== Maryland primary (May 3) ====
Maryland held a primary where voters could either mail-in their ballots before April 30 or vote in-person at the Maryland Green Party Annual Assembly on May 3.

Maryland Green Party primary, May 3, 2008
Candidate	Votes	Percentage	National delegates
Cynthia McKinney			6
Jesse Johnson			4
Kat Swift			3
Kent Mesplay			3
Total	-	100%	16

==== South Carolina convention (May 3) ====
South Carolina held a party convention on May 3.

==== Missouri convention (May 10) ====
Missouri held a state convention on May 10.

==== Pennsylvania caucuses (April 13—May 10) ====
The Green Party of Pennsylvania's presidential caucuses were held April 13-May 10. These caucuses were party-sponsored rather than state-run.

Green Party of Pennsylvania caucuses, April 13-May 10, 2008
Candidate	Votes	Percentage	National delegates
Cynthia McKinney	-	52.76%	17
None of the above	-	14.17%	5
Uncommitted	-	4.72%	5
Ralph Nader	-	11.02%	4
Jesse Johnson		8.66%	3
Kent Mesplay	-	4.72%	1
Kat Swift	-	2.36%	1
Total	-	100%	32

==== Nebraska primary (May 13) ====
The Nebraska primary took place on May 13.

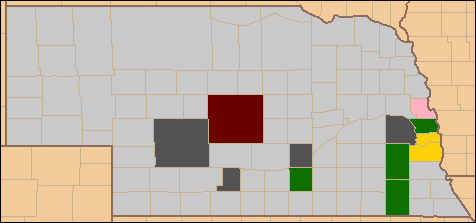
County results of the Nebraska Green presidential primaries, 2008. Cynthia McKinney Jesse Johnson Kat Swift Kent Mesplay Tie No Votes

Nebraska Green Party presidential primary, May 13, 2008
Candidate	Votes	Percentage	National delegates
Cynthia McKinney	40	57.97%	-
Jesse Johnson	13	18.84%	-
Kat Swift	8	11.59%	-
Kent Mesplay	8	11.9%	-
Total	69	100%	8

==== Iowa convention (May 17) ====
The Iowa convention took place on May 17.

Iowa Green Party presidential convention, May 17, 2008
Candidate	Votes	Percentage	National delegates
Cynthia McKinney	-	-	3
Kat Swift	-	-	2
Jesse Johnson	-	-	1
Kent Mesplay	-	-	1
Uncommitted	-	-	1
Total	-	-	8

==== Montana convention (May 31) ====
Montana appointed their eight delegates at a state convention on May 31.

==== New York state primary (May 31) ====
The New York Green Party ballots were publicly counted on May 31. The primary was a party-run mail-in primary.

This primary awarded 28 of New York's 40 delegates. New York City held a separate primary to award the remaining 12 delegates.

New York state primary,
Candidate	Votes	Percentage	National delegates
Cynthia McKinney	-	-	21
Kent Mesplay	-	-	3
Ralph Nader	-		3
Jesse Johnson	-	-	0
Uncommitted	-		2
Total	-	-	28

=== June ===
==== Minnesota convention (June 8) ====
The Minnesota party previously held a caucus and mail-in vote on March 4. The delegates, however, were assigned by a vote at the state convention on June 8.

Minnesota Green Party convention, June 8, 2008
Candidate	Votes	Percentage	National delegates
Cynthia McKinney	-	-	11
Undecided/No Candidate/None of the Above	-	-	1
Ralph Nader	-	-	0
Kent Mesplay	-	-	0
Kat Swift	-	-	0
Jesse Johnson	-	-	0
Write-in	-	-	N/A
Total	-	100%	12

==== New Mexico primary (June 8) ====
The New Mexico Green Party held its vote on June 8. A total of seventeen votes were cast, with 11 going to McKinney, 4 votes going to "none of the above", and 1 vote each going to Kat Swift, Kent Mesplay, and Jesse Johnson.

New Mexico Green Party presidential Primary, June 8, 2018
Candidate	Votes	Percentage	National delegates
Cynthia McKinney	11	64.7%	-
Kat Swift	1	5.9%	-
Kent Mesplay	1	5.9%	-
Jesse Johnson	1	5.9%	-
None of the above	4	23.5%	-
Total	17	100%	-

==== New York City primary (June 8) ====
A second vote awarding New York's remaining 12 delegates was held on June 8 in New York City to appoint a remaining 12 of New York's delegates.

New York City primary Green Party presidential Primary, May 31, 2008
Candidate	Votes	Percentage	National delegates
Cynthia McKinney	-	-	9
Jesse Johnson	-	-	2
Kent Mesplay	-	-	1
Total	-	-	12

==== Texas convention (June 14) ====
The selection of Texas' delegation took place on June 14 at the state Green convention, held at S.H.A.P.E.'s Harambee Center in Houston.

==== Michigan convention (June 26–27) ====
The Michigan convention took place June 26–27 at the Franke Center for the Arts in Marshall, Michigan.

Michigan Green Party presidential convention, July 26–27, 2008
Candidate	Votes	Percentage	National delegates
Cynthia McKinney	-	64%	13
Ralph Nader	-	17%	3
Kat Swift	-	-	1
Kent Mesplay	-	-	1
Total	-	-	19
