= Statewide opinion polling for the April, May, and June 2008 Democratic Party presidential primaries =

This article is a collection of statewide public opinion polls that have been conducted relating to the April, May, and June Democratic presidential primaries, 2008.

== Pennsylvania ==
Pennsylvania winner: Hillary Clinton
Format: Primary see: Pennsylvania Democratic primary, 2008
Date: April 22, 2008
Delegates at stake 188
Delegates won To be determined

=== Tracking Polls ===
Poll source	Date	Highlights
Newsmax/Zogby Tracking Latest Sample size: 675 LV; Latest Margin of error: ± 3.8%	April 20–21, 2008	Clinton 51%, Obama 41%, Someone else 3%, Not sure 6%
Newsmax/Zogby Tracking Latest Sample size: 675 LV; Latest Margin of error: ± 3.8%	April 19–20, 2008	Clinton 48%, Obama 42%, Someone else 4%, Not sure 6%
Newsmax/Zogby Tracking Latest Sample size: 675 LV; Latest Margin of error: ± 3.8%	April 18–19, 2008	Clinton 46%, Obama 43%, Someone else 3%, Not sure 8%
Newsmax/Zogby Tracking Latest Sample size: 675 LV; Latest Margin of error: ± 3.8%	April 17–18, 2008	Clinton 47%, Obama 42%, Someone else 3%, Not sure 8%
Newsmax/Zogby Tracking Latest Sample size: 675 LV; Latest Margin of error: ± 3.8%	April 16–17, 2008	Clinton 47%, Obama 43%, Someone else 2%, Not sure 8%
Newsmax/Zogby Tracking Latest Sample size: 675 LV; Latest Margin of error: ± 3.8%	April 15–16, 2008	Clinton 45%, Obama 44%, Someone else 3%, Not sure 9%

=== Polls ===
Poll source	Date	Highlights
Insider Advantage/Majority Opinion Sample size: 712 LV; Margin of error: ± 3.6%	April 21, 2008	Clinton 49%, Obama 42%, Not Sure 9%
Newsmax/Zogby Sample size: 675 LV; Margin of error: ± 4%	April 20–21, 2008	Clinton 51%, Obama 41%, Someone else 3%, Not sure 6%
American Research Group Sample size: 600; Margin of error: ± 4%	April 20–21, 2008	Clinton 56%, Obama 40%, Other 1%, Undecided 3%
Insider Advantage/Majority Opinion Sample size: 747 LV; Margin of error: ± 3.4%	April 20, 2008	Clinton 49%, Obama 39%, Not Sure 12%
Rasmussen Reports Sample size: 722 LV; Margin of error: ± 4%	April 20, 2008	Clinton 49%, Obama 44%, Not Sure 7%
Public Policy Polling Sample size: 2,338 LV; Margin of error: ± 2%	April 19–20, 2008	Obama 49%, Clinton 46%, Undecided 5%
Newsmax/Zogby Sample size: 602 LV; Margin of error: ± 4.1%	April 19–20, 2008	Clinton 48%, Obama 42%, Someone else 4%, Not sure 6%
Suffolk University Sample size: 600 LV; Margin of error: ± 4%	April 19–20, 2008	Clinton 52%, Obama 42%, Undecided 4%, Refused a response 2%
SurveyUSA Sample size: 710 LV; Margin of error: ± 3.8%	April 18–20, 2008	Clinton 50%, Obama 44%, Other 4%, Undecided 2%
Quinnipiac University Sample size: 1,027 LV; Margin of error: ± 3.1%	April 18–20, 2008	Clinton 51%, Obama 44%, Other 1%, Undecided 4%
Strategic Vision Sample size: 1,200 LV; Margin of error: ± 3%	April 18–20, 2008	Clinton 48%, Obama 41%, Undecided 11%
Newsmax/Zogby Sample size: 607 LV; Margin of error: ± 4.1%	April 18–19, 2008	Clinton 46%, Obama 43%, Someone else 3%, Not sure 8%
American Research Group Sample size: 600; Margin of error: ± 4%	April 17–19, 2008	Clinton 54%, Obama 41%, Other 1%, Undecided 4%
MSNBC/McClatchy/Mason-Dixon Sample size: 625 LV; Margin of error: ± 4%	April 17–18, 2008	Clinton 48%, Obama 43%, Undecided 8%
Newsmax/Zogby Sample size: 608 LV; Margin of error: ± 4.1%	April 17–18, 2008	Clinton 47%, Obama 42%, Someone else 3%, Not sure 8%
Rasmussen Reports Sample size: 730 LV; Margin of error: ± 4%	April 17, 2008	Clinton 47%, Obama 44%, 9% Undecided
Newsmax/Zogby Sample size: 602 LV; Margin of error: ± 4.1%	April 16–17, 2008	Clinton 47%, Obama 43%, Someone else 2%, Not sure 8%
Muhlenberg College Sample size: 322; Margin of error: ±5.5%	April 10–17, 2008	Clinton 47%, Obama 46%, Undecided 7%
Newsmax/Zogby Sample size: 601 LV; Margin of error: ± 4.1%	April 15–16, 2008	Clinton 45%, Obama 44%, Someone else 3%, Not sure 9%
Public Policy Polling Sample size: 1,095; Margin of error: ± 3%	April 14–15, 2008	Obama 45%, Clinton 42%, Undecided 13%
Rasmussen Reports Sample size: 741; Margin of error: ± 4%	April 14, 2008	Clinton 50%, Obama 41%, Undecided 9%
SurveyUSA Sample size: 638; Margin of error: ± 3.9%	April 12–14, 2008	Clinton 54%, Obama 40%, Other 3%, Undecided 3%
Los Angeles Times/Bloomberg Sample size: 623; Margin of error: ± 4%	April 10–14, 2008	Clinton 46%, Obama 41%, Other 1%, Undecided 12%
Strategic Vision Sample size: 1200; Margin of error: ± 3%	April 11–13, 2008	Clinton 49%, Obama 40%, Other/Undecided 11%
American Research Group Sample size: 600; Margin of error: ± 4%	April 11–13, 2008	Clinton 57%, Obama 37%, Other 2%, Undecided 4%
Quinnipiac University Sample size: 2,103; Margin of error: ± 2.1%	April 9–13, 2008	Clinton 50%, Obama 44%, Undecided 6%
Franklin & Marshall College Sample size: 367; Margin of error: ±5.1%	April 8–13, 2008	Clinton 46%, Obama 40%, Undecided 14%
Newsmax/Zogby Sample size: 1,002; Margin of error: ± 3.2%	April 9–10, 2008	Clinton 47%, Obama 43%, Undecided 10%
Susquehanna Polling Sample Size: 500 LV; Margin of Error: ± 4.3%	April 6–10, 2008	Clinton 40%, Obama 37%, Undecided 18%, Other 4%
Temple University Sample size: 583; Margin of error: ± 4%	March 27 – April 9, 2008	Clinton 47%, Obama 41%, Undecided 11%
InsiderAdvantage Sample size: 681; Margin of error: ± 3.6%	April 8, 2008	Clinton 48%, Obama 38%, Undecided 13%
Public Policy Polling Sample size: 1,124; Margin of error: ± 2.9%	April 7–8, 2008	Clinton 46%, Obama 43%, Undecided 11%
Rasmussen Reports Sample size: 695; Margin of error: ± 4%	April 7, 2008	Clinton 48%, Obama 43%, Undecided 9%
SurveyUSA Sample size: 597; Margin of error: ± 4.1%	April 5–7, 2008	Clinton 56%, Obama 38%, Other 4%, Undecided 2%
American Research Group Sample size: 600; Margin of error: ± 4%	April 5–6, 2008	Clinton 45%, Obama 45%, Other 4%, Undecided 6%
Strategic Vision	April 4–6, 2008	Clinton 47%, Obama 42%, Undecided 11%
Quinnipiac University Sample size: 1,340; Margin of error: ± 2.7%	April 3–6, 2008	Clinton 50%, Obama 44%, Other 1%, Undecided 6%
Time Magazine Sample size: 676	April 2–6, 2008	Clinton 44%, Obama 38%, Undecided 18%
Insider Advantage/Majority Opinion Sample size: 659	April 3, 2008	Clinton 45%, Obama 42%, Undecided 12%
Muhlenberg College Sample size: 406; Margin of error: ±5%	March 27 – April 2, 2008	Clinton 49%, Obama 38%, Other 2%, Undecided 11%
Public Policy Polling Sample size: 1,224; Margin of error: ± 2.8%	March 31 – April 1, 2008	Obama 45%, Clinton 43%, Undecided 13%
Rasmussen Reports Sample size: 730; Margin of error: ± 4%	March 31, 2008	Clinton 47%, Obama 42%, Undecided 11%
Quinnipiac University Sample size: 1,549; Margin of error: ± 2.5%	March 24–31, 2008	Clinton 50%, Obama 41%, Other 1%, Undecided 8%
Survey USA Sample size: 588; Margin of error: ± 4,1%	March 29–31, 2008	Clinton 53%, Obama 41%, Someone else 4%, Undecided 2%
Strategic Vision Sampling Size: 504	March 28–30, 2008	Clinton 49%, Obama 41%, Undecided 10%
American Research Group Sample size: 600; Margin of error: ± 4%	March 26–27, 2008	Clinton 51%, Obama 39%, Other 2%, Undecided 8%
Rasmussen Reports Sample size: 690; Margin of error: ± 4%	March 24, 2008	Clinton 49%, Obama 39%, Undecided 12%
Public Policy Polling Sample size: 597; Margin of error: ± 4%	March 15–16, 2008	Clinton 56%, Obama 30%, Undecided 14%
Quinnipiac University Sample size: 1,304; Margin of error: ± 2.7%	March 10–16, 2008	Clinton 53%, Obama 41%, Other 1%, Undecided 6%
Franklin & Marshall College Sample size: 294; Margin of error: ±5.7%	March 11–16, 2008	Clinton 51%, Obama 35%, Other 1%, Undecided 13%
Rasmussen Reports Sample size: 697; Margin of error: ± 4%	March 12, 2008	Clinton 51%, Obama 38%, Undecided 11%
Survey USA Sample size: 608; Margin of error: ± 4%	March 8–10, 2008	Clinton 55%, Obama 36%, Someone else 5%, Undecided 3%
Susquehanna Polling Sample size: 500	March 5–10, 2008	Clinton 45%, Obama 31%, Someone else 4%, Undecided 20%
Strategic Vision Sample size: 1,200; Margin of error: ±3%	March 7–9, 2008	Clinton 56%, Obama 38%, Undecided 6%
American Research Group Sample size: 600; Margin of error: ± 4%	March 7–8, 2008	Clinton 52%, Obama 41%, Someone else 1%, Undecided 6%
Rasmussen Reports Sample size: 690; Margin of error: ± 4%	March 5, 2008	Clinton 52%, Obama 37%, Undecided 11%
Rasmussen Reports Sample size: 820; Margin of error: ± 3%	February 26, 2008	Clinton 46%, Obama 42%, Undecided 12% ‡
Quinnipiac University Sample size: 506 LV; Margin of error: ±4.4%	February 21–25, 2008	Clinton 49%, Obama 43%, Other 1%, Undecided 7% ‡
Franklin & Marshall College Sample size: 303; Margin of error: ±5.6%	February 13–18, 2008	Clinton 44%, Obama 32%, Other 4%, Undecided 20%
Quinnipiac University Sample size: 577 LV; Margin of error: ±4.1%	February 6–12, 2008	Clinton 52%, Obama 36%, Other 1%, Undecided 11%
Franklin & Marshall College Sample size: 627; Margin of error: ±3.9%	January 8–14, 2008	Clinton 40%, Obama 20%, Edwards 11%, Other 6%, Undecided 23%
Quinnipiac University Sample size: 462; Margin of error: ± 4.6%	November 23 – December 3, 2007	Clinton 43%, Obama 15%, Edwards 9%, Biden 5%, Kucinich 3%, Richardson 2%, Dodd 1%, Gravel -, Other 2%, undecided 18%
Quinnipiac University	October 31 – November 5, 2007	Clinton 48%, Obama 15%, Edwards 11%, Biden 3%, Richardson 2%, Kucinich 1%, Dodd -, Gravel -, Other 1%, undecided 15%
Quinnipiac University	October 1–8, 2007	Clinton 41%, Obama 14%, Edwards 11%, Biden 5%, Richardson 3%, Kucinich 3%, Dodd -, Gravel -, Other 2%, undecided 18%
Strategic Vision	September 28–30, 2007	Clinton 42%, Obama 24%, Edwards 9%, Richardson 6%, Biden 5%, Dodd 1%, Kucinich 1%, undecided 12%
Pennsylvania Keystone Poll	August 24 – September 2, 2007	Clinton 38%, Obama 21%, Edwards 17%, Other 6%, Don't Know 18%
Quinnipiac University	14–20 August 2007	Clinton 42%, Gore 13%, Obama 12%, Edwards 8%, Biden 4%, Richardson 1%, Kucinich 1%, Dodd -, Gravel -, Other 2%, undecided 16%
Quinnipiac University	July 30–6 August 2007	Clinton 35%, Obama 19%, Gore 12%, Edwards 10%, Biden 2%, Richardson 2%, Kucinich 1%, Dodd -, Gravel -, Other 2%, undecided 15%
Strategic Vision (R)	July 6–8, 2007	Clinton 36%, Obama 25%, Edwards 12%, Richardson 8%, Biden 5%, Dodd 1%, Kucinich 1%, undecided 12%
Quinnipiac (without Gore)	June 22–28, 2007	Clinton 38%, Obama 22%, Edwards 10%, Biden 6%, Richardson 2%, Dodd 1%, Kucinich 1%, Gravel -, Other 2%, undecided 15%
Quinnipiac (with Gore)	June 22–28, 2007	Clinton 32%, Obama 18%, Gore 16%, Edwards 7%, Biden 5%, Richardson 2%, Dodd 1%, Kucinich 1%, Gravel -, Other 2%, undecided 15%
WTAE/Pittsburgh Tribune-Review Keystone	May 29 – June 4, 2007	Clinton 40%, Edwards 21%, Obama 18%, Other 3%, Unsure 18%
Quinnipiac University	May 22–28, 2007	Clinton 33%, Gore 16%, Obama 13%, Edwards 11%, Biden 3%, Richardson 3%, Kucinich 1%, Wesley Clark -, Dodd -, Gravel -, Other 4%, Unsure 16%
Strategic Vision (R)	13–15 April 2007	Clinton 33%, Obama 23%, Edwards 19%, Biden 3%, Richardson 3%, Dodd 1%, Kucinich 1%, undecided 17%
Quinnipiac University (without Gore)	19–25 March 2007	Clinton 38%, Obama 24%, Edwards 16%, Biden 6%, Richardson 3%, Clark 0%, Dodd 0%, Gravel 0%, Kucinich 0%, Other 1%, Unsure 11%
Quinnipiac University	19–25 March 2007	Clinton 36%, Obama 17%, Gore 13%, Edwards 9%, Biden 4%, Richardson 2%, Clark 0%, Dodd 0%, Gravel 0%, Kucinich 0%, Other 2%, Unsure 16%
Strategic Vision	16–18 March 2007	Clinton 35%, Obama 25%, Edwards 13%, Clark 2%, Biden 3%, Dodd 1%, Kucinich 1%, Richardson 2%, undecided 18%
Quinnipiac University	1–5 February 2007	Clinton 37%, Obama 11%, Edwards 11%, Gore 11%, Biden 5%, Dodd 1%, Kucinich 1%, Richardson 1%, Vilsack 1%, Someone Else 2%, Wouldn't Vote 2%, undecided 17%
American Research Group	16–22 January 2007	Clinton 32%, Obama 13%, Edwards 12%, Biden 8%, Clark 6%, Dodd 2%, Kerry 2%, Kucinich 2%, Gravel 1%, Richardson 1%, Vilsack 1%, undecided 21%

== Indiana ==
Indiana winner: Hillary Clinton
Format: Primary see: Indiana Democratic primary, 2008
Date: 6 May 2008
Delegates at stake 72
Delegates won To be determined

The sample set for some polls in this table is not unique and overlaps with polls from previous days. These polls are marked as Tracking Polls.

Poll source	Date	Highlights
Zogby International Sample Size: 644 (Tracking); Margin of Error: ± 3.9%	May 4–5, 2008	Obama 45%, Clinton 43%, Someone else 5%, Undecided 7% see Indiana Tracking Polls for earlier results
Insider Advantage/Majority Opinion Sample size: 502; Margin of error: ± 4%	May 4, 2008	Clinton 48%, Obama 44%, Undecided 8%
Public Policy Polling Sample Size: 851 LV; Margin of Error ± 3.4%	May 3–4, 2008	Clinton 49%, Obama 44%, Undecided 7%
Suffolk University Sample Size: 600 LV; Margin of Error ± 4%	May 3–4, 2008	Clinton 49%, Obama 43%, Undecided 6%, No Response 2%
Survey USA Sample Size: 675 LV; Margin of Error ± 3.8%	May 2–4, 2008	Clinton 54%, Obama 42%, Undecided 2%, No Response 1%
American Research Group Sample Size: 600 LV; Margin of Error ± 4%	May 2–4, 2008	Clinton 53%, Obama 45%, Undecided 2%
American Research Group Sample size: 600 LV; Margin of error: ± 4%	April 30 – May 1, 2008	Clinton 53%, Obama 44%, Undecided 3%
Insider Advantage/Majority Opinion Sample size: 478; Margin of error: ± 4%	April 30 – May 1, 2008	Clinton 47%, Obama 40%, Undecided 13%
Downs Center/SurveyUSA Sample size: 689; Margin of error: ± 3.8%	April 28–30, 2008	Clinton 52%, Obama 45%, Undecided 5%
Rasmussen Reports Sample size: 400; Margin of error: ±5%	April 29, 2008	Clinton 46%, Obama 41%, Undecided 13%
TeleResearch Corp Sample size: 943; Margin of error: ±3.3%	April 25–29, 2008	Clinton 48%, Obama 38%, Undecided 14%
Public Policy Polling Sample size: 1,388; Margin of error: ±2.6%	April 26–27, 2008	Clinton 50%, Obama 42%, Undecided 8%
SurveyUSA Sample size: 628; Margin of error: ±4%	April 25–27, 2008	Clinton 52%, Obama 43%, Other 3%, Undecided 2%
Howey-Gauge Sample size: 600 LV; Margin of error: ± 4.1%	April 23–24, 2008	Obama 47%, Clinton 45%, Undecided 8%
American Research Group Sample size: 600 LV; Margin of error: ± 4%	April 23–24, 2008	Clinton 50%, Obama 45%, Undecided 5%
Research 2000/South Bend Tribune Sample size: 400 LV; Margin of error: ± 5%	April 23–24, 2008	Obama 48%, Clinton 47%, Undecided 2%
Selzer & Co./Indianapolis Star/WTHR Sample size: 534 LV; Margin of error: ± 4.2%	April 20–23, 2008	Obama 41%, Clinton 38%, Undecided 21%
Downs Center/SurveyUSA Sample size: 578; Margin of error: ±4.2%	April 14–16, 2008	Obama 50%, Clinton 45%, Undecided 5%
Los Angeles Times/Bloomberg Sample size: 687; Margin of error: ±4%	April 10–14, 2008	Obama 40%, Clinton 35%, Other 6%, Unsure 19%
SurveyUSA Sample size: 571; Margin of error: ±4.2%	April 11–13, 2008	Clinton 55%, Obama 39%, Other 3%, Undecided 3%
American Research Group Sample size: 600 LV; Margin of error: ±4%	April 2–3, 2008	Clinton 53%, Obama 44%, Other 1%, Undecided 2%
Research 2000 Sample size: 400; Margin of error: ±5%	March 31 – April 2, 2008	Clinton 49%, Obama 46%, Other 3%, Undecided 2%
Survey USA Sample size: 530; Margin of error: ±4.3%	March 29–31, 2008	Clinton 52%, Obama 43%, Other 4%, Undecided 1%
Howey-Gauge Sample size: 500; Margin of error: ±4.5%	February 18–21, 2008	Obama 40%, Clinton 25%, Unsure 35%

=== Indiana Tracking polls ===
Poll source	Date	Highlights
Zogby International	May 4–5, 2008; Sample Size: 644; Margin of Error: ±3.9%	Obama 45%, Clinton 43%, Someone else 5%, Undecided 7%
Zogby International	May 3–4, 2008; Sample Size: 636; Margin of Error: ± 4%	Obama 44%, Clinton 42%, Someone else 7%, Undecided 8%
Zogby International	May 2–3, 2008; Sample Size: 595; Margin of Error: ± 4.1%	Obama 43%, Clinton 41%, Someone else 8%, Undecided 8%
Zogby International	May 1–2, 2008; Sample Size: 629; Margin of Error: ± 4%	Obama 43%, Clinton 42%, Someone else 7%, Undecided 8%
Zogby International	April 30 – May 1, 2008; Sample Size: 680; Margin of Error: ±3.8%	Clinton 42%, Obama 42%, Someone else 7%, Undecided 9%

== North Carolina ==
: Barack Obama
Format: Primary see: North Carolina Democratic primary, 2008
Date: 6 May 2008
Delegates at stake 115
Delegates won To be determined

The sample set for some polls in this table is not unique and overlaps with polls from previous days. These polls are marked as Tracking Polls.

Poll source	Date	Highlights
Insider Advantage/Majority Opinion Sample size: 774 LV; Margin of error: ± 3%	May 5, 2008	Obama 47%, Clinton 43%, Undecided 10%
Zogby International Sample Size: 643 LV(Tracking); Margin of error: ± 3.9%	May 4–5, 2008	Obama 51%, Clinton 37%, Someone else 4%, Undecided 8% see North Carolina Tracking Polls for earlier results
Insider Advantage/Majority Opinion Sample size: 781 LV; Margin of error: ± 3%	May 4, 2008	Obama 48%, Clinton 45%, Undecided 7%
Public Policy Polling Sample size: 870 LV; Margin of error: ± 3.3%	May 3–4, 2008	Obama 52%, Clinton 42%, Undecided 7%
Survey USA Sample size: 810 LV; Margin of error: ± 3.5%	May 2–4, 2008	Obama 50%, Clinton 45%, Someone else 3%, Undecided 2%
American Research Group Sample size: 600 LV; Margin of error: ± 4%	May 2–4, 2008	Obama 50%, Clinton 42%, Someone else 4%, Undecided 4%
Rasmussen Reports Sample size: 831; Margin of error: ±4	May 1, 2008	Obama 49%, Clinton 40%, Undecided 11%
Insider Advantage/Majority Opinion Sample size: 611; Margin of error: ±3.8%	May 1, 2008	Obama 49%, Clinton 44%, Undecided 7%
American Research Group Sample size: 600; Margin of error: ±4%	April 30 – May 1, 2008	Obama 52%, Clinton 41%, Someone else 2%, Undecided 5%
Research 2000 Sample size: 500; Margin of error: ± 4.5%	April 29–30, 2008	Obama 51%, Clinton 44%, Other 2%, Undecided 3%
Insider Advantage/Majority Opinion Sample size: 571; Margin of error: ±3.8	April 29, 2008	Clinton 44%, Obama 42%, Undecided 14%
Mason Dixon/WRAL Sample size: 400; Margin of error: ±5%	April 28–29, 2008	Obama 49%, Clinton 42%, Other/Undecided 9%
Rasmussen Reports Sample size: 774; Margin of error: ±4	April 28, 2008	Obama 51%, Clinton 37%, Undecided 12%
Survey USA Sample size: 727; Margin of error: ±3.7%	April 26–28, 2008	Obama 49%, Clinton 44%, Other 4%, Undecided 3%
Public Policy Polling Sample size: 1,121; Margin of error: ±2.9%	April 26–27, 2008	Obama 51%, Clinton 39%, Undecided 10%
American Research Group Sample size: 600; Margin of error: ±4	April 26–27, 2008	Obama 52%, Clinton 42%, Someone else 2%, Undecided 4%
Survey USA Sample size: 734; Margin of error: ±3.7%	April 19–21, 2008	Obama 50%, Clinton 41%, Other 5%, Undecided 5%
Public Policy Polling Sample size: 962; Margin of error: ±3.2%	April 19–20, 2008	Obama 57%, Clinton 32%, Undecided 11%
American Research Group Sample size: 600; Margin of error: ±4	April 14–15, 2008	Obama 52%, Clinton 41%, Someone else 2%, Undecided 5%
Insider Advantage/Majority Opinion Sample size: 541; Margin of error: ±4%	April 14, 2008	Obama 51%, Clinton 36%, Undecided 13%
Los Angeles Times/Bloomberg Sample size: 691; Margin of error: ±4%	April 10–14, 2008	Obama 47%, Clinton 34%, Other 2%, Undecided 17%
Public Policy Polling Sample size: 538; Margin of error: ±4.2%	April 12–13, 2008	Obama 54%, Clinton 34%, Undecided 13%
Citivas Institute/TelOpinion Research Sample size: 800; Margin of error: ±3.7%	April 9–10, 2008	Obama 45%, Clinton 27%, Undecided 28%
Survey USA Sample size: 725; Margin of error: ±3.7%	April 5–7, 2008	Obama 49%, Clinton 39%, Other 7%, Undecided 5%
Public Policy Polling Sample size: 928; Margin of error: ±3.2%	April 5–6, 2008	Obama 54%, Clinton 33%, Undecided 13%
Rasmussen Reports Sample size: 704; Margin of error: ±4%	April 3, 2008	Obama 56%, Clinton 33%, Undecided 11%
Charlotte Observer Sample size: 400	March 29 – April 1, 2008	Obama 35%, Clinton 26%, Undecided 39%
Public Policy Polling Sample size: 1,100; Margin of error: ± 3%	March 29–30, 2008	Obama 54%, Clinton 36%, Undecided 9%
American Research Group Sample size: 600; Margin of error: ±4%	March 29–30, 2008	Obama 51%, Clinton 38%, Other 4%, Undecided 7%
Insider Advantage/Majority Opinion Sample size: 460	March 27, 2008	Obama 49%, Clinton 34%, Undecided 17%
Public Policy Polling Sample size: 673; Margin of error: ±3.8%	March 24, 2008	Obama 55%, Clinton 34%, Undecided 11%
Public Policy Polling Sample size: 521; Margin of error: ±4.3%	March 17, 2008	Obama 44%, Clinton 43%, Undecided 13%
Survey USA Sample size: 713; Margin of error: ±3.7%	March 8–10, 2008	Obama 49%, Clinton 41%, Other 6%, Undecided 4%
Rasmussen Reports Sample size: 716; Margin of error: ±4%	March 6, 2008	Obama 47%, Clinton 40%, Undecided 14%
Public Policy Polling Sample size: 508 LV; Margin of error: ±4.3%	March 3, 2008	Obama 47%, Clinton 43%, Undecided 10%
Civitas Institute/Tel Opinion Research (R) Sample size: 800; Margin of error: ±5.7%	February 19–22, 2008	Obama 38%, Clinton 24%, Undecided 38%
Elon University Sample size: 307; Margin of error: ±5.7%	February 18–21, 2008	Obama 45%, Clinton 31%, Undecided 22%
SurveyUSA Sample size: 580; Margin of error: ± 4.2%	February 11, 2008	Obama 50%, Clinton 40%, Other 5%, Undecided 4%
Public Policy Polling (D) Sample size: 676; Margin of error: ± 3.7%	December 3, 2007	Clinton 31%, Edwards 26%, Obama 24%, Other 12%, undecided 8%
SurveyUSA	November 2–5, 2007	Clinton 43%, Edwards 25%, Obama 19%, Other 9%, undecided 5%
Public Policy Polling (D)	November 5, 2007	Edwards 30%, Clinton 30%, Obama 21%, Other 12%, undecided 8%
Civitas Institute	October 9–14, 2007	Clinton 31%, Obama 18%, Edwards 18%, Other 13%, undecided 19%
Public Policy Polling (D)	October 3, 2007	Clinton 32%, Edwards 31%, Obama 20%, Other 10%, undecided 7%
Elon University Polling	September 24–27, 2007	Clinton 37.4%, Edwards 18.0%, Obama 17.7% Biden 3.7%, Richardson 1.3%, Kucinich 0.5%, Other 0.4%, undecided 21.1%
Public Policy Polling (D)	September 5, 2007	Clinton 30%, Edwards 28%, Obama 21%, Other 12%, undecided 10%
Public Policy Polling (D)	August 1–2, 2007	Clinton 29%, Edwards 29%, Obama 23% Other 10%, undecided 8%
Public Policy Polling (D)	July 2, 2007	Clinton 27%, Obama 27%, Edwards 26%, Other 10%, undecided 11%
Civitas Institute	June, 2007	Edwards 25%, Clinton 20%, Obama 18%, Other 12%, undecided 25%
Public Policy Polling (D)	June 4, 2007	Edwards 30%, Clinton 26%, Obama 22%, Other 11%, undecided 11%
Public Policy Polling (D)	May 1–3, 2007	Edwards 33%, Clinton 27%, Obama 20%, Other 10%, undecided 10%
Public Policy Polling (D)	April 2, 2007	Edwards 39%, Clinton 25%, Obama 20%, Other 8%, undecided 9%
Public Policy Polling (D)	5 March 2007	Edwards 29%, Obama 25%, Clinton 21%, Other 13%, undecided 12%
American Research Group	4–7 January 2007	Edwards 30%, Clinton 26%, Obama 19%, Kucinich 3%, Dodd 2%, Richardson 2%, Biden 1%, Kerry 1%, undecided 15%

=== North Carolina Tracking polls ===
Poll source	Date	Highlights
Zogby Tracking	May 4–5, 2008; Sample Size: 643 LV; Margin of error: ± 3.9%	Obama 51%, Clinton 37%, Someone else 4%, Undecided 8%
Zogby Tracking	May 3–4, 2008; Sample Size: 624; Margin of Error: ± 4%	Obama 48%, Clinton 40%, Someone else 5%, Undecided 8%
Zogby Tracking	May 2–3, 2008; Sample Size: 600; Margin of Error: ± 4.1%	Obama 48%, Clinton 39%, Someone else 5%, Undecided 8%
Zogby Tracking	May 1–2, 2008; Sample Size: 627; Margin of Error: ± 4%	Obama 46%, Clinton 37%, Someone else 8%, Undecided 9%
Zogby Tracking	April 30 – May 1, 2008; Sample Size: 668; Margin of Error: ±3.9%	Obama 50%, Clinton 34%, Someone else 8%, Undecided 8%

== West Virginia ==
West Virginia winner: Hillary Clinton
Format: Primary see: West Virginia Democratic primary, 2008
Date: May 13, 2008
Delegates at stake 28
Delegates won To be determined

Poll source	Date	Highlights
Suffolk University Sampling Size: 600; Margin of error: ± 4%	May 10–11, 2008	Clinton 60%, Obama 24%, Other 6%, Undecided 10%
American Research Group Sampling Size: 600; Margin of error: ± 4%	May 7–8, 2008	Clinton 66%, Obama 23%, Other 5%, Undecided 6%
Rasmussen Reports Sampling Size: 840; Margin of error: ± 3.5%	May 4, 2008	Clinton 56%, Obama 27%, Undecided 17%
TSG Consulting/Orion Strategies Sampling Size: 300; Margin of error: ± 6%	May 3, 2008	Clinton 63%, Obama 23%, Undecided 14%
Rasmussen Reports Sampling Size: 702; Margin of error: ±4%	March 13, 2008	Clinton 55%, Obama 27%, Undecided 18%
Charleston Daily Mail	February 26, 2008	Clinton 43%, Obama 22%, Undecided 35%
American Research Group	March 29 – April 2, 2007	Clinton 37%, Obama 22%, Edwards 19%, Biden 3%, Clark 2%, Kucinich 2%, Richardson 2%, Dodd 1%, Gravel 0%, undecided 13%

== Kentucky ==
Kentucky winner: Hillary Clinton
Format: Primary see: Kentucky Democratic primary, 2008
Date: 20 May 2008
Delegates at stake 51
Delegates won To be determined

Poll source	Date	Highlights
Suffolk Sample size: 600; Margin of error: ± 4%	May 17–18, 2008	Clinton 51%, Obama 25%, Edwards 6%, Uncommitted 5%, Undecided 11%
Survey USA Sample size: 629; Margin of error: ± 3.9%	May 16–18, 2008	Clinton 62%, Obama 31%, Other 5%, Undecided 1%
American Research Group Sample size: 600; Margin of error: ± 4%	May 14–15, 2008	Clinton 65%, Obama 29%, Other 4%, Unsure 2%
Survey USA Sample size: 641; Margin of error: ± 3.8%	May 9–11, 2008	Clinton 62%, Obama 30%, Other 6%, Unsure 3%
Mason Dixon/Lexington Herald-Leader/WKYT Sample size: 500; Margin of error: ± 4.5%	May 7–9, 2008	Clinton 58%, Obama 31%, Unsure 11%
Rasmussen Reports Sample size: 800; Margin of error: ±4%	May 5, 2008	Clinton 56%, Obama 31%, Unsure 13%
Survey USA Sample size: 595; Margin of error: ±4%	May 3–5, 2008	Clinton 62%, Obama 28%, Other 8%, Unsure 2%
Survey USA Sample size: 555; Margin of error: ±4.1%	April 26–28, 2008	Clinton 63%, Obama 27%, Other 7%, Unsure 3%
Survey USA Sample size: 557; Margin of error: ±4.1%	April 12–14, 2008	Clinton 62%, Obama 26%, Other 9%, Unsure 4%
Survey USA Sample size: 572; Margin of error: ±4.1%	March 28–30, 2008	Clinton 58%, Obama 29%, Other 10%, Unsure 4%

== Oregon ==
Oregon winner: Barack Obama
Format: Mail-only Primary see: Oregon Democratic primary, 2008
Dates: May 2–20, 2008
Delegates at stake 52
Delegates won To be determined

Poll source	Date	Highlights
Public Policy Polling Sampling Size: 1,296; Margin of error: ± 2.7%	May 17–18, 2008	Obama 56%, Clinton 38%, Undecided 7%
Suffolk Sample size: 600; Margin of error: ± 4%	May 17–18, 2008	Obama 45%, Clinton 41%, Undecided 8%, Refused 6%
Survey USA Sampling Size: 627; Margin of error: ± 4%	May 16–18, 2008	Obama 55%, Clinton 42%, Other 2%, Undecided 1%
American Research Group Sample size: 600; Margin of error: ± 4%	May 14–15, 2008	Obama 50%, Clinton 45%, Undecided 5%
Public Policy Polling Sampling Size: 949; Margin of error: ± 3.2%	May 10–11, 2008	Obama 53%, Clinton 39%, Undecided 7%
Survey USA Sampling Size: 615; Margin of error: ± 4%	May 9–11, 2008	Obama 54%, Clinton 43%, Other 2%, Undecided 2%
Davis, Hibbitts and Midghall/Portland Tribune Sampling Size: 400; Margin of error: ± 4.8%	May 8–10, 2008	Obama 55%, Clinton 35%, Other/Undecided 10%
Rasmussen Reports Sampling Size: 867; Margin of error: ± 3%	May 1, 2008	Obama 51%, Clinton 39%, Undecided 10%
Survey USA Sampling Size: 650; Margin of error: ± 3.9%	April 28–30, 2008	Obama 50%, Clinton 44%, other 2%, undecided 4%
Survey USA Sampling Size: 597; Margin of error: ± 4.1%	April 4–6, 2008	Obama 52%, Clinton 42%, other 4%, undecided 3%
Riley Research Poll Sampling Size: 427; Margin of error: ± 4.74%	January 21–29, 2008	Clinton 36%, Obama 28%, Edwards 14%, other 4%, undecided 13%
Riley Research Poll	August 10–15, 2007	Clinton 26%, Obama 18%, Edwards 17%, Kucinich 2%, Biden 2%
Riley Research Poll	March 5–13, 2007	Clinton 31%, Obama 21%, Edwards 8%, Gore 4%, Richardson 2%

== Puerto Rico ==
Puerto Rico winner: Hillary Clinton
Format: Primary see: Puerto Rico Democratic primary, 2008
Date: June 1, 2008
Delegates at stake 55
Delegates won To be determined

Poll source	Date	Highlights
Vocero/Univision Puerto Rico Sample size: 300LV Margin of error: ± 3.4%	May 8–20, 2008	Clinton 59%, Obama 40%, Undecided 1%
El Vocero/Univision/ Greenberg, Quinlan, Rosner Sample size: 800; Margin of error: ± 3.4%	May 8–20, 2008	Clinton 51%, Obama 38%, Undecided 11%
Research & Research Sample size: 800; Margin of error: ± 4.4%	March 31 – April 5, 2008	Clinton 50%, Obama 37%, Undecided 13%

== South Dakota ==
South Dakota winner: Hillary Clinton
Format: Primary see: South Dakota Democratic primary, 2008
Date: June 3, 2008
Delegates at stake 15
Delegates won To be determined

Poll source	Date	Highlights
American Research Group Sample size: 600; Margin of error: ±4%	May 31 – June 1, 2008	Clinton 60%, Obama 34%, Undecided 6%
Dakota Wesleyan University Sample size:527 Margin of error: ±4%	April 3, 2008	Obama 46%, Clinton 34%, Undecided 10%, No One 6%, Other 4%

== Montana ==
Montana winner: Barack Obama
Format: Primary see: Montana Democratic primary, 2008
Date: June 3, 2008
Delegates at stake 16
Delegates won To be determined

Poll source	Date	Highlights
American Research Group Sample size: 600; Margin of error: ± 4%	May 31 – June 1, 2008	Obama 48%, Clinton 44%, Undecided 8%
Mason-Dixon Sample size: 625; Margin of error: ± 5%	May 19–21, 2008	Obama 52%, Clinton 35%, Undecided 13%
Mason-Dixon	December 17–19, 2007	Clinton 29%, Edwards 19%, Obama 17%
