= 2008 Super Tuesday II =

American presidential primary elections on March 4

Four states held caucuses or primary elections on Super Tuesday II, 2008. Purple represents contests for both parties (4).

Super Tuesday II, 2008 is the name, for 4 March 2008 the day on which the second largest simultaneous number of state presidential primary elections was held for the 2008 presidential election cycle. On this day, Mike Huckabee withdrew from the race when John McCain won enough delegates to claim the Republican nomination for president. It was the second Super Tuesday election of 2008 and took place approximately one month after the first Super Tuesday of this election. The Democratic primaries saw 444 delegates selected on this date, with 265 delegates in the Republican primaries.

== Names and prior election cycles ==
After the front-loading rush that saw twenty-four states hold their caucuses and primaries on Super Tuesday, 2008, only four states -Ohio, Rhode Island, Texas, and Vermont- remained on the traditional March Super Tuesday date. This caused pundits in the states left behind to note that "this year, however, Super Tuesday isn't so super." The 2004 election cycle saw a similar but smaller split, with seven states holding elections in February on Mini-Tuesday, and ten holding contests on Super Tuesday II on the traditional March date.

== Delegate allocation ==
=== Democratic ===
Under Democratic Party rules, all delegates are awarded via proportional representation, with a minimum 15% threshold required to receive delegates. A total of 444 delegates were pledged by the results of the March 4th primaries.

=== Republican ===
The Republican Party does not mandate a proportional representation system for delegate selection, but instead allows each state to determine its selection process. A total of 265 delegates were pledged by the results of the March 4th primaries.

== Results ==
=== Democratic ===
State	Democratic Winner	% of Popular Vote	# Delegates Won	Notes
Ohio	Hillary Clinton	54%	75	primary
Rhode Island	Hillary Clinton	58%	13	primary
Texas	Hillary Clinton (Primary)	51%	65	primary/caucus
Vermont	Barack Obama	59%	9	primary

=== Republican ===
State	Republican Winner	% of Popular Vote	# Delegates Won	Notes
Ohio	John McCain			District WTA + at-large WTA
Rhode Island	John McCain			Delegate names on ballot
Texas	John McCain			District modified WTA + statewide WTA if 50%+
Vermont	John McCain			Statewide WTA

== Super Tuesday III ==
Two states held primary elections on Super Tuesday III. Purple represents states holding elections for both parties (2).

Super Tuesday III was the name for 6 May 2008, the day on which the states of Indiana and North Carolina held primary elections for both the Democratic and Republican nominations. It was a day tied for the fifth-largest simultaneous number of state presidential primary elections to be held in the 2008 presidential election cycle. It was the third Super Tuesday election of 2008 and took place approximately two months after Super Tuesday II, 2008. The Democratic primaries had a total of 218 delegates selected on this date, with 126 delegates chosen in the Republican primaries.

=== Names and prior election cycles ===
Pundits have noted that this is the first time that Indiana has garnered widespread attention from presidential primary candidates since Robert F. Kennedy campaigned in the state during the 1968 election. The unexpected relevance of the Indiana Democratic primary has also resulted in much higher than normal voter registration. Likewise, North Carolina Democratic new voter registrations are triple the number reported for the same time period during the 2004 election.

"Super Tuesday III" was largely considered the "Waterloo" of the Democratic primaries. Obama had been under fire for controversial remarks made by Jeremiah Wright, and his lead in North Carolina polls had been reduced to single digits, so Clinton's double-digit loss in that state was a major disappointment. Further hurting Clinton's campaign was the time-zone differences, as the defeat was reported in prime time, and the news of the narrow victory in Indiana had come too late. MSNBC's Tim Russert was quoted as saying "She did not get the game-changer she wanted tonight." Demographics also played a role as North Carolina featured a lot of African-American as well as young voters in college towns, key groups who have favored Obama during the race. Indiana on the other hand had a significant number of blue-collar and rural voters, groups who favoured Clinton however the race was close as votes from nearly 330,000 people who live in Lake County, directly neighboring Chicago, an Obama stronghold were being counted.

=== Results ===
==== Democratic ====
Under Democratic Party rules, all delegates are awarded via proportional representation, with a minimum 15% threshold required to receive delegates. A total of 218 delegates will be pledged by the results of the May 6th primaries.

State	Democratic Winner	% of Popular Vote	# Delegates Won	Notes
Indiana	Hillary Clinton	51%	37	primary
North Carolina	Barack Obama	56%	44	primary

==== Republican ====
The Republican Party does not mandate a proportional representation system for delegate selection, but instead allows each state to determine its selection process. A total of 126 delegates will be pledged by the results of the May 6th primaries. The Republican primaries on this date were of little importance, as John McCain had already secured enough delegates in prior contests to win the nomination.

State	Republican Winner	% of Popular Vote	# Delegates Won	Notes
Indiana	John McCain	78%	27	WTA
North Carolina	John McCain	74%	69	WTA

== Super Tuesday IV ==
Super Tuesday IV was held on May 20, 2008, consisting of the Democratic Kentucky and Oregon primaries. A total of 125 delegates were seated as a result of these primaries. Hillary Clinton handily won the Kentucky primary and Barack Obama handily won the Oregon primary.

== Notes ==
- WTA is Winner Takes All, and applies solely to Republican contests.

== See also ==
- Mini-Tuesday
- Super Tuesday
- Super Tuesday, 2008
- Presidential nomination process (US)
