= 2008 Delaware Democratic presidential primary =

- February 5, 2008

23 Democratic National Convention delegates (15 pledged, 8 unpledged) The number of pledged delegates received is determined by the popular vote

Candidate	Barack Obama	Hillary Clinton
Home state	Illinois	New York
Delegate count	9	6
Popular vote	51,148	40,760
Percentage	53.07%	42.29%
- Obama: 40–50% 50–60% 60–70% 70–80% 80–90% Clinton: 40–50% 50–60%

The 2008 Delaware Democratic presidential primary was held on Super Tuesday, February 5, 2008, and had a total of 15 delegates at stake. The winner in each of Delaware's subdivisions was awarded those subdivisions' delegates, totaling 10. Another five delegates were awarded to the statewide winner, Barack Obama. The 15 delegates represented Delaware at the Democratic National Convention in Denver, Colorado. Eight other unpledged delegates, known as superdelegates, also attended the convention and cast their votes as well.

== Results ==
Delaware Democratic Presidential Primary Results – 2008
Party	Candidate	Votes	Percentage	Delegates	
Democratic	Barack Obama	51,148	53.07%	9	
Democratic	Hillary Clinton	40,760	42.29%	6	
Democratic	Joe Biden	2,863	2.97%	0	
Democratic	John Edwards	1,241	1.29%	0	
Democratic	Dennis Kucinich	192	0.20%	0	
Democratic	Christopher Dodd	170	0.18%	0	-
Totals		96,374	100.00%	15	
Voter turnout		%		—	

== Analysis ==
Barack Obama's win in the Delaware Democratic Primary can be traced to a number of factors. According to the exit polls, 64 percent of voters in the Delaware Democratic Primary were Caucasian and they favored Clinton by a margin of 56-40 compared to the 28 percent of African American voters who backed Obama by a margin of 86-9. Obama won all age groups except senior citizens ages 65 and over who strongly backed Clinton by a margin of 56-38. Obama also won middle class and more affluent voters making over $30,000 while Clinton won lower middle class and less affluent voters making less than $30,000. Obama also won higher-educated voters (college graduates 60-35; postgraduate studies 66-32) while high school graduates backed Clinton 51-44; both candidates evenly split voters who had some college and/or an associate degree 47-47. Registered Democrats favored Obama 54-42 while Independents also backed him by a margin of 50-44; he also won all ideological groups. Regarding religion, Obama won all major denominations except Roman Catholics who backed Clinton with a 60-35 margin – Obama won Protestants 51-47, other Christians 71-24, and atheists/agnostics 60-35.

Obama performed best in New Castle County, the most populous and urban part of the state which contains Wilmington as well as a large population of African Americans, which he won by a 56.49-39.69 margin of victory. He also narrowly won neighboring Kent County to the south, which contains the state capital of Dover, with 51.76 percent of the vote. Clinton won Sussex County in Southern Delaware, the more rural and conservative part of the state, with 52.73 percent of the vote.

== See also ==
- 2008 Delaware Republican presidential primary
