= 2008 United States presidential election in Indiana =

- November 4, 2008

Nominee	Barack Obama	John McCain
Party	Democratic	Republican
Home state	Illinois	Arizona
Running mate	Joe Biden	Sarah Palin
Electoral vote	11	0
Popular vote	1,374,039	1,345,648
Percentage	49.95%	48.91%

Obama
40–50%
50–60%
60–70%
70–80%
80–90%
90–100%
McCain
40–50%
50–60%
60–70%
70–80%
80–90%
90–100%
Tie/No Data
President before election
George W. Bush
Republican
Elected President
Barack Obama
Democratic

A presidential election was held in Indiana on November 4, 2008, and was part of the 2008 United States presidential election. Voters chose 11 representatives, or electors to the Electoral College, who voted for president and vice president.

Indiana was won by Democratic nominee Barack Obama by 28,391 votes, a 1.03% margin of victory. Prior to the election, major news organizations considered the state as leaning toward Republican nominee John McCain or as a toss-up. On election day, Obama narrowly carried Indiana, becoming the first Democrat to win the state since Lyndon B. Johnson in 1964. This marked what is to date the last time a Democratic presidential nominee has won Indiana.

As of the 2024 presidential election, this is the last time that the Democratic nominee won any of the following counties: Madison, Spencer, Starke, Vanderburgh, and Vermillion, and the last time the state was decided by a single digit margin. Obama's 1,374,039 votes is the most received by a Democratic presidential candidate in the state's history. While both states went to the Democratic nominee, Indiana voted more Democratic in this election than North Carolina, a modern-day swing state, whereas Indiana would return to its Republican roots just four years later.

== Primaries ==
On May 6, 2008, Indiana held its presidential primaries:

- 2008 Indiana Democratic presidential primary
- 2008 Indiana Republican presidential primary

== Campaign ==
=== Predictions ===
There were 16 news organizations who made state-by-state predictions of the election. Their last predictions before election day were:

Source	Ranking
D.C. Political Report	Likely R
Cook Political Report	Toss-up
The Takeaway	Lean R
Electoral-vote.com	Lean R
Washington Post	Lean R
Politico	Lean R
RealClearPolitics	Toss-up
FiveThirtyEight	Lean R
CQ Politics	Toss-up
The New York Times	Toss-up
CNN	Toss-up
NPR	Lean R
MSNBC	Toss-up
Fox News	Toss-up
Associated Press	Toss-up
Rasmussen Reports	Toss-up

=== Polling ===
Pre-election polling was always tight, although McCain generally had a slight lead in 3 poll averages throughout the entire general election, including the final weeks of the election. Rasmussen Reports never had Obama winning a state poll. In the last opinion polling before the election, conducted by Public Policy Polling (October 31-November 2, 2008), Barack Obama led John McCain 49% to 48%. The final 3 poll average gave McCain the lead 49% to 46%, with undecided voters deciding the election.

=== Fundraising ===
John McCain raised a total of $1,758,471 in the state. Barack Obama raised $3,400,475.

=== Advertising and visits ===
Obama massively outspent McCain in this state. Obama and his interest groups spent $17,796,704. McCain and his interest groups spent $3,160,264. The Democratic ticket visited this state 8 times. The Republican ticket visited 5 times.

== Analysis ==
Historically, Indiana has been the most Republican state in the Great Lakes region. However, polling in September and October showed that Indiana was possibly turning into a swing state in 2008. George W. Bush easily captured Indiana's 11 electoral votes in 2004, defeating Democrat John Kerry by more than 20%. In contrast, most polls from the summer of 2008 onward showed only single-digit margins.

The race was as close as expected. Indiana's polls closed at 6 p.m. local time. The state has often been among the first to be called for the Republican candidate; in 2004, for instance, the state was called for Bush almost as soon as the polls in the Central Time Zone portion of the state closed. However, the race for the state was too close to call at 6pm, sending an early signal of potential upset to voters throughout the rest of the country. Indiana still had not been decided when most media outlets declared Obama president-elect at 11 p.m. Eastern time. Indiana was finally called for Senator Obama at around 6 a.m. Eastern on November 5. Ultimately, Obama ended up carrying Indiana with 1,374,039 votes to John McCain's 1,345,648 votes, a difference of 28,391 votes (approximately 1.03% of the total votes cast). The Libertarian candidate polled 29,257 votes - more than the margin of Obama's win. The result was widely seen as an upset considering Indiana's status as a traditionally Republican state. Obama won the contest with a mixture of excellent ground game and internet-powered outreach to potential voters. The efficient use of social media on a scale never seen before in presidential politics also played a role.

At the same time as Obama captured Indiana's 11 electoral votes, incumbent Republican Governor Mitch Daniels was reelected to a second term with 57.84% of the vote over Democrat Jill Long Thompson who received 40.04%. Libertarian Andy Horning received 2.12%. At the state level, Democrats picked up one seat in the Indiana House of Representatives.

After 2008, Indiana quickly returned to being a solidly red state, voting Republican by double-digit margins in every presidential election since. This set it apart from Virginia and North Carolina, the other two states that Obama was the first Democrat to win in several decades. Although, this was also the last election that the Democratic nominee heavily invested or even campaigned in Indiana to this extent. Virginia continued to vote Democratic in presidential elections and to become increasingly Democratic at the state level as well. North Carolina returned to supporting Republican candidates in subsequent elections, but only by relatively narrow margins, with it being considered a key battleground in every presidential election thereafter.

Obama won only 15 of Indiana's counties compared to 77 for McCain. However those 15 counties make up 44% of the state's population. Obama carried the state largely by trouncing McCain in Marion County, home to increasingly Democratic Indianapolis, by over 106,000 votes. Kerry narrowly won Marion County in 2004; prior to that it last supported Democrat Lyndon Johnson in 1964. Obama also won in Vigo County, home to Terre Haute and a noted bellwether; it had voted for the winner of every presidential election all but twice since 1892 (the streak ended in 2020). Not a single county in Indiana voted more Republican in the 2008 election than in 2004. Although Obama lost Allen County, home to Indiana's second-largest city, Fort Wayne, by four points, he won in Fort Wayne city proper by 6 points. Nevertheless, Obama became the first Democrat since Martin Van Buren in 1836 to win the White House without carrying Scott County in Southern Indiana.

Obama also dominated Gary and northwestern Indiana, traditionally the most Democratic region of the state. Many of the voters in this area already knew Obama, as this region makes up most of the Indiana side of the Chicago metropolitan area and the Chicago media market; Obama is from Chicago and has aired ads here for over a decade (dating to his tenure in the Illinois Senate). He also did very well in counties where colleges and universities are located, including St. Joseph (home to South Bend and Notre Dame), Vigo (home to Terre Haute and Indiana State University, Rose–Hulman Institute of Technology, and Saint Mary-of-the-Woods College) Monroe (home to Bloomington and IU), Delaware (home to Muncie and Ball State), Tippecanoe (home to West Lafayette and Purdue), and Porter (home to Valparaiso and Valparaiso University).

McCain dominated Indianapolis's traditionally heavily Republican suburbs, although Obama reduced the Republican margin from past presidential elections. McCain also did well in traditionally Democratic Southern Indiana. Obama only managed to win three counties in this region, one of which was Vanderburgh County, where the city of Evansville is located.

== Results ==
2008 United States presidential election in Indiana
Party	Candidate	Votes	%	±%
Democratic	Barack Obama Joe Biden	1,374,039	49.95	▲10.69
Republican	John McCain Sarah Palin	1,345,648	48.91	▼11.03
Libertarian	Bob Barr Wayne Allyn Root	29,257	1.06	▲0.33
Independent	Chuck Baldwin (write-in) (Note: Baldwin was the national presidential nominee of the Constitution Party.) N/A (Note: Baldwin had no registered running mate in Indiana.)	1,024	0.04	▲0.04
Independent	Ralph Nader (write-in) Matt Gonzalez (write-in)	909	0.03	▼0.02
Green	Cynthia McKinney (write-in) N/A (Note: McKinney had no registered running mate in Indiana.)	87	0.00	Steady
Constitution	Darrell L. Castle (write-in) (Note: Castle was the national vice-presidential nominee of the Constitution Party.) N/A (Note: Castle had no registered running mate in Indiana.)	51	0.00	▲0.00
Socialist	Brian Moore (write-in) Stewart Alexander (write-in)	14	0.00	Steady
America's Independent	Michael L. Faith (write-in) N/A (Note: Faith had no registered running mate in Indiana.)	12	0.00	▲0.00
Independent	Kevin Mottus (write-in) N/A (Note: Mottus had no registered running mate in Indiana.)	9	0.00	▲0.00
Independent	Lawson Mitchell Bone (write-in) N/A (Note: Bone had no registered running mate in Indiana.)	2	0.00	Steady
Independent Republican	Lou Kujawksi (write-in) N/A (Note: Kujawski had no registered running mate in Indiana.)	1	0.00	▲0.00
Independent	Joseph Leroy Plemons (write-in) N/A (Note: Plemons had no registered running mate in Indiana.)	1	0.00	▲0.00
Total votes		2,751,054	100.00	

=== By county ===
County	Barack Obama Democratic		John McCain Republican		Various candidates Other parties		Margin		Total
County	#	%	#	%	#	%	#	%	Total
Adams	4,928	36.40%	8,404	62.07%	207	1.53%	-3,476	-25.67%	13,539
Allen	71,263	47.34%	77,793	51.67%	1,491	0.99%	-6,530	-4.33%	150,547
Bartholomew	13,567	43.64%	17,067	54.90%	455	1.46%	-3,500	-11.26%	31,089
Benton	1,563	40.95%	2,183	57.19%	71	1.86%	-620	-16.24%	3,817
Blackford	2,677	49.12%	2,690	49.36%	83	1.53%	-13	-0.24%	5,450
Boone	9,752	36.54%	16,622	62.27%	318	1.19%	-6,870	-25.73%	26,692
Brown	3,854	47.85%	4,060	50.40%	141	1.75%	-206	-2.55%	8,055
Carroll	3,736	42.77%	4,858	55.61%	142	1.62%	-1,122	-12.84%	8,736
Cass	7,011	44.79%	8,346	53.32%	296	1.89%	-1,335	-8.53%	15,653
Clark	21,953	45.85%	25,326	52.89%	605	1.27%	-3,373	-7.04%	47,884
Clay	4,954	43.48%	6,267	55.00%	174	1.52%	-1,313	-11.52%	11,395
Clinton	5,307	42.79%	6,919	55.79%	175	1.41%	-1,612	-13.00%	12,401
Crawford	2,286	48.19%	2,393	50.44%	65	1.37%	-107	-2.25%	4,744
Daviess	3,370	31.83%	7,098	67.05%	118	1.12%	-3,728	-35.22%	10,586
Dearborn	7,123	32.06%	14,886	67.00%	208	0.94%	-7,763	-34.94%	22,217
Decatur	3,892	37.06%	6,449	61.40%	162	1.54%	-2,557	-24.34%	10,503
DeKalb	7,175	41.78%	9,780	56.95%	219	1.26%	-2,605	-15.17%	17,174
Delaware	28,384	56.80%	20,916	41.85%	676	1.36%	7,468	14.95%	49,976
Dubois	8,748	47.05%	9,526	51.23%	319	1.72%	-778	-4.18%	18,593
Elkhart	31,398	43.83%	39,396	55.00%	840	1.17%	-7,998	-11.17%	71,634
Fayette	4,389	46.30%	4,917	51.87%	173	1.82%	-528	-5.57%	9,479
Floyd	16,263	44.35%	19,957	54.43%	447	1.21%	-3,694	-10.08%	36,667
Fountain	3,094	41.66%	4,158	55.99%	174	2.35%	-1,064	-14.33%	7,426
Franklin	3,404	31.99%	7,018	65.95%	220	2.06%	-3,614	-33.96%	10,642
Fulton	3,702	41.11%	5,147	57.15%	157	1.74%	-1,445	-16.04%	9,006
Gibson	6,455	42.57%	8,449	55.72%	260	1.72%	-1,994	-13.15%	15,164
Grant	11,293	42.87%	14,734	55.93%	317	1.20%	-3,441	-13.06%	26,344
Greene	5,709	41.82%	7,691	56.34%	250	1.83%	-1,982	-14.52%	13,650
Hamilton	49,704	38.45%	78,401	60.64%	1,174	0.91%	-28,697	-22.19%	129,279
Hancock	11,874	34.67%	22,008	64.25%	371	1.08%	-10,134	-29.58%	34,253
Harrison	7,288	40.10%	10,551	58.06%	335	1.84%	-3,263	-17.96%	18,174
Hendricks	24,548	37.73%	39,728	61.07%	778	1.20%	-15,180	-23.34%	65,054
Henry	10,059	47.18%	10,896	51.11%	364	1.70%	-837	-3.93%	21,319
Howard	17,871	46.02%	20,248	52.14%	714	1.84%	-2,377	-6.12%	38,833
Huntington	5,843	35.72%	10,291	62.91%	223	1.36%	-4,448	-27.19%	16,357
Jackson	7,354	42.17%	9,726	55.77%	360	2.07%	-2,372	-13.60%	17,440
Jasper	5,044	39.06%	7,669	59.39%	200	1.54%	-2,625	-20.33%	12,913
Jay	3,748	45.03%	4,401	52.88%	174	2.09%	-653	-7.85%	8,323
Jefferson	6,255	46.30%	7,053	52.21%	202	1.50%	-798	-5.91%	13,510
Jennings	5,312	44.87%	6,261	52.88%	266	2.24%	-949	-8.01%	11,839
Johnson	21,553	36.66%	36,487	62.07%	746	1.26%	-14,934	-25.41%	58,786
Knox	7,569	46.08%	8,639	52.60%	216	1.31%	-1,070	-6.52%	16,424
Kosciusko	9,236	30.60%	20,488	67.87%	461	1.53%	-11,252	-37.27%	30,185
LaGrange	3,663	38.42%	5,702	59.80%	170	1.78%	-2,039	-21.38%	9,535
Lake	139,301	66.64%	67,742	32.41%	1,996	0.95%	71,559	34.23%	209,039
LaPorte	28,258	60.10%	17,918	38.11%	842	1.79%	10,340	21.99%	47,018
Lawrence	7,208	38.89%	11,018	59.45%	308	1.66%	-3,810	-20.56%	18,534
Madison	30,152	52.49%	26,403	45.96%	889	1.55%	3,749	6.53%	57,444
Marion	241,987	63.67%	134,313	35.34%	3,790	1.00%	107,674	28.33%	380,090
Marshall	7,889	42.48%	10,406	56.03%	276	1.48%	-2,517	-13.55%	18,571
Martin	1,706	34.80%	3,122	63.68%	75	1.53%	-1,416	-28.88%	4,903
Miami	5,564	39.30%	8,312	58.72%	280	1.98%	-2,748	-19.42%	14,156
Monroe	41,450	65.39%	21,118	33.32%	819	1.29%	20,332	32.07%	63,387
Montgomery	6,013	39.34%	9,060	59.27%	212	1.39%	-3,047	-19.93%	15,285
Morgan	10,330	35.85%	18,129	62.92%	352	1.22%	-7,799	-27.07%	28,811
Newton	2,625	43.36%	3,301	54.53%	128	2.12%	-676	-11.17%	6,054
Noble	7,064	41.54%	9,673	56.88%	270	1.58%	-2,609	-15.34%	17,007
Ohio	1,158	39.68%	1,713	58.70%	47	1.61%	-555	-19.02%	2,918
Orange	3,390	41.81%	4,536	55.94%	182	2.24%	-1,146	-14.13%	8,108
Owen	3,570	43.70%	4,415	54.04%	185	2.26%	-845	-10.34%	8,170
Parke	2,924	41.83%	3,909	55.92%	157	2.25%	-985	-14.09%	6,990
Perry	5,141	60.55%	3,202	37.71%	147	1.73%	1,939	22.84%	8,490
Pike	2,700	44.79%	3,221	53.43%	107	1.78%	-521	-8.64%	6,028
Porter	39,178	52.77%	33,857	45.60%	1,211	1.63%	5,321	7.17%	74,246
Posey	5,828	45.63%	6,804	53.28%	139	1.09%	-976	-7.65%	12,771
Pulaski	2,466	41.35%	3,388	56.81%	110	1.84%	-922	-15.46%	5,964
Putnam	6,334	43.16%	8,086	55.10%	255	1.74%	-1,752	-11.94%	14,675
Randolph	4,839	44.71%	5,788	53.48%	195	1.81%	-949	-8.77%	10,822
Ripley	4,187	34.22%	7,794	63.71%	253	2.08%	-3,607	-29.49%	12,234
Rush	3,229	42.33%	4,271	55.98%	129	1.69%	-1,042	-13.65%	7,629
Scott	4,271	47.80%	4,445	49.75%	219	2.45%	-174	-1.95%	8,935
Shelby	6,987	39.69%	10,333	58.70%	282	1.60%	-3,346	-19.01%	17,602
Spencer	5,039	49.42%	5,001	49.05%	156	1.53%	38	0.37%	10,196
St. Joseph	68,710	57.87%	48,510	40.85%	1,519	1.28%	20,200	17.02%	118,739
Starke	4,778	50.41%	4,473	47.19%	228	2.41%	305	3.22%	9,479
Steuben	6,284	44.29%	7,674	54.09%	230	1.62%	-1,390	-9.80%	14,188
Sullivan	4,284	48.78%	4,343	49.45%	155	1.76%	-59	-0.67%	8,782
Switzerland	1,638	45.00%	1,940	53.30%	62	1.70%	-302	-8.30%	3,640
Tippecanoe	37,781	55.05%	29,822	43.45%	1,033	1.50%	7,959	11.60%	68,636
Tipton	3,250	41.46%	4,452	56.80%	136	1.73%	-1,202	-15.34%	7,838
Union	1,224	36.48%	2,061	61.43%	70	2.09%	-837	-24.95%	3,355
Vanderburgh	39,423	50.60%	37,512	48.15%	978	1.26%	1,911	2.45%	77,913
Vermillion	4,003	56.10%	3,010	42.19%	122	1.71%	993	13.91%	7,135
Vigo	25,040	57.06%	18,121	41.29%	723	1.65%	6,919	15.77%	43,884
Wabash	5,456	39.27%	8,238	59.30%	198	1.43%	-2,782	-20.03%	13,892
Warren	1,755	43.90%	2,166	54.18%	77	1.93%	-411	-10.28%	3,998
Warrick	12,329	42.93%	16,013	55.75%	379	1.32%	-3,684	-12.82%	28,721
Washington	4,562	40.19%	6,519	57.43%	271	2.38%	-1,957	-17.24%	11,352
Wayne	13,459	46.99%	14,558	50.83%	624	2.18%	-1,099	-3.84%	28,641
Wells	4,403	33.64%	8,504	64.98%	181	1.38%	-4,101	-31.34%	13,088
White	4,839	44.78%	5,731	53.04%	235	2.17%	-892	-8.26%	10,805
Whitley	5,862	38.55%	9,124	59.99%	222	1.46%	-3,262	-21.44%	15,208
Totals	1,374,039	49.84%	1,345,648	48.81%	36,971	1.34%	28,391	1.03%	2,756,658

Counties that flipped from Republican to Democratic

- Delaware (largest city: Muncie)
- Madison (largest city: Anderson)
- Perry (largest city: Tell City)
- Porter (largest city: Portage)
- Spencer (largest city: Santa Claus)
- Starke (largest city: Knox)
- St Joseph (largest city: South Bend)
- Tippecanoe (largest city: Lafayette)
- Vanderburgh (largest city: Evansville)
- Vermillion (largest city: Clinton)
- Vigo (largest city: Terre Haute)

=== By congressional district ===
Although Barack Obama narrowly won the state and its 11 electoral votes, John McCain carried six of nine congressional districts in Indiana, including two held by Democrats.

District	McCain	Obama	Representative
1st	37.38%	61.76%	Pete Visclosky
2nd	44.72%	54.10%	Joe Donnelly
3rd	56.22%	42.84%	Mark Souder
4th	55.92%	43.01%	Steve Buyer
5th	58.84%	40.24%	Dan Burton
6th	52.46%	46.18%	Mike Pence
7th	28.35%	70.89%	André Carson
8th	51.32%	47.42%	Brad Ellsworth
9th	50.26%	48.50%	Baron Hill

== Electors ==
Technically the voters of Indiana cast their ballots for electors: representatives to the Electoral College. Indiana is allocated 11 electors because it has 9 congressional districts and 2 senators. All candidates who appear on the ballot or qualify to receive write-in votes must submit a list of 11 electors, who pledge to vote for their candidate and their running mate. Whoever wins a plurality of votes in the state is awarded all 11 electoral votes. Their chosen electors then vote for president and vice president. Although electors are pledged to their candidate and running mate, they are not obligated to vote for them. An elector who votes for someone other than their candidate is known as a faithless elector.

The electors of each state and the District of Columbia met on December 15, 2008, to cast their votes for president and vice president. The Electoral College itself never meets as one body. Instead the electors from each state and the District of Columbia met in their respective capitols.

The following were the members of the Electoral College from the state. All 11 were pledged to Barack Obama and Joe Biden:

1. Jeffrey L. Chidester
2. Butch Morgan
3. Michelle Boxell
4. Charlotte Martin
5. Jerry J. Lux
6. Connie Southworth
7. Alan P. Hogan
8. Myrna E. Brown
9. Clarence Benjamin Leatherbury
10. Daniel J. Parker
11. Cordelia Lewis Burks

== See also ==
- United States presidential elections in Indiana
