= Voter Participation Center =

American nonprofit political organization

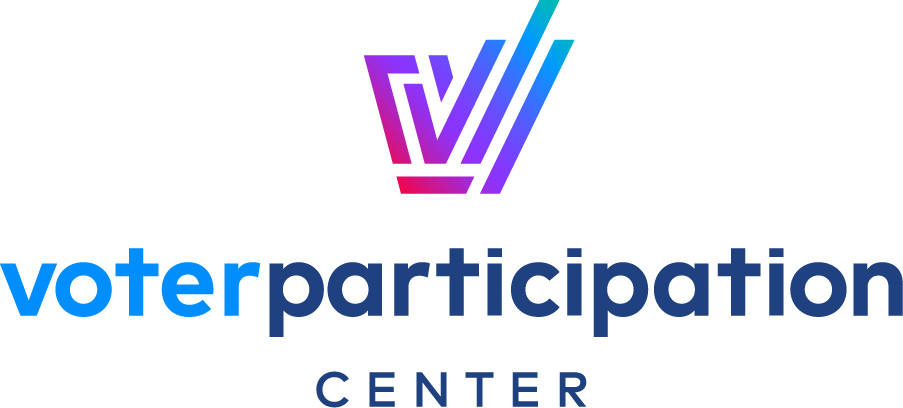
- Formation: 2003; 23 years ago
- Type: 501(c)(3) and 501(c)(4)
- Purpose: Voter registration
- Headquarters: Washington, D.C., U.S.
- Founder: Page Gardner
- President and CEO: Tom Lopach
- Affiliations: Center for Voter Information, Women's Voices Women Vote Action Fund
- Website: www.voterparticipation.org

The Voter Participation Center (VPC) is a U.S.-based 501(c)(3) non-profit organization whose stated aim is to increase voter registration among young people, people of color, and unmarried women, a group it calls "The New American Majority." Its sister organization, the Center for Voter Information, is a 501(c)(4) organization that conducts get-out-the-vote campaigns. VPC runs a large direct mail program, sending voter registration materials to targeted voters. It also produces research material on demographic and voting trends. Between 2004 and 2020, they registered more than four million voters. Some election officials and campaigns have contested the group's methods of voter registration and voter turnout. ProPublica reported that VPC's 501(c)(4) sister organization, Center for Voter Information, has "ties to Democrats" and that election officials said that "a flood of mailers" from them "contained mistakes and confused voters at a time when states are racing to expand vote by mail." Election officials said they wished it would stop. Before the 2024 election, the Maryland Attorney General's Office accused VPI of violating the Voting Rights Act and Maryland law and issued a cease-and-desist letter to the group, ordering that the nonprofit stop sending letters to Maryland voters.

== Organization background ==
In 2003, VPC was founded as Women's Voices Women Vote (WVWV) by Democratic political consultant Page Gardner as a project aimed at increasing the participation of unmarried women. Gardner announced she would step down from VPC effective November 15, 2020. WVWV was formed specifically to focus on the "marriage gap", and has promoted the term through its research, which determined that marital status is a key determinant of registration and voting, with unmarried women registering to vote and voting in elections at lower rates than married women.

In 2008, the organization broadened its focus to include the other demographic groups that constitute what it calls the "New American Majority" (NAM), while still retaining a particular interest in unmarried women. WVWV coined the term "New American Majority" to refer to groups including unmarried women, people of color and young people who constitute a majority of voting eligible citizens.

In 2011, Women's Voices Women Vote formally changed its name to the Voter Participation Center, to reflect a broadening of programmatic focus. The VPC's 501(c)(4) sister organization, Women's Voices Women Vote Action Fund, continues to operate as the Center for Voter Information. The center has partnered with national voting groups including Voto Latino. The organization says that it provides its research material, test findings and models to other local, state and national non-profit organizations interested in increasing voter participation among unmarried women, people of color and young people. VPC's tax forms show revenue of $26 million in 2019 and $4.9 million in assets.

== Activities ==
The VPC's programs focus on increasing voter registration, turnout, awareness of issues and civic involvement of demographic groups including unmarried women, people of color and young people. Many VPC programs focus on unmarried women, as this group forms a large proportion of what the VPC terms the "New American Majority" and its research indicates that marital status is a key factor in determining civic participation. Since its inception in 2003, the VPC has focused its work on efforts to register one million voters. Its registration programs have largely focused on distributing applications to register by mail and encouraging their return, and reminding people to vote. Getting registrants to vote in an election is another focus of the organization. Its vote-by-mail programs are tested with a control group before being rolled out.

WVWV has issued several reports commissioned from Lake Research Partners on the changing demographics of America, tracking the growth, socio-economic characteristics and voting behavior of unmarried women and other demographic groups.

=== 2004 election ===
WVWV released its first two studies in March 2004, one in collaboration with pollsters Anna Greenberg and Stan Greenberg, the other with Celinda Lake. These studies found that single women register to vote and vote at a markedly lower rate than married women and that marital status is a top determinant in whether one registers and/or votes. They concluded that if unmarried women had voted at the same rates as married women in the 2000 election, the numbers would have been enough to have decidedly changed the outcome of the election in favor of Al Gore.

In October 2004, actress Jennifer Aniston recorded a televised public service announcement for the group encouraging unmarried, separated, divorced and widowed women to register and to vote in the 2004 election.

=== 2006 election ===
In 2006 and 2010, WVWV partnered with the National Women's Law Center to create information sheets for women on voting topics relevant to them.

=== 2008 election ===
According to the VPC, in 2008, the organization generated slightly fewer than one million voter registration applications in 35 states.

In 2007, in preparation for the 2008 presidential election, the organization launched a public service campaign in November 2007, featuring actress Julia Louis-Dreyfus in a replica of the Oval Office. The organization also produced the "Our First Time" campaign, which featured well-known women revealing the details of their first time voting. In addition to the commercials, the organization sent out mailings enclosing voter registration forms to unregistered single women voters and also carried out automated calls, informing them that they would receive such mailings.

During the 2008 North Carolina Democratic Primary the group ran into legal trouble when it was reported by National Public Radio and the Center for Investigative Reporting that automated calls had been made to African-American voters providing confusing information, which may have misled voters to believe that they were not registered to vote. The robocalls did not identify the VPC as the caller. Attorney General Roy Cooper ordered the calls to stop, and the organization was ordered to pay a $100,000 fine.

In 2008, a number of VPC's vendor contracts were called into question after it was revealed that VPC had paid Integral Resources Inc. nearly $800,000 for phone services. Integral Resources Inc. was then run by the late Ron Rosenblith, who was married to former VPC-CVI President and Founder Page Gardner. VPC also paid several million dollars more on contracts with companies run by five additional then-members of the group's board of directors.

=== 2010 election ===
In addition, WVWV research has also documented obstacles to voter registration and election reforms best suited to improve voter registration and turnout numbers. According to WVWV research, some of the greatest barriers to voter participation include unnecessary rules limiting early and absentee voting, voter identification requirements, and inconsistent state regulations concerning voter lists and registration guidelines. In an effort to focus the attention of lawmakers and election reform groups on these obstacles, WVWV released a report titled, "Access to Democracy: Identifying Obstacles Hindering the Right to Vote".

The VPC also focuses on educating policymakers and media on issues impacting what it calls the "New American Majority", including a series of reports produced in March 2010, in partnership with the Center for American Progress. The VPC and CAP papers focused on the impact of legislative issues including healthcare, childcare, paycheck fairness and training in non-traditional professions on the economic security of unmarried women. Later that year, in October 2010, the organization released a joint study with Greenberg Quinlan Rosner Research focusing on voting trends, which found that unmarried women favor Democratic candidates by a 67 percent to 28 percent margin. In comparison, the same study found that married women lean Republican by 52 percent to 40 percent. According to Page Gardner, the study's results suggest that there is not a traditional gender gap between men and women, but rather a gap between unmarried and married women.

=== 2012 election ===
In 2012, the New American Majority constituted 115 million voters and 53.5% of the population. Republican election officials and the Mitt Romney campaign criticized VPC for sending mail to names and addresses that might not be able to register. But the Virginia State Board of Elections rejected a request from Romney's campaign to invalidate the VPC-generated voter registration applications. Democratic Virginia state representative Alfonso H. Lopez defended VPC writing about this history of voter suppression in America and noting, "...focusing on these harmless errors to attack the efforts of the Voter Participation Center to bring more Americans into our democratic process does the organization an injustice."

=== 2014 election ===
In 2014, VPC published a video featuring actresses Felicity Huffman and Rosario Dawson encouraging women to register and to vote.

=== 2016 election ===
In 2016, the group mailed 7.4 million registration forms to voters in 13 states, including 950,000 in Georgia.

=== 2018 election ===
In 2018, the group calculated that there are 142 million people in the New American Majority, comprising 62 percent of the U.S. voting-eligible population.

=== 2020 election ===
The Voter Participation Center launched the largest voter campaign in its history in 2020, with a goal of registering one million voters. Ahead of the 2020 election, the group said it was mailing 5.4 million registration forms, including 520,000 in Pennsylvania. The group also conducted polling that found young people, people of color and unmarried women were likely to vote against Donald Trump, including a growing number of working class white women, many of whom voted for him in 2016. The group has also argued that aggressive deadlines for registering to vote disenfranchises many voters. Some election officials criticized the center for its poor targeting of unregistered voters early in the 2020 election cycle on account of the already-registered or ineligible voters who received mailers. However, former VPC-CVI President and Founder, Page Gardner, noted that only a small percentage of mailers were mistargeted, and some election officials have noted that the center's campaign is much better at targeting voters than other similar efforts. Later in June 2020, the group again received criticism after sending pre-filled absentee ballot request forms to up to 80,000 North Carolinians. These absentee ballot request forms had sections already filled in, a practice banned in 2019 by the N.C. General Assembly. The N.C. State Board of Elections said that while CVI provided sample mailings to review, the "State Board staff did not catch the pre-filled forms at that time." The center announced that they would send out another 400,000 mailings that will include blank absentee ballot request forms, which are valid.

=== 2024 election ===
In the weeks before the 2024 presidential election, VPC mailed people across the U.S. letters claiming to be a "Voting Report Card", which listed the voter's name, address, and voting records beginning with the 2016 general election. It also showed what it claims are voting records of neighbors. Some recipients called the letters invasive, intimidating, and threatening, as the mailer says that the VPI "will be reviewing these records after the election to determine whether or not you joined your neighbors in voting."

Before the election, the Maryland Attorney General's Office issued a cease-and-desist letter to the organization, ordering that the group stop sending letters to Maryland voters. The attorney general's letter accused CVI and its sister organization, the Voter Participation Center, of violating Maryland law and the Voting Rights Act. Statements from the mailer such as "we will be reviewing these records after the election to determine whether or not you joined your neighbors in voting" imply that a person's voting record will be revealed and pressures them.
