= Super Tuesday, 2008 =

United States election date

Twenty-four states held caucuses or primary elections on Super Tuesday, 2008. Blue denotes Democratic-only contests (3), red denotes Republican-only contests (2), and purple represents contests for both parties (19). Note: American Samoa (not shown) is Democratic only.

Super Tuesday 2008, Super Duper Tuesday, Mega Tuesday, Giga Tuesday, Tsunami Tuesday, and The Tuesday of Destiny are names for February 5, 2008, the day on which the largest simultaneous number of state U.S. presidential primary elections in the history of U.S. primaries were held. Twenty-four states and American Samoa held either caucuses or primary elections for one or both parties on this date. Furthermore, the week-long Democrats Abroad Global Primary began on this day.

The large number of states that held elections on February 5 could have shortened the period between the first caucus in Iowa, on January 3, 2008, and the de facto selection of a party's nominee to just a few weeks. Super Tuesday 2008 saw 52% of the Democratic and 41% of the Republican delegates awarded by early February 2008. By comparison, only about 1% of nominating convention delegates had been selected by that point in the 2000 election cycle. It was held approximately one month before Super Tuesday II.

== Names and prior election cycles ==
The name "Super Duper Tuesday" is a reference to earlier Super Tuesdays, the dates on which the largest number of presidential primaries took place. The term "Super Duper Tuesday" has been repeatedly re-coined to refer to even more states holding their primaries on this date, with the first recorded usage so far found dating back to 1985. In 2004, Super Tuesday fell on March 2. In 2004, the equivalent cohort of primaries, on February 3, 2004, was called "Mini-Tuesday"—only seven states held their primaries on that date.

On June 3, 2007, the name "Tsunami Tuesday"—conveying the potential of the large number of simultaneous primaries to completely change the political landscape—was mentioned on Meet the Press during a round-table discussion with presidential campaign strategists James Carville, Bob Shrum, Mary Matalin, and Mike Murphy.

Super Tuesday in 2008 occurred during Mardi Gras and on the day of the New York Giants Super Bowl victory parade. Voting was hampered in several states by a major tornado outbreak that killed 57 people, and competed with the primaries for the news. (Due to such influence, the outbreak was named after the primaries.)

== Scheduling ==
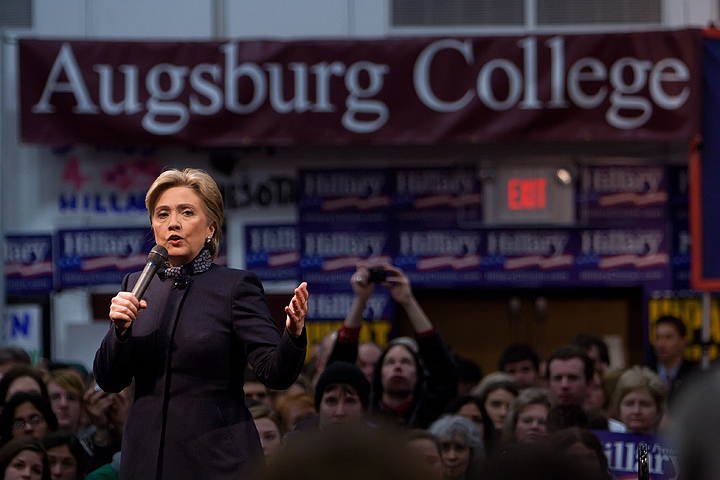
Democratic candidate Hillary Clinton campaigning at Augsburg College in Minneapolis, Minnesota, two days before the twenty-two state vote

As of February 2007, eight states planned to hold primary or caucus elections on Super Tuesday, February 5, 2008: Alabama, Arkansas, Delaware, Missouri, New Mexico Democrats, North Dakota, Oklahoma, Utah, and West Virginia Republicans^{‡}. However to increase their importance in the candidate selection process, several states moved up their contests, which some pundits criticized as being "pure self-interest."

The following states changed their elections to February 5: Alaska, Arizona, California, Colorado, Connecticut, Georgia, Idaho Democrats, Illinois, Kansas Democrats^{†}, Massachusetts, Minnesota, Montana Republicans^{§}, New Jersey, New York, and Tennessee.

In an attempt to keep states from moving their primary or caucus elections even earlier, the Democratic National Committee and Republican National Committee established penalties for states holding elections earlier than February 5, 2008. As a result, the Democratic National Committee controversially stripped the states of Michigan and Florida of all pledged convention delegates. The Republican National Committee reduced by half the number of convention delegates from five states: Wyoming, New Hampshire, South Carolina, Florida, and Michigan.

=== Response ===
Advocates for earlier elections point out that voters could have fewer candidates to select from with a later contest, because candidates who do not fare well in the early primaries and caucuses often drop out. Additionally, presidential campaigns spend large sums of money on advertising, hotel rooms, and campaign staff, which can be an economic boon to states holding earlier elections.

Critics of the earlier polling date claim it will compress the primary campaign cycle down to a three-week national campaign where only financially well-off candidates can compete. CNN political pundit Bill Schneider states:

Those states may move up on the calendar because they want a cut of the action. They want less attention paid to small states like Iowa and New Hampshire and more attention paid to big, diverse states like Florida and California. To run in those big states, you need big money and national name recognition. Obscure contenders need not apply.

Others indicate it will ultimately leave voters out of the process. In a BBC News interview, William F. Galvin, the Massachusetts Secretary of the Commonwealth said:

The people who are being left out of this are the voters, especially those who aren't active in party affairs ... There won't be enough time for voters to focus on these candidates.

Regardless of the number of states moving their election dates earlier and earlier, New Hampshire vigorously maintained its 'first in the nation' primary status. By New Hampshire state law, the secretary of state has sole discretion to set the date of the primary. Bill Gardner, the Secretary of State of New Hampshire for the past 31 years, did not rule out any dates for the primary election, and even intimated that "it could be this year 2007." Ultimately, however, the New Hampshire primary was held on January 8, 2008.

== Delegate allocation ==
=== Democratic ===
Under Democratic Party rules, all delegates were awarded via proportional representation, with a minimum 15% threshold required to receive delegates. A total of 1,664 delegates were pledged by the results of the February 5 votes.

=== Republican ===
The Republican Party did not mandate a proportional representation system for delegate selection, but instead allowed each state to determine its selection process. A total of 1,069 delegates were pledged by the results of the February 5 votes.

== Results ==
State	Democratic Winner	% of Popular Vote	# Delegates Won	Republican Winner	% of Popular Vote	# Delegates Won	Show/Place Notes
Alabama	Barack Obama	56%	27	Mike Huckabee	41%	20	
Alaska (C)	Barack Obama	75%	9	Mitt Romney	45%	12	
American Samoa^{¤} (C)	Hillary Clinton	57%	2				
Arizona	Hillary Clinton	51%	31	John McCain	48%	50	(WTA for GOP.)
Arkansas	Hillary Clinton	73%	27	Mike Huckabee	62%	32	
California	Hillary Clinton	52%	204	John McCain	44%	149	
Colorado (C)	Barack Obama	67%	33	Mitt Romney	57%	43	
Connecticut	Barack Obama	51%	26	John McCain	52%	27	(WTA for GOP.)
Delaware	Barack Obama	53%	9	John McCain	45%	18	(WTA for GOP.)
Georgia	Barack Obama	67%	59	Mike Huckabee	34%	69	(WTA for GOP.)
Idaho (C)	Barack Obama	79%	15				
Illinois	Barack Obama	65%	104	John McCain	47%	55	
Kansas^{†} (C)	Barack Obama	74%	23				
Massachusetts	Hillary Clinton	56%	55	Mitt Romney	51%	22	
Minnesota (C)	Barack Obama	66%	48	Mitt Romney	42%	38	
Missouri	Barack Obama	49%	36	John McCain	33%	58	(WTA for GOP.)
Montana^{§} (C)				Mitt Romney	38%	25	
New Jersey	Hillary Clinton	54%	59	John McCain	55%	52	(WTA for GOP.)
New Mexico (C)	Hillary Clinton	49%	14				
New York	Hillary Clinton	57%	139	John McCain	51%	101	(WTA for GOP.)
North Dakota (C)	Barack Obama	61%	8	Mitt Romney	36%	8	
Oklahoma	Hillary Clinton	55%	24	John McCain	37%	32	
Tennessee	Hillary Clinton	54%	40	Mike Huckabee	34%	21	
Utah	Barack Obama	57%	14	Mitt Romney	88%	36	(WTA for GOP.)
West Virginia^{‡}				Mike Huckabee	52%	18	(WTA for GOP.)

=== Democrats ===
	Number of contests won	Number of delegates won
Barack Obama	13	847
Hillary Clinton	10	834

	Popular vote	Percentage of popular vote
Hillary Clinton	8,081,748	46%
Barack Obama	7,987,274	45%

=== Republicans ===
	Number of states won
John McCain	9
Mitt Romney	7
Mike Huckabee	5
Ron Paul	0

	Popular Vote
John McCain	3,992,066
Mitt Romney	3,267,634
Mike Huckabee	1,902,820
Ron Paul	434,093

== See also ==
- Mini-Tuesday
- Super Tuesday
- Super Tuesday II, 2008
- 2008 Super Tuesday tornado outbreak

== Notes ==
- The New Mexico Democratic Caucus came down to provisional ballots. The counting process took 9 days to complete.
- † The Kansas state legislature voted to neither fund nor hold a primary in 2008.
- ‡ West Virginia Republicans will select 18 of their 30 delegates on February 5, with the final 12 chosen on May 13.
- § Montana Republicans chose to select delegates using a "closed caucus" comprising approximately 3,000 Republican elected officials and state party officials, such as precinct captains.
- ¤ American Samoa is an unincorporated territory of the United States with three delegates to the Democratic National Convention, but no vote in the presidential election.
- (C) denotes states and territories holding caucuses.
- (WTA) means Winner Takes All, and applies solely to Republican contests.

Popular Vote Percentages reflect the percentage within each party, not state overall total votes cast.
