= Nebraska Green Party =

Nebraska affiliate of the Green Party

- Headquarters: P.O. Box 85442 Lincoln, Nebraska, 68501-5442
- Ideology: Green politics
- Political position: Left-wing
- National affiliation: Green Party of the United States
- Colors: Green

Website
- Nebraska Green Party

The Nebraska Green Party is the state party organization for Nebraska of the Green Party of the United States. It held its first convention in August 2000 at a Unitarian church in Lincoln, Nebraska.

== History ==
In the 2004 election three Congressional candidates, Roy Guisinger, party Co-Chair Steve Larrick, and Dante Salvatierra garnered a total of over 10,000 votes statewide. The party lost its ballot access after the 2004 general election. In order to maintain status as an officially recognized party in Nebraska, Green Party candidates must garner at least five percent of the vote in federal or state electoral races. In 2004, these offices were limited to President and the House of Representatives. This led to the Green Party being recognized in the 1st District, but not in the 2nd District and 3rd District. Petition drives qualified the Greens in all three districts in 2006.

During the 2006 elections Doug Paterson received over 5% of the vote for Secretary of State, earning the party Statewide Ballot Status for 2008.

According to Nebraska voter registration statistics there were 444 registered greens in the state in 2006. By the November 2008 election that total had more than doubled to 1,041.

In November 2007 Steve Larrick declared his intention to run for US Senate in the 2008 elections.

== Presidential elections ==
Year	Nominee	Votes
1996	Ralph Nader	Not on ballot
2000	Ralph Nader	24,540 (3.52%)
2004	David Cobb	978
2008	Cynthia McKinney	1,028
2012	Jill Stein	Not on ballot
2016	Jill Stein	8,775
2020	Howie Hawkins	Not on ballot
2024	Jill Stein	2,887

== Elected officials ==
- Steve Larrick, Lower Platte 5, Natural Resources District, Lincoln
