= 2008 North Carolina Democratic presidential primary =

- May 6, 2008

Candidate	Barack Obama	Hillary Clinton
Home state	Illinois	New York
Delegate count	67	48
Popular vote	887,391	657,669
Percentage	56.14%	41.61%
- Primary results by county Obama: 40–50% 50–60% 60–70% 70–80% Clinton: 40–50% 50–60% 60–70% 70–80%

The 2008 North Carolina Democratic presidential primary took place on May 6, 2008, one of the last primary elections in the long race for nomination between Barack Obama and Hillary Clinton. Obama won the primary.

North Carolina sent 134 delegates to the 2008 Democratic National Convention. 115 delegates were tied to the results of the primary, with the remainder being unelected superdelegates not pledged to any candidate. Registered Democrats and unaffiliated voters (but not registered Republicans) were allowed to participate. The polls were open from 6:30 AM to 7:30 PM, Eastern daylight time (UTC-4). North Carolina had 5,811,778 registered voters in 2,817 precincts, with turnout at 36.42%.

== Polls ==
Public opinion polling from early January 2008 through mid-February 2008 generally gave Senator Hillary Clinton a single digit lead over Senator Barack Obama. From then on, Obama had the lead in almost every poll, and on May 5, was up by 3%, holding 48% to her 45%. 7% were undecided, with a margin of error of 3%. The new polls gave "fresh hope" to Clinton.

== Robocalls ==
The North Carolina state board of elections reported that misleading robocalls were made to African-American voters in the days leading up to the primary in late April 2008, which essentially told registered voters that they were not registered. According to NPR and Facing South, these calls were made by the organization "Women's Voices Women Vote."

"Women's Voices Women Vote" included members such as former White House chief of staff John Podesta, Maggie Williams, and Page Gardner, all of whom have close ties to the Clintons. Voters and watchdog groups complained that it was a turnout-suppression effort, and the state Attorney General Roy Cooper ordered them to stop making the calls.

== Results ==
Primary date: May 6, 2008

National pledged delegates determined: 115

Key:	Withdrew prior to contest

North Carolina Democratic presidential primary, 2008 Official Results
Candidate	Votes	Percentage	Estimated national delegates
Barack Obama	887,391	56.14%	67
Hillary Clinton	657,669	41.61%	48
Mike Gravel	12,452	0.79%	0
No Preference	23,214	1.47%	0
Totals	1,580,726	100.00%	115

The day that the North Carolina primary was held was known as Super Tuesday III. Along with Indiana which held its primary on the same day, this was largely considered the "Waterloo" of the Democratic primaries. Obama had been under fire for controversial remarks made by Jeremiah Wright, and his lead in North Carolina polls had been reduced to single digits, so Clinton's double-digit loss in that state was a major disappointment. Further hurting Clinton's campaign was the time-zone differences, as the defeat was reported in prime time, and the news of the narrow victory in Indiana had come too late. MSNBC's Tim Russert was quoted as saying "She did not get the game-changer she wanted tonight."

== Analysis ==
2008 North Carolina Democratic presidential primary
Demographic subgroup	Obama	Clinton	% of total vote
Total vote	56	42	100
Sex
Male	56	40	43
Female	54	42	57
Sex by race
White men	40	54	28
White women	33	63	35
Black men	91	7	13
Black women	91	5	20
Age
17–64 years old	59	37	77
65 and older	41	54	23
Family income
Less than $50,000	59	36	46
$50,000 or more	52	45	54
Religion
Protestant/Other Christian	53	44	70
Catholic	45	52	9
Something else	69	24	7
None	68	29	12
Education
Did not complete high school	57	38	6
High school graduate	56	39	24
Some college or associate degree	53	42	26
College graduate	54	43	25
Postgraduate study	57	41	19
Political philosophy
Liberal	62	36	40
Moderate	55	41	38
Conservative	42	51	22
Which issue is the most important facing the country?
The economy	52	44	60
The war in Iraq	60	36	22
Health care	59	36	15
Candidate quality that matters most
Can bring about needed change	77	21	50
Cares about people like me	56	37	14
Has the right experience	10	85	22
Has the best chance to win	48	50	11

== See also ==
- Democratic Party (United States) presidential primaries, 2008
- North Carolina Republican primary, 2008
