= 2008 North Carolina Republican presidential primary =

- May 6, 2008

69 pledged delegates to the Republican National Convention

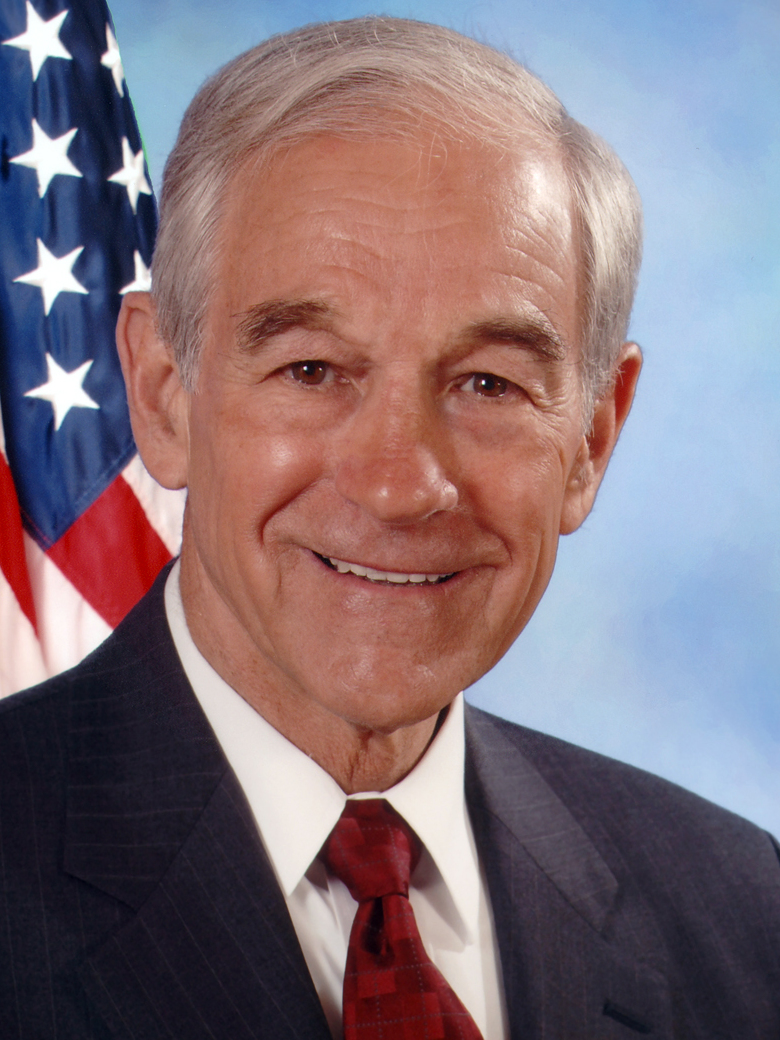

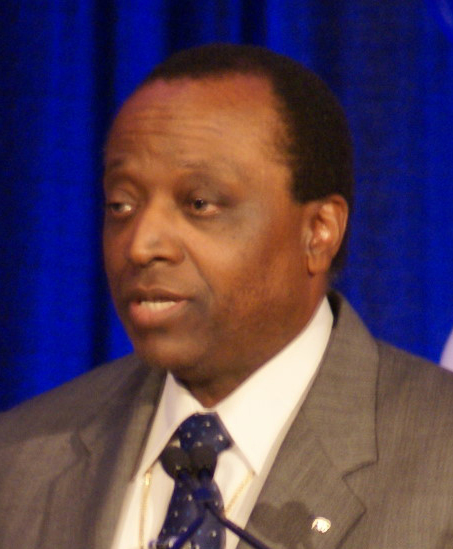
| Candidate | John McCain | Mike Huckabee (withdrawn) |
| Home state | Arizona | Arkansas |
| Delegate count | 51 | 8 |
| Popular vote | 383,085 | 63,018 |
| Percentage | 74.01% | 12.18% |
| Candidate | Ron Paul | Alan Keyes (withdrawn) |
| Home state | Texas | Maryland |
| Delegate count | 5 | 2 |
| Popular vote | 37,260 | 13,596 |
| Percentage | 7.20% | 2.63% |
- Election results by county. John McCain

The 2008 North Carolina Republican presidential primary took place on May 6, 2008 as part of the 2008 Republican Party presidential primaries. Moderate U.S. Senator and former presidential candidate John McCain would take the state after winning 74.01% of votes in the state and 51 delegates.

== Results ==
Official Results
| Candidate | Votes | Percentage | Delegates |
|---|---|---|---|
| John McCain | 383,085 | 74.01% | 51 |
| Mike Huckabee* | 63,018 | 12.18% | 8 |
| Ron Paul | 37,260 | 7.20% | 5 |
| Alan Keyes* | 13,596 | 2.63% | 2 |
| No Preference | 20,624 | 3.98% | 0 |
| Total | 517,583 | 100% | 66 |

* Candidate dropped out of the race before the primary

== See also ==
- North Carolina Democratic primary, 2008
- Republican Party (United States) presidential primaries, 2008
