= 2008 Indiana Republican presidential primary =

- May 6, 2008
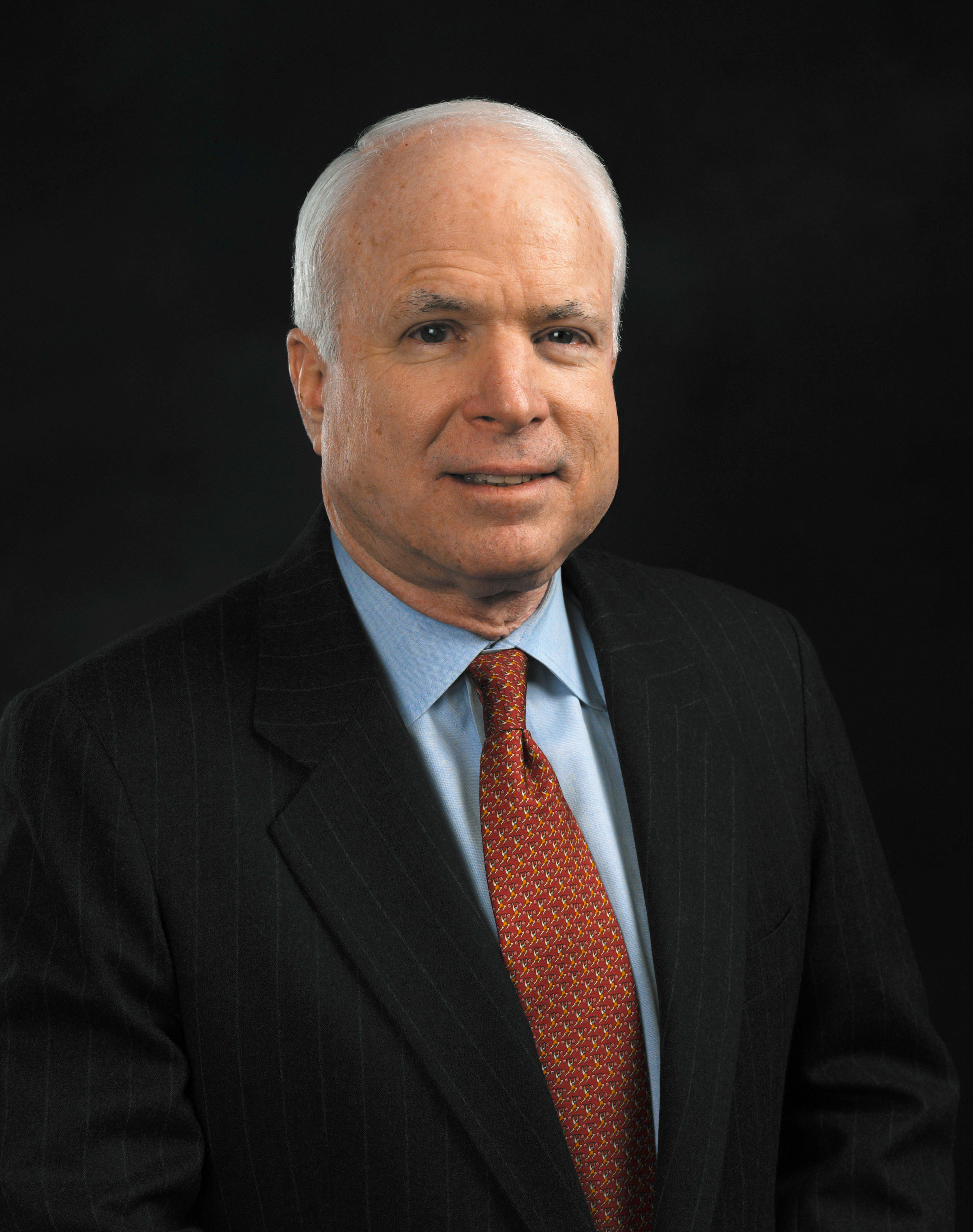

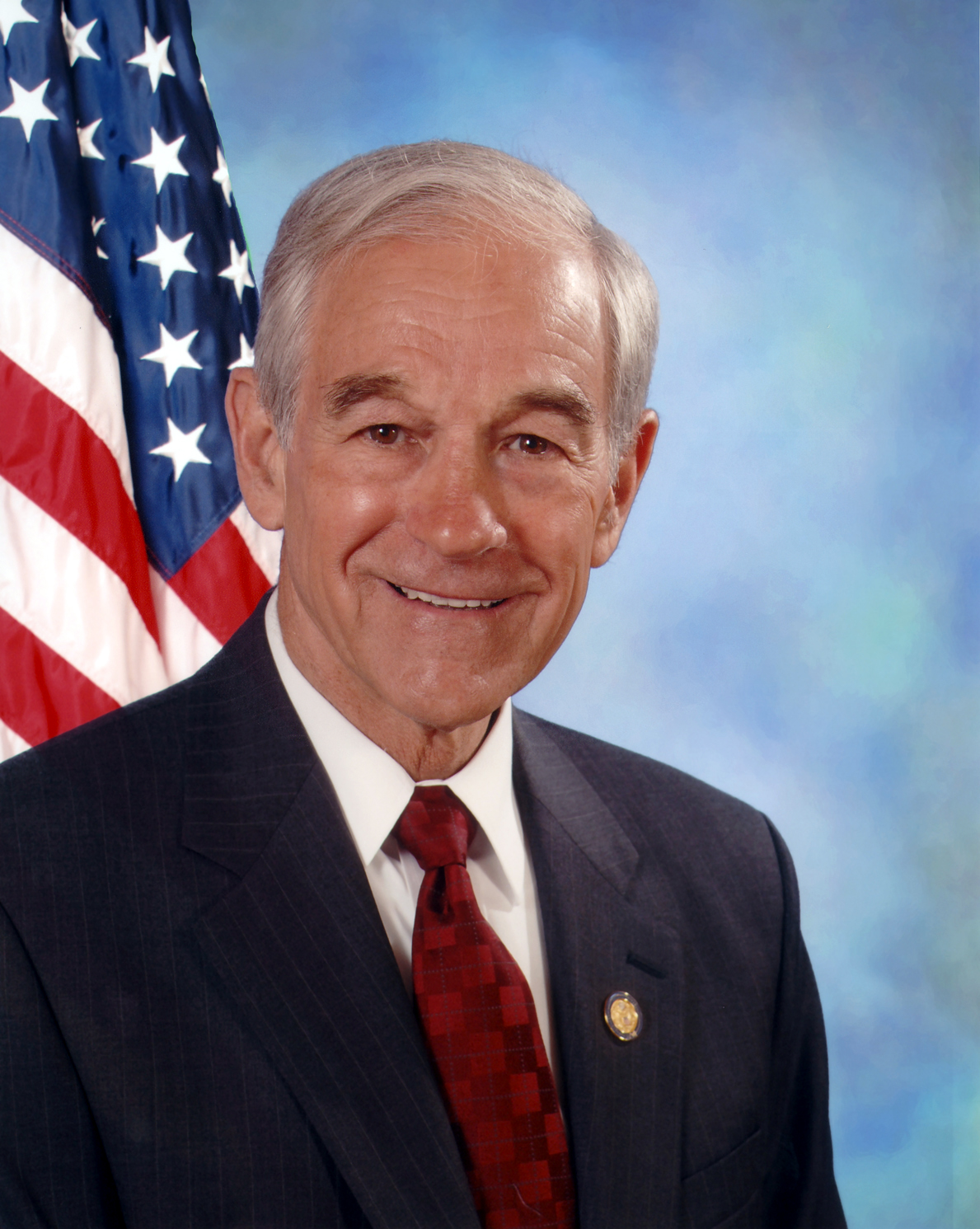

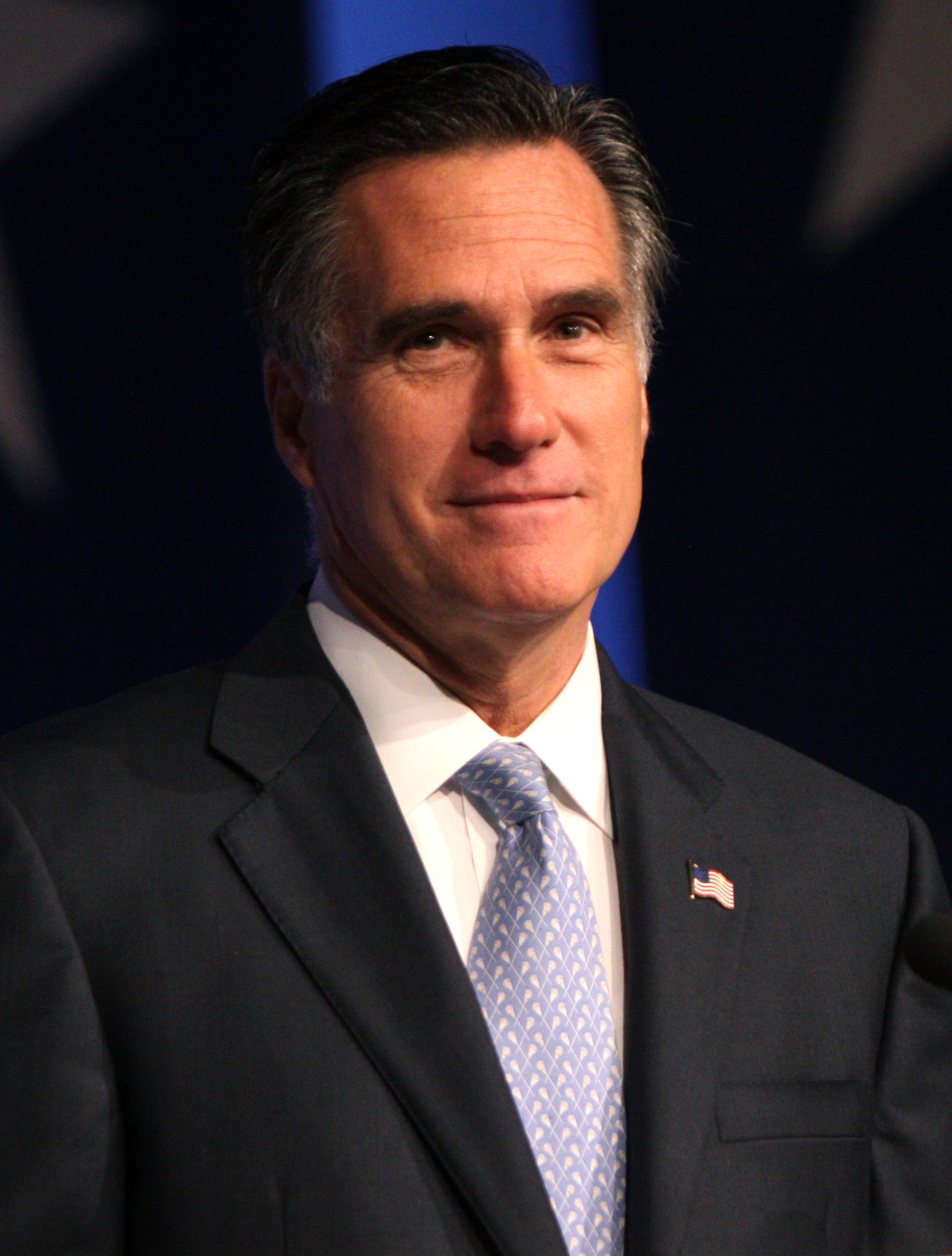
Candidate	John McCain	Mike Huckabee
Party	Republican	Republican
Home state	Arizona	Arkansas
Delegate count	27	0
Popular vote	320,290	41,171
Percentage	77.60%	9.97%
Candidate	Ron Paul	Mitt Romney
Party	Republican	Republican
Home state	Texas	Massachusetts
Delegate count	0	0
Popular vote	31,699	19,581
Percentage	7.68%	4.74%
- 2008 Indiana Republican primary county map. John McCain

The 2008 Indiana Republican presidential primary took place on May 6, 2008. 27 delegates to the 2008 Republican National Convention were selected in the election.

In addition, 27 other delegates were selected during the state convention from June 9 to June 10, 2008.

John McCain was the winner of the election and of all of Indiana's delegates.

== Polling ==
No polling was conducted in Indiana for the Republican primary because John McCain was the Republican Party's presumptive nominee.

== Campaigning ==
Unlike on the Democratic side, little campaigning took place as John McCain had already clinched the nomination. Ron Paul made only a few stops in the state, including Indiana University-Purdue University Fort Wayne a day before the primary.

== Results ==
Key:	Withdrew prior to contest

2008 Indiana Republican presidential primary 100% of districts reporting
Candidate	Votes	Percentage	Delegates
John McCain	320,318	77.62%	27
Mike Huckabee	41,173	9.98%	0
Ron Paul	31,612	7.66%	0
Mitt Romney	19,581	4.74%	0
Totals	412,684	100%	27

== See also ==
- 2008 Indiana Democratic presidential primary
- 2008 Republican Party presidential primaries
