= 2008 Delaware Republican presidential primary =

- February 5, 2008
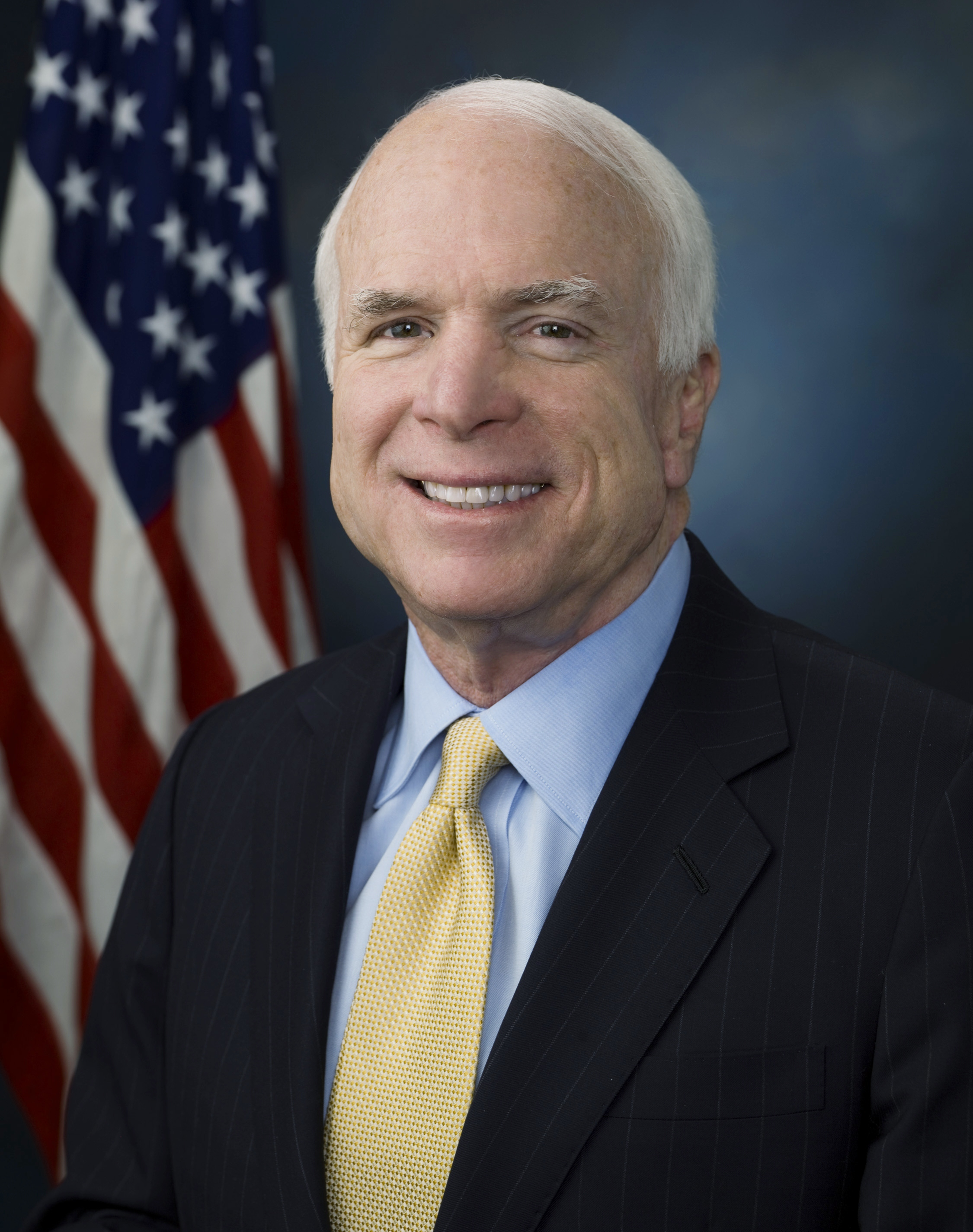

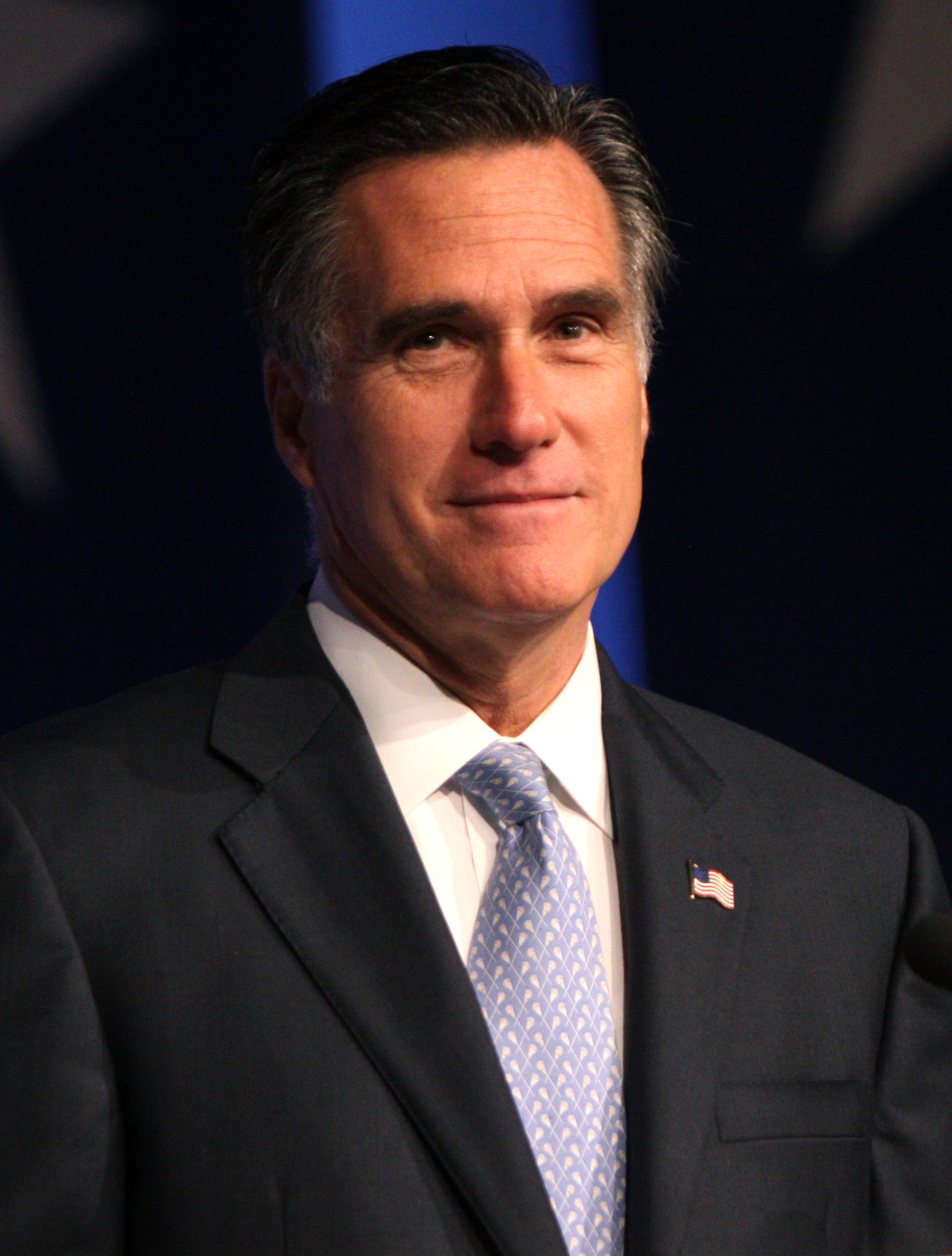

Nominee	John McCain	Mitt Romney	Mike Huckabee
Home state	Arizona	Massachusetts	Arkansas
Popular vote	22,628	16,344	7,706
Percentage	45.04%	32.53%	15.34%
- County results John McCain

The 2008 Delaware Republican presidential primary was held on February 5 (Super Tuesday). A total of 18 delegates were selected. The Delaware Republican Party rallied behind John McCain, and he was the declared winner of the primary election after successfully taking all three Delaware counties. McCain was followed by Mitt Romney in second and then by Mike Huckabee in third.

== Candidates ==
- Mike Huckabee
- John McCain
- Ron Paul
- Mitt Romney

Candidates Rudy Giuliani, Duncan Hunter, Fred Thompson, and Tom Tancredo had dropped out of the presidential race before the Delaware primary.

== Results ==
100% of precincts reporting
Candidate	Votes	Percentage	Delegates
John McCain	22,626	45.04%	18
Mitt Romney	16,344	32.53%	0
Mike Huckabee	7,706	15.34%	0
Ron Paul	2,131	4.24%	0
Rudy Giuliani*	1,255	2.5%	0
Tom Tancredo*	175	0.35%	0
Total	50,237	100%	18

*Candidate withdrew before primary

== Analysis ==
McCain was the expected favorite in the 2008 primary among the Republican candidates; his campaign was led by Delaware's only House representative, Rep. Michael N. Castle.

In Delaware, 27,412 of the 102,455 registered Republicans voted in the election, resulting in a 26.76% turn-out rate.

== Winners of Previous Primaries ==
- 2000: George W. Bush
- 1996: Steve Forbes

== See also ==
- 2004 Delaware Democratic presidential primary
- 2008 Republican Party presidential primaries
