= 2008 Indiana Democratic presidential primary =

- May 6, 2008

85 Democratic National Convention delegates (72 pledged, 13 unpledged)

Candidate	Hillary Clinton	Barack Obama
Home state	New York	Illinois
Delegate count	38	34
Popular vote	646,235	632,061
Percentage	50.56%	49.44%
- Primary results by county Clinton: 50–60% 60–70% 70–80% Obama: 50–60% 60–70%

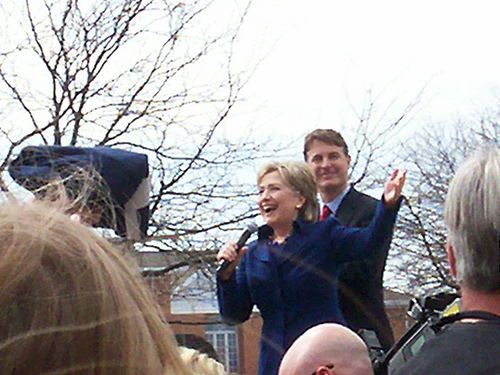
Hillary Clinton and Evan Bayh campaigning in Terre Haute, Indiana

The 2008 Indiana Democratic presidential primary took place on May 6, 2008. It was an open primary with 72 delegates at stake. The winner in each of Indiana's nine congressional districts was awarded all of that district's delegates, totaling 47. Another 25 delegates were awarded to the statewide winner, Hillary Clinton. The 72 delegates represented Indiana at the Democratic National Convention in Denver, Colorado. Twelve other unpledged delegates, known as superdelegates, also attended the convention and cast their votes.

Obama and Clinton were the only two candidates on the ballot in Indiana. Polls were opened in the state from 6 a.m. to 6 p.m., prevailing local time. (Most of the state is on Eastern Daylight Time (UTC-4), but 12 counties in the Evansville and Gary Metropolitan Areas are on Central Daylight Time (UTC-5).)

Clinton narrowly defeated Obama to win the primary.

== Polling ==
In the last polling conducted before the primary from May 4 to May 5, Obama led Clinton by a statistically insignificant 45-43 percent with 7 percent undecided in a 3.9-percent margin of error.

== Superdelegates ==
There were 13 superdelegates up for grabs, who were not bound by the primary results.

Indiana Superdelegates

Superdelegate	Position	Endorsement
Joe Andrew	Former DNC Chairman	Barack Obama, after switching from Hillary Rodham Clinton
Evan Bayh	Junior U.S. Senator from Indiana	Hillary Rodham Clinton
Cordelia Lewis Burks	Indiana Democratic Party Vice Chairwoman	Barack Obama
André Carson	U.S. Representative – IN-07	Barack Obama
Phoebe Crane	DNC Member	Hillary Rodham Clinton
Joe Donnelly	U.S. Representative – IN-02	Barack Obama
Brad Ellsworth	U.S. Representative – IN-08	Hillary Rodham Clinton
Baron Hill	U.S. Representative – IN-09	Barack Obama
Joe Hogsett	Former Indiana Secretary of State	Barack Obama
Dan Parker	Indiana Democratic Party Chairman	Hillary Rodham Clinton
Bob Pastrick	DNC Member	Hillary Rodham Clinton
Connie Thurman	DNC Member	Barack Obama
Peter Visclosky	U.S. Representative – IN-01	Barack Obama

== Results ==
Primary date: May 6, 2008

2008 Indiana Democratic presidential primary results
Party	Candidate	Votes	Percentage	Delegates
Democratic	Hillary Clinton	646,235	50.56%	38
Democratic	Barack Obama	632,061	49.44%	34
Totals		1,278,296	100.00%	72
Voter turnout		%		—

The day on which the Indiana primary occurred was known as Super Tuesday III. Along with North Carolina, which held its primary on the same day, this was largely considered the "Waterloo" of the Democratic primaries. Obama had been under fire for controversial remarks made by the Reverend Jeremiah Wright and was not initially expected to do well in Indiana, a state with similar demographics to Ohio and Pennsylvania, so pulling out a narrow loss was perceived as successful by the media. Further hurting Clinton's campaign was the time-zone difference; her double-digit defeat in North Carolina was reported in prime time, and the news of the slim victory in Indiana had come too late. MSNBC's Tim Russert said that Clinton "did not get the game-changer she wanted tonight" and "We now know who the Democratic nominee will be."

== Analysis ==
Hillary Rodham Clinton's narrow win in the Indiana Democratic primary can be traced to a number of factors. According to exit polls, 78 percent of voters in the Indiana Democratic Party were Caucasian and they opted for Clinton 60–40 percent compared to the 17 percent of voters who were African American who backed Obama by a margin of 89–11. Obama won young voters under the age of 40 by a margin of 59–41 while Clinton won older voters over the age of 40 by a margin of 58–42. The results varied according to socioeconomic class in Indiana. Obama won extremely poor voters with less than a $15,000 family income by a margin of 58–42. Clinton won middle class voters with family incomes of $15,000-$75,000 by a margin of 53–47. Obama won upper middle voters with a family income of $75,000-$100,000 by a margin of 51–49 while Clinton won more affluent voters with incomes of over $100,000 by a margin of 54–46 percent. Clinton won less educated voters (high school graduates backed her 54–46 while those with some college and/or an associate degree supported her 55–45) while Obama won more educated voters (college graduates and those with postgraduate studies both backed him 56–44). Clinton won self-identified Democrats, who made up 67 percent of the electorate, by a margin of 52–48 as well as self-identified Republicans, who made up 10 percent of the electorate, by a margin of 54–46; Obama won Independents, who made up 23 percent of the electorate, by a margin of 54–46. Obama won voters who identified themselves as liberal while Clinton won voters who said they were moderate and/or conservative. Regarding religion, Clinton won Protestants by a margin of 51–49 percent along with Roman Catholics by a margin of 61–39 percent; Obama won voters who identified with other religions by a margin of 60–40 as well as atheists/agnostics by a margin of 57–43.

Clinton performed well statewide through Indiana, winning most of the counties. Obama performed best in Marion County, which contains the state capital and heavily African American largest city of Indianapolis as well as the Indianapolis suburbs. He also won Northeast Indiana, which is anchored in Allen County by Fort Wayne. Clinton performed best in Southern Indiana along the Ohio River with neighboring Kentucky, as well as East Central Indiana and Northern Indiana, although the latter to a lesser extent. Obama also won Lake County in Northwest Indiana, which contains Gary and is a part of the Chicago Metropolitan Area, in addition to St. Joseph County, which contains South Bend and the University of Notre Dame. He also won Monroe County, containing the left-wing city of Bloomington, home to Indiana University. Clinton won Vanderburgh County, which contains Evansville, as well as Vigo County, which contains Terre Haute.

Obama's active campaigning in Indiana during the primary is widely believed to be a cause of his narrow win in this heavily Republican state in the 2008 general election against John McCain.

== Charges of election fraud ==
On April 3, 2012, four St. Joseph County Democratic officials had charges filed against them for allegedly forging Barack Obama and Hillary Clinton primary petitions during the 2008 election. Authorities charged that the scheme to submit the fake petitions for Obama was put together at the local county Democratic headquarters.

Under state law, presidential candidates need to qualify with 500 signatures from each of Indiana's nine congressional districts. Indiana elections officials said that in St. Joseph County, which is the 2nd Congressional District, the Obama campaign qualified with 534 signatures; Clinton's camp had 704. The signatures, which were certified by the elections board, were never challenged. If the number of legitimate signatures for Obama or Clinton had been challenged and had fallen below the legal requirement of 500, they could have been removed from the state ballot. Reports previously put the number of phony signatures for both candidates at about 150, but state investigators plucked names from the petitions at random and cited only 20 individual alleged forgeries as part of their case.

Two officials, former St. Joseph County Democratic party Chairman Butch Morgan Jr. and former county Board of Elections worker Dustin Blythe, were both found guilty of various felonies associated with their faking petitions that enabled Obama to get on the presidential primary ballot in 2008.

== See also ==
- 2008 Democratic Party presidential primaries
- 2008 Indiana Republican presidential primary
