= 2008 Louisiana Republican presidential caucuses and primary =

- January 22 and February 9, 2008

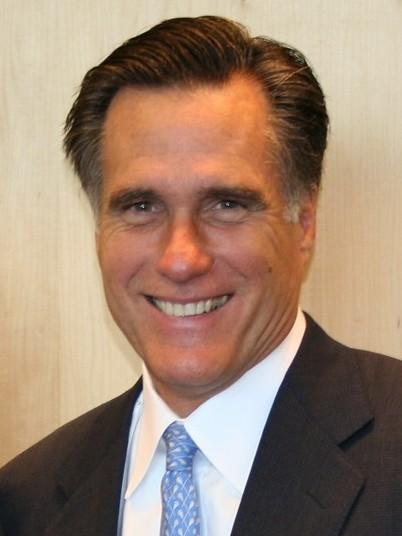

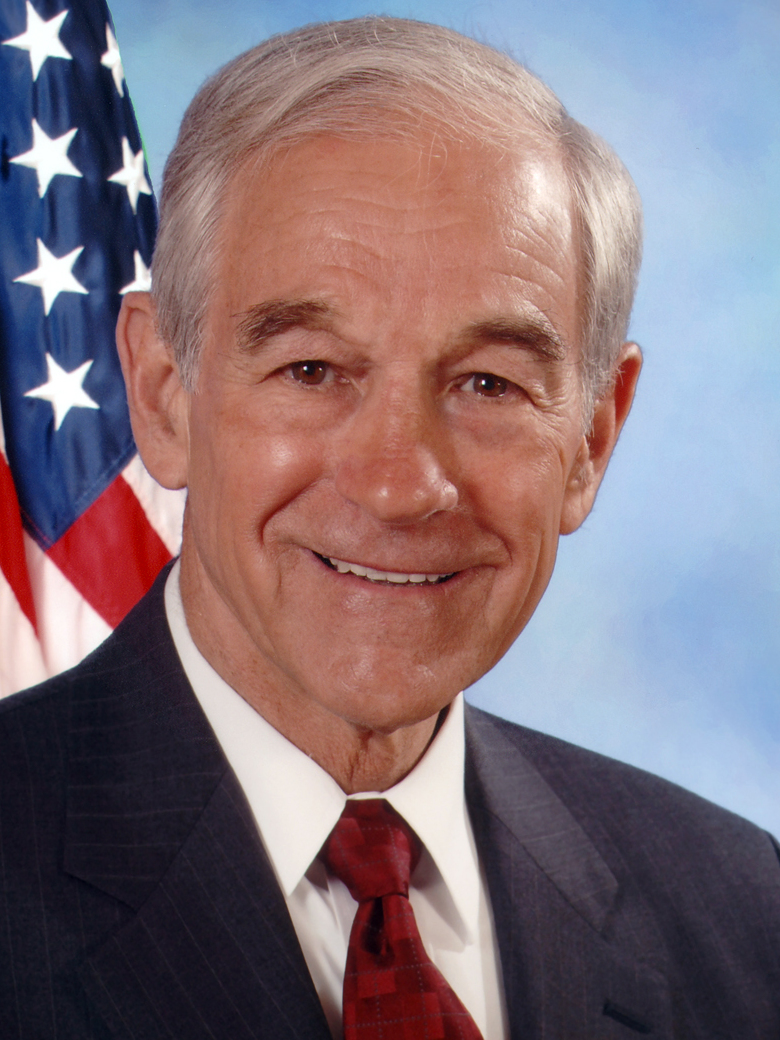
Candidate	Mike Huckabee	John McCain
Home state	Arkansas	Arizona
Delegate count	0	0
Popular vote	69,594	67,551
Percentage	43.18%	41.91%
Candidate	Mitt Romney	Ron Paul
Home state	Massachusetts	Texas
Delegate count	0	0
Popular vote	10,222	8,590
Percentage	6.34%	5.33%
- Parish results Mike Huckabee John McCain

The 2008 Louisiana Republican presidential caucuses were held on January 22 and the primary on February 9, 2008.

== Background ==
On December 19, 2007, the Republican Party of Louisiana announced the procedures for selection of its delegates to the 2008 Republican National Convention.

The Louisiana caucuses selected 105 delegates to the state convention on February 16 in Baton Rouge. Fifteen delegates (and 15 alternates) from each of the seven congressional districts were elected at the caucus sites. Eligibility to participate was originally restricted to those who had been registered Louisiana Republicans since November 30, 2007 and presented a photo identification, however the restriction date was changed to November 1, 2007, at the last minute. Voters were to select up to 15 candidates on a secret ballot.

Twenty-one delegates to the 2008 RNC will be selected through the caucus process, since each district's 15 delegates to the state convention will separately select three RNC delegates and three alternates for their respective district. In addition, the state convention delegates, as a whole, will select 20 delegates and 20 alternates to the national convention as at-large delegates. Under state party rules, if there is a majority in the February 9 Louisiana primary, these 20 delegates are pledged to vote for the winner. Otherwise, these 20 will officially go to the convention uncommitted. The remaining six members of the RNC delegation are chosen as follows: The Louisiana GOP chair and the two Louisiana representatives on the Republican National Committee ("party delegates") have automatic spots as 2008 RNC delegates, and the other three delegates will be selected by the executive committee of the Louisiana Republican State Central Committee.

Unlike other Republican caucuses, which feature a straw poll (or presidential preference election) prior to the election of delegates to the state convention, no preference election was conducted. All delegates elected at the caucus are "uncommitted" and considered unallocated to any candidate. However, many campaigns will distribute lists of delegates who will vote for their preferred presidential candidate. Delegates can be any Republican who has submitted the necessary paperwork and paid the $100 fee ($50 for alternate delegate). By setting up the caucus in this non-binding way, it allows Louisiana to avoid the delegate penalties that have befallen Michigan, New Hampshire, and South Carolina.

== Caucuses ==
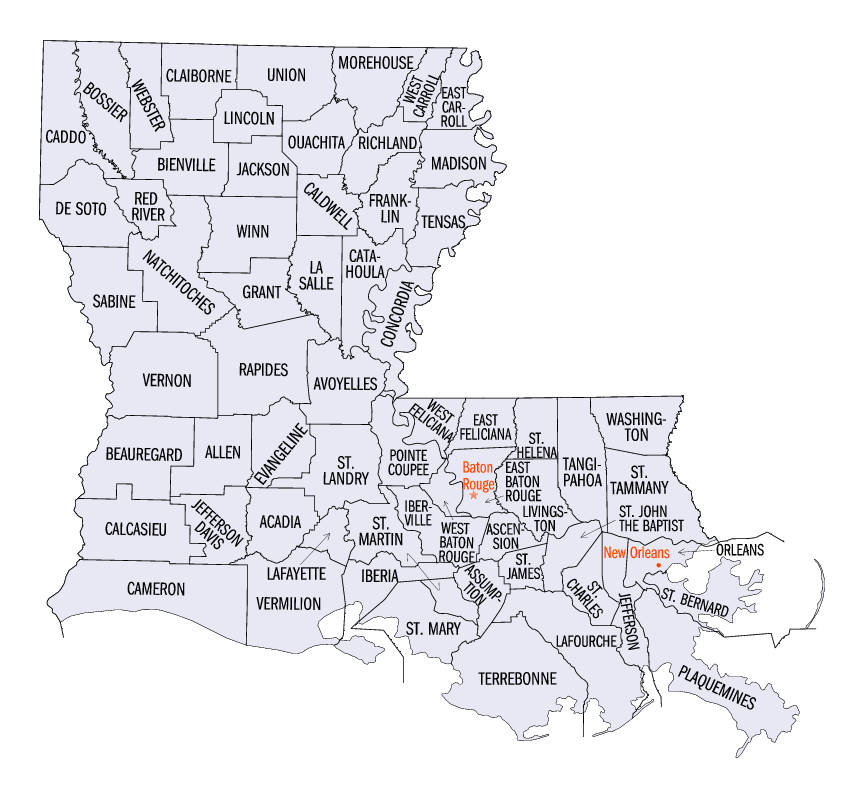

Unofficial delegate assignment results of the January 22 caucuses had been made available on the homepage of the Republican Party of Louisiana. The official results have been released, but the results only indicate which delegates garnered the most votes, and fail to match the delegates with the candidate they support. Preliminary results show John McCain winning the most committed delegates, followed by Ron Paul in second place, and Mitt Romney in third. Ron Paul's campaign is challenging the caucus, citing multiple errors in the process, significant irregularities including the decision by the Louisiana GOP to waive the original deadline which saw Ron Paul leading in delegates pledged to him, and extending the deadline after the fact in order to give other candidates two more days to file delegates.

=== Locations ===
Republicans were assigned to one of 11 locations in the state to caucus in.

The locations were:

Location	Venue	Parishes
Bossier City	CenturyTel Center	Caddo, Bossier, Webster, Claiborne, Bienville, De Soto, Red River
West Monroe	West Monroe Convention Center	Union, Morehouse, West Carroll, East Carroll, Madison, Tensas, Franklin, Caldwell, Jackson, Lincoln, Ouachita, Richland
Pineville	Walden Gym at Louisiana College	Rapides, Vernon, Avoyelles, Concordia, Catahoula, La Salle, Grant
Lake Charles	Central School Arts and Humanities Center	Beauregard, Allen, Jefferson Davis, Calcasieu, Cameron
Lafayette	Family Life Church	Evangeline, St. Landry, Vermillion, Acadia, Lafayette, St. Martin, Iberia
Baton Rouge	Jefferson Baptist Church	St. Helena, Livingston, West Feliciana, East Feliciana, Pointe Coupee, East Baton Rouge, West Baton Rouge, Iberville, Ascension
Kenner	Pontchartrain Center	Jefferson, St. Charles, St. John the Baptist, St. James
New Orleans	Morial Convention Center	Orleans, St. Bernard, Plaquemines
Covington	Holiday Inn	St. Tammany, Washington, Tangiphoa
Houma	Houma Municipal Auditorium	Terrebonne, Lafourche, Assumption, St. Mary
Natchitoches	Natchitoches Events Center	Sabine, Natchitoches, Winn

=== Campaign ===
The Louisiana caucus has not been well noticed by the media. Many media outlets outside the state focus on the February 9 primary, although that primary will select 20 delegates at most to the national convention.

According to the state party, only Mitt Romney, John McCain, and Fred Thompson were campaigning in the state as of December 2007, although Ron Paul will visit the state the day before the caucus. Turnout was expected to be low due to the limited number of sites. Commentators have criticized the state party for the confusing system, which has admitted that the caucus is designed "for people who are politically active... not just casual voters" and that the February 9 primary is just a "beauty contest".

The slate gaining the highest votes was a "pro-family, pro-life" slate which used the image of former President Ronald Reagan to advocate candidate who supported reduced government and a strong national defense.

=== Results ===
Ron Paul had the greatest number of delegates by the January 10 deadline, which was then extended to January 12. Ron Paul's campaign is challenging mistakes it claims were made by the Louisiana GOP, including the wrongful issuance of provisional ballots to hundreds of voters, in numbers sufficient to alter the outcome. According to a state Republican Party press release regarding the preliminary results, the order of placement of slates was Uncommitted Pro-Life, McCain, Paul, Romney, others. Note that candidates could run on more than one slate. Many of the Uncommitted Pro-Life delegates have since committed to McCain. In addition, after a recount of delegates, the provisional ballots were found not to have changed the results, with about two-thirds of the provisional ballots being cast by members of other parties.

On February 1, 2008, state party chairman Roger F. Villere, Jr., congratulated the McCain campaign via e-mail for winning a majority of the delegates statewide, including receiving a majority of delegates in Congressional Districts 1, 2, 3, 6, and 7. In addition, the party executive committee and the three Louisiana superdelegates have also committed to McCain, thus giving McCain 41 delegates from Louisiana, 35 of which are from the caucus process. This assumes that no other candidate will receive more than 50% in the February 9 primary.

== Primary ==
Under Louisiana Republican Party rules, since no candidate received a majority of the vote, no delegates are pledged as a result of this primary. 21 delegates have already indirectly been assigned via the Louisiana Republican caucus held on January 22. The 20 delegates elected at the state convention were formally unpledged, although an estimated 41 of Louisiana's 47 delegates were going to support John McCain, and the state party chair congratulated McCain on winning those 41 delegates, before the primary was held.

Official Results
Candidate	Votes	Percentage	Delegates
Mike Huckabee	69,594	43.18%	0
John McCain	67,551	41.91%	0
Mitt Romney*	10,222	6.34%	0
Ron Paul	8,590	5.33%	0
Fred Thompson*	1,603	0.99%	0
Rudy Giuliani*	1.593	0.99%	0
Alan Keyes	837	0.52%	0
Jerry Curry	521	0.32%	0
Daniel Gilbert	183	0.11%	0
Tom Tancredo*	107	0.07%	0
Duncan Hunter*	368	0.23%	0
Total	156,101	100%	0

* Candidate dropped out of the race before the primary

== Convention ==
At the state convention, held February 16, the Associated Press identified 32 McCain delegates from the caucus process, with three uncommitted and nine unavailable for comment. The AP also confirmed that the three party delegates support McCain, giving him 35 delegates from Louisiana.

== See also ==
- 2008 Louisiana Democratic presidential primary
- 2008 Republican Party presidential primaries
