= 2008 Tennessee Republican presidential primary =

- February 5, 2008

52 Republican National Convention delegates
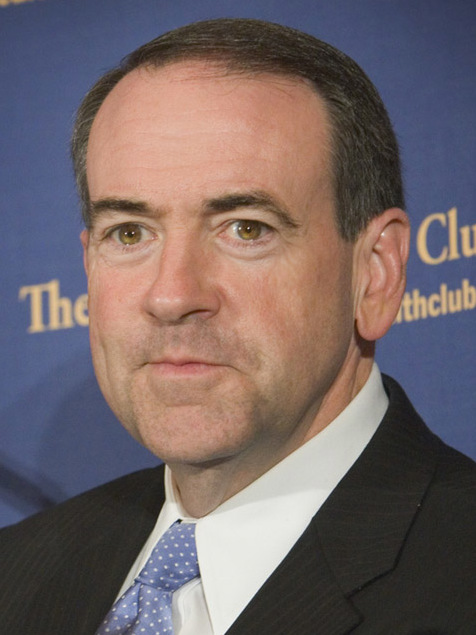

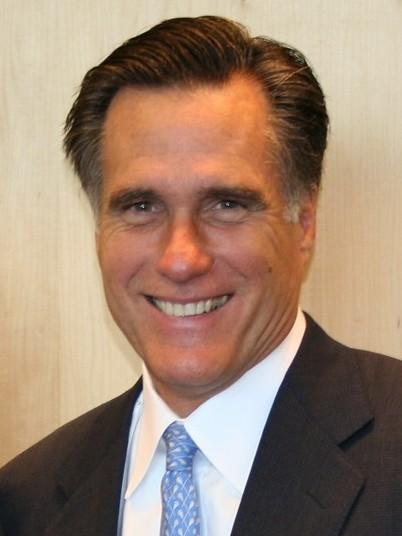

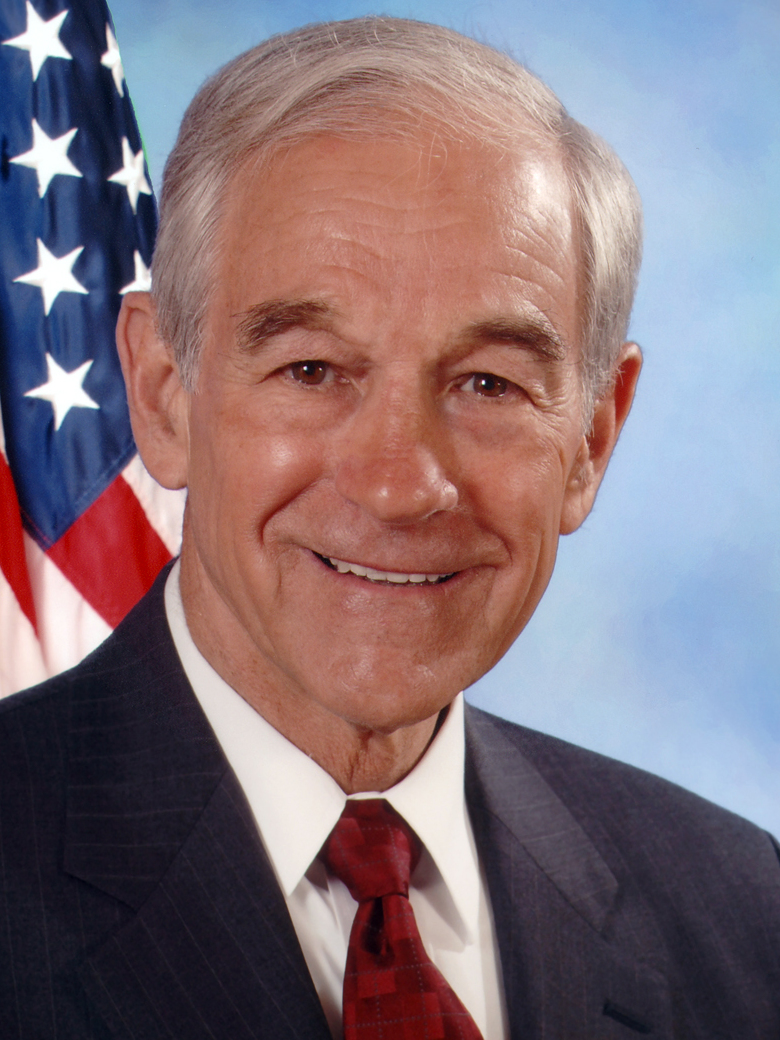
Candidate	Mike Huckabee	John McCain
Home state	Arkansas	Arizona
Delegate count	25	19
Popular vote	190,904	176,091
Percentage	34.37%	31.84%
Candidate	Mitt Romney	Ron Paul
Home state	Massachusetts	Texas
Delegate count	8	0
Popular vote	130,632	31,026
Percentage	23.62%	5.61%

Huckabee
McCain
Romney
Huckabee
30 – 40%
40 – 50%
50 – 60%
McCain
30 – 40%
40 – 50%
Romney
30 – 40%

The 2008 Tennessee Republican presidential primary took place on February 5, 2008 (Super Tuesday), with 52 national delegates. Mike Huckabee narrowly defeated John McCain to win the largest share of Tennessee's delegates to the 2008 Republican National Convention. Both McCain and the third-place candidate Mitt Romney received delegates along with Huckabee.

At 10:15 PM ET on February 5, the Associated Press reported that with 44% of precincts reporting Huckabee and McCain were tied with about one-third of the vote each. Earlier, with 31% of precincts in, McCain had 34% support, Huckabee 31%, Romney 23% and Paul 6% support.

The City Paper reported that voter turnout could beat the state's record of 830,000 in 1988 when Al Gore was on the presidential ballot for the first time.

AP exit polls showed that Huckabee did well with born-again Christians and conservatives.

== Results ==
100% of precincts reporting
Candidate	Votes	Percentage	Delegates
Mike Huckabee	190,904	34.37%	25
John McCain	176,091	31.84%	19
Mitt Romney	130,632	23.62%	8
Ron Paul	31,026	5.61%	0
Fred Thompson*	16,263	2.94%	0
Rudy Giuliani*	5,159	0.93%	0
Alan Keyes	978	0.18%	0
Duncan Hunter*	738	0.13%	0
Tom Tancredo*	194	0.03%	0
Uncommitted	1,830	0.33%	0
Total	553,005	100.00%	52

* Candidate dropped out of the race before the primary

== See also ==
- 2008 Republican Party presidential primaries
- 2008 Tennessee Democratic presidential primary
- 2008 United States presidential election in Tennessee
- 2008 Tennessee elections
