= 2008 Maryland Republican presidential primary =

- February 12, 2008

Candidate	John McCain	Mike Huckabee
Party	Republican	Republican
Home state	Arizona	Arkansas
Delegate count	37	0
Popular vote	176,046	91,608
Percentage	54.84%	28.54%
- Election results by county. John McCain

The 2008 Maryland Republican presidential primary took place on February 12, 2008. The state sent 37 delegates to the 2008 Republican National Convention in St. Paul, Minnesota. Three delegates were awarded to the winner of each of the state's eight congressional districts; the remainder of the state's delegates were at-large. John McCain won the primary election.

In opinion polling conducted on February 7 and 8, John McCain was the heavy favorite among Maryland's Republican voters. 56% of respondents supported him, 17% Mike Huckabee, 10% Ron Paul, with the rest scattered or undecided.

The District of Columbia and State of Virginia held their primaries on the same date, leading the day to be dubbed the "Potomac primary" by many pundits, after the river that borders all three jurisdictions.

== Results ==
100% of precincts reporting
Candidate	Votes	Percentage	Delegates
John McCain	176,046	54.84%	37
Mike Huckabee	91,608	28.54%	0
Mitt Romney*	21,426	6.99%	0
Ron Paul	19,196	5.98%	0
Rudy Giuliani*	4,548	1.42%	0
Alan Keyes	3,386	1.05%	0
Fred Thompson*	2,901	0.90%	0
Duncan Hunter*	522	0.16%	0
Tom Tancredo*	356	0.11%	0
Total	320,989	100%	37

*Candidate suspended campaign prior to this primary

== See also ==
- 2008 Maryland Democratic presidential primary
- 2008 Republican Party presidential primaries
