= 2008 Florida Republican presidential primary =

- January 29, 2008

57 pledged delegates to the Republican National Convention All delegates are awarded to the candidate receiving the most votes

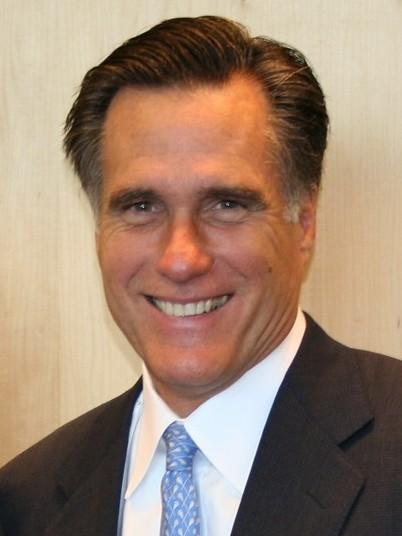

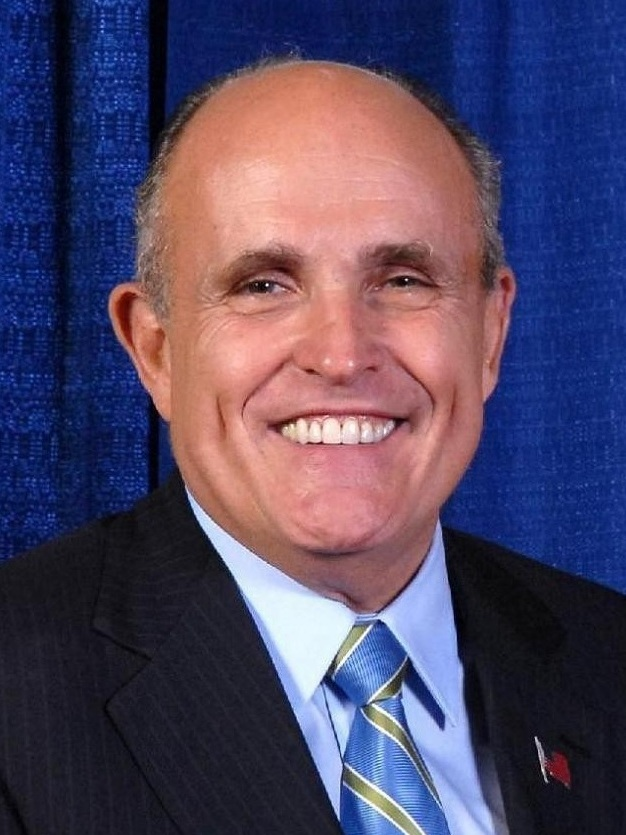

Candidate	John McCain	Mitt Romney
Home state	Arizona	Massachusetts
Delegate count	57	0
Popular vote	701,761	604,932
Percentage	36.00%	31.03%
Candidate	Rudy Giuliani	Mike Huckabee
Home state	New York	Arkansas
Delegate count	0	0
Popular vote	286,089	262,681
Percentage	14.68%	13.47%
- County results John McCain Mitt Romney Mike Huckabee

The 2008 Florida Republican presidential primary was held on January 29, 2008, with 57 delegates at stake on a winner-take-all basis. The Republican National Committee removed half of Florida's delegates because the state committee moved its Republican primary before February 5.

Arizona Senator and eventual nominee John McCain won the primary with 36% of the vote. As a presidential candidate, former New York City mayor Rudy Giuliani concentrated heavily on the Florida primary. After coming in third place behind McCain and former Massachusetts Governor Mitt Romney, Giuliani dropped out of the race the following day. McCain's win helped him cement his status as the Republican primary frontrunner.

== Campaign ==
Rudy Giuliani campaigned quite heavily in Florida, which he expected to use as his "launch pad" for a "strong showing" on Super Tuesday. He campaigned almost entirely in Florida, and largely ignored South Carolina and other states voting before February 5.

Giuliani had been campaigning with virtually no opposition; however, following the South Carolina Republican primary, 2008, several candidates flew down to Florida to begin campaigning up to January 29 when the primary occurred.

Polls taken before the primary showed that John McCain was the slight front runner over Mitt Romney. McCain received pivotal endorsements from Florida Governor Charlie Crist and Florida Senator Mel Martínez days before the primary.

== Pre-primary polls ==
As of January 29, RealClearPolitics reported that the average support from polls taken in the days immediately prior to primary day placed McCain slightly in the lead with 30.7%, followed by Romney with 30.1%, Giuliani with 14.7%, Huckabee with 12.9%, and Paul with 3.6%. Former Senator Fred Thompson and Representative Duncan Hunter, though already out of the race, still remained on the ballot in the Florida primary.

== Results ==
On January 29, 2008, McCain prevailed in Florida's Republican presidential primary. McCain's victory in the state was credited to his victories in Miami-Dade, Broward and Palm Beach counties, which Giuliani had been expected to perform well in.

Candidate	Votes	Percentage	Counties	Delegates
John McCain	701,761	36%	45	57
Mitt Romney	604,932	31.03%	18	0
Rudy Giuliani	286,089	14.68%	0	0
Mike Huckabee	262,681	13.47%	4	0
Ron Paul	62,887	3.23%	0	0
Fred Thompson*	22,668	1.16%	0	0
Alan Keyes	4,060	0.21%	0	0
Duncan Hunter*	2,847	0.15%	0	0
Tom Tancredo*	1,573	0.08%	0	0
Totals	1,949,498	100%	67	57

* Candidate dropped out of the race prior to primary.

== See also ==
- 2008 Florida Democratic presidential primary
- 2008 Republican Party presidential primaries
- 2008 United States presidential election in Florida
