= 2008 Illinois Republican presidential primary =

- February 5, 2008

70 delegates to the Republican National Convention (57 pledged, 13 unpledged)

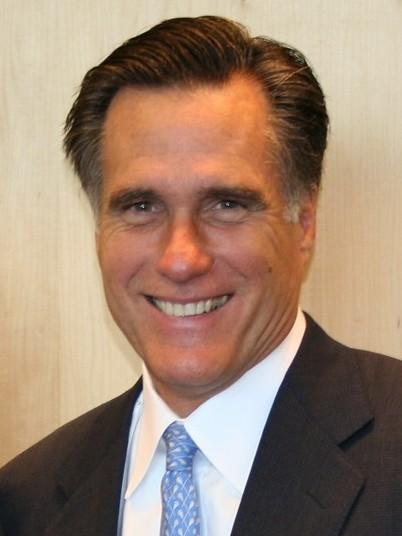

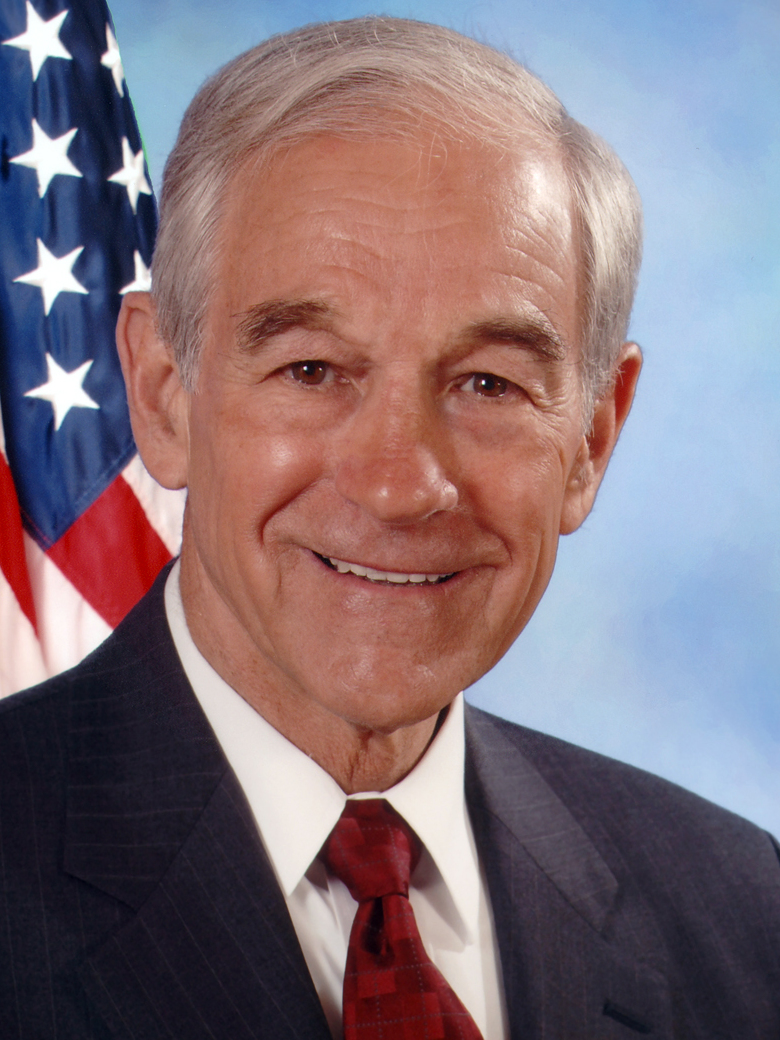
Candidate	John McCain	Mitt Romney
Home state	Arizona	Massachusetts
Delegate count	54	3
Popular vote	426,777	257,265
Percentage	47.45%	28.60%
Candidate	Mike Huckabee	Ron Paul
Home state	Arkansas	Texas
Delegate count	0	0
Popular vote	148,053	45,055
Percentage	16.46%	5.01%
- Election results by county. John McCain Mitt Romney Mike Huckabee

The 2008 Illinois Republican presidential primary was held on February 5, 2008. Illinois was one of 24 States holding a primary or caucus on Super Tuesday, 2008. Delegates from each of Illinois' 19 congressional districts are selected by direct election. In addition, the primary ballot also contains a preference poll that lists the presidential candidates. 10 at-large delegates and 3 party leader delegates were elected at the State Convention and officially went to the Republican Convention unpledged.

== Results ==
Official Results
Candidate	Votes	Percentage	Delegates
John McCain	426,777	47.45%	54
Mitt Romney	257,265	28.60%	3
Mike Huckabee	148,053	16.46%	0
Ron Paul	45,055	5.01%	0
Rudy Giuliani*	11,837	1.32%	0
Fred Thompson*	7,259	0.81%	0
Alan Keyes	2,318	0.26%	0
Jim Mitchell, Jr.	483	0.05%	0
Tom Tancredo*	375	0.04%	0
Total	899,422	100%	57

*Candidate withdrew prior to the primary

== See also ==
- 2008 Illinois Democratic presidential primary
- 2008 United States presidential election in Illinois
- 2008 Republican Party presidential primaries
