= 2008 Iowa Republican presidential caucuses =

- January 3, 2008

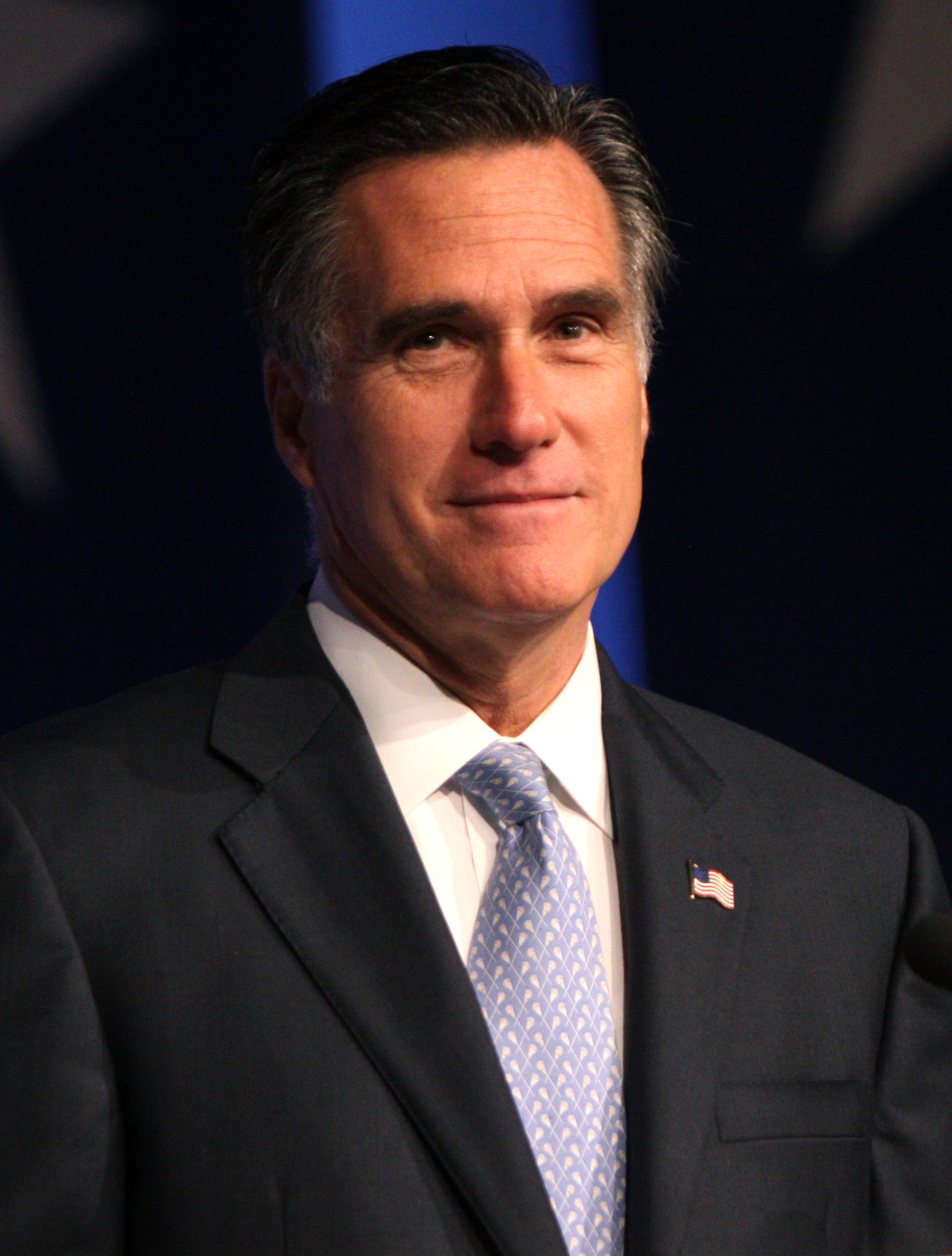

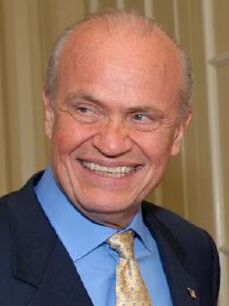

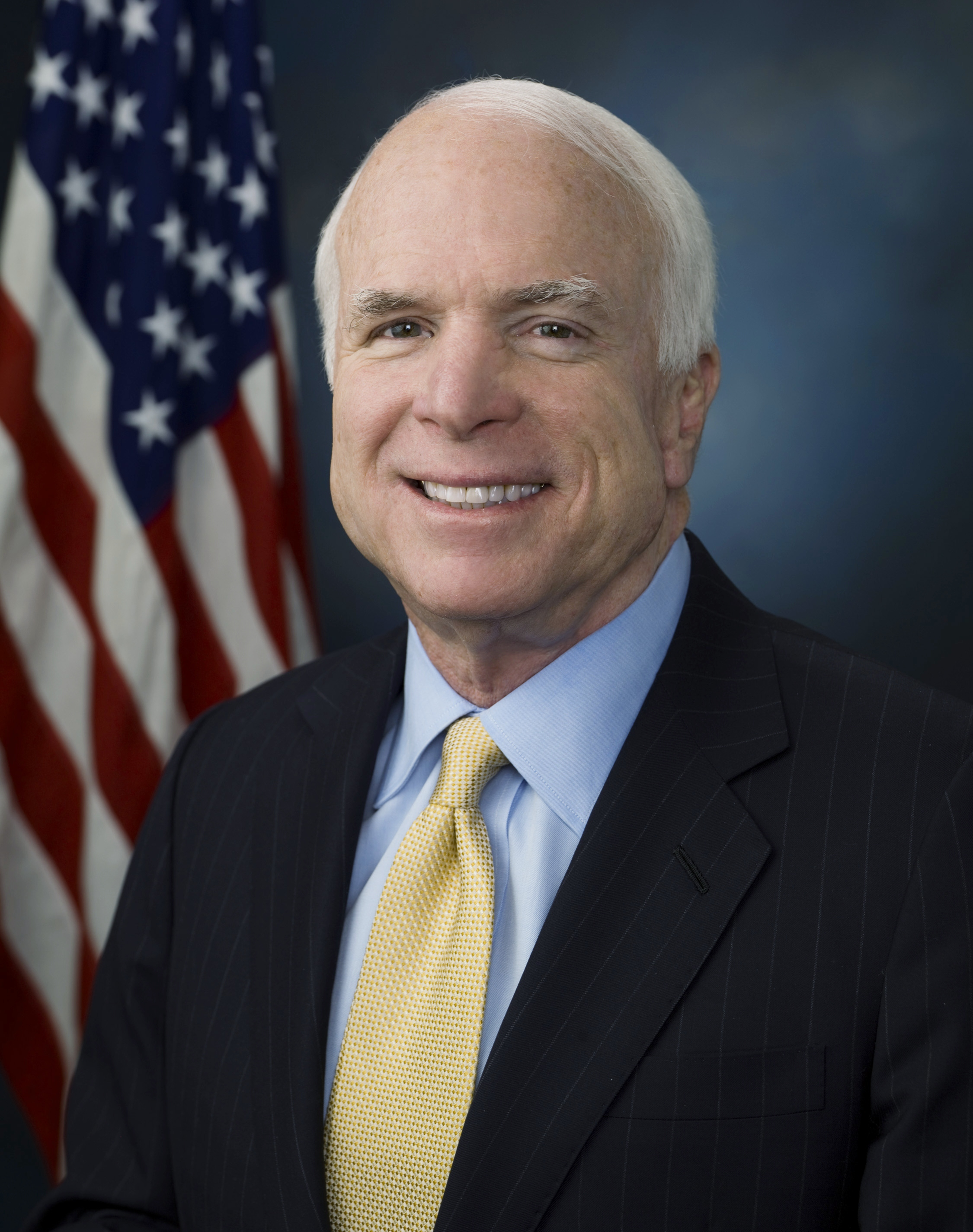

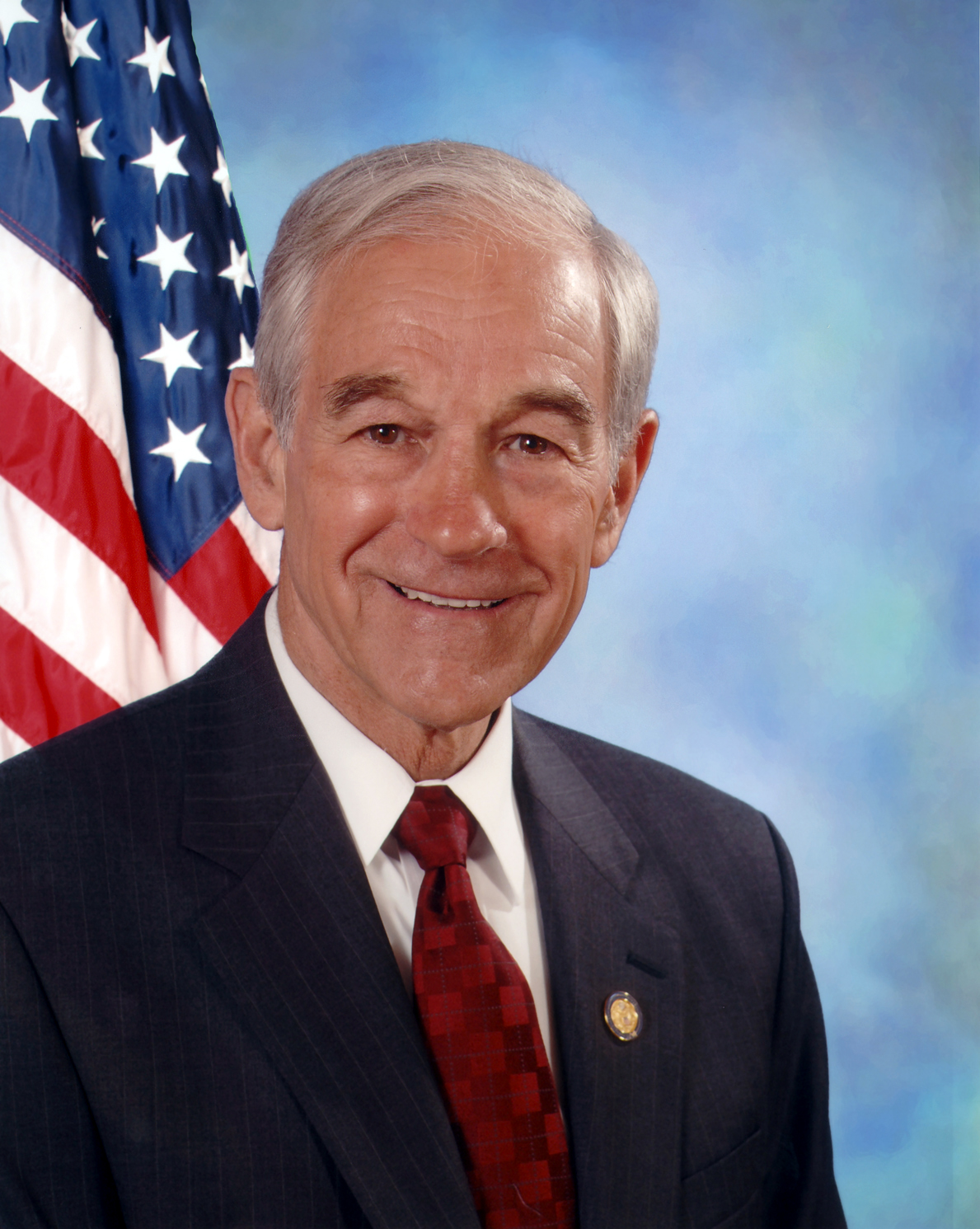

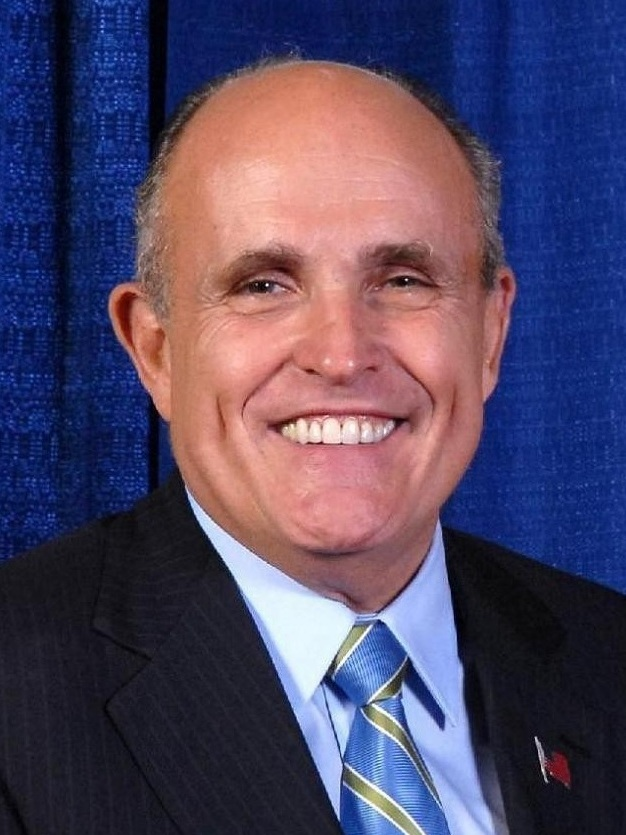
Nominee	Mike Huckabee	Mitt Romney	Fred Thompson
Party	Republican	Republican	Republican
Home state	Arkansas	Massachusetts	Tennessee
Popular vote	40,954	30,021	15,960
Percentage	34.36%	25.19%	13.39%
Nominee	John McCain	Ron Paul	Rudy Giuliani
Party	Republican	Republican	Republican
Home state	Arizona	Texas	New York
Popular vote	15,536	11,841	4,099
Percentage	13.03%	9.93%	3.44%
- Election results by county. Mike Huckabee Mitt Romney Ron Paul

The 2008 Iowa Republican presidential caucuses took place on January 3, 2008. The Iowa Republican caucuses are an unofficial primary, with the delegates to the state convention selected proportionally via a straw poll. The Iowa caucuses mark the traditional formal start of the delegate selection process for the 2008 United States presidential election.

Prior to the 2008 caucuses, as in previous election cycles with a competitive presidential race, an unofficial Ames Straw Poll was held, on August 11, 2007. The official one, electing delegates to the state convention, was held on January 3, 2008, the same day as the Democratic contest. In the Ames Straw Poll, Mitt Romney finished first with 32% of the vote. In the January 2008 caucuses, Mike Huckabee finished first with 34% of the vote.

Huckabee's victory in the caucus was credited to his strong performance among evangelical voters, with an exit poll finding that 80% of his voters were evangelicals. Huckabee's victory over his nearest opponent Romney, who outspent him by millions in the state, was considered significant by media outlets.

== January 2008 procedure ==
Unlike the Democratic caucus, the Republican Party does not use voting rounds or have minimum requirements for a percent of votes. The Republican version is done with a straw vote of those attending the caucus. This vote is sometimes done by a show of hands or by dividing themselves into groups according to candidate. However, officially it is done with voters receiving a blank piece of paper with no names on it, and the voter writing a name and placing it in a ballot box.

Following the straw poll, delegates are then elected from the remaining participants in the room, as most voters leave once their vote is cast. All delegates are officially considered unbound, but media outlets either apportion delegates proportionally or apportion them in terms of winner-take-all by counties. In precincts that elect only one delegate, the delegate is chosen by majority vote and the vote must be by paper ballot. The state party strongly urges that delegates reflect the results of the preference poll, but there is no obligation that they do so.

== The Ames Straw Poll ==
The 2007 Ames straw poll was held at Iowa State University (Ames)'s Hilton Coliseum on August 11, 2007. This was primarily a fundraising event for the state's Republican Party, and only Iowa residents who paid the $35 price for a ticket were eligible to vote. Tickets were available through the various presidential campaigns and the Iowa Republican Party's headquarters.

In general, the candidates bought large blocks of tickets and gave them out for free to whoever agreed to go and vote for that candidate. The candidates also rented buses to transport voters to Ames.

Mitt Romney finished first with 32% of the vote, followed by Mike Huckabee (18%), Sam Brownback (15%), Tom Tancredo (14%), and Ron Paul (10%). Six other candidates shared the remaining 14% of the vote.

== Pre-caucus polls ==
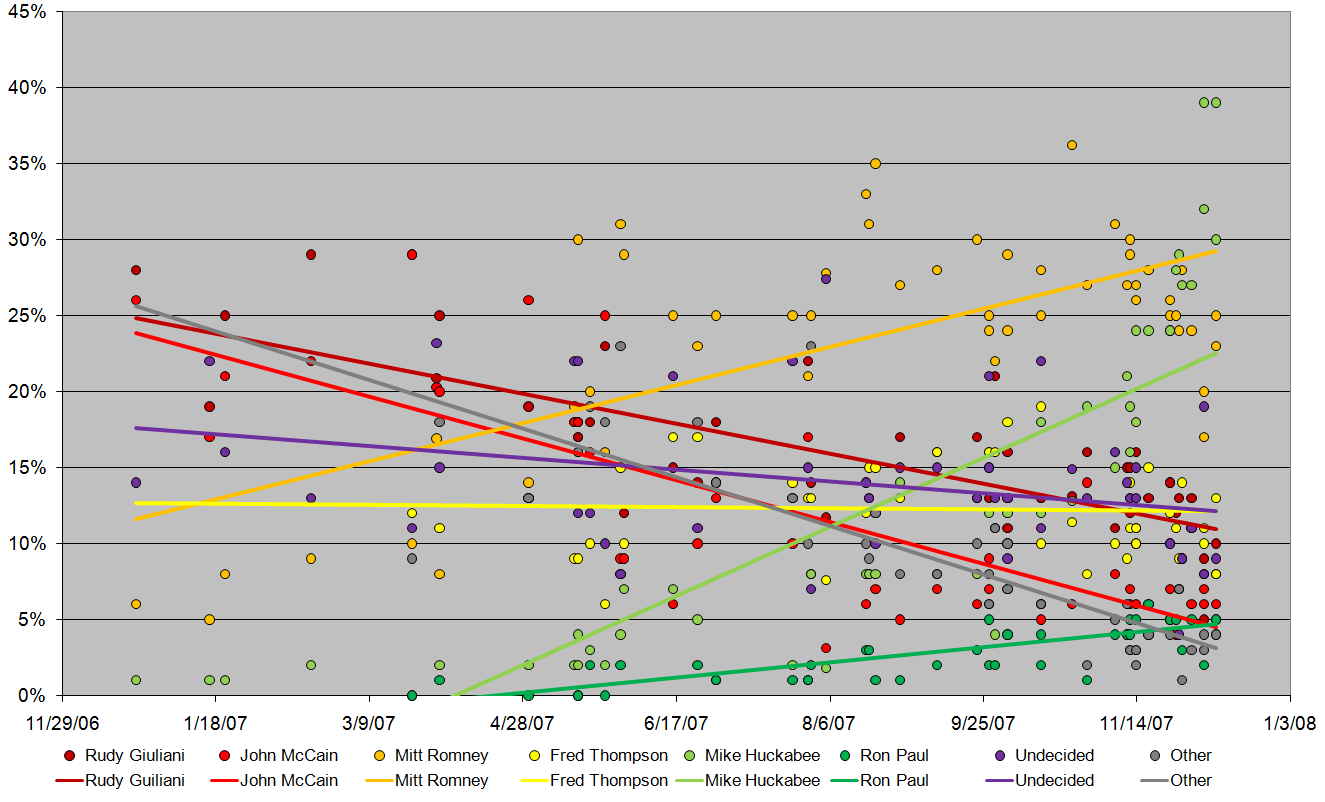
Pre-caucus opinion polling statistics throughout the campaign season.

Before the caucuses, the Des Moines Register reported the following results from a poll of 800 likely Republican caucus goers from December 27 to December 30, 2007:

- Mike Huckabee - 32%
- Mitt Romney - 26%
- John McCain - 13%
- Fred Thompson - 9%
- Ron Paul - 9%
- Rudy Giuliani - 5%
- Duncan Hunter - 1%
- Alan Keyes - 1%
- Not sure/Uncommitted - 4%

The above results have a margin of sampling error of ±3.5 percentage points.

Mike Huckabee's results in the opinion polls rose from 29% in the Des Moines Register's poll in late November 2007. Mitt Romney rose two points from 24% in November to 26% in December. John McCain enjoyed the biggest increase from November, increasing six points from 7% to 13%, while Rudy Giuliani suffered the biggest drop from November, decreasing eight points from 13% to 5%. Giuliani's large drop was attributed to his strategy of skipping early states such as Iowa and New Hampshire in favor of larger, delegate-rich states such as Florida, California, and New York. No other candidate polled more than 10%.

Huckabee's poll numbers in Iowa rose dramatically from October to December, in part due to his backing among evangelical voters, who accounted for almost one-half of those polled. Huckabee led Romney in that group 47%-20%. Huckabee also polled higher than Romney among the group who said it was more important to be a social conservative than a fiscal conservative, while Romney led Huckabee 29%-25% among the group who said that being fiscally conservative was most important. In addition, Romney also polled highest in the categories of experience and competence, the ability to bring about change, and electability.

== Results of the January 2008 caucuses ==
Because Iowa's delegates aren't officially bound to candidates, the delegates given to each candidate below are rough estimates.

As of 11:05 p.m. EDT, January 4, 2008, with 100% of the votes reported, the results were:

100% of precincts reporting
Candidate	Votes	Percentage	Delegates
Mike Huckabee	40,954	34.36%	13
Mitt Romney	30,021	25.19%	9
Fred Thompson	15,960	13.39%	5
John McCain	15,536	13.03%	5
Ron Paul	11,841	9.93%	4
Rudy Giuliani	4,099	3.44%	1
Duncan Hunter	506	0.42%	0
Alan Keyes	247	0.21%	0
John Cox*	10	.01%	0
Hugh Cort	5	0%	0
Tom Tancredo*	5	0%	0
Vern Wuensche	2	0%	0
Sam Brownback*	1	0%	0
Cap Fendig	1	0%	0
Total	119,188	100%	37

*Candidate had already dropped out of the race prior to caucus.

Only three candidates won either pluralities or majorities in individual counties: Mike Huckabee, Mitt Romney, and Ron Paul. The Giuliani campaign followed an unusual strategy of focusing on larger states that vote later in the process, and had done little if any campaigning in Iowa. Tancredo had already withdrawn from the presidential race two weeks earlier and endorsed Romney, but his name remained in the official list of candidates of the Iowa Republican Party.

Some 120,000 Iowa Republicans attended the 2008 caucuses, a new record. About 87,000 attended in 2000; in 2004, George W. Bush ran unopposed.

== See also ==
- Iowa caucuses
- 2008 Iowa Democratic presidential caucuses
- 2008 Republican Party presidential primaries
