= Tom Tancredo 2008 presidential campaign =

Tom Tancredo 2008 US presidential campaign

Tancredo for a Secure America
- Campaign: U.S. presidential election, 2008
- Candidate: Tom Tancredo; Congressman (1999–2009)
- Affiliation: Republican Party
- Status: Withdrawn
- Headquarters: Vienna, Virginia
- Key people: Bay Buchanan (Senior Advisor); Phil Alexander (advisor)
- Receipts: US$6.2 (2007-12-31)
- Slogan: For a Secure America

Website
- teamtancredo.org (archived - February 12, 2007)

The 2008 presidential campaign of Tom Tancredo, a Congressman from Colorado began on April 2, 2007, with a formal announcement. The campaign garnered grassroots support and endorsements from conservative Republicans concerned about illegal immigration and border security. However, Tancredo remained low in the polls and was criticized for his nativist campaign, which had been described as "single-issued." Tancredo stated that he probably would not win the nomination but hoped his campaign would bring forth more debate on his issue of concern, immigration. On December 20, 2007, Tancredo withdrew from the presidential race, and endorsed Mitt Romney.

== Campaign development ==
Prior to his announcement early in 2007, draft movements sprung to try to convince Congressman Tancredo to run for President of the United States. Tancredo responded to the draft efforts by stating that he would only start a campaign if a candidate already in the race did not extensively address the issue of Immigration and stay committed to conservative principles.

After Tancredo's announcement on April 2, 2007, he immediately began campaigning in the strategically important state of New Hampshire, making his first appearance at a meeting and a speech in Hudson and Nashua on April 4. Following this, Tancredo campaigned in the first caucus state of Iowa on April 14 at a fundraiser in Des Moines. Tancredo made over 90 campaign appearances in the state of Iowa (more than any other) and appeared in Des Moines five times. He appeared in New Hampshire approximately 35 times and appeared sporadically in other states in the same time span.

Until June, the campaign never took off in the polls nor in funds and received little media attention, with the exception of the May 15 GOP debate in South Carolina. However, Tancredo was given an opportunity to discuss immigration and attack the Bush administration and fellow Republican members of Congress at a GOP debate in New Hampshire on June 5, 2007. His criticism was directed mostly at top tiered candidate John McCain for his support of the failed "Amnesty bill." But throughout the night, he continually criticized the policies of the Bush administration, which he labeled as "liberal." When asked what President Bush's role would be in a Tancredo administration, he reflected on a time in 2003 when he was told by Karl Rove to "[not] darken the doorstep of the White House" because of his criticism of the president. Tancredo concluded that President Bush would be given the same command if he ever became president. During the debate in regards to immigration and Republican members of Congress, Tancredo said the following:

We're not just talking about the number of jobs that we may be losing or the number of kids that are in our schools and impacting our school system or the number of people that are abusing our hospital system and taking advantage of the welfare system in this country. We're not just talking about that. We're talking about something that goes to the very heart of this nation: whether or not we will actually survive as a nation.And here's what I mean by that. What we're doing here in this immigration battle is testing our willingness to actually hold together as a nation or split apart into a lot of balkanized pieces.We are testing our willingness to actually hold on to something called the English language, something that is the glue that is supposed to hold us together as a nation. We are becoming a bilingual nation. And that is not good. And that is the fearful part of this. The ramifications are much, much more significant than any that we've been discussing so far. And so, yes, I have said dramatic things. And, yes, I am willing to do whatever is necessary to try to stop this piece of legislation. And that includes go after any Republican that votes for it, because the Republicans can stop this.

— Tom Tancredo

As July approached and came to its close, Tancredo's standing improved somewhat with the looming Ames Straw Poll. His strategy to focus on Iowa continued, and the number of grassroots supporters in the state increased. On July 31, the campaign developed an interesting new strategy, offering a trip to Washington, D.C., and a tour of the capitol to anyone who brought 25 Tancredo supporters to the straw poll. On the day before, supporters in Iowa distributed T-shirts which read "I'm a Member of Tom's Army Against Amnesty." Interviewed supporters were asked why they supported the candidate, they replied, "He really has the concerns of America at heart, he's concerned about the culture of America itself. What's happening to the bedrock of American culture." Tancredo finished in fourth place at the Ames Straw poll with over 14% of the vote. It was won by former Massachusetts Governor Mitt Romney.

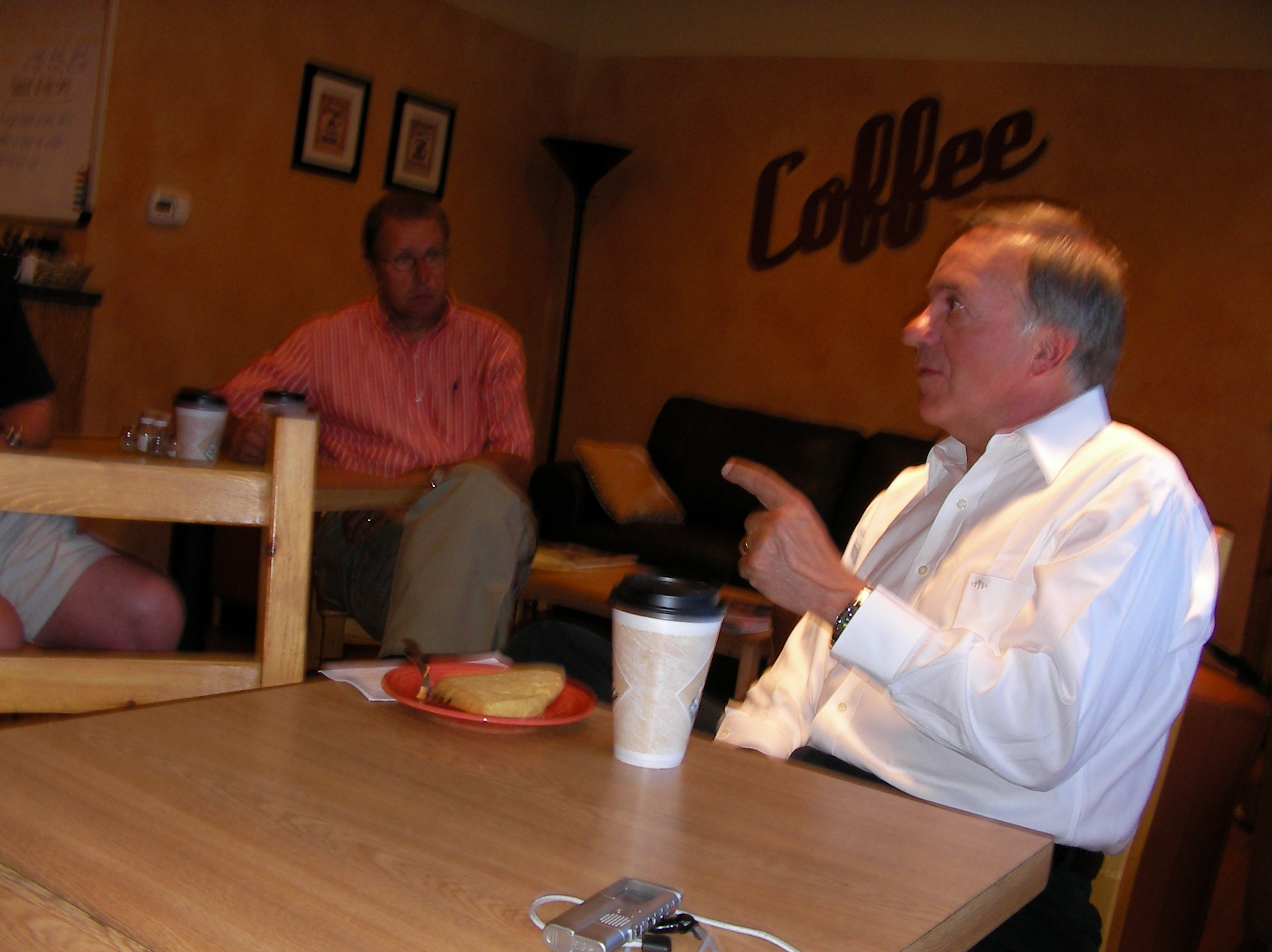
Tancredo campaigns in Adel, Iowa on July 16

On August 31, Tancredo shifted momentarily to a new issue. On the second anniversary of the landfall of Hurricane Katrina in New Orleans, he called for funds to be withdrawn and federal aid be cut off for the recovery effort. He remarked that it was time, "the taxpayer gravy train left the New Orleans station." The move was perhaps a step for the candidate to woo fiscal conservatives and advocates for states' rights, commenting that "at some point, state and local officials and individuals have got to step up to the plate and take some initiative, the mentality that people can wait around indefinitely for the federal taxpayer to solve all their worldly problems has got to come to an end."

all I've heard is people trying to out-Tancredo Tancredo.

In September Tancredo participated in two debates which received much media attention for the decisions of top tiered candidates to not participate in them. He attended the Values Voters Debate in Fort Lauderdale, Florida on September 17, 2007. In the straw poll that followed, Tancredo came in seventh place with 2% of the vote. Mike Huckabee won the straw poll with 63%. Tancredo also appeared at the Black Caucus Debate on September 27 at Baltimore, Maryland which aired on PBS. During this debate he commented that the economic differences between African Americans and Anglo-Americans have "nothing to do with race." He also discussed illegal immigration.

On September 25, Tancredo became the first presidential candidate to be interviewed on Wikinews. He discussed gay issues, immigration, and federalism among others. When asked who he would back if he had to support a Democratic Party candidate for president, Tancredo chose Senator Barack Obama of Illinois remarking:

Although I couldn't vote for him, if I had to support one for a nominee it would be Obama, and I would do so because first, I believe we could beat him [laughs], but secondly, and less cynically, I think it would be very good to have a black man, a good family man, and a very articulate man, to have him as a role model for a lot of black children in this country.

In October with the World Series approaching and Tancredo's team the Colorado Rockies representing the National League, he decided to offer a bet with fellow candidate Mitt Romney whose team the Boston Red Sox were representing the American League. Tancredo proposed that he would drop out of the race if Boston won but only if Romney agreed to drop out if Colorado won. Luckily for Tancredo, the Romney campaign turned down the bet and Boston won the world series.

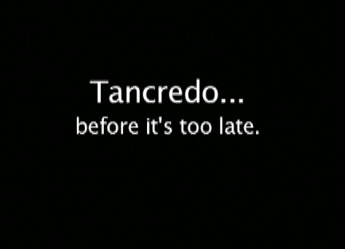
Screenshot of Tancredo's "Tough on Terror" advertisement

On November 13, the campaign released a controversial advertisement called "Tough on Terror" in which a hypothetical terrorist attack occurs in a shopping mall. The ad blames inept border security for the attack and flashes images of an injured child and a wrecked train. After Tancredo gives his approval for the message with the comment "I approve this message because someone needs to say it," a voiceover states, "There are consequences to open borders beyond the 20 million aliens who have come to take our jobs... the price we pay for spineless politicians who refuse to defend our borders against those who come to kill." Since its release, the ad received criticism from some who called it "cheap" and "blatant fearmongering." Bowdoin College political scientist Michael Franz likened the advertisement to the Daisy ad run by Lyndon B. Johnson in the 1964 Presidential election claiming that the election of Barry Goldwater would lead to a nuclear war. The other Republican candidates in the race did not comment on the ad.

On November 15, in a move poking fun at Democratic presidential candidate John Edwards and building on the media coverage aimed at his campaign for the previously mentioned advertisement, Tancredo received a haircut for $400, which was used to donate money to the Autism Society of America. The haircut was given by David Holden of New Hampshire, whose son has autism.

In early December, Tancredo declined an invitation to a Spanish-language debate featured on Univision as a protest to immigrants who do not learn English. He did, however, participate in the November 28, 2007 debate where he accused his opponents, most notable Mike Huckabee of trying to "out-Tancredo, Tancredo" on the issue of illegal immigration.

On December 20, 2007, Tancredo dropped out of the presidential race and thus ended his campaign. He cited that it had become apparent to him that he could not win the race but was glad at what he perceived as the new positions of his opponents on illegal immigration, believing that "we've (The Tom Tancredo campaign) forced them into that [rhetoric]..." Tancredo also cited Huckabee's surge as a reason for his withdraw, stating his disagreements with the Governor made it important to help Romney secure the nomination. While announcing his withdrawal, Tancredo also announced that he was endorsing Mitt Romney for President in 2008, citing Romney as "the best hope for our cause [of immigration reform]."

== Polling ==
About one year before entering the race, Tancredo won the Macomb County Straw Poll in Michigan on July 5, 2006. He received 60 of the 327 votes cast or 18% of the vote. Tancredo beat out the second-place finisher Rudy Giuliani by 15 votes. On February 13, 2007, the American Conservative Union issued ratings for potential presidential candidates for the 2008 election. Tancredo took first with a lifetime ranking of 99 out of 100. The website ConservativesBetrayed.com polled 525 people who attended CPAC 2007, and 88.1% believed that Tancredo would govern as a conservative. Newt Gingrich polled next at 87.9%.

In general polling, Tancredo fared far worse than in straw polls. Early polls placed the candidate both above and below the 1% mark. However, in November 2007 he slightly moved up in polling, reaching the 2% mark and coming out ahead of his closest rival, Congressman Duncan Hunter of California. In a November 16 Gallup poll, Tancredo stood in seventh place at 2%, trailing Congressman Ron Paul of Texas by 3%. In a head-to-head matchup done by Rasmussen Reports on August 29, 2007, Tancredo trailed New York Senator Hillary Clinton by 13% finishing with 37% to Clinton's 50%. In a head-to-head matchup with Barack Obama administered on the same day, Tancredo finished with 31% to 48% for Obama.

== Financials ==
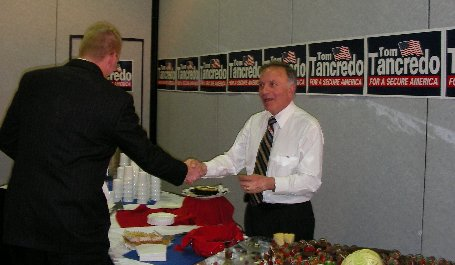
Tancredo raising funds at a Lincoln Day Dinner on April 14

Individual contributions made up most of the campaign cash that Tancredo received, making up about 97% of his total pocketbook. PAC contributions were comparably low, producing only around $75,500, of the $1,311,869. He granted himself $200 for the campaign and received no federal funding. $88,457 of his money came from interest from the campaign's bank accounts and loans from outside sources. The majority of Tancredo's funds were not disclosed during the campaign As of September 30, 2007 the campaign raised $3,538,244 and spent $3,458,130, leaving only $110,079 cash on hand.

Ronald Robinson of the Young America's Foundation donated $1,000 to the campaign. Michael Bushell, owner of BibleWorks and Pueblo Chieftain newspaper publisher Robert Rawlings both gave $500 to Tancredo's campaign.

Tancredo qualified for and accepted public funds from the Presidential election campaign fund checkoff. However, he returned the matching funds since withdrawing from the race.

== Advisors and endorsements ==
List of People endorsing Tom Tancredo

Tancredo's endorsers include:

- State Representative Daniel C Itse (R-NH)
- Former Treasurer of the United States Bay Buchanan
- Phil Alexander, advisor
- Shelly Uscinski, New Hampshire advisor
- Bill Salier, Iowa advisor
- Tim Haley, campaign official
- Robert Rawlings, publisher of the Pueblo Chieftain
- Michael Bushell, owner of BibleWorks
- Jacob Lentz, writer for Jimmy Kimmel Live!
- Ronald Robinson, head of the Young America's Foundation

The biggest endorsement that Tancredo received was that of Bay Buchanan, the sister of former presidential candidate Pat Buchanan and former Treasurer of the United States under President Ronald Reagan. Immediately following her endorsement she was named the Senior Advisor of the campaign. Other advisors included Phil Alexander, formerly of the Buchanan campaigns in 1996, and 2000. New Hampshire advisor, Shelly Uscinski formerly the New Hampshire chairman of the Christian Coalition. Iowa advisor and former U.S. Senate candidate in 2002 Bill Salier. And campaign official Tim Haley, the former campaign manager of Pat Buchanan's Reform Party run in 2000.

== Primary results ==
Tancredo got 5 votes in the Iowa caucuses, got 80 in the New Hampshire primary, 457 in the Michigan primary, 121 in the South Carolina primary, 1,573 in Florida primary, 3,884 in California primary, 10 in Colorado caucuses, 175 in Delaware primary, 324 in the Georgia primary, 375 in Illinois primary, 107 in Missouri primary, 189 in Oklahoma primary, 194 in Tennessee primary, 3 in Utah primary, 107 in Louisiana primary, 356 in Maryland primary, 185 in Wisconsin primary, and 221 vote in the Mississippi primary.

Tancredo got a total vote count of 8,259.

== Criticism ==
The campaign was criticized for as wide-ranging issues as Tancredo's speaking abilities and performances in debates to the categorization of his campaign as "unwinnable" and "one-issued."

After the October 9, 2007 Dearborn GOP Debate, Tancredo was criticized by the conservative blog, "Republican Ranting" for stuttering and stumbling, citing this as causing him major problems in the debate. Also cited was the following exchange with Sam Brownback:

Tancredo: Sam, I don't, your mom, if she was a postal worker, believe me, she didn't need a union on top of civil service benefits
Brownback: Don't pick on my mother
Tancredo: I'm sure she was a sweetheart.
Brownback: Leave my mother out of this.
Tancredo: Especially with regard to, need I say it, illegal immigration…

Brownback: My mother is not an illegal immigrant.

A writer at the blog Farmeruminations, spoke about his experience at the August 12, 2007 Iowa Straw poll stating that "Tancredo...stuttered and stumbled, spoke during the applause, lost his place several times, so had to look at the written copy, not a good performance by any standard."

The campaign was criticized for focusing too heavily on the issue of immigration, which gave the candidate the appearance of running a one-issue campaign. During an exchange on the August 22, 2007 edition of Hannity and Colmes, Geraldo Rivera and Tancredo got into a lively argument over sanctuary cities and a murder committed by an illegal immigrant in Newark, New Jersey. Rivera remarked:

First of all, this was the 60th homicide in Newark this year, and I'm sure Congressman Tancredo has not opined about any of the other homicides, and only became interested in this one when it became clear that one of the six alleged perpetrators came to this country illegally at the age of 11. That's one thing.

Number two, why was this person, this one of the six around to commit this hideous crime? He was out because he had a 31-count indictment for the rape of a child, and he was out on $15,000 bail, instead of the requisite $450,000 bail that he never could have made and never would have been on the street.

It had nothing to do with his immigration status. And it's just being used by advocates of this crushing anti-immigration policy to make a cheap political point.

The political website "Political Realm" summed up Tancredo's campaign profile with the statement that "In the end, Tancredo is a single-issue candidate and that will not be enough to carry him over the top." Tancredo himself acknowledged that he is a one-issue candidate making the statement at a speech in to the Conservative Political Action Conference (CPAC), "If you want to call me a single-issue candidate, that's fine, just so long as you know that my single issue is the survival and the success of the conservative movement in America." He remarked that his campaign was not about winning the nomination but instead winning over people to his point of view in the race:

...they can say, 'That guy is a racist xenophobe. That guy is just so crazy that we can take a more moderate stance.' To tell you the truth, that's okay with me. It is not the worst thing in the world to have changed the debate so significantly, at least among Republicans running for office, that they are willing to say things like 'We will secure the border' and "We will go after employers." That's the moderate position now...

== See also ==
- Donald Trump 2016 presidential campaign
