= 2008 South Carolina Republican presidential primary =

- January 19, 2008
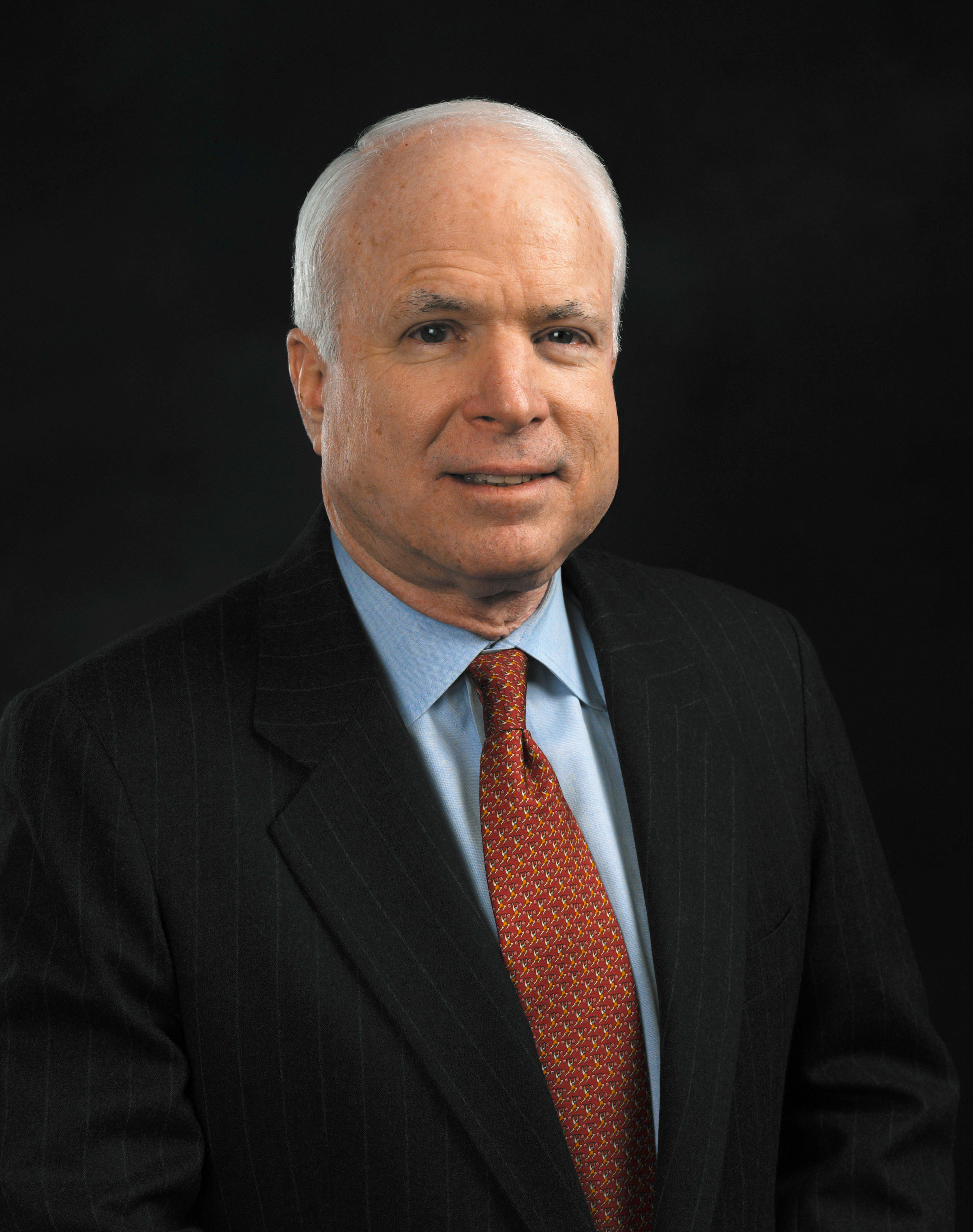

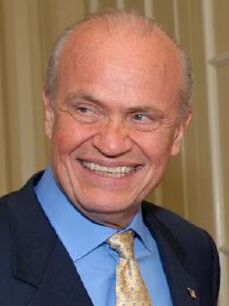

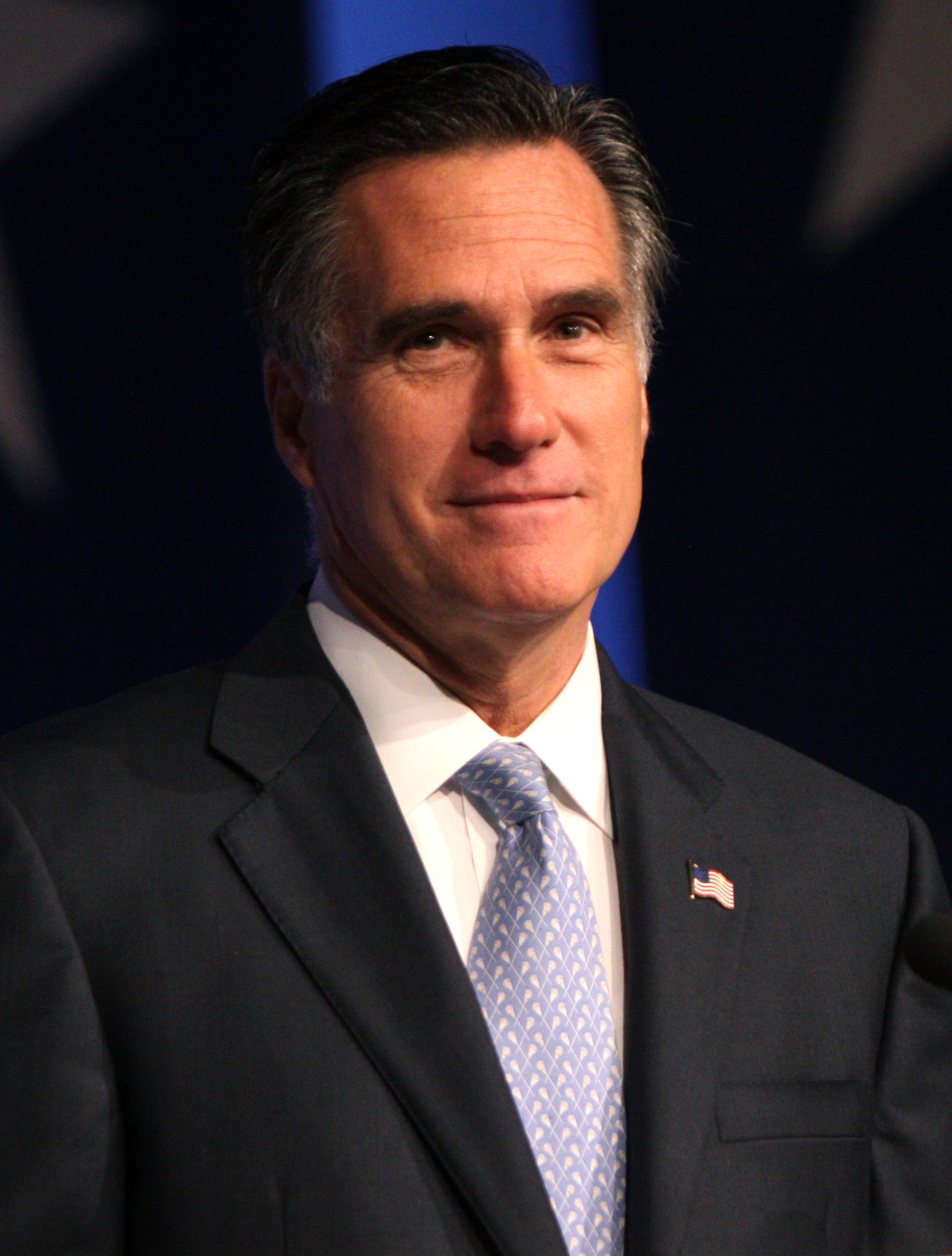
Nominee	John McCain	Mike Huckabee
Home state	Arizona	Arkansas
Delegate count	18	6
Popular vote	147,733	132,990
Percentage	33.15%	29.84%
Nominee	Fred Thompson	Mitt Romney
Home state	Tennessee	Massachusetts
Delegate count	0	0
Popular vote	69,681	68,177
Percentage	15.63%	15.3%
- Election results by county. John McCain Mike Huckabee

The 2008 South Carolina Republican presidential primary was held on January 19, with 24 delegates at stake. The Republican National Committee took half of South Carolina's 47 delegates away from them because the state committee moved its Republican primary before February 5. It was held on the same day as the Nevada Republican caucuses, 2008.

The primary has become one of several key early state nominating contests in the process of choosing the nominee of the Republican party for the November 2008 election for President of the United States. It has historically been more important for the Republican Party than for the Democratic Party; from its inception in 1980 through the election of 2000, the winner of the Republican presidential primary has gone on to win the nomination. As of 2008, the primary has cemented its place as the "First in the South" primary for both parties.

This state's 24 delegates would be awarded on a "Winner-Takes-All" basis. 12 Delegates for the Statewide winner and 12 delegates awarded on a District-winner basis awarding 2 delegates for each of the states then 6 Congressional districts.

== Polling ==
As of January 19, RealClearPolitics reported that the average support from polls placed McCain in the lead with 26.9%, followed by Huckabee with 25.9%, Romney with 14.7%, Thompson with 14.6%, Paul with 4.4%, and Giuliani with 3.4%.

== Results ==
Huckabee was for weeks leading in the state but lost by a 14,743 vote margin. He did manage to win Congressional districts 3, 4 and 5 in the North of the state earning him a total of 6 delegates.

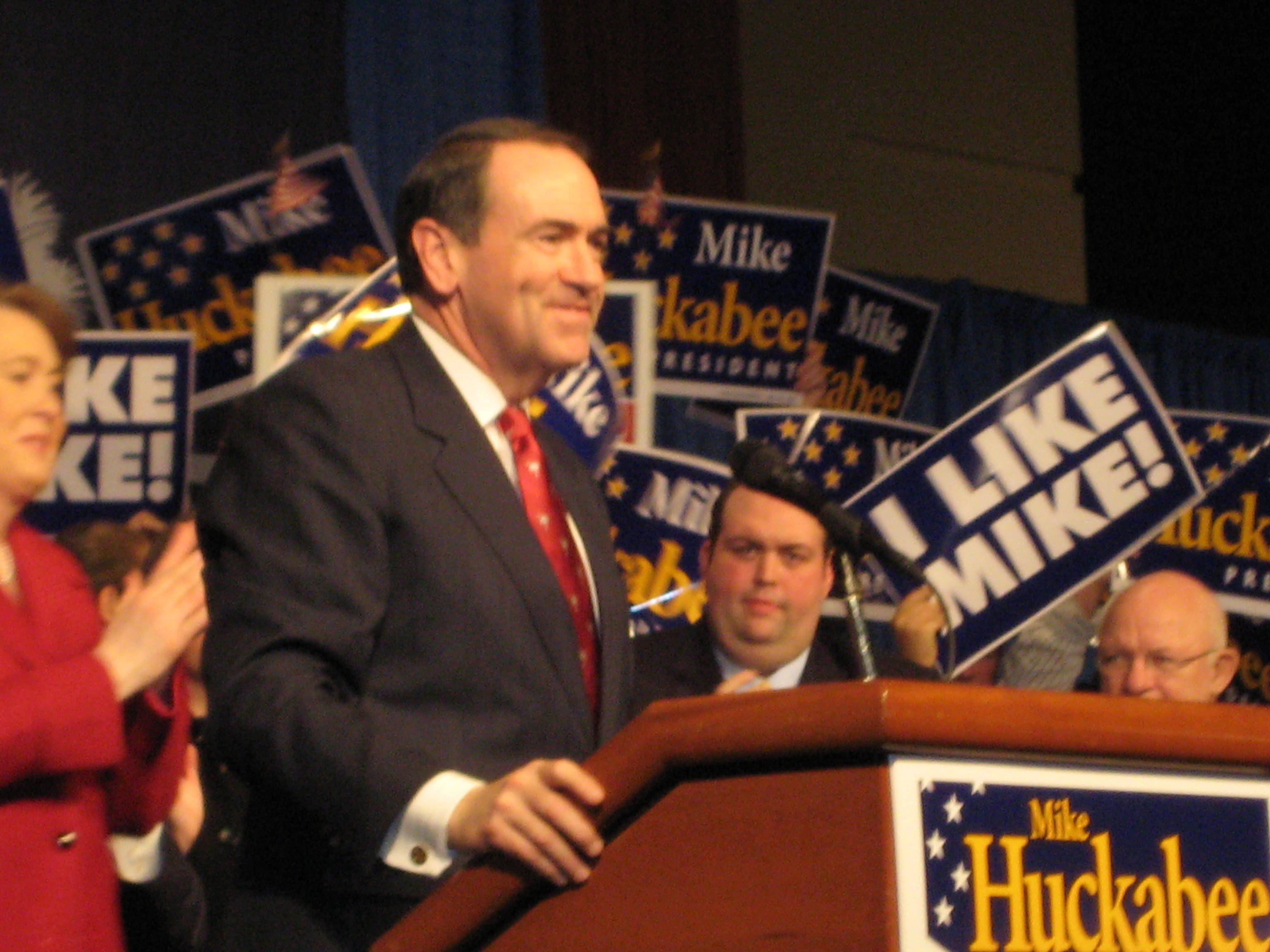
Mike Huckabee giving his concession speech after the 2008 South Carolina Presidential Primary in Columbia, SC.

John McCain won the statewide primary earning him 12 Delegates as well as Congressional Districts 1, 2 and 6. earning him an additional 6 delegates for a total of 18.

100% of precincts reporting
Candidate	Votes	Percentage	Delegates
John McCain	147,733	33.15%	18
Mike Huckabee	132,990	29.84%	6
Fred Thompson	69,681	15.63%	0
Mitt Romney	68,177	15.3%	0
Ron Paul	16,155	3.62%	0
Rudy Giuliani	9,575	2.15%	0
Duncan Hunter*	1,051	0.24%	0
Tom Tancredo*	121	0.03%	0
Hugh Cort	88	0.02%	0
John H. Cox	83	0.02%	0
Cap Fendig	23	0.01%	0
Total	445,677	100%	24

* Candidate withdrew his bid for the nomination prior to the reporting of the primary. On January 22, 2008, after a poor showing Fred Thompson dropped out of the race. Duncan Hunter did so too.

== Results of prior primaries ==
- 1980: Ronald Reagan won with 54%, defeating runner-up John Connally.
- 1984: Uncontested (Reagan was the incumbent president and was re-nominated).
- 1988: George H. W. Bush won with 49%, defeating runner-up Bob Dole.
- 1992: George H. W. Bush won with 68%, defeating runner-up Pat Buchanan.
- 1996: Bob Dole won with 45%, defeating runner-up Pat Buchanan.
- 2000: George W. Bush won with 53%, defeating runner-up John McCain.
- 2004: Uncontested (Bush was the incumbent president and was re-nominated).

== See also ==
- Republican Party (United States) presidential primaries, 2008
- South Carolina primary
- South Carolina Democratic primary, 2008
