= Duncan L. Hunter 2008 presidential campaign =

Campaign for the presidency of US

Duncan Hunter for President 2008
- Campaign: U.S. presidential election, 2008
- Candidate: Duncan L. Hunter; Congressman (1981–2009)
- Affiliation: Republican Party
- Status: Withdrawn
- Headquarters: San Diego, California
- Key people: Sydney Hay (Manager); Roy Tyler (National Communications Director)
- Receipts: US$2.5 (2007-12-31)

Website
- www.gohunter08.com (Archived)

Duncan L. Hunter's 2008 presidential campaign began when fourteen-term Congressman and Vietnam War veteran Duncan L. Hunter of California announced his intentions to run for the 2008 Republican nomination for President of the United States in January 2007.

In the campaign, Hunter emphasized his conservative credentials, focusing on the issues of border security, the war on terrorism, and trade. Throughout 2007, he was in the second tier of Republican candidates, consistently receiving three percent or less support among Republicans in national polls. However, the campaign reached a high point after Hunter won the Texas Straw Poll.

Though he qualified for one National Convention delegate at the Wyoming caucuses, Hunter dropped out of the race in January 2008, following a poor turnout in the Nevada caucuses.

== Background ==
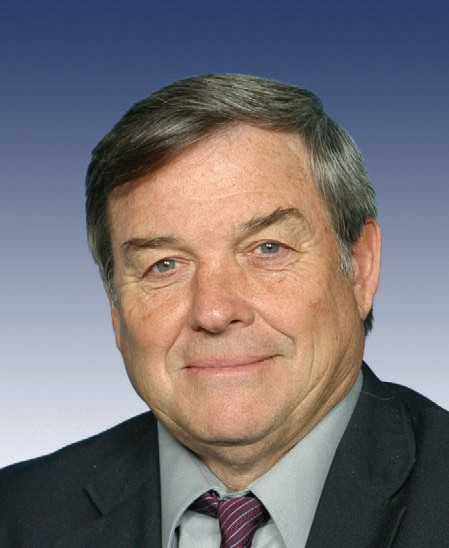
Official Congressional photo of Hunter.

Hunter served as a First Lieutenant in the U.S. Army during the Vietnam War. He was awarded a Bronze Star, an Air Medal, and the Vietnam Service Medal for his efforts on the battlefield. Upon his return home, Hunter pursued a career in law and was admitted to the bar in 1976. Four years later, he won election to the U.S. House of Representatives as a Republican in the Reagan Revolution.

At the onset of the 2008 campaign, Hunter had served in Congress since 1981; representing California's 42nd (1981–83), 45th (1983-93), and 52nd (since 1993) congressional districts. During his tenure, he boasted a 92% lifetime rating from the American Conservative Union (ACU). Some of his successes included the passage of legislation leading to the construction of the 14-mile double-fence from the Pacific Ocean to Otay Mesa along the U.S.-Mexico border. He also helped pass the Secure Fence Act of 2006, which provided for the construction of an additional 670 miles of fence. As a member of the House Armed Services Committee, Hunter pushed for increased military spending and advancements in military technology. He became chairman of the committee in 2003 and remained in the position until the Democratic Party won the majority of the House in the 2006 mid-term election.

== Announcement ==
On October 30, 2006, before a crowd of about 100 people on the Naval Base San Diego waterfront, Hunter announced the formation of an exploratory committee to begin raising campaign funds and organizing supporters for the Republican Party's 2008 presidential nomination. He reasoned, "[t]his is going to be a long road, it's a challenging road, there's going to be some rough and tumble, but I think it's the right thing to do for our country." He did not seek advice from party leaders before making the decision. The New York Times described the move as a "surprise." Mesa College Political Science professor Carl Luna speculated that Hunter's run was an attempt to find "something to do" in preparation for his loss of the Armed Services Committee chairmanship with Democrats heavily favored to reclaim the House. Political analysts saw little chance for the campaign's success. Claremont McKenna College government professor Jack Pitney argued that due to low name recognition and "no following within the party", Hunter "faces extremely long odds".

After the announcement, Hunter received the endorsement of retired Air Force Brigadier General Chuck Yeager. He won the January 13, 2007 Maricopa County, Arizona straw poll, edging all three projected top tier candidates including Massachusetts Governor Mitt Romney, Senator John McCain of Arizona, and former New York City Mayor Rudy Giuliani. Ten days later, Hunter filed papers with the Federal Election Commission to officially begin his presidential campaign.

== Campaign developments ==
=== First half of 2007 ===
In order to build support early in the campaign, Hunter participated in local straw polls. On March 1, at the Spartanburg, South Carolina poll, Hunter finished a close third in a statistical tie with McCain and Giuliani. The showing impressed Spartanburg Republican Gerald Emory who referred to Hunter as, "a true Ronald Reagan conservative that we can support." The following month he won the Anderson County, South Carolina straw poll and tied for second place in both the Greenwood County and Pickens County straw polls. Hunter thanked the counties for their support, which he claimed provided "a huge boost." He added, "[i]t is clear our message of maintaining a strong national defense, securing our border without amnesty, holding China accountable on trade, and protecting life are resonating with the voters. Our campaign is one of issues, not flash and expense. We don't have a jet or an army of consultants and paid staff. We do have the conservative message that is true. In the end, that will be what Americans want."

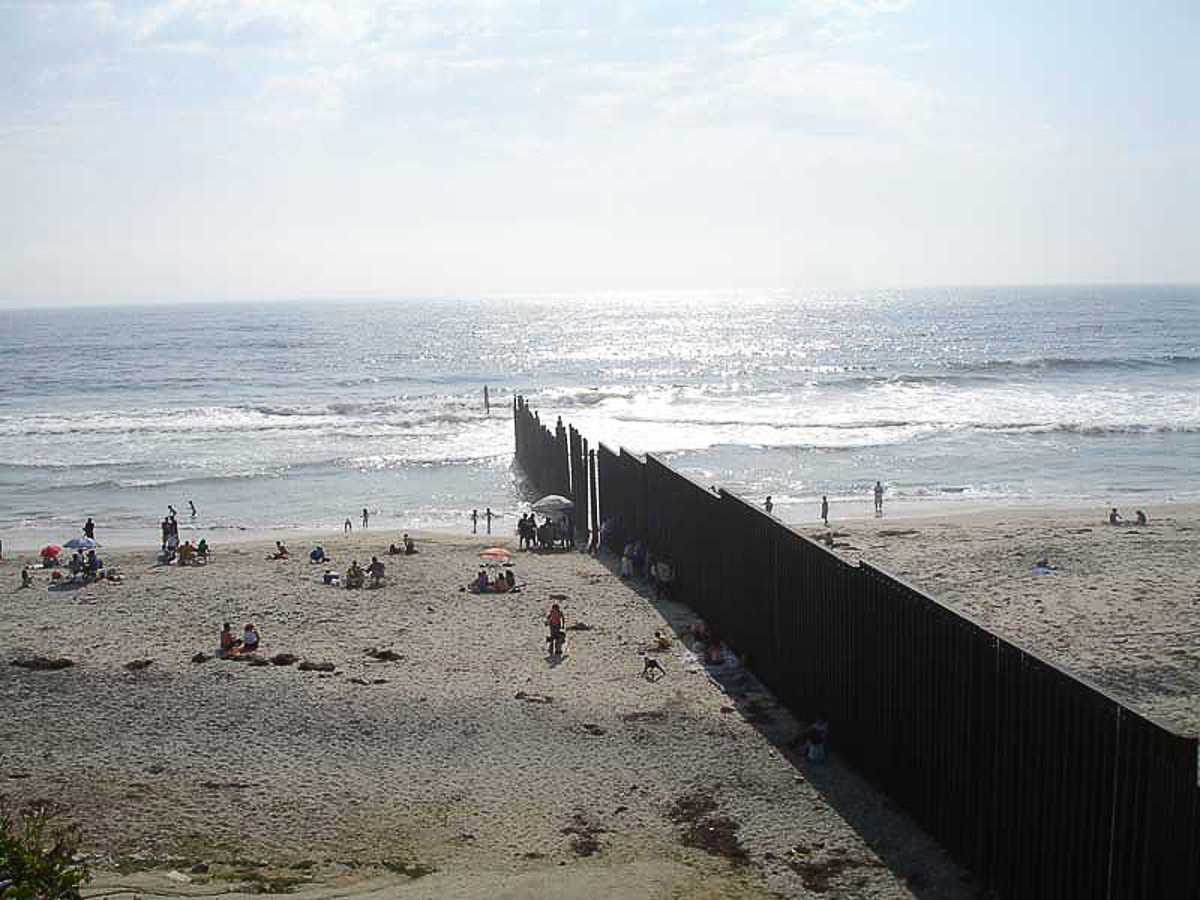
Border fence along the border near San Diego.

This administration has a case of the slows on border enforcement.

— Duncan L. Hunter

Hunter participated in all televised Republican Party (GOP) debates until January 5, 2008; noted for his role in the May 15 South Carolina debate where he discussed his experience with border security. "I built the border fence in San Diego", he claimed, arguing it contributed to reductions in the smuggling of narcotics by 90% and a 50% drop in crime. Speaking of the bill Congress passed to build 854 miles (1,374 km) of border fence across the Southwest, he noted that as of that moment (May 15, 2007), only two miles of the fence had been built. He quipped "this [Bush] administration has a case of the slows on border enforcement."

The next month, Hunter participated in the third GOP debate, featured on CNN. During the forum, he discussed his experience as chairman of the Armed Services Committee and voiced his support for the War in Iraq and the training of Iraqi battalions for security there. Hunter speculated that Iran was helping to arm the insurgency in Iraq. When asked what he would do as president if he discovered Iran was developing a nuclear weapon, Hunter stated that he "would authorize the use of tactical nuclear weapons [to end development] if there was no other way to preempt..." After discussing foreign policy, Hunter turned his attention to the issue of immigration. He again mentioned the importance of a border wall and evoked the audience's memory about the fence he helped build in his congressional district, joking "if they (illegal immigrants) get across my fence [in San Diego], we sign them up for the Olympics immediately." At the end of the debate, Hunter took the opportunity to criticize the three frontrunners: John McCain, Rudy Giuliani, and Mitt Romney. He complained that Democratic Senator Ted Kennedy of Massachusetts exerted too much influence on the three men, describing them as the "Kennedy Wing of the Republican Party."

=== Second half of 2007 ===
A Gallup poll from early July 2007 showed Hunter with three percent support, placing the campaign behind only Rudy Giuliani, Fred Thompson, Mitt Romney, and John McCain. In addition, Hunter won the backing of political commentator Ann Coulter. Hunter described Coulter as "a particularly articulate spokeswoman for the conservative view."

In late August 2007, Hunter's campaign communication's director, Roy Tyler commented that the chances of Hunter winning the nomination were the same as "pushing a string through a maze." This came as Hunter spoke to students at the Brown-Lupton Student Center about two foci of his campaign: border security and fair trade with China. He continued campaigning after hearing of the statement and won the Texas Straw Poll a few days later with Tyler at his side.

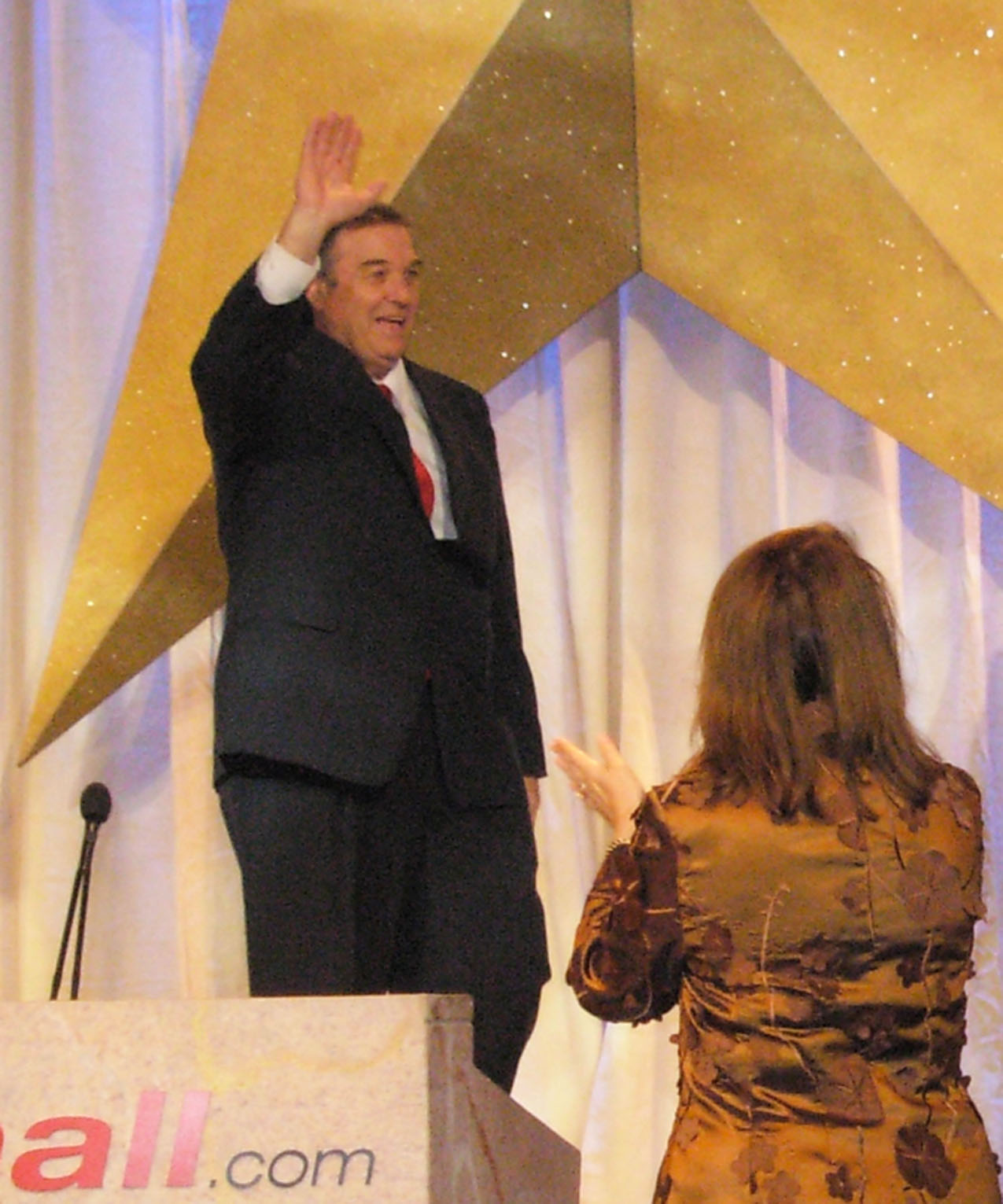
Duncan L. Hunter greets the delegation at the Texas Republican Straw Poll at the Fort Worth Convention Center September 1, 2007, and is applauded by Texas GOP Chairman Tina Benkiser.

After his victory in the Straw poll, Hunter received media attention for his response to Iranian president Mahmoud Ahmadinejad's invitation to speak to students at Columbia University. He criticized the school for its decision, stating that "if the left-wing leaders of academia will not support our troops, they, in the very least, should not support our adversaries..." He then called for a revocation of federal funding to the University. These statements resulted in criticism from liberals such as Glenn Greenwald, who described Hunter's proposal as "dangerous", "improper" and "unconstitutional".

Later in the month, Hunter's campaign website was hacked by anti-war activists. For a few hours, the words, "hacked by Adnali f0r TurkStorm [dot] org No War!" above images of children in a warzone were posted to Hunter's site. Turkstorm.org, cited in the hacking, appeared to have no connection as IP analysis identified the hackers location in Germany. Roy Tyler revealed that hackers had attempted to change the website at least six times, but this was the first successful alteration.

At the October 21 Florida GOP Debate, after expressing that questioner Carl Cameron was trying to divide the Republican Party, Hunter raised an issue he thought might bring the participants together. He reminisced of the time, he felt the "Democrat Party [sic] lost its identity". He compared the Kennedy administration's failed Bay of Pigs Invasion with President Ronald Reagan's actions in El Salvador. He described Reagan's El Salvador policy as successful in advancing freedom, and noted that as he spoke, the military of El Salvador was "fighting side by side with our guys (The United States military) in Iraq." He then referred to the Republican Party as "the Party of Freedom."

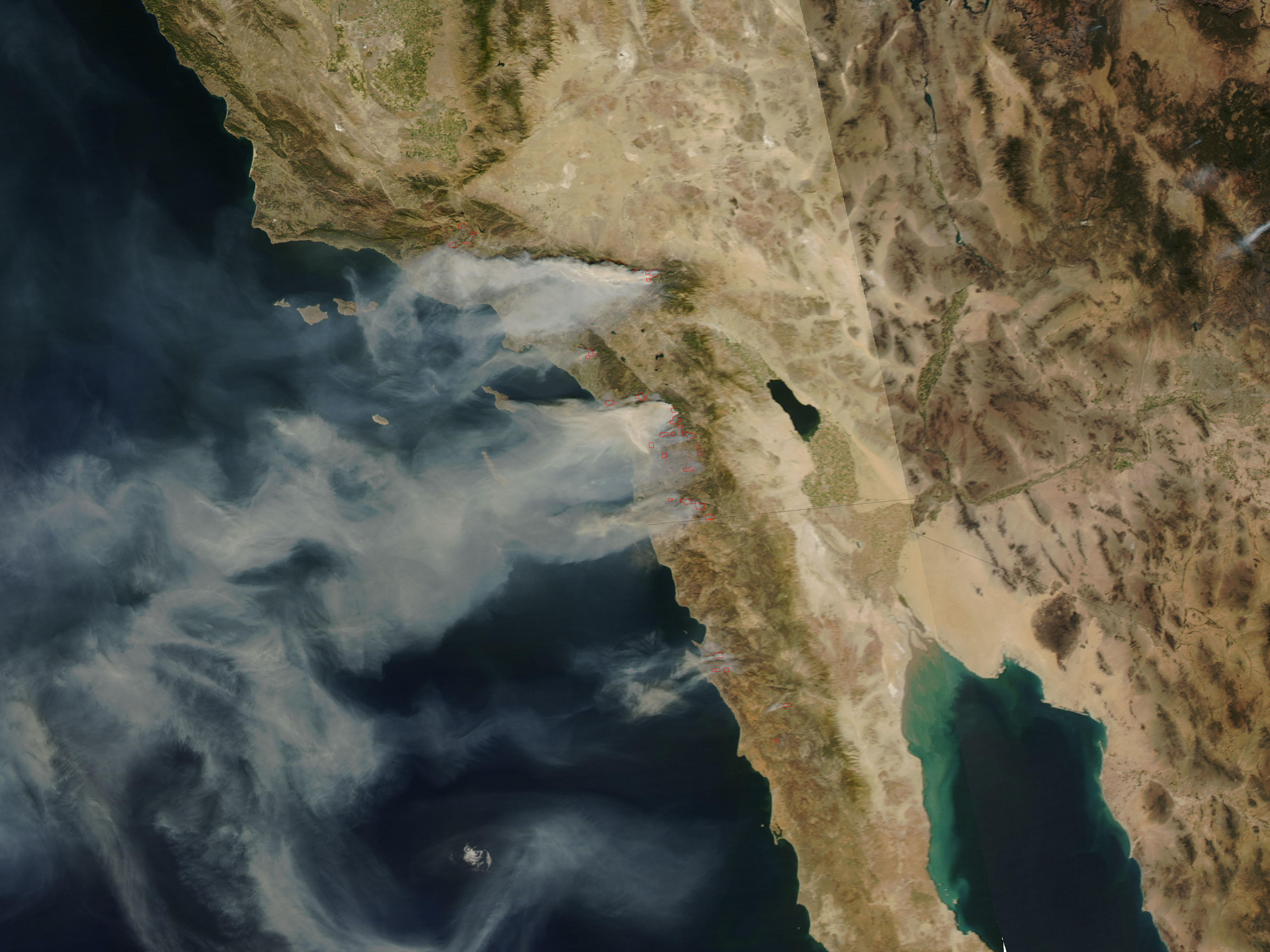
The California wildfires of October 2007 burn in Hunter's congressional district seen in this satellite NASA photo

Following the debate, Hunter learned that parts of his congressional district were burning as a result of the California wildfires of October 2007. He immediately stalled campaigning for a short period to help his constituents with the recovery effort. Hunter criticized those who connected the wildfires to the lack of resources because of the War in Iraq. He argued those conclusions were invalid because of San Diego's direct access to troops, helicopters and equipment. During an update with Neil Cavuto, Hunter remarked that those critics "have got to have some creative writers to somehow link these..."

In November 8, Hunter received the endorsement of the Missouri Republican Assembly (MRA). The assembly cited Hunter as a "true Republican" who shared their views.

San Diego selected Hunter as grand marshal for the city's Veterans Day parade. He considered this selection as an honor.

Hunter participated in the November 28, 2007 CNN/YouTube GOP Debate, and notably, received a question about the military's "Don't ask, don't tell" policy. The questioner, former Brig. Gen. Keith Kerr introduced himself as a homosexual and asked "...why you [Republican candidates] think that American men and women in uniform are not professional enough to serve with gays and lesbians?" Hunter thanked the general for his service and then argued that the sole issue was "unit cohesion," mirroring a statement from former Secretary of State Colin Powell. After the debate, Kerr was found to be a member of Hillary Clinton's Lesbian, Gay, Bisexual and Transsexual Americans For Hillary Steering Committee. Because of this, CNN removed footage of the question from future telecasts. The next day, Hunter sent a letter to Hillary Clinton that read: "Dear Hillary Clinton, Regarding the "plant", retired Brig. Gen. Keith H. Kerr, that you sent to ask me the question at the CNN-YouTube debate last night in Florida. Send more!!! Merry Christmas, Duncan Hunter." The Hillary Clinton campaign did not respond to the letter.

In the December 8 American Research Group survey, excluding undecided voters, Hunter was statistically tied with Fred Thompson for fourth place in Nevada. In Michigan, Hunter was tied with Thompson and Ron Paul for fifth place at four percent, according to a WXYZ-TV poll. Los Angeles Times columnist Don Frederick pointed out that Hunter's support in the polls came almost entirely from Republican men, where he garnered 6% among that demographic in the publication's poll from December 2007. Among women, his support was nearly zero.

Hunter received the endorsement of former U.S. Senator Bob Smith of New Hampshire on December 21. In a letter to New Hampshire Republicans ahead of the first-in-nation New Hampshire Primary, Smith cited Hunter as the best candidate to carry the "Reagan Torch" and the most qualified candidate to protect conservative values.

=== Primary and caucus results 2008 ===
Hunter finished seventh in the January 3, 2008 Iowa Republican caucuses receiving only 0.5 percent (515 of the 100,593 votes cast) and no delegates. ABC News subsequently denied him an invitation to the January 5 Debate, because Hunter did not meet the five percent polling threshold necessary for participation. However, Hunter focused only minimally on Iowa, putting more resources into the first primary state of New Hampshire. Unlike the other GOP candidates, Hunter traveled to Wyoming for the January 5, 2008 Wyoming Republican County Conventions. The mainstream media largely ignored the event, and Hunter had campaigned in the state more than any other candidate. Hunter won one national delegate and one alternate delegate after finishing in third place in the caucus behind winner Mitt Romney and second place Fred Thompson. That same day, Hunter addressed the Nevada Republican Assembly at their Presidential Endorsing Convention. He won their endorsement after receiving a two-thirds majority of all votes cast the next day. At the first in the nation New Hampshire primary on January 8, Hunter finished in seventh place with only one percent of the vote.

=== Withdrawal ===
After finishing in last place in the Michigan Republican primary (receiving one percent), the Nevada Republican caucuses (two percent), and the South Carolina Republican primary (zero), Hunter dropped out of the race on January 19, 2008. In his withdrawal speech, delivered from the same Naval Base San Diego pier, where he announced his campaign in October 2006, Hunter thanked his supporters, expressed the amusement he and his family had had on the campaign trail and the influence he had on the debate within the party:

The failure of our campaign to gain traction is mine and mine alone, but we have driven the issues of national security, the border fence, the emergence of China and the need to reverse bad trade policy. Because of that, this campaign has been very worthwhile, and for the Hunter family, a lot of fun.

Four days later, Hunter endorsed former Arkansas governor Mike Huckabee for the Republican nomination. Late Show with David Letterman poked fun at Hunter's relative obscurity by making a mock statement regarding his withdrawal, saying "we don't know what he actually looks like" and substituting Hunter's picture with that of character actor Ben Gazzara.

== Endorsements ==
List of people who endorsed Duncan L. Hunter
- Frm. Sen. Bob Smith (R-NH)
- Rep. John Culberson (R-TX)
- Rep. Terry Everett (R-AL)
- Rep. Trent Franks (R-AZ)
- Rep. Ralph Hall (R-TX)
- Rep. Gary Miller (R-CA)
- Rep. Jim Saxton (R-NJ)
- Rep. Bill Young (R-FL)
- Retired Air Force Brigadier General Chuck Yeager
- Political commentator Ann Coulter
- Vietnam War veteran John E. O'Neill

== Aftermath ==
Following the withdrawal, Hunter remained in Congress until his term expired in 2009. In 2008, his son Duncan D. Hunter won the Republican primary for his seat. The younger Hunter went on to win the election and succeeded his father.
