= Rudy Giuliani 2008 presidential campaign =

American political campaign

Rudy Giuliani for President 2008
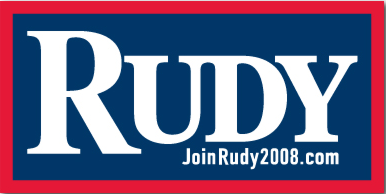
- Campaign: 2008 U.S. presidential election
- Candidate: Rudy Giuliani; Mayor of New York City (1994–2001)
- Affiliation: Republican Party
- Status: Announced Feb. 5th, 2007; Suspended Jan. 30th, 2008
- Headquarters: Los Angeles
- Key people: Mike DuHaime (Manager); Pat Oxford (Chairman); David Dreier (National Co-Chairman); Tony Carbonetti (Chief Political Advisor); Mark Campbell (Political Director); Katie Levinson (Communications Director); Bob Holste (Coalitions Director); Chris Henick (Senior Advisor)
- Receipts: US$60.9 million (2007-12-31)
- Slogan: Tested · Ready · Now

Website
- www.joinrudy2008.com (archived - January 26, 2008)

The 2008 presidential campaign of Rudy Giuliani began following the formation of the Draft Giuliani movement in October 2005. The next year, Giuliani opened an exploratory committee and formally announced in February 2007 that he was actively seeking the presidential nomination of the Republican Party.

At the onset of the campaign, Giuliani held a significant lead in the nationwide polls. The candidacy of Senator John McCain faltered, and Giuliani maintained his lead in both national polls and fundraising throughout 2007. Political observers predicted that Giuliani would lose support, and he was criticized for a lack of substantive policy stances. Eschewing the common strategy of focusing on early-voting states such as Iowa and New Hampshire, Giuliani focused instead on larger states. He campaigned in Florida throughout the primary season, hoping a win in that state's primary would propel him to victory in other primaries on Super Tuesday (February 5).

On January 29, 2008, Giuliani finished third in the Florida primary. The following day, he ended his campaign and endorsed eventual Republican nominee John McCain.

== Background ==
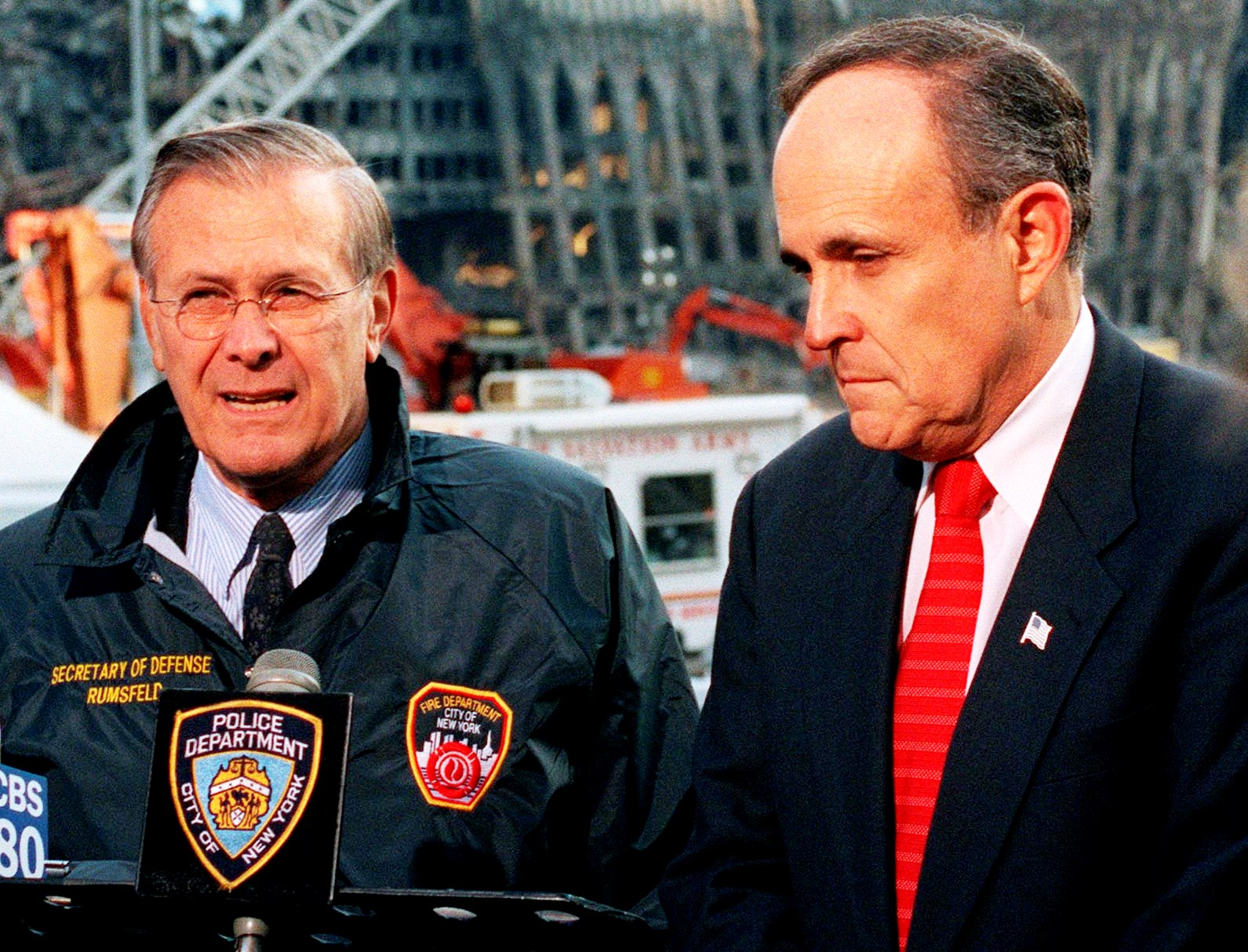
Mayor Giuliani (right) at Ground Zero following the 9/11 attacks, with Secretary of Defense Donald Rumsfeld.

Giuliani's public profile started to rise when he was appointed as the United States Associate Attorney General by President Ronald Reagan. He held the position from 1981 to 1983, when he was appointed United States Attorney for the Southern District of New York. He held this post until 1989, when he resigned to run his first campaign for Mayor of New York City. He lost the race but won four years later, and served as the city's mayor from 1994 to 2001. As mayor, he was best known for his leadership role during the September 11 attacks, when he coordinated and managed the immediate emergency response, earning him the title as Time magazine Person of the Year in 2001. He also positioned himself as "tough on crime" and was often credited with the reduction in offenses that occurred during his tenure in office. Giuliani briefly ran for U.S. Senate in New York to succeed retiring Daniel Patrick Moynihan in 2000, but was forced to withdraw from the race after being diagnosed with prostate cancer. Although he held traditional views on defense and economics, Giuliani was considered socially liberal, holding pro-choice views on abortion, supporting same-sex civil unions and embryonic stem cell research. As mayor, the abortion rate in New York City dropped by 16% in comparison to the 12% drop nationally; adoptions raised by 133%.

A draft movement began in late 2005 to convince Giuliani to run for President of the United States in 2008. "Draft Rudy Giuliani for President, Inc." filed with the Federal Election Commission (FEC), and became the first federal committee formed with the sole purpose of encouraging Giuliani to run. During this time, anti-abortion groups, such as the Republican National Coalition for Life, had already announced their intention to oppose Giuliani, because of his stance on abortion. However, evidence suggested that even among those voters, he enjoyed some support for his possible run. Some social conservatives contended that Giuliani's emphasis on lowering the abortion rate, was a pragmatic view on abortion. Among the overall public, Giuliani was perceived to be a moderate. An August 2006 Rasmussen Reports poll found that 36% of the American public identified the potential candidate as a moderate, while 29% identified him as a conservative and 15% as a liberal. Early polls showed Giuliani with one of the highest levels of name recognition and support, and he was considered a front-runner in the race for the Republican nomination.

Throughout 2006, rumors circulated regarding a possible Giuliani presidential campaign, abetted by hints from the former mayor himself. Over the Independence Day holiday weekend in July 2006, Giuliani declared that he would run for president in 2008 if he could raise sufficient funds. On November 13, 2006, Giuliani announced during a leadership conference in Wilkes-Barre, Pennsylvania that he had taken the first step toward a potential 2008 White House bid by forming the Rudy Giuliani Presidential Exploratory Committee, Inc., allowing him to raise money for national travel and for a presidential campaign.

== 2007 campaign developments ==
On February 5, 2007, Giuliani officially entered the race for the 2008 U.S. presidential election after filing a "statement of candidacy" with the Federal Election Commission. He confirmed his candidacy on the February 14 edition of Larry King Live, firmly stating: "Yes, I'm running." No Italian American had ever been elected president, and Giuliani's run was the most notable by a member of the ethnic group (the only Italian American to be a major-party national ticket nominee was Geraldine Ferraro, the 1984 Democratic Party nominee for vice-president; also, Al Smith's grandfather was Italian).

=== February–May: Early stages ===
Following a series of criticisms from conservatives about his views on abortion, Giuliani made a pledge in February 2007 to nominate Supreme Court Justices in the mold of John Roberts, Samuel Alito, Antonin Scalia, and Anthony Kennedy (all Ronald Reagan appointees, former colleagues of his in the Reagan Justice Department or both).

Giuliani and the nine other Republican presidential contenders participated in the first MSNBC 2008 Republican presidential candidates Debate on May 3, 2007, held at the Ronald Reagan Presidential Library. In the non-scientific six-part MSNBC online vote following the debate, Giuliani finished in 3rd place (15%).

Giuliani portrayed himself as the candidate who could beat Hillary Clinton in the general election by being competitive in traditional blue states such as New York, New Jersey, Connecticut, and Delaware. A May 10, 2007 Quinnipiac University Polling Institute poll put Giuliani ahead of Hillary Clinton, 48% to 42% in Connecticut.

Giuliani participated at the May 15, 2007 GOP debate in South Carolina where the notable exchange occurred when the former mayor challenged a statement made by Congressman Ron Paul. Paul claimed that the United States' presence in the Middle East over the past decade incited hatred towards the United States among many Middle Easterners and provided terrorists with extra incentive to commit the September 11 attacks. The debate was sponsored by Fox News. News Corporation, the parent company of Fox News, is a client of the Bracewell & Giuliani law firm. Accuracy in Media editor Cliff Kincaid charged after the debate that this represented a conflict of interest, and that Fox News moderators Chris Wallace and Wendell Goler and post-debate interviewer Sean Hannity failed to ask Giuliani pertinent follow-up questions regarding the Ron Paul exchange about the causes of the September 11 attacks.

In May, influential Christian conservative leader James Dobson, wrote that he could not fathom Giuliani's stance on the abortion issue and he would not vote for him if he were the Republican presidential nominee. He also cited Giuliani's three marriages and the former mayor's support for civil unions for gays as reasons why he could not support the candidate. Dobson wrote, "I cannot, and will not, vote for Rudy Giuliani in 2008. It is an irrevocable decision."

According to the Federal Election Commission, Giuliani raised $18,029,974 in the first quarter of 2007, second to Mitt Romney among Republicans and fourth overall. Out of that money he spent only $6,080,239. Among that money he raised the second-most from Wall Street of all presidential candidates, with $1.8 million raised.

=== Summer: The campaign heats up ===
In June 2007, Giuliani drew some criticism for dropping out of the August Iowa Straw Poll. Some Republican officials felt the move could be seen as "dissing Iowa." In response, a man in a chicken suit, known as the Iowa Chicken, began demonstrating at Giuliani's appearances in Iowa. Despite this, Giuliani maintained that he was still planning on competing in the Iowa Caucus. Some political observers have opined that the Straw Poll results are bought by campaigns.

America is best when we solve our problems from our strengths, not our weaknesses. Healthcare reform must be based on increased choice, affordability, portability, and individual empowerment.

Giuliani had emerged as the frontrunner after overtaking John McCain in the polls. With the exposure and eventual entrance of Fred Thompson into the field, Giuliani's poll numbers began to drop. But he held on to his status as frontrunner. According to the CBS News Poll taken June 26–28, Giuliani held the lead over Thompson 34% to 21%.

In the second quarter, Giuliani revealed that he raised $17 million, first among Republicans and third overall behind Barack Obama and Hillary Clinton.

=== September: Frontrunner status ===
In September, reports surfaced of a coordinated grassroots campaign "$9.11 for Rudy", which attempted to solicit $9.11 in the form of donations. One of their supporters, Abraham Sofaer, attempted to hold a fundraiser for Giuliani during the "National House Party Night", and drew criticism. Democratic presidential candidate Chris Dodd called the theme "unconscionable, shameless and sickening." However, Giuliani's campaign spokeswoman Maria Comella stated, "These are two volunteers who acted independently of and without the knowledge of the campaign, their decision to ask individuals for that amount was an unfortunate choice."

Perhaps because of Giuliani's frontrunner status, some national leaders of the Christian right including James Dobson, Richard Viguerie, Tony Perkins and Morton Blackwell, attended a meeting of the Council for National Policy in September 2007, at the Grand America Hotel in Salt Lake City. At this meeting, they decided that they would consider supporting a third-party candidate for president if a pro-choice candidate were to win the Republican nomination. The CNP's official statement read, "If the Republican Party nominates a pro-abortion candidate, we will consider running a third-party candidate."

By the end of September 2007, most polls showed Giuliani to have more support than any of the other declared Republican candidates, with only Senator Thompson and Governor Romney showing greater support in some state polls. Specifically, state-by-state polls for the 2008 Republican nomination showed that Giuliani polled ahead of all other candidates in a majority of states including the delegate-rich states of California, New York, and Florida. A September 26, 2007 Quinnipiac poll taken in New Jersey gave the mayor a slight lead over Hillary Clinton in the traditional blue state, 45% to 44%.

=== Fall: Under attack ===
On November 9, 2007, Bernard Kerik, whom Giuliani had appointed to several top positions during his mayoralty, brought in as a partner at Giuliani Partners, and recommended for Secretary of Homeland Security, was indicted on 16 counts of tax fraud and other federal charges. Due to questions about Giuliani's judgement in promoting Kerik's career, The New York Times said that the forthcoming legal proceedings could "cast a shadow" on Giuliani's presidential campaign, while The Washington Post said the indictment "was expected to provide an opening for political rivals" of Giuliani. Giuliani said that "I made a mistake of not clearing him effectively enough. I take the responsibility for that", and defended Kerik's performance in the city positions he had held. Giuliani also declined to say whether he might one day issue a presidential pardon for Kerik. On November 13, 2007, former publisher Judith Regan, with whom Kerik had had an extramarital affair, filed a $100 million defamation lawsuit against News Corporation, the affiliate of Fox News, claiming among other things that the corporation's executives told her in 2004 to lie to federal investigators about her relationship with Kerik, in order to protect Giuliani's future presidential campaign.

These are perilous times for Rudy Giuliani

— The Wall Street Journal

In late November 2007, Politico reported that while Mayor of New York in 1999 and 2000, Giuliani had billed to obscure city agencies several tens of thousands of dollars of mayoral security expenses incurred while visiting Judith Nathan, with whom he was having an extramarital affair, in The Hamptons. Giuliani denied that he or his administration had done anything improper, and called the charges a "political hit job". Questions continued in the press not over his need for the security, but over the appearance of trying to hide the expenses in the city budget, which Giuliani aides eventually said was due to vendor payment efficiencies. Shortly thereafter, the New York Daily News reported another angle on the story, stating that Giuliani had ordered police department protection and chauffeuring services for Nathan in early 2000, before her relationship with him had even become public.

During late November and early December 2007, several stories were published in the press regarding clients of Giuliani's consultancy firm, Giuliani Partners, and his law firm, Bracewell & Giuliani. The Village Voice and others reported that Giuliani Partners had been given contracts from the Qatar Ministry of the Interior for security advice and consulting since 2005, and these contracts had been overseen by then-Minister of Religious Affairs Abdullah Bin Khalid Al-Thani, a member of Qatar's royal family who is considered sympathetic to Al Qaeda and who had sheltered future September 11 mastermind Khalid Sheikh Mohammed from the FBI in 1996. The New York Times reported that Bracewell & Giuliani had lobbied for an Ethiopian political faction opposing its government and in opposition to goals of American foreign policy. In fact, Giuliani had already stepped down as CEO and chairman of Giuliani Partners in June 2007, although this action was not disclosed publicly. On December 4, 2007, in the wake of the latest attention to the firm's client base, Giuliani Partners announced the stepping down, with Giuliani defending his work there, saying, "Everything I did at Giuliani Partners was totally legal, totally ethical. There's nothing for me to explain about. We acted honorably, decently." Giuliani maintained his equity interest in the firm.

The Nathan security billing and Giuliani client base stories dominated Giuliani's press coverage for much of a week and coincided with a significant drop in his national poll figures and a worsening of his fortunes in the first caucus and primary states. Combined with the Kerik developments, they associated an air of political-personal doubt around the candidate. The Wall Street Journal stated that "These are perilous times for Rudy Giuliani." In a lengthy interview on the nationally televised Meet the Press, Giuliani defended the security detail decisions, saying they were warranted by threat assessments at the time, and defended his refusal to release a full Giuliani Partners client list, saying every client of significance had already been pointed out in the press. Within a month after the original Nathan report, an investigation of city records by The New York Times revealed that the billing of mayoral travel-related expenses to obscure city agencies had started two years before the Nathan visits began, and totaled a hundred times more than what was spent for the Nathan visits, thus strongly suggesting that the Nathan visits "had nothing to do with any accounting legerdemain." Nevertheless, the political damage had been done.

=== Winter: A strategy in peril ===
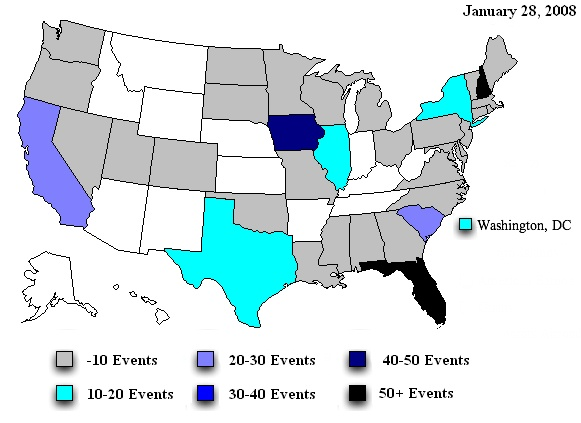
Rudy Giuliani campaign events by state

By mid-December 2007, Giuliani was keeping to his strategy of campaigning in big states such as New York, New Jersey, Florida, California, Illinois, Missouri, and other Super Duper Tuesday states, while the other contenders focused on the earlier states of Iowa, New Hampshire, and South Carolina. However, the strategy was now seen as at risk. Not only were his poll numbers in the early states falling — despite an attempt for a while to boost his standing in New Hampshire with $3 million of radio and television advertising, which ended up not having any effect — but he had lost his national lead and had fallen into statistical ties with Mike Huckabee. Most dangerously, his lead in Florida, the first state that he planned to heavily contest, was dwindling as well. Furthermore, changes in Giuliani's campaign messaging went largely unnoticed by the press, given that they were focused on Iowa and New Hampshire developments. Giuliani's woes were further symbolized when he got sick with flu-like symptoms during a campaign flight and was admitted overnight to Barnes-Jewish Hospital in St. Louis, Missouri as a precaution. Giuliani resumed limited campaigning in subsequent days; the campaign would not give precise details of tests done; Giuliani then stated it had been a "terrible headache", not flu, and a full medical report would be given after Christmas; but the health question had become an ongoing campaign story. Giuliani did indeed get a clean bill of health from his doctor on the day after Christmas, but again a minor amount of political damage had been done.

Giuliani's voter appeal continued to be hurt by the previous month's stories about his personal and business life, as well as the reduced level of civil strife in Iraq undercutting his security-based campaign messages. When the close proximity of the first contests to the holidays led to many candidates putting out Christmas videos — allowing them to keep presenting their message but in a more appropriate setting — Giuliani chose two videos which combined his policy goals with humorous asides with Santa Claus regarding fruit cakes as gifts or the vain hope that "all the presidential candidates can just get along."

== 2008 caucuses and primaries ==
=== Iowa and New Hampshire ===
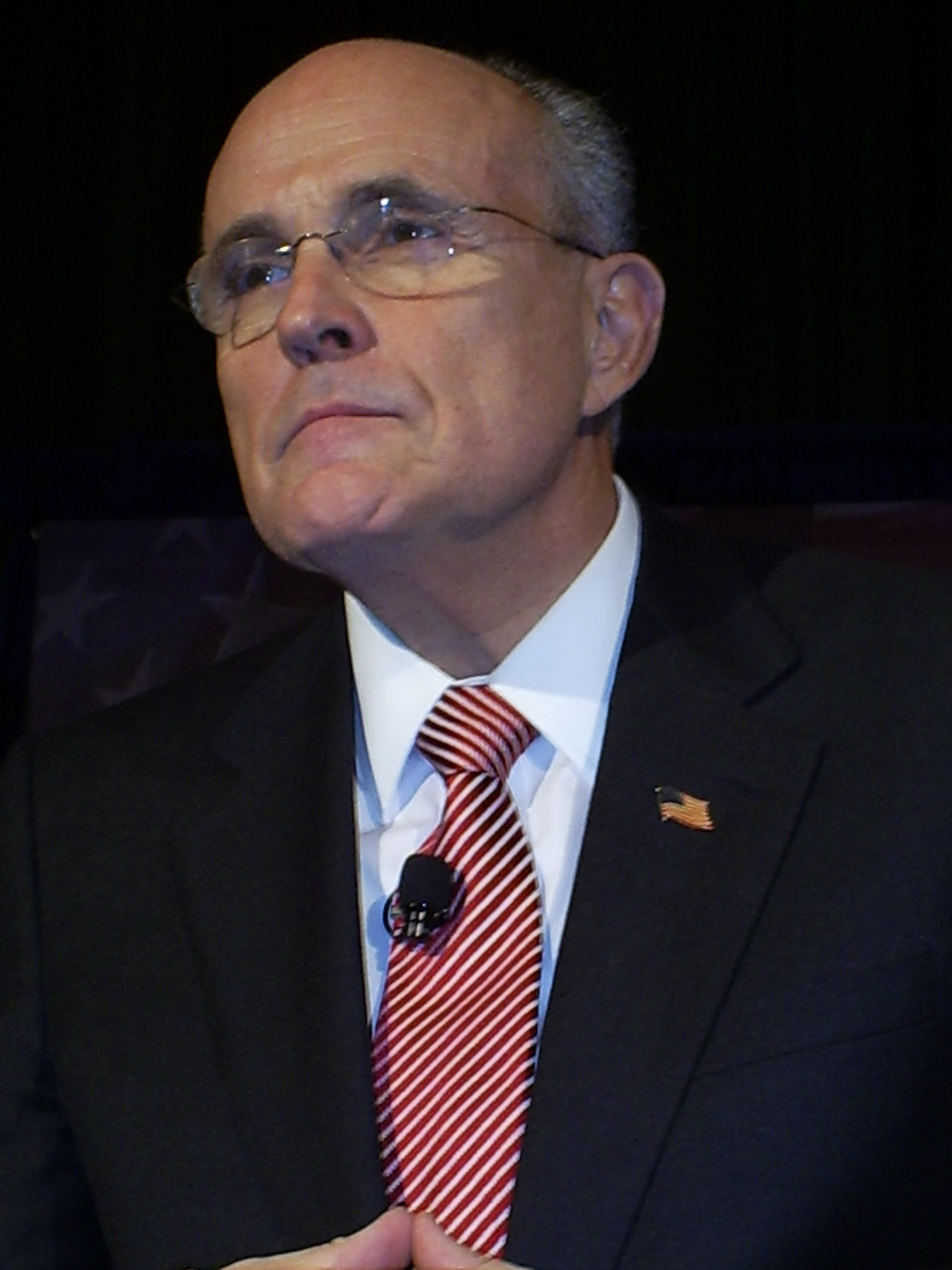
Giuliani at a campaign event in Derry, New Hampshire, on January 7, the day before the New Hampshire primary.

In the January 3 Iowa Republican caucus, in which Giuliani essentially did not compete, he finished a distant sixth out of seven candidates with 4 percent of the vote. He had been second in polls in the state as late as early October.

Giuliani did compete, off and on, in the January 8 New Hampshire primary, making the second most appearances there of any Republican after Mitt Romney and spending the third most money there after Romney and John McCain. He had been second in the polls in the state as late as the start of December, but finished fourth in the primary with 9 percent of the vote, far behind McCain and Romney and trailing as well third-place finisher Mike Huckabee.

Giuliani continued to maintain that his strategy of focusing on later, larger primaries would result in his winning the nomination. Before the New Hampshire votes had been counted, Giuliani's campaign moved to Florida in preparation for the state's January 29 primary. "I want you to come join us there and help us", he said. "And help us in Connecticut. Help us in New York. Help us in New Jersey." By January 2008, Giuliani's popularity had slipped significantly, both in the polls and media attention. Measurements by the University of Navarra indicated that throughout the month, Giuliani's amount of global media attention was a distant fourth among Republican candidates, trailing Huckabee, Romney, and McCain.

=== Michigan, Nevada, South Carolina ===
Meanwhile, Giuliani's results in the early primaries and caucuses were very low: sixth place with 3% of the vote in the Michigan primary (where he had been leading in polls as recently as mid-December), sixth place with 4% of the vote in the Nevada caucuses, and sixth place with 2% of the vote in the South Carolina primary (where he had been tied for the lead in polls as late as mid-December).

=== Florida ===
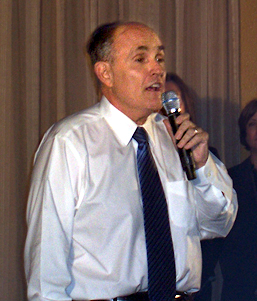
Rudy Giuliani speaking during his campaign in Florida.

Giuliani said on January 8 that Florida was "real important" to the campaign, and that they would put "almost everything" into Florida. Several senior staffers in the campaign went without their January paychecks in order to assure that more funds could be spent in the state.

A January 14, 2008, poll from Rasmussen Reports showed that Giuliani, Mike Huckabee, John McCain and Mitt Romney were all tied within the margin of error On January 23, 2008, the Miami-Herald reported that Giuliani's Florida support was in "freefall" as polls showed him fighting Huckabee (who was only campaigning part-time in the state) for third place, well behind front-runners McCain and Romney. By a January 24, 2008 poll, Giuliani was in third place in Florida with 20% of the vote, compared to 23% for John McCain and 27% for Mitt Romney.

Another blow to Giuliani was the late endorsements for McCain of Florida senator and former chairman of the Republican National Committee Mel Martinez on January 25 and the highly popular Governor of Florida, Charlie Crist, on January 26. Crist had planned to endorse Giuliani in the early autumn, and had still been expected to do so in early January. The Giuliani camp had placed much emphasis on the value of a Crist endorsement, and had focused their campaign strategies around it. They were thus visibly upset by Crist's endorsement of McCain. Whereas previously Giuliani had declared that he would campaign on regardless of the Florida results, he now was more vague. By the day before the Florida vote, a new Quinnipiac University Polling Institute final poll showed Giuliani's slide continuing down to 14 percent, 18 points behind McCain. Giuliani chartered a Boeing 727 to conduct a barnstorming tour of airports: Orlando Sanford International Airport, St. Petersburg-Clearwater International Airport, Southwest Florida International Airport (near Fort Myers), and Fort Lauderdale-Hollywood International Airport, with actor-surrogate Jon Voight along with him, but the crowds for the tarmac rallies usually struggled to reach one hundred. Giuliani's staff handed out gifts to members of the press on the plane; one reporter said that the gift seemed like a "going-away present". By that night, it was being reported that Giuliani might quit the race if he failed to pull off a surprise win there.

On January 29, 2008, Giuliani finished third in the Florida primary behind McCain and Romney.

=== Withdrawal ===
Although Giuliani hoped to win most of the necessary delegates for the nomination on Super Tuesday, February 5, late January polls by Rasmussen Reports showed that he was in fifth place in California with 11% support, and a Rasmussen Reports poll out of New Jersey showed him in second place with 27% support. One New Jersey poll had him losing a 32-point lead since October and trailing McCain there. Perhaps the biggest concern was the fact that two polls released on January 20 showed McCain with a double-digit lead in Giuliani's home state of New York. A Zogby poll showed a close race in New York, but also put McCain ahead.

Following his Florida defeat, Giuliani flew cross-country to give his withdrawal announcement on January 30 at the Ronald Reagan Presidential Library and Museum in Simi Valley, California, endorsing McCain at the same time. The endorsement was given with enthusiasm, as Giuliani and McCain were genuine friends and were allies on many political issues.

Giuliani's defeat continued a long tradition of Mayors of New York not succeeding at attempts for higher office.

== Endorsements ==
Rudy Giuliani's presidential campaign was endorsed by some notable individuals including businessmen, politicians, athletes, and actors.

List of people who endorsed Rudy Giuliani

Giuliani's endorsers included:

Organizations

- National Troopers Coalition
- United States Airport & Seaport Police
- Police Officers Association of Michigan
- New England Police Benevolent Association
- New York 10-13 Associations of America
- International Brotherhood of Police Officers Local 911

Elected officials–current(during time of election)

- Governor Rick Perry of Texas,
- Senator Kit Bond of Missouri
- Senator David Vitter of Louisiana,
- Senator Norm Coleman of Minnesota,
- Congresswoman Judy Biggert of Illinois,
- Congresswoman Mary Bono of California,
- Congressman Charles Boustany of Louisiana,
- Congressman Charlie Dent of Pennsylvania,
- Congressman David Dreier of California,
- Congressman Phil English of Pennsylvania,
- Congressman Vito Fossella of New York,
- Congressman Jim Gerlach of Pennsylvania,
- Congressman Peter King of New York,
- Congressman Jerry Lewis of California,
- Congressman Frank LoBiondo of New Jersey,
- Congresswoman Candice Miller of Michigan,
- Congressman Devin Nunes of California,
- Congressman Jon Porter of Nevada,
- Congressman George Radanovich of California,
- Congressman Dave Reichert of Washington,
- Congressman Ed Royce of California,
- Congressman Pete Sessions of Texas,
- Congressman Jim Walsh of New York,
- Congressman Jerry Weller of Illinois,
- Congresswoman Jo Ann Emerson of Missouri,
- New York Senate Majority Leader Joseph Bruno
- Missouri House Majority Leader Steven Tilley
- New York Assembly Republican Leader Jim Tedisco
- New Jersey Assembly Republican Leader Alex DeCroce
- Speaker of the Georgia House of Representatives Glenn Richardson
- Florida state senators Mike Fasano, Dennis Jones, Burt Saunders and Mike Bennett
- Mayor of Manchester, New Hampshire Frank Guinta
- Mayor of Bismarck, North Dakota John Warford
- Mayor of Boca Raton, Florida Steven L. Abrams
- Resident Commissioner Luis Fortuno of Puerto Rico,

Elected officials–former

- Former governor of Wisconsin, Secretary of Health and Human Services, and 2008 Republican presidential candidate Tommy Thompson
- Former governor of Massachusetts Paul Cellucci
- Former governor of California Pete Wilson
- Former governor of Florida Bob Martinez
- Former governor of Illinois Jim Edgar
- Former governor of Maryland Bob Ehrlich
- Former governor of Nevada Robert List
- Former Illinois attorney general Jim Ryan
- Former Florida commissioner of education Jim Horne
- Former speaker of the California State Assembly Curt Pringle, Mayor of Anaheim, California and eleven other California mayors,
- Former president of the New Jersey Senate and former acting governor John Bennett,
- Former senator Bob Kasten of Wisconsin,
- Former congressman Guy Molinari
- Former congressman Arthur Ravenel, Jr. of South Carolina,
- Former congressman Scott Klug of Wisconsin,
- Former congresswoman Anne Northup of Kentucky
- Former congressman Tom Ewing
- Former congresswoman Nancy Johnson
- Former congressman Clay Shaw
- Former congressman Jim Nussle
- Former lieutenant governor of Illinois Corinne Wood
- Former speaker of the New Hampshire House and President of the New Hampshire State Senate Stewart Lamprey
- Former state senator Cathy Stepp of Wisconsin,

Political–other

- Chairman of the New York State Republican Committee Joseph N. Mondello
- Former New York State Republican Party chairman Bill Powers
- Former chairman of the Massachusetts Republican Party Jim Rappaport
- Former chair of the New Hampshire Republican State Committee Rhona Charbonneau
- Jeb Bush, Jr., son of former governor of Florida Jeb Bush and nephew of former president George W. Bush

Government officials

- Former director of the Federal Bureau of Investigation Louis Freeh

Businesspeople

- Billionaire publisher and 1996 Republican presidential candidate Steve Forbes
- Entrepreneur and future president Donald Trump (co-endorsement with Hillary Clinton)
- Businessman Patrick L. Anderson

Religious leaders

- Televangelist Pat Robertson

Sports and entertainment

- Actor Adam Sandler
- Actor Kelsey Grammer
- Actress Bo Derek
- Actor Kevin James
- Actor Jon Voight
- Television writer and producer Joel Surnow
- Former NFL Quarterback John Elway
- NASCAR Driver Jeff Gordon
- New York Yankees Outfielder Johnny Damon

== Aftermath ==
Giuliani's run for the presidency ended with a considerable debt. Over a year later, he was still paying it back. During the first quarter of 2009, he gave his campaign $200,000 of his own money. Nevertheless, the campaign was still $2.4 million in arrears, the largest such remaining debt for any of the 2008 contenders. In addition to this considerable debt, Giuliani's "high appearance fees dropped like a stone", in the words of Mark Greenbaum of Salon, following his failure to win the nomination.

== See also ==
- 2008 Republican Party presidential primaries
- 2008 United States presidential election
- Political positions of Rudy Giuliani
