= Alan Keyes 2008 presidential campaign =

American political campaign

We Need Alan Keyes
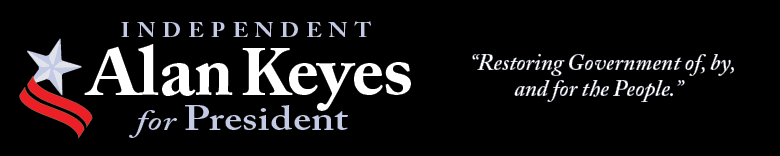
- Campaign: U.S. presidential election, 2008
- Candidate: Alan Keyes; Asst. Secretary of State; (1985–1987); Wiley Drake
- Affiliation: American Independent Party (formerly Republican Party and Constitution Party)
- Status: Lost election: November 8, 2008
- Receipts: US$60,100
- Slogan: We Need Alan Keyes

Website
- alankeyes.com (archived - November 6, 2008)

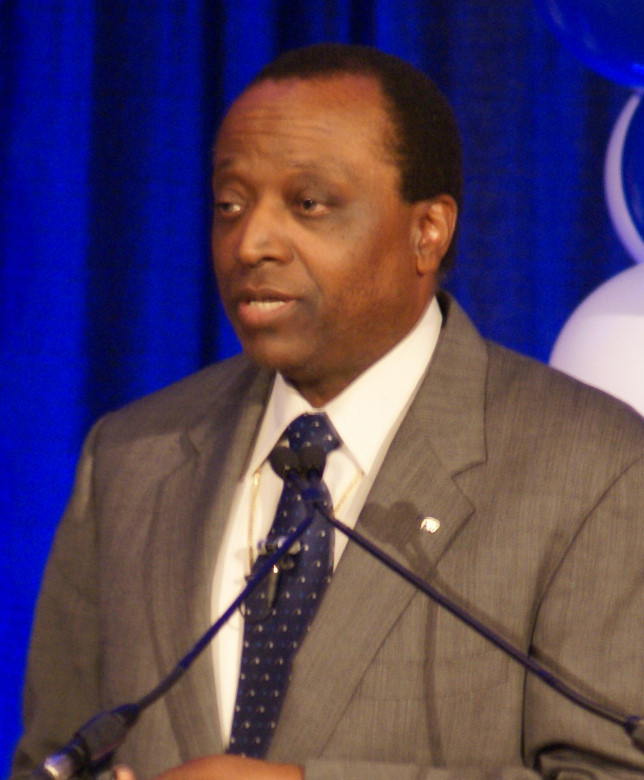
Alan Keyes

The 2008 presidential campaign of Alan Keyes, former Assistant Secretary of State for International Organization Affairs from Maryland began on September 14, 2007, after being encouraged to enter the 2008 race by the committee We Need Alan Keyes. He initially ran in the 2008 presidential primaries, against Arizona Senator John McCain, Arkansas governor Mike Huckabee, former governor of Massachusetts Mitt Romney and Texas Representative Ron Paul for his party's nomination, but after failing to gain any traction left to the Constitution Party and then to the American Independent Party.

== History ==
=== Background ===
Alan Keyes had sought the Republican nomination in 1996, when he gained 3% of the vote, and in 2000 when, despite the events of the previous campaign, he led a semi-important campaign that did well in the debates and early primaries and reestablished himself as a serious politician. However four years later Keyes ran for the Senate seat in Illinois, filling in for Jack Ryan, where his standing as a politician was lost again after running an incompetent campaign that received 27.0% of the vote against Barack Obama's 70.0%.

=== Republican primaries ===
On September 14, 2007, Alan Keyes filed a statement of candidacy officially beginning his campaign for the Republican nomination. Keyes was the last person to enter the Republican primaries coming just after Fred Thompson's announcement. While many pundits and his opponents believed that Keyes could never make a recovery from his previous failures and embarrassments, some believed that his aggressive personality and speaking ability could help him do something of importance in the 2008 primaries. At the Des Moines Register's debate despite being a minor candidate who only received two percent in polling, Keyes was able to force the moderators into giving him more time than he was allocated. By starting his campaign in late September Keyes had limited his time to campaign with the Iowa caucuses happening three months after his announcement. Keyes primarily campaigned in Iowa during the opening stages, but after three months of campaigning he received 247 votes for 0.21% of the vote. Following his defeat in Iowa Keyes spent the remainder of his campaign in Texas where he received 8,260 votes for 0.60%.

=== Constitution primary ===
Detailed map on the vote for the presidential nomination by individual state delegations

On April 15, 2008, at a press conference scheduled in Hazleton, Pennsylvania, Keyes left the Republican party and headed to the Constitution party to attempt to win their presidential primaries after failing to gain any traction in the Republican primaries. Following his exit from the Republican party Keyes stated that "I believe people deserve a choice. They certainly deserve a conservative choice -- something neither John McCain, Hillary Clinton, nor Barack Obama can offer voters. All they can offer is empty promises based on liberal track records." Despite once again entering a party's primary late in the campaign Keyes became a major candidate in the race for the Constitution party's nomination due to its smaller size, and his only major opponent was Chuck Baldwin. However, Keyes' Neocon beliefs and his jumping ship from the Republican primaries created derision between him and many of the members of the Constitution party with its founder Howard Phillips calling Keyes "the Neocon candidate". Despite losing most of the primaries Keyes became popular among members of the American Independent Party who were the California affiliation of the Constitution party.

=== General election ===
After losing both the Republican and Constitution primaries, Keyes was offered the nomination of America's Independent Party, an offshoot of the American Independent Party composed of the pro-war faction and Keyes supporters, which Keyes accepted. After being replaced on the California ballot by Keyes, Chuck Baldwin filed a lawsuit, but Keyes maintained his ballot access in California after defeating the lawsuit. Keyes chose pastor Wiley Drake as his vice presidential candidate. During the campaign Keyes appeared at an anti-illegal immigration rally held at the Democratic National Convention alongside Bob Barr. In the federal election held on November 4, 2008, Keyes received 47,694 votes nationally to finish seventh. About 86% (40,673) of the votes he received were cast in California.

=== Aftermath ===
Eights years prior Chris Jones, Keyes’ national field director, said during the New York primary that “The message is why he’s running, there are other races to be won — school boards, for example. [Those races] need to be won by people who have heard Alan Keyes speak.” In the following years all of the candidates he endorsed failed to win any elections and after receiving defeats three separate times in one presidential election, Keyes would never run for any office again.
