= Statewide opinion polling for the 2008 Democratic Party presidential primaries =

Statewide public opinion polls conducted relating to the 2008 Democratic Party presidential primaries include the following. A graphic summary of the data in map form follows. For state and territory names abbreviated in the maps in this article, see: List of US postal abbreviations.

== Polling ==
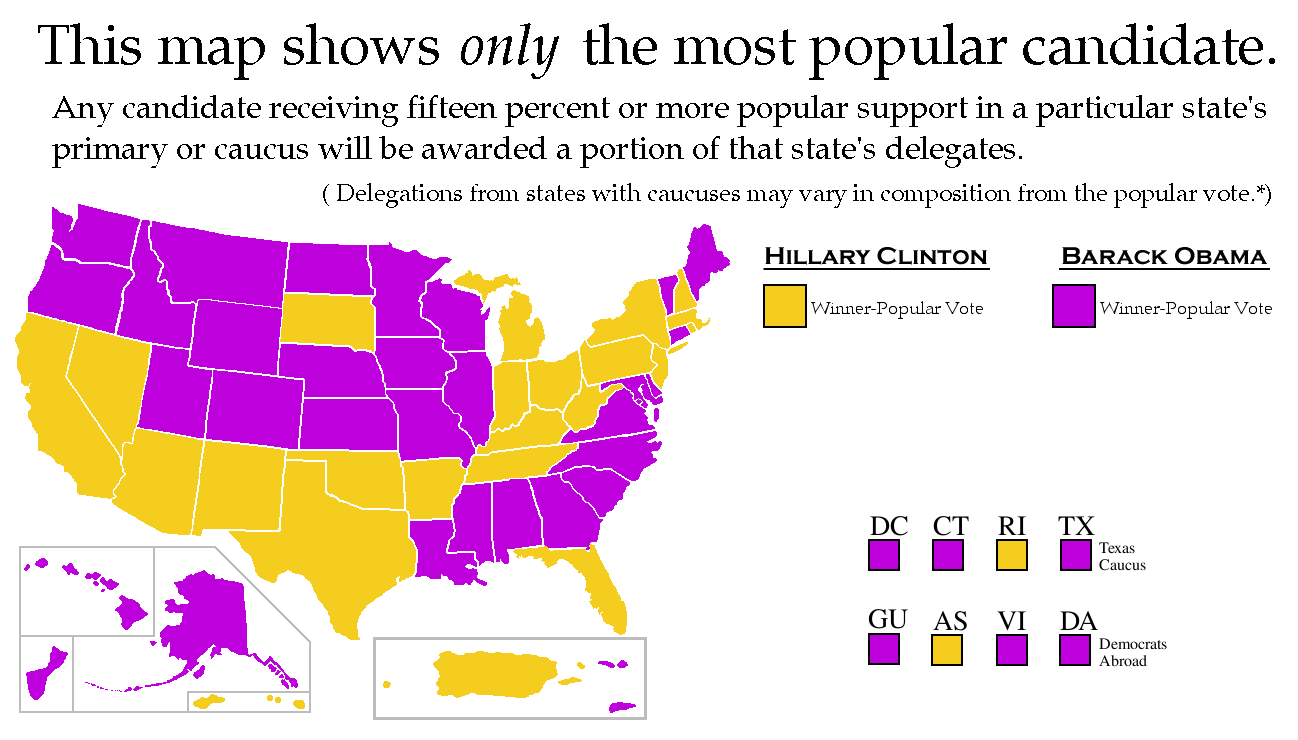
States and territories shaded with a dark color have already held a primary or caucuses; lighter colors are places that have not yet voted. *for example Clinton won the popular vote in Nevada but Obama received more delegates. For the allocation of delegates and more information see: Results of the 2008 Democratic Party presidential primaries.

== Poll summary and current pledged delegate count ==
Barack Obama received a plurality of delegates from primaries and caucuses in purple states and territories; Hillary Clinton received a plurality of delegates in yellow states and territories; both received the same amount of delegates in orange states and territories. The DNC has halved the votes of the delegates of Florida and Michigan, and slightly altered Michigan's primary results. This map shows the allocation of delegates on a per-state basis. For more information see: Results of the 2008 Democratic Party presidential primaries.

=== Delegate table and polling data ===
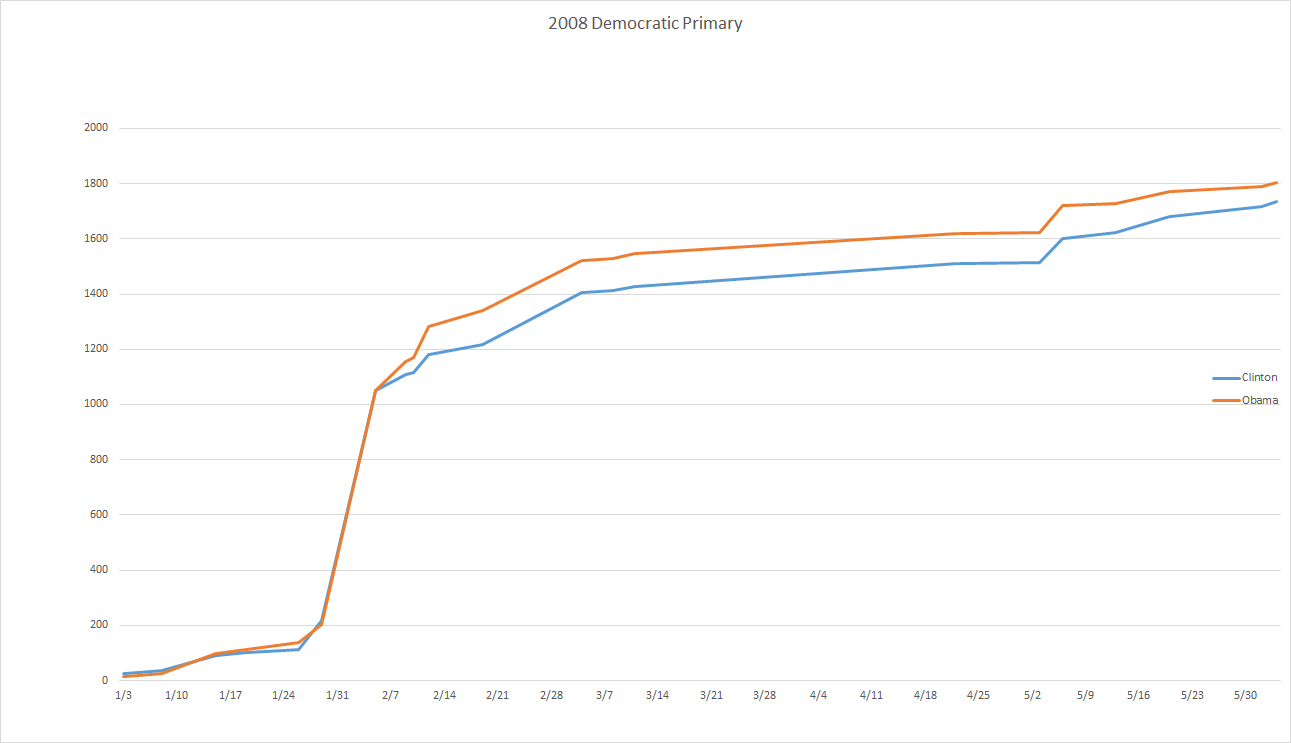
A chart plotting the delegate count in the 2008 Democratic primary election.

The following table shows a summary of the most recent polling data for each state, as well as completed primary and caucus results. Totals for withdrawn candidates have been placed in the "Uncommitted/Other" and "Other" columns. The pledged delegate vote estimates come from each state's primary or caucus article. Click on the specific election (link) column to see the sources used in those articles.

| Date | State | Delegates | Hillary Clinton | Barack Obama | Uncommitted/ other | Hillary Clinton | Barack Obama | Other |
|---|---|---|---|---|---|---|---|---|
| 2008-01-03 | Iowa | 45 | 29% | 38% | 33% | 14 | 24 | 7 |
| 2008-01-08 | New Hampshire | 22 | 39% | 36% | 24% | 9 | 9 | 4 |
| 2008-01-15 | Michigan^{1} | 128 | 55% | -† | 40% | 73 | 55 | 0 |
| 2008-01-19 | Nevada | 25 | 51% | 45% | 4% | 11 | 14 | 0 |
| 2008-01-26 | South Carolina | 45 | 27% | 55% | 18% | 12 | 25 | 8 |
| 2008-01-29 | Florida^{1} | 185 | 50% | 33% | 17% | 105 | 67 | 13 |
| 2008-02-05 | Alabama | 52 | 42% | 56% | 2% | 25 | 27 | 0 |
| 2008-02-05 | Alaska | 13 | 25% | 75% | 0% | 4 | 9 | 0 |
| 2008-02-05 | American Samoa | 3 | 57% | 43% | 0% | 2 | 1 | 0 |
| 2008-02-05 | Arizona | 56 | 51% | 42% | 7% | 31 | 25 | 0 |
| 2008-02-05 | Arkansas | 35 | 70% | 27% | 3% | 27 | 8 | 0 |
| 2008-02-05 | California | 370 | 51% | 43% | 6% | 204 | 166 | 0 |
| 2008-02-05 | Colorado | 55 | 32% | 67% | 1% | 20 | 35 | 0 |
| 2008-02-05 | Connecticut | 48 | 47% | 51% | 2% | 22 | 26 | 0 |
| 2008-02-05 | Delaware | 15 | 43% | 53% | 4% | 6 | 9 | 0 |
| 2008-02-05 | Georgia | 87 | 31% | 67% | 2% | 27 | 60 | 0 |
| 2008-02-05 | Idaho | 18 | 17% | 79% | 1% | 3 | 15 | 0 |
| 2008-02-05 | Illinois | 153 | 33% | 65% | 2% | 49 | 104 | 0 |
| 2008-02-05 | Kansas | 32 | 26% | 74% | 0% | 9 | 23 | 0 |
| 2008-02-05 | Massachusetts | 93 | 56% | 41% | 3% | 55 | 38 | 0 |
| 2008-02-05 | Minnesota | 72 | 32% | 67% | 1% | 24 | 48 | 0 |
| 2008-02-05 | Missouri | 72 | 48% | 49% | 3% | 36 | 36 | 0 |
| 2008-02-05 | New Jersey | 107 | 54% | 44% | 2% | 59 | 48 | 0 |
| 2008-02-05 | New Mexico | 26 | 49% | 48% | 3% | 14 | 12 | 0 |
| 2008-02-05 | New York | 232 | 57% | 40% | 3% | 139 | 93 | 0 |
| 2008-02-05 | North Dakota | 13 | 37% | 61% | 2% | 5 | 8 | 0 |
| 2008-02-05 | Oklahoma | 38 | 55% | 31% | 14% | 24 | 14 | 0 |
| 2008-02-05 | Tennessee | 68 | 54% | 41% | 5% | 40 | 28 | 0 |
| 2008-02-05 | Utah | 23 | 39% | 57% | 4% | 9 | 14 | 0 |
| 2008-02-09 | Louisiana | 56 | 36% | 57% | 7% | 22 | 34 | 0 |
| 2008-02-09 | Nebraska | 24 | 32% | 68% | 0% | 8 | 16 | 0 |
| 2008-02-09 | U.S. Virgin Islands | 3 | 8% | 92% | 0% | 0 | 3 | 0 |
| 2008-02-09 | Washington caucus | 78 | 31% | 68% | 1% | 26 | 52 | 0 |
| 2008-02-10 | Maine | 24 | 40% | 59% | 1% | 9 | 15 | 0 |
| 2008-02-12 | Democrats Abroad | 7 | 33% | 66% | 1% | 2.5 | 4.5 | 0 |
| 2008-02-12 | District of Columbia | 15 | 24% | 75% | 1% | 3 | 12 | 0 |
| 2008-02-12 | Maryland | 70 | 36% | 61% | 3% | 28 | 42 | 0 |
| 2008-02-12 | Virginia | 83 | 35% | 64% | 1% | 29 | 54 | 0 |
| 2008-02-19 | Hawaii | 20 | 24% | 76% | 0% | 6 | 14 | 0 |
| 2008-02-19 | Wisconsin | 74 | 41% | 58% | 1% | 32 | 42 | 0 |
| 2008-03-04 | Ohio | 141 | 53% | 45% | 2% | 74 | 67 | 0 |
| 2008-03-04 | Rhode Island | 21 | 58% | 40% | 2% | 13 | 8 | 0 |
| 2008-03-04 | Texas primary | 126 | 51% | 47% | 2% | 65 | 61 | 0 |
| 2008-03-04 | Texas caucus | 67 | 44% | 56% | 0% | 29 | 38 | 0 |
| 2008-03-04 | Vermont | 15 | 39% | 59% | 2% | 6 | 9 | 0 |
| 2008-03-08 | Wyoming | 12 | 38% | 61% | 1% | 5 | 7 | 0 |
| 2008-03-11 | Mississippi | 33 | 37% | 61% | 2% | 14 | 19 | 0 |
| 2008-04-22 | Pennsylvania | 158 | 55% | 45% | 0% | 85 | 73 | 0 |
| 2008-05-03 | Guam | 4 | 50% | 50% | 0% | 2 | 2 | 0 |
| 2008-05-06 | Indiana | 72 | 51% | 49% | 0% | 38 | 34 | 0 |
| 2008-05-06 | North Carolina | 115 | 42% | 56% | 2% | 50 | 65 | 0 |
| 2008-05-13 | West Virginia | 28 | 67% | 26% | 7% | 20 | 8 | 0 |
| 2008-05-20 | Kentucky | 51 | 65% | 30% | 5% | 37 | 14 | 0 |
| 2008-05-20 | Oregon | 52 | 41% | 58% | 1% | 21 | 31 | 0 |
| 2008-06-01 | Puerto Rico | 55 | 68% | 32% | 1% | 38 | 17 | 0 |
| 2008-06-03 | Montana | 16 | 41% | 56% | 3% | 7 | 9 | |
| 2008-06-03 | South Dakota | 15 | 55% | 45% | 0% | 9 | 6 | |
| Total | | 3,545 | | | | 1,736.5 | 1,797.5 | 32 |

† Barack Obama was not on the ballot in Michigan.

1. On 24 August, the DNC gave Florida and Michigan full voting rights.

== See also ==
- Nationwide opinion polling for the Democratic Party 2008 presidential primaries
- Statewide opinion polling for the Republican Party presidential primaries, 2008
