= 2008 United States presidential election in Missouri =

- November 4, 2008
- Turnout: 69.40% (▲4.3 pp)

Nominee	John McCain	Barack Obama
Party	Republican	Democratic
Home state	Arizona	Illinois
Running mate	Sarah Palin	Joe Biden
Electoral vote	11	0
Popular vote	1,445,814	1,441,911
Percentage	49.43%	49.29%

McCain
40–50%
50–60%
60–70%
70–80%
80–90%
Obama
40–50%
50–60%
60–70%
70–80%
80–90%
90–100%
Tie/No Data
President before election
George W. Bush
Republican
Elected President
Barack Obama
Democratic

The 2008 United States presidential election in Missouri was held on November 4, 2008, and was part of the 2008 United States presidential election, which took place throughout all 50 states and D.C. Voters chose 11 representatives, or electors to the Electoral College, who voted for president and vice president.

Missouri was won by Republican nominee John McCain by 3,903 votes, a 0.14% margin of victory. On election day, Missouri was the closest state in 2008, with most news organizations not calling the state until two weeks after the election. A high turnout of voters in the GOP strongholds of Greene County (Springfield) and St. Charles County, combined with Democrat Barack Obama's lackluster performance in the more rural parts of the state, gave the edge to McCain. Since the margin of victory was less than 1%, Obama could have legally ordered a recount at no expense to himself, but he ultimately chose not to do so, as Missouri's 11 electoral votes were inconsequential to his win and a recount would have been unlikely to change the outcome.

Prior to the election, most news organizations considered Missouri a toss-up, or a swing state. Polling showed a dead heat and the state was seriously contested with both candidates spending heavily on campaign stops and advertising. Obama became the first Democrat to ever win the presidency without carrying Missouri, and McCain the first Republican to carry Missouri without winning the presidency.

Combined with the state's swing to the right in 2000 and 2004 and the further bleeding of Democratic support in white, rural areas, this would be the last time when Missouri was seriously contested and considered to be a swing/bellwether state. The state continued moving deeper and safer into the Republican side four years later and onward, and as such, this is the most recent election when the Republican candidate won less than 50% of the state's popular vote. As of 2024, this is the last time that Iron, Jefferson, Washington, Ste. Genevieve, and Buchanan Counties voted for the Democratic candidate. Despite losing, Obama's 1,441,911 votes are the most received by a Democratic presidential candidate in the state's history.

== Primaries ==
- 2008 Missouri Democratic presidential primary
- 2008 Missouri Republican presidential primary

== Campaign ==
With the advent of the September financial crisis, Obama began to look viable. John McCain's lead diminished and then disappeared; for several weeks Obama even led Missouri polls. Obama started visiting Republican-leaning states, including Missouri. In one of the more memorable trips of the campaign, he drew crowds of 75,000 at Kansas City and 100,000 at St. Louis. However, John McCain's campaign managed to close the gap and most polls showed a dead tie on and before Election Day.

Although seven of Missouri's eight neighboring states offered the option of early voting, the option was not available in Missouri. Election results must go through a certification process before they are official; local election officials had until November 18 to verify their results and process the provisional ballots cast throughout Missouri.

=== Predictions ===
There were 16 news organizations who made state-by-state predictions of the election. Here are their last predictions before election day:

Source	Ranking
D.C. Political Report	Likely R
Cook Political Report	Toss-up
The Takeaway	Toss-up
Electoral-vote.com	Lean R
Washington Post	Lean R
Politico	Lean R
RealClearPolitics	Toss-up
FiveThirtyEight	Lean R
CQ Politics	Toss-up
The New York Times	Toss-up
CNN	Toss-up
NPR	Lean R
MSNBC	Toss-up
Fox News	Toss-up
Associated Press	Toss-up
Rasmussen Reports	Toss-up

=== Polling ===
Throughout the general election, McCain consistently won the state's pre-election polls, even reaching above 50% in some of them. In the fall campaign, polls were back and forth with both. In the last few weeks when Obama was having the momentum, the final 5 polls taken in the state were all a tie.

Here are the final polls in the state:

Poll Source	Date administered	Democrat	%	Republican	%	Lead Margin
Reuters/Zogby	October 31- November 3, 2008	Barack Obama	48.8%	John McCain	48.8%	0
Rasmussen Reports/ Fox News	November 2, 2008	Barack Obama	49%	John McCain	49%	0
Public Policy Polling	October 31 – November 2, 2008	Barack Obama	49.4%	John McCain	48.6%	0.8
Reuters/Zogby	October 30- November 2, 2008	Barack Obama	47.4%	John McCain	45.7%	1.7
Survey USA	October 30 – November 2, 2008	Barack Obama	48%	John McCain	48%	0

=== Fundraising ===
John McCain raised a total of $2,904,162 in the state. Barack Obama raised $4,999,812.

=== Advertising and visits ===
Obama and his interest groups spent $11,323,706. McCain and his interest groups spent $9,428,559.

The Democratic ticket visited the state 13 times throughout the general election. The Republican ticket visited here 14 times.

McCain's Visits:

- June 18: Springfield
- July 15: St. Louis
- July 17: Kansas City
- July 30: Kansas City
- August 31: St. Louis
- October 8: Vice presidential nominee Sarah Palin campaigned in Cape Girardeau at the Show-Me Center on the campus of Southeast Missouri State University in an effort to reach out to the base of the GOP.

Obama's Visits:

- May 13: During the course of the ongoing Democratic presidential primary, Obama visited Thorngate factory in Cape Girardeau in Southeast Missouri alongside U.S. Senator Claire McCaskill to speak to a group of factory workers. These blue-collar, working-class whites were a voting bloc that strongly backed Hillary Clinton throughout the primary.
- June 9 – 10: St. Louis
- June 30: Independence
- July 5: St. Louis
- July 7: St. Louis (unscheduled; plane maintenance)
- July 30: Springfield, Rolla, Union
- August 25, 26: Kansas City
- October 18: St. Louis
- October 30: Columbia
- November 1: Springfield

== Analysis ==
For the better part of a century, Missouri was considered to be the nation's prime bellwether state. From 1904 to 2004, Missouri voted for the winner in every presidential election except 1956, when the state narrowly voted for Democrat Adlai Stevenson of neighboring Illinois over incumbent Republican President Dwight D. Eisenhower. In recent years, however, it has trended Republican. Although Bill Clinton of neighboring Arkansas won the state with ease during both of his elections in 1992 and 1996, Al Gore and John Kerry considered Missouri a lost cause and did not campaign much there. Despite being from neighboring Illinois, Obama too initially put the state as a secondary concern in relation to other swing states such as Ohio and Virginia where he thought he had a better chance. As his lead diminished in the summer months, he and McCain moved the campaign to more Democratic-friendly states, as McCain maintained a comfortable polling lead in Missouri. Similar hypothetical general match-up polls taken between McCain and Hillary Clinton, however, showed Clinton always leading in Missouri.

A record 2.9 million Missourians, or 69% of eligible voters, cast their ballots in the general election, about 200,000 more than the previous record in the 2004 elections. On Election Day, McCain clung to a tiny lead, with absentee and provisional ballots yet to be counted. By November 19, McCain led Obama by 1,445,813–1,441,910 votes, or approximately 0.14% of the total popular vote in Missouri. CNN called the state for McCain that day. The 2008 election was only the second time in 104 years that it had not voted for the winner of the general election. Missouri was, however, the closest state of the 2008 election.

The Democratic base of Missouri rests in its two largest cities in the west and east – Kansas City and St. Louis, respectively. Obama did extremely well here, winning 83.55% of the vote in St. Louis City and 78.4% in Kansas City. Obama was already a familiar face to St. Louis-area voters, since the St. Louis metro area spills into Illinois. McCain narrowly won the areas in Jackson County outside Kansas City with 49.9% to Obama's 48.8%, but Obama carried the county with 62.14% of the vote due to his strong performance in Kansas City. These two cities had contributed to close margins for elections in Missouri, and 2008 was no different, as these cities frequently create large margins for Democrats.

One of the most important counties in the state for either candidate in Missouri elections is St. Louis County. The county has a population of more than 1 million, and had delivered victories for Democrats since 1992, but by relatively small margins of 6 points in 2000 and 9 points in 2004. Obama outperformed both Gore and Kerry, delivering a 20-point margin for Obama. St. Louis County (where he also won 59.50% of the vote), combined with his landslide wins in Kansas City and St. Louis gave him a 300,000 margin over McCain.

St. Louis County had been growing increasingly more of a Democratic stronghold, the last time a Republican was able to win the county was in 1988. As reflected nationally, suburban counties practiced a moderate form of conservatism, and had rejected the growing social conservatism of the Republican party. The county, the most affluent in the state, is largely suburban with a racially diverse population. His victory was the strongest performance for a Democrat in the county since 1964. Obama was also able to carry Boone County, home to the large college town of Columbia (Missouri's fifth-largest city and home of the state's flagship University of Missouri campus), and Jefferson County, which consists of the southern St. Louis suburbs such as Arnold and Festus. George W. Bush narrowly won Jefferson County in 2004 over John Kerry.

However, Obama was unable to substantially improve on Kerry's performance in rural Missouri, which is largely responsible for Missouri's Republican tilt. During the 2008 Missouri Democratic Primary, every rural county in Missouri (with the exception of Nodaway County, home of Northwest Missouri State University in Maryville in Northwestern Missouri), strongly backed Hillary Clinton, often by more than two-to-one margins. Many, if not all, of these counties that Clinton won in the Missouri Primary ended up voting for McCain in the general election. A number of these counties are ancestrally Democratic. However, these counties are very similar in character to Yellow Dog Democrat areas in neighboring Tennessee, Arkansas and Oklahoma. The Democrats in these areas are nowhere near as liberal as their counterparts in St. Louis and Kansas City, and much like their counterparts in neighboring Tennessee and Arkansas, had become increasingly willing to support Republicans at the national level.

Obama lost by an almost two-to-one margin in Southwest Missouri, a Republican stronghold for the better part of a century. This region is entrenched in the Bible Belt and embedded with deep pockets of social conservatives that includes Springfield and Joplin. Even Bill Clinton could not win Southwest Missouri in 1992 despite the fact that he won the state by double digits. Rural Northern Missouri voted against Obama by a three-to-two margin; this region warmly supported Bill Clinton in both of his bids. Obama also lost much of rural Southeast Missouri. Unlike Northern and Southwest Missouri, Southeast Missouri, which strongly backed Bill Clinton both times, is more Democratic at the local and state levels. The region takes in the Lead Belt, the Bootheel and the Ozark Plateau and includes the largest city of Cape Girardeau, a booming college town but also a conservative, upper-middle class community that votes overwhelmingly Republican. Southeast Missouri is socially conservative but economically liberal, consistently electing Democrats at the local and state levels. While Obama ran even in the area southwest of St. Louis, he did worse than John Kerry in the Bootheel. Obama was, however, able to pick up two counties in Southeast Missouri: Washington County (by a margin of five votes) and Iron County. Both counties are predominantly rural and White but are some of the most impoverished counties in the state that are controlled by Democrats at the local and state levels. Both counties gave Hillary Clinton over 70% of the vote in the Missouri Primary as well.

Obama was allowed to request a recount under state law since preliminary results showed a difference of less than 1% of the votes. The request would have had to be granted by the state. However, since Obama already won the election and Missouri would not have affected the outcome, he ultimately did not request one. As of 2024, this is the closest a Northern Democrat has come to winning Missouri since John F. Kennedy of Massachusetts did so in 1960, as the previous three Democratic presidential candidates to win the state were all from the South (Lyndon B. Johnson of Texas, Jimmy Carter of Georgia, and Bill Clinton of Arkansas). This was the first presidential election that a Democrat won without winning the state of Missouri, a feat Obama would repeat in 2012, as well as his former running mate Joe Biden in 2020.

During the same election, Democratic Attorney General Jay Nixon defeated U.S. Representative Kenny Hulshof in a landslide for the Governor's Mansion. Incumbent Republican Governor Matt Blunt did not seek a second term. Nixon performed extremely well in rural Missouri and clinched 58.40% of the total statewide vote compared to Hulshof's 39.49% to become Governor of Missouri. Republicans were, however, able to hold on to the U.S. House seat in Missouri's 9th Congressional District that was vacated by Hulshof in his unsuccessful gubernatorial bid. Republican Blaine Luetkemeyer narrowly defeated Democrat Judy Baker by less than 3 percentage points, in large part due to McCain winning it by 11 points. At the state level, Democrats picked up three seats in the Missouri House of Representatives but Republicans expanded their majority in the Missouri Senate, picking up three seats here. Furthermore, upon the 2008 election, Democrats controlled all statewide offices but one; Lieutenant Governor Peter Kinder was the sole Republican. Democrats held on to the office of Attorney General that was vacated by Governor-elect Nixon; Democrat Chris Koster defeated Republican Mike Gibbons 52.83% to 47.17%. Democrats also picked up the office of State Treasurer that was vacated by Republican Sarah Steelman in her unsuccessful bid for the GOP gubernatorial nomination. Democrat Clint Zweifel defeated Republican Brad Lager 50.47% to 47.14%.

== Results ==
2008 United States presidential election in Missouri
Party	Candidate	Running mate	Votes	Percentage	Electoral votes
Republican	John McCain	Sarah Palin	1,445,814	49.43%	11
Democratic	Barack Obama	Joe Biden	1,441,911	49.29%	0
Independent	Ralph Nader	Matt Gonzalez	17,813	0.61%	0
Libertarian	Bob Barr	Wayne Allyn Root	11,386	0.39%	0
Constitution	Chuck Baldwin	Darrell Castle	8,201	0.28%	0
Green (write-in)	Cynthia McKinney	Rosa Clemente	80	0.00%	0
Totals			2,925,205	100.00%	11
Voter turnout (Voting age population)					66.1%

=== By county ===
County	John McCain Republican		Barack Obama Democratic		Various candidates Other parties		Margin		Total
County	#	%	#	%	#	%	#	%	Total
Adair	5,891	49.63%	5,735	48.31%	245	2.06%	156	1.32%	11,871
Andrew	5,279	60.06%	3,345	38.05%	166	1.89%	1,934	22.01%	8,790
Atchison	1,936	65.05%	1,000	33.60%	40	1.35%	936	31.45%	2,976
Audrain	6,167	57.20%	4,434	41.13%	180	1.67%	1,733	16.07%	10,781
Barry	9,758	66.63%	4,630	31.62%	256	1.75%	5,128	35.01%	14,644
Barton	4,414	74.21%	1,455	24.46%	79	1.33%	2,959	49.75%	5,948
Bates	4,833	58.35%	3,271	39.49%	179	2.16%	1,562	18.86%	8,283
Benton	5,759	59.92%	3,629	37.76%	223	2.32%	2,130	22.16%	9,611
Bollinger	3,972	68.67%	1,690	29.22%	122	2.11%	2,282	39.45%	5,784
Boone	36,849	43.22%	47,062	55.20%	1,340	1.58%	-10,213	-11.98%	85,251
Buchanan	19,110	48.68%	19,164	48.81%	986	2.51%	-54	-0.13%	39,260
Butler	11,805	68.09%	5,316	30.66%	217	1.25%	6,489	37.43%	17,338
Caldwell	2,654	58.15%	1,814	39.75%	96	2.10%	840	18.40%	4,564
Callaway	11,389	58.81%	7,580	39.14%	397	2.05%	3,809	19.67%	19,366
Camden	14,074	63.40%	7,773	35.02%	350	1.58%	6,301	28.38%	22,197
Cape Girardeau	24,768	66.14%	12,208	32.60%	470	1.26%	12,560	33.54%	37,446
Carroll	2,955	65.12%	1,535	33.83%	48	1.05%	1,420	31.29%	4,538
Carter	1,840	63.49%	984	33.95%	74	2.56%	856	29.54%	2,898
Cass	29,695	58.99%	19,844	39.42%	802	1.59%	9,851	19.57%	50,341
Cedar	4,194	66.01%	2,060	32.42%	100	1.57%	2,134	33.59%	6,354
Chariton	2,339	55.51%	1,799	42.69%	76	1.80%	540	12.82%	4,214
Christian	25,382	67.08%	11,883	31.41%	572	1.51%	13,499	35.67%	37,837
Clark	1,782	51.56%	1,572	45.49%	192	2.95%	210	6.07%	3,456
Clay	54,516	49.55%	53,761	48.86%	1,748	1.59%	755	0.69%	110,025
Clinton	5,709	54.61%	4,545	43.48%	200	1.91%	1,164	11.13%	10,454
Cole	24,385	62.79%	13,959	35.95%	490	1.26%	10,426	26.84%	38,834
Cooper	4,902	61.08%	2,996	37.33%	128	1.59%	1,906	23.75%	8,026
Crawford	6,007	59.56%	3,911	38.78%	167	1.66%	2,096	20.78%	10,085
Dade	2,864	69.65%	1,184	28.79%	64	1.56%	1,680	40.86%	4,112
Dallas	4,895	63.71%	2,656	34.57%	132	1.72%	2,239	29.14%	7,683
Daviess	2,263	59.77%	1,400	36.98%	123	3.25%	863	22.79%	3,786
DeKalb	2,889	61.29%	1,692	35.89%	133	2.82%	1,197	25.40%	4,714
Dent	4,655	67.78%	2,056	29.94%	157	2.28%	2,599	37.84%	6,868
Douglas	4,405	65.63%	2,140	31.88%	167	2.49%	2,265	33.75%	6,712
Dunklin	7,044	59.88%	4,540	38.59%	180	1.53%	2,504	21.29%	11,764
Franklin	27,355	55.31%	21,256	42.98%	847	1.71%	6,099	12.33%	49,458
Gasconade	4,763	61.29%	2,899	37.31%	109	1.40%	1,864	23.98%	7,771
Gentry	1,964	59.66%	1,235	37.52%	93	2.82%	729	22.14%	3,292
Greene	77,683	57.06%	56,181	41.26%	2,283	1.68%	21,502	15.80%	136,147
Grundy	3,006	63.42%	1,580	33.33%	154	3.25%	1,426	30.09%	4,740
Harrison	2,512	64.16%	1,287	32.87%	116	2.97%	1,225	31.29%	3,915
Henry	6,095	54.62%	4,869	43.63%	195	1.75%	1,226	10.99%	11,159
Hickory	2,850	55.72%	2,171	42.44%	94	1.84%	679	13.28%	5,115
Holt	1,794	68.14%	802	30.46%	37	1.40%	992	37.68%	2,633
Howard	2,708	55.78%	2,036	41.94%	111	2.28%	672	13.84%	4,855
Howell	10,982	64.49%	5,736	33.68%	311	1.83%	5,246	30.81%	17,029
Iron	2,090	47.35%	2,213	50.14%	111	2.51%	-123	-2.79%	4,414
Jackson	124,687	36.75%	210,824	62.14%	3,755	1.11%	-86,137	-25.39%	339,266
Jasper	31,667	65.67%	15,730	32.62%	822	1.71%	15,937	33.05%	48,219
Jefferson	50,804	47.91%	53,467	50.42%	1,779	1.67%	-2,663	-2.51%	106,050
Johnson	12,183	55.18%	9,480	42.93%	417	1.89%	2,703	12.25%	22,080
Knox	1,212	59.73%	759	37.41%	58	2.86%	453	22.32%	2,029
Laclede	10,875	66.40%	5,218	31.86%	286	1.74%	5,657	34.54%	16,379
Lafayette	9,442	56.88%	6,902	41.58%	256	1.54%	2,540	15.30%	16,600
Lawrence	11,263	67.50%	5,097	30.55%	325	1.95%	6,166	36.95%	16,685
Lewis	2,594	57.62%	1,837	40.80%	71	1.58%	757	16.82%	4,502
Lincoln	12,924	54.72%	10,234	43.33%	461	1.95%	2,690	11.39%	23,619
Linn	3,140	52.94%	2,638	44.48%	153	2.58%	502	8.46%	5,931
Livingston	3,993	60.94%	2,435	37.16%	124	1.90%	1,558	23.78%	6,552
Macon	4,586	61.36%	2,784	37.25%	104	1.39%	1,802	24.11%	7,474
Madison	2,897	57.62%	2,042	40.61%	89	1.77%	855	17.01%	5,028
Maries	2,853	62.58%	1,599	35.07%	107	2.35%	1,254	27.51%	4,559
Marion	7,705	61.38%	4,703	37.47%	145	1.15%	3,002	23.91%	12,553
McDonald	5,499	67.60%	2,454	30.17%	182	2.23%	3,045	37.43%	8,135
Mercer	1,169	66.88%	519	29.69%	60	3.43%	650	37.19%	1,748
Miller	7,797	67.43%	3,553	30.73%	213	1.84%	4,244	36.70%	11,563
Mississippi	3,034	56.65%	2,247	41.95%	75	1.40%	787	14.70%	5,356
Moniteau	4,467	67.02%	2,084	31.27%	114	1.71%	2,383	35.75%	6,665
Monroe	2,533	58.72%	1,703	39.48%	78	1.81%	830	19.24%	4,314
Montgomery	3,428	58.54%	2,347	40.08%	81	1.38%	1,081	18.46%	5,856
Morgan	5,451	59.58%	3,565	38.97%	133	1.45%	1,886	20.61%	9,149
New Madrid	4,593	56.76%	3,370	41.65%	129	1.59%	1,223	15.11%	8,092
Newton	17,637	69.42%	7,450	29.32%	319	1.26%	10,187	40.10%	25,406
Nodaway	5,568	54.49%	4,493	43.97%	158	1.54%	1,075	10.52%	10,219
Oregon	2,652	57.77%	1,811	39.45%	128	2.78%	841	18.32%	4,591
Osage	5,062	71.51%	1,907	26.94%	110	1.55%	3,155	44.57%	7,079
Ozark	2,918	62.27%	1,661	35.45%	107	2.28%	1,257	26.82%	4,686
Pemiscot	3,954	56.11%	3,029	42.98%	64	0.91%	925	13.13%	7,047
Perry	5,527	63.92%	3,005	34.75%	115	1.33%	2,522	29.17%	8,647
Pettis	11,018	60.32%	6,932	37.95%	315	1.73%	4,086	22.37%	18,265
Phelps	11,706	59.96%	7,394	37.87%	424	2.17%	4,312	22.09%	19,524
Pike	4,268	53.97%	3,487	44.09%	153	1.94%	781	9.88%	7,908
Platte	24,460	52.44%	21,459	46.01%	721	1.55%	3,001	6.43%	46,640
Polk	8,956	65.39%	4,553	33.24%	188	1.37%	4,403	32.15%	13,697
Pulaski	9,552	63.68%	5,249	34.99%	199	1.33%	4,303	28.69%	15,000
Putnam	1,591	68.02%	695	29.71%	53	2.27%	896	38.31%	2,339
Ralls	2,987	58.75%	2,041	40.15%	56	1.10%	946	18.60%	5,084
Randolph	6,457	60.59%	3,984	37.39%	215	2.02%	2,473	23.20%	10,656
Ray	5,593	50.60%	5,241	47.42%	219	1.98%	352	3.18%	11,053
Reynolds	1,782	54.21%	1,418	43.14%	87	2.65%	364	11.07%	3,287
Ripley	3,407	63.53%	1,795	33.47%	161	3.00%	1,612	30.06%	5,363
Saline	4,962	50.39%	4,712	47.85%	174	1.76%	250	2.54%	9,848
Schuyler	1,139	57.44%	775	39.08%	69	3.48%	364	18.36%	1,983
Scotland	1,249	59.53%	793	37.80%	56	2.67%	456	21.73%	2,098
Scott	11,563	63.95%	6,258	34.61%	261	1.44%	5,305	29.34%	18,082
Shannon	2,075	54.06%	1,637	42.65%	126	3.29%	438	11.41%	3,838
Shelby	2,166	65.32%	1,114	33.59%	36	1.09%	1,052	31.73%	3,316
St. Charles	102,550	54.27%	84,183	44.55%	2,224	1.18%	18,367	9.72%	188,957
St. Clair	2,981	59.76%	1,886	37.81%	121	2.43%	1,095	21.95%	4,988
St. Francois	12,660	51.57%	11,540	47.01%	350	1.42%	1,120	4.56%	24,550
St. Louis	221,705	39.60%	333,123	59.50%	5,026	0.90%	-111,418	-19.90%	559,854
St. Louis City	24,662	15.50%	132,925	83.55%	1,517	0.95%	-108,263	-68.05%	159,104
Ste. Genevieve	3,732	42.29%	4,979	56.42%	114	1.29%	-1,247	-14.13%	8,825
Stoddard	9,172	69.16%	3,899	29.40%	191	1.44%	5,273	39.76%	13,262
Stone	11,147	67.78%	5,029	30.58%	269	1.64%	6,118	37.20%	16,445
Sullivan	1,607	56.01%	1,173	40.89%	89	3.10%	434	15.12%	2,869
Taney	14,736	67.78%	6,683	30.74%	322	1.48%	8,053	37.04%	21,741
Texas	7,215	66.49%	3,410	31.43%	226	2.08%	3,805	35.06%	10,851
Vernon	5,334	60.08%	3,381	38.08%	163	1.84%	1,953	22.00%	8,878
Warren	8,675	55.69%	6,705	43.05%	196	1.26%	1,970	12.64%	15,576
Washington	4,706	48.95%	4,711	49.00%	197	2.05%	-5	-0.05%	9,614
Wayne	3,784	61.49%	2,243	36.45%	127	2.06%	1,541	25.04%	6,154
Webster	10,431	63.77%	5,685	34.76%	240	1.47%	4,746	29.01%	16,356
Worth	707	60.22%	427	36.37%	40	3.41%	280	23.85%	1,174
Wright	5,784	67.94%	2,557	30.03%	173	2.03%	3,227	37.91%	8,514
Totals	1,445,814	49.36%	1,441,911	49.23%	41,386	1.41%	3,903	0.13%	2,929,111

Counties that flipped from Republican to Democratic

- Boone (largest city: Columbia)
- Buchanan (largest city: St. Joseph)
- Iron (largest city: Ironton)
- Jefferson (largest city: Arnold)
- Washington (largest city: Potosi)

=== By congressional district ===
McCain carried six of the state's nine congressional districts, including one district held by a Democrat.

District	McCain	Obama	Representative
1st	19.38%	79.70%	William Lacy Clay, Jr.
2nd	54.98%	44.04%	Todd Akin
3rd	39.06%	59.50%	Russ Carnahan
4th	60.58%	37.87%	Ike Skelton
5th	35.45%	63.47%	Emanuel Cleaver
6th	53.58%	44.67%	Sam Graves
7th	63.07%	35.39%	Roy Blunt
8th	61.92%	36.42%	Jo Ann Emerson
9th	54.77%	43.66%	Kenny Hulshof (110th Congress)
9th	54.77%	43.66%	Blaine Luetkemeyer (111th Congress)

== Electors ==
Technically the voters of Missouri cast their ballots for electors: representatives to the Electoral College. Missouri is allocated 11 electors because it has 9 congressional districts and 2 senators. All candidates who appear on the ballot or qualify to receive write-in votes must submit a list of 11 electors, who pledge to vote for their candidate and his or her running mate. Whoever wins the majority of votes in the state is awarded all 11 electoral votes. Their chosen electors then vote for president and vice president. Although electors are pledged to their candidate and running mate, they are not obligated to vote for them. An elector who votes for someone other than his or her candidate is known as a faithless elector.

The electors of each state and the District of Columbia met on December 15, 2008, to cast their votes for president and vice president. The Electoral College itself never meets as one body. Instead the electors from each state and the District of Columbia met in their respective capitols.

The following were the members of the Electoral College from the state. All 11 were pledged to John McCain and Sarah Palin:

1. Willis Corbett
2. Scott Dickenson
3. Robert Haul
4. Ronny Margason
5. Cathy Owens
6. Ron Muck
7. Gene Hall
8. R. Mellene Schudy
9. Nadine Thurman
10. Paul Nahon
11. Jerry Dowell

== See also ==
- United States presidential elections in Missouri
