= 2008 North Dakota Republican presidential caucuses =

- February 5, 2008

26 delegates to the Republican National Convention (23 pledged, 3 unpledged) The number of pledged delegates received is determined by the popular vote
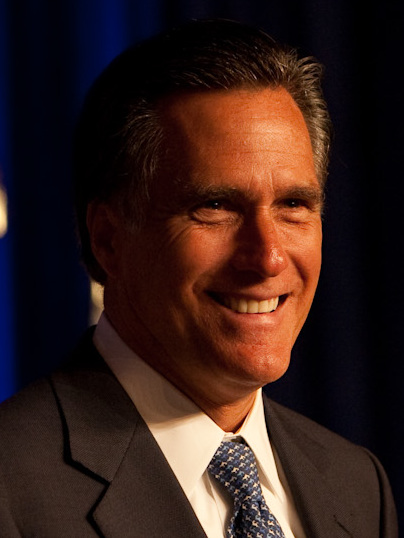

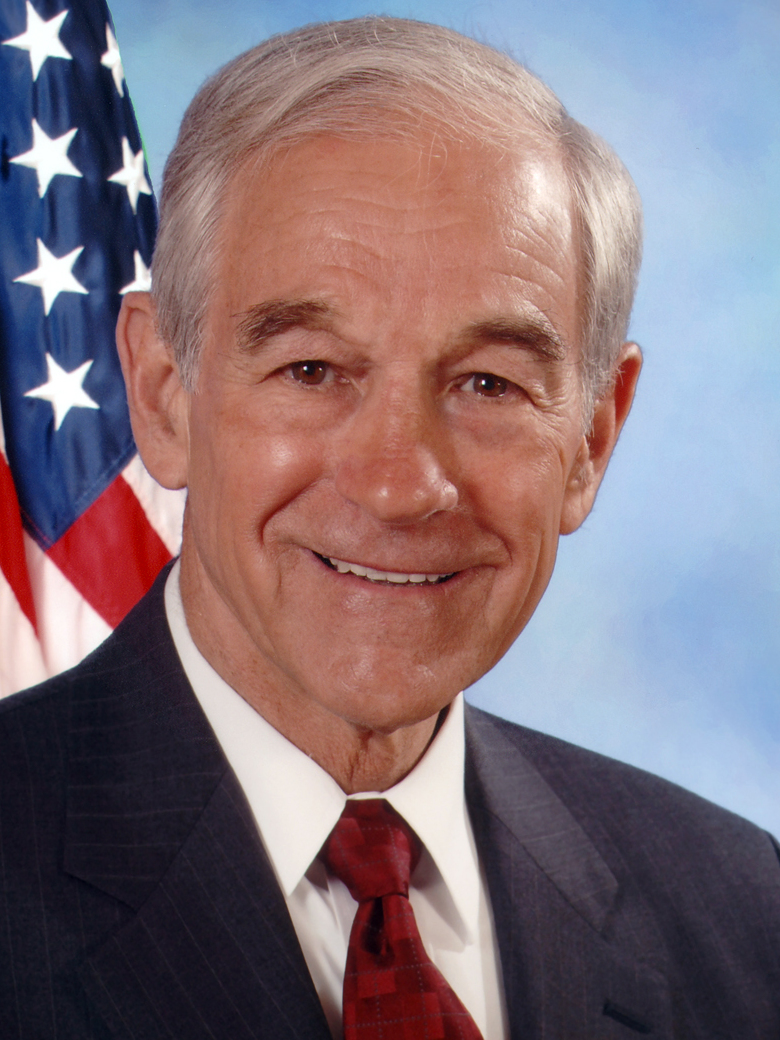

| Candidate | Mitt Romney | John McCain |
| Home state | Massachusetts | Arizona |
| Delegate count | 8 | 5 |
| Popular vote | 3,490 | 2,224 |
| Percentage | 35.82% | 22.83% |
| Candidate | Ron Paul | Mike Huckabee |
| Home state | Texas | Arkansas |
| Delegate count | 5 | 5 |
| Popular vote | 2,082 | 1,947 |
| Percentage | 21.37% | 19.98% |

The 2008 North Dakota Republican presidential caucuses took place on February 5, 2008. Romney won with 8 of the 23 national delegates.

== Results ==
100% of precincts reporting
| Candidate | Votes | Percentage | Delegates |
|---|---|---|---|
| Mitt Romney | 3,490 | 35.82% | 8 |
| John McCain | 2,224 | 22.83% | 5 |
| Ron Paul | 2,082 | 21.37% | 5 |
| Mike Huckabee | 1,947 | 19.98% | 5 |
| Total | 9,743 | 100% | 23 |

== See also ==
- 2008 North Dakota Democratic presidential caucuses
- 2008 Republican Party presidential primaries
