= Democrats Abroad presidential primary =

Democrats Abroad holds a primary awarding delegates to the Democratic National Convention to represent expatriate voters. This primary is conducted as part of the Democratic Party's presidential primaries. In some earlier elections, in place of a primary, a caucus system was used by Democrats Abroad to determine their convention delegations.

== Summary ==
Election	Winner	%	Runner-up	%	Turnout	Total delegates
1980	Ted Kennedy	–	–	–	–	–
1984	Walter Mondale	37.5	Gary Hart	30.9	–	–
1988	Michael Dukakis	41.5	Jesse Jackson	14.5	2,385	–
1992	Paul Tsongas	37.0	Bill Clinton	27.0	–	–
1996	Bill Clinton	–	–	–	–	–
2000	Al Gore	–	–	–	–	7
2004	John Kerry	56.01	Howard Dean	18.9	2,239	7
2008	Barack Obama	65.9	Hillary Clinton	32.5	23,105	7
2012	Barack Obama	99.1	Uncommitted	0.9	2,734	19
2016	Bernie Sanders	68.8	Hillary Clinton	30.9	34,570	13
2020	Bernie Sanders	57.9	Joe Biden	22.7	39,984	13
2024	Joe Biden	80.1	Uncommitted	13.2	8,618	13

== 2024 primary ==
The 2024 Democrats Abroad presidential primary ran from Tuesday, March 5 until Tuesday, March 12, 2024. On March 25, it was announced that Incumbent President Joe Biden had won all 13 delegates, receiving 80.1% of the vote, after having already secured enough delegates to win the 2024 Democratic primaries on March 12. After Biden's withdrawal from the election on July 21, the delegates voted unanimously for Vice President Kamala Harris at the 2024 Democratic National Convention.

== 2020 primary ==
The 2020 Democrats Abroad presidential primary ran from Tuesday, March 3 until Tuesday, March 10 and reported a win for Bernie Sanders. With 57.9% of the vote, Sanders won 9 delegates, while 4 went to Joe Biden, who would go on to win the Democratic primaries, as well as the general election.

== 2016 primary ==
In the presidential primary of 2016, Democrats Abroad reported a win for Bernie Sanders. Receiving 69% of the vote to Hillary Clinton's 31%, Sanders picked up 9 delegates to Clinton's 4. Sanders also received 4 pledged superdelegates. Voter turnout was up 50% from the 2008 election, with 34,570 voters from over 170 countries.

== 2012 primary ==
For the 2012 Democratic primaries, Democrats Abroad held its second-ever global primary to choose the Democratic nominee for President. The 2012 Democrats Abroad Global Primary, held from May 1–6, 2012, allowed for in-person voting at more than 90 Voting Centers open in 33 countries around the world, as well as absentee voting via email, fax, and post. Incumbent U.S. president Barack Obama was unopposed in the Global Primary, but the worldwide Global Primary results helped to choose 11 of Democrats Abroad's 25 delegates to the 2012 Democratic National Convention as well as established the weighting for subsequent votes at the Democrats Abroad Global Convention.

Additional votes were held to fill delegate, alternate, page, and standing-committee positions held during the Democrats Abroad Global Convention in Puerto Vallarta, Mexico, from May 18–20, 2012. The delegation to the Democratic National Convention included the 11 delegates selected in the Global Primary, 4 more delegates and 1 alternate selected at the Democrats Abroad Global Convention, Democrats Abroad's 8 DNC members, 3 Standing Committee members, and 1 page.

The Democratic National Convention took place in Charlotte, North Carolina, from Sept. 3-6, 2012.

=== Results ===
On May 28, 2012, Democrats Abroad released the full list of delegates elected in the organization's Global Primary. The results were certified by the international chair, Ken Sherman.

=== Democratic National Convention Delegates ===
25 delegates, including 8 superdelegates, represented Democrats Abroad at the Democratic National Convention in Charlotte, North Carolina, from Sept. 3-6, 2012. Democrats Abroad is the official arm of the Democratic Party for Americans living outside the United States.

== 2008 primary ==
For the 2008 Democratic primaries, Democrats Abroad enabled millions of U.S. citizens living overseas to have the chance to vote in the first-ever online global primary to choose the Democratic nominee for President.

The Democratic global primary allowed for voting by Internet, fax, and post. Traditional drop-in voting centers were also open in more than 30 countries worldwide.

The worldwide election results determined the 14 delegates who joined eight DNC members in Democrats Abroad's delegation of 22 to the Democratic National Convention. These delegates were elected at a combination of regional and global meetings held during early 2008. These meetings also provided an opportunity for Americans abroad to shape the party's election platform.

American citizens living overseas who wanted to vote in the Democratic global primary had to have joined Democrats Abroad by January 31 and then requested a ballot at VoteFromAbroad.org. They could also join in person at voting centers.

The Democrats Abroad Global Primary took place from February 5–12, 2008. Democrats Abroad Regional Caucuses for Europe-Middle East-Africa took place in Brussels on March 15, 2008, and for the Americas and Asia-Pacific in Vancouver, Canada, on April 11, 2008.

The Democrats Abroad Global Convention took place in Vancouver, April 12–13, 2008.

=== Results ===
On February 21, 2008, Democrats Abroad announced that Senator Barack Obama won the organization's Global Primary. The results were certified by the international chair Christine Marques in Geneva, Switzerland.

The results of the Global Primary were as follows:

Obama 65.6%
Clinton 32.7%
Edwards 0.7%
Kucinich 0.6%
Biden 0.1%
Richardson 0.1%
Uncommitted 0.2%

Under the Democrats Abroad Delegate Selection Plan, the results of the worldwide primary were applied to the regional caucuses once the allocation of delegates from each caucus was made. The results allocated 6 delegates to be elected from the Europe-Middle East-Africa Regional Caucus, 2 from the Americas Regional Caucus, and 1 from the Asia-Pacific Regional Caucus.

There were 4 delegates for Obama and 2 for Clinton from Europe-Middle East-Africa; 1 each for Obama and Clinton from the Americas; and 1 for Obama from Asia-Pacific.

These results determined the allocation of 4.5 delegate votes at the Democratic National Convention. Senator Obama won 3 delegate votes, and Senator Clinton 1.5 delegate votes. A further 2.5 votes were determined at the Democrats Abroad Global Convention in April. In addition, Democrats Abroad held 4 super-delegate votes. A total of 22 delegates, each with a half vote, attended the convention.

== 2004 caucus ==
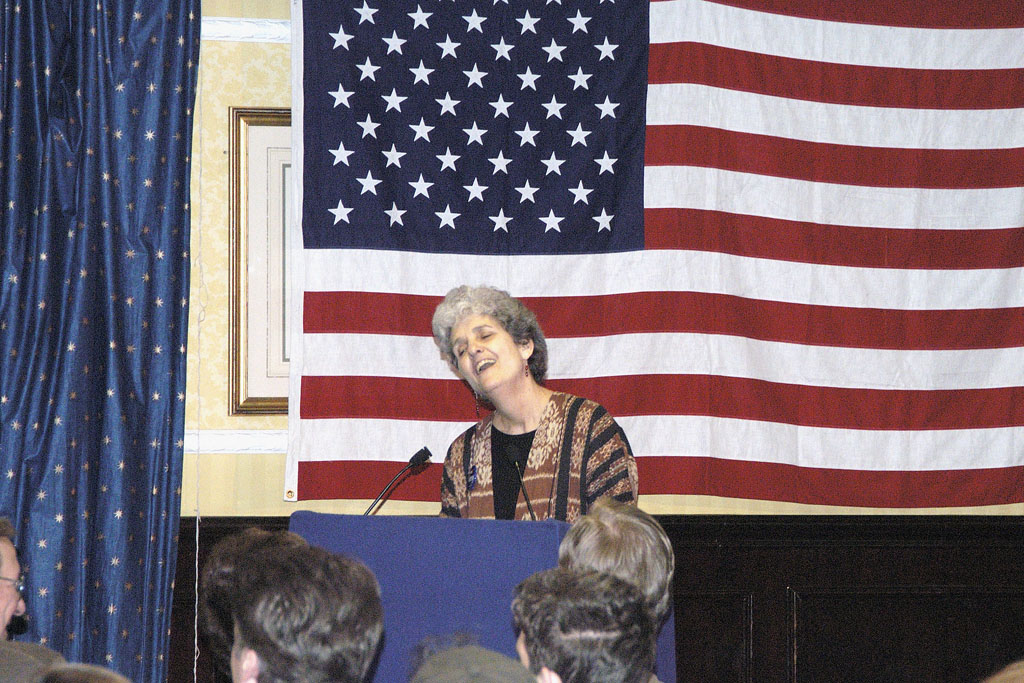
Diana Kerry addresses Democrats Abroad.

In 2004, Democrats Abroad chose its delegates to the Democratic National Convention via a caucus system, similar to the Iowa caucuses. Caucuses are different from primaries. In the latter, people show up, vote, and go home. In a caucus, different areas or rooms are available for each candidate so that his or her supporters can gather and discuss their candidate's strengths and weaknesses. Caucusgoers who are unsure of their choice can move from room to room to hear about multiple candidates. Straw polls may be taken during the process. Eventually, all the caucusgoers meet in a plenary session and representatives from each room give a short presentation on why his or her candidate should be the Democratic nominee. Then a vote is taken. If some candidates' support is below a certain threshold, that candidate is eliminated and everyone is given the opportunity to switch support. Then a final vote is taken and the number of delegates for each candidate is determined, proportional to his or her share of the vote. The final step consists of the actual election of the delegates pledged to each candidate.

Local caucuses were held February 6–9, 2004 and country caucuses February 20–23, 2004. At these caucuses delegates to the regional and world caucuses were elected according to the process discussed above. The regional and world Democrats Abroad caucuses were held back-to-back in Edinburgh, Scotland, March 26–28. The city of Edinburgh held a reception for the delegates at which the mayor spoke and praised the delegates for their active participation in the democratic process.

At the caucuses, politicians spoke, as well as Diana Kerry, the sister of the eventual nominee Sen. John Kerry.

22 delegates and two alternates went to the 2004 Democratic National Convention in Boston.

== 2000 caucus ==
Al Gore won the 2000 Democrats Abroad presidential caucus. The Democrats Abroad delegation consisted of seven Gore delegates and two unbound superdelegates.

== 1996 caucus ==
Bill Clinton won the 1996 Democrats Abroad presidential caucus.

== 1992 caucus ==
Paul Tsongas won the 1992 Democrats Abroad presidential caucus with 37% of the vote. Bill Clinton came in second-place with 27% of the vote.

== 1988 primary ==
The 1988 Democrats Abroad presidential primary consisted of mail-in voting from 30 countries and in-person voting at the Queen Elizabeth II Centre in London, England. Michael Dukakis won with 41.5% of the vote, and Jesse Jackson came in second-place with 14.5%. 2,385 ballots were cast.

== 1984 primary ==
Walter Mondale won the 1984 Democrats Abroad presidential primary with 37.54% of the vote. Gary Hart came in second with 30.89% and Jesse Jackson in third with 9.62%.

== 1980 caucus ==
Ted Kennedy won the 1980 Democrats Abroad presidential caucus.
