= 2008 Missouri Republican presidential primary =

- February 5, 2008

58 pledged delegates to the Republican National Convention All delegates are awarded to the candidate receiving the most votes

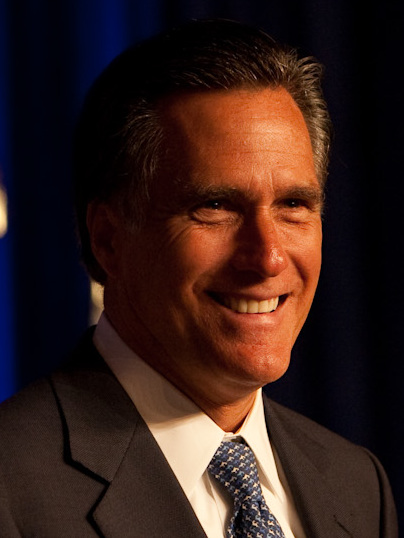
Candidate	John McCain	Mike Huckabee	Mitt Romney
Home state	Arizona	Arkansas	Massachusetts
Delegate count	58	0	0
Popular vote	194,053	185,642	172,329
Percentage	32.96%	31.53%	29.27%
- County results John McCain Mike Huckabee Mitt Romney

The 2008 Missouri Republican presidential primary on February 5, 2008, determined the recipient of 55 of the state's 58 delegates to the Republican National Convention in the process to elect the 44th President of the United States. It was an open primary. John McCain won a slight plurality of the vote, receiving all of Missouri's delegates.

== Results ==
100% of precincts reporting
Candidate	Votes	Percentage	Counties	Delegates
John McCain	194,053	32.96%	32	58
Mike Huckabee	185,642	31.53%	72	0
Mitt Romney	172,329	29.27%	12	0
Ron Paul	26,464	4.50%	0	0
Rudy Giuliani*	3,593	0.61%	0	0
Fred Thompson*	3,102	0.53%	0	0
Alan Keyes	892	0.15%	0	0
Duncan Hunter*	307	0.05%	0	0
Virgil Wiles	124	0.02%	0	0
Tom Tancredo*	107	0.02%	0	0
Daniel Ayers Gilbert	88	0.01%	0	0
Hugh Cort	46	0.01%	0	0
Uncommitted	2,097	0.35%	0	0
Total	588,720	100%	116	58

*Candidate dropped out prior to primary

== Opinion polling ==
Please see the following article for opinion polling: Statewide opinion polling for the 2008 Republican Party presidential primaries

== County by county results ==
County by County Results
County	John McCain	%	Mike Huckabee	%	Mitt Romney	%	Ron Paul	%
Adair	558	29.00%	735	38.20%	451	23.44%	158	8.21%
Andrew	501	27.96%	484	27.01%	641	35.77%	120	6.70%
Atchison	281	37.92%	189	25.51%	230	31.04%	25	3.37%
Audrain	744	33.2%						
Barry	1,365	28.3%						
Barton	525	24.6%						
Bates	594	37.7%						
Benton	803	34.7%						
Bollinger	518	31.3%						
Boone	4,948	31.3%						
Buchanan	2,194	31.6%						
Butler	1,117	24.6%						
Caldwell	363	36.0%						
Callaway	1,203	27.1%						
Camden	2,196	33.9%						
Cape Girardeau	3,528	31.8%						
Carroll	437	47.8%						
Carter	202	28.4%						
Cass	3,195	31.3%						
Cedar	709	31.04%	1,051	46.02%	403	17.64%	63	2.76%
Chariton	244	34.41%	260	36.67%	167	23.55%	28	3.95%
Christian	2,943	24.37%	5,852	48.46%	2,748	22.75%	416	3.44%
Clark	283	44.1%						
Clay	6,006	32.8%						
Clinton	603	31.6%						
Cole	2,982	28.74%	3,247	31.30%	3,729	35.95%	227	2.19%
Cooper	503	28.2%						
Crawford	713	32.7%						
Dade	418	27.52%	769	50.63%	275	18.10%	43	2.83%
Dallas	751	30.39%	1,153	46.66%	428	17.32%	105	4.25%
Daviess	236	30.0%						
DeKalb	310	30.2%						
Dent	959	48.8%						
Douglas	516	21.15%	1,343	55.04%	270	11.07%	290	12.09%
Dunklin	480	21.46%	1,309	58.52%	381	17.03%	36	1.61%
Franklin	4,032	35.7%						
Gasconade	793	40.25%	514	26.09%	536	27.21%	75	3.81%
Gentry	182	31.0%						
Greene	9,979	27.09%	15,645	42.48%	9,271	25.17%	1,552	4.21%
Grundy	377	34.5%						
Harrison	288	32.7%						
Henry	763	37.0%						
Hickory	453	33.19%	548	40.15%	238	20.73%	64	4.69%
Holt	190	29.83%	194	30.46%	201	31.55%	34	5.34%
Howard	283	28.44%	328	32.96%	319	32.06%	52	5.23%
Howell	1,347	24.76%	2,882	52.97%	793	14.57%	356	6.54%
Iron	269	32.80%	354	43.17%	138	16.83%	43	5.24%
Jackson	12,356	33.0%						
Jasper	3,220	25.8%						
Jefferson	6,358	33.5%						
Johnson	1,558	36.2%						
Knox	101	29.4%						
Laclede	1,656	30.21%	2,791	50.91%	807	14.72%	142	2.59%
Lafayette	1,148	35.3%						
Lawrence	1,412	26.19%	2,628	48.75%	1,022	18.96%	232	4.30%
Lewis	279	34.23%	286	35.09%	197	24.17%	32	3.93%
Lincoln	1,412	30.8%						
Linn	361	33.0%						
Livingston	488	38.9%	426	33.9%	248	19.8%	75	6.0%
McDonald	674	25.55%	1,285	48.71%	389	14.75%	233	8.83%
Macon	441	28.5%	646	41.7%	390	25.2%	43	2.8%
Madison	452	35.48%	560	43.96%	185	14.52%	51	4.00%
Maries	343	29.70%	415	35.93%	321	27.79%	59	5.11%
Marion	714	26.71%	904	33.82%	891	33.33%	114	4.26%
Mercer	114	27.7%	132	32.1%	62	15.1%	91	22.1%
Miller	1,094	31.50%	1,406	40.48%	790	22.75%	109	3.14%
Mississippi	373	33.73%	471	42.59%	226	20.43%	15	1.36%
Moniteau	510	28.5%	693	38.8%	466	26.1%	98	5.5%
Monroe	221	27.59%	300	37.45%	231	28.84%	32	4.00%
Montgomery	554	39.74%	439	31.49%	313	22.45%	65	4.66%
Morgan	857	34.3%	896	35.9%	615	24.6%	76	3.0%
New Madrid	386	28.68%	656	48.74%	250	18.57%	43	3.19%
Newton	1,983	26.0%	3,476	45.5%	1,744	22.8%	350	4.6%
Nodaway	586	35.7%	468	28.5%	469	28.6%	83	5.1%
Oregon	242	20.47%	696	58.88%	134	11.34%	101	8.54%
Osage	665	33.47%	628	31.61%	610	30.70%	42	2.11%
Ozark	428	26.87%	766	48.09%	235	14.75%	149	9.35%
Pemiscot	233	23.75%	565	57.59%	149	15.19%	20	2.04%
Perry	973	43.59%	575	25.76%	542	24.28%	96	4.30%
Pettis	1,372	36.4%	994	26.4%	1,226	32.5%	110	2.9%
Phelps	1,459	29.7%	1,728	35.2%	1,340	27.3%	321	6.5%
Pike	463	32.58%	461	32.44%	388	27.30%	84	5.91%
Platte	2,793	33.49%	1,825	21.88%	3,109	37.27%	472	5.66%
Polk	1,141	25.28%	2,317	51.33%	842	18.65%	154	3.41%
Pulaski	1,129	36.19%	1,216	38.97%	641	20.54%	66	2.12%
Putnam	164	28.1%	254	43.5%	128	21.9%	28	4.8%
Ralls	256	27.00%	376	39.66%	279	29.43%	24	2.53%
Randolph	623	28.2%	824	37.2%	632	28.6%	95	4.3%
Ray	554	28.9%	709	37.0%	495	25.8%	126	6.6%
Reynolds	202	32.90%	283	46.09%	93	15.15%	25	4.07%
Ripley	329	23.62%	750	53.84%	238	17.09%	52	3.73%
Saline	617	38.3%	518	32.2%	392	24.3%	51	3.2%
Schuyler	103	25.5%	179	44.3%	84	20.8%	29	7.2%
Scotland	129	29.8%	185	42.7%	94	21.7%	16	3.7%
Scott	1,389	33.0%	1,549	36.8%	1,076	25.6%	113	2.7%
Shannon	223	23.57%	515	54.44%	83	8.77%	109	11.52%
Shelby	206	29.43%	321	45.86%	140	20.00%	18	2.57%
St. Charles	14,705	34.95%	9,185	21.83%	15,869	37.72%	1,613	3.83%
St. Clair	437	33.1%	572	43.3%	246	18.6%	44	3.3%
St. Francois	1,727	38.0%	1,631	35.9%	949	20.9%	134	2.9%
St. Louis County	39,011	41.1%	16,131	17.0%	34,668	36.5%	3,339	3.5%
St. Louis City	4,371	44.5%	1,613	16.4%	2,858	29.1%	684	7.0%
Ste. Genevieve	518	40.76%	419	32.97%	270	21.24%	47	3.70%
Stoddard	772	24.85%	1,571	50.56%	643	20.70%	91	2.93%
Stone	1,787	31.8%	2,528	45.0%	1,056	18.8%	154	2.7%
Sullivan	197	32.45%	209	34.43%	130	21.42%	60	9.88%
Taney	1,784	25.90%	3,850	55.89%	976	14.17%	195	2.83%
Texas	954	27.69%	1,727	50.13%	480	13.93%	234	6.79%
Vernon	705	32.64%	920	42.59%	408	18.89%	74	3.43%
Warren	1,192	33.87%	988	28.08%	1,139	32.37%	130	3.69%
Washington	616	38.36%	622	38.73%	297	18.49%	50	3.11%
Wayne	499	30.48%	740	45.20%	323	19.73%	46	2.81%
Webster	1,343	26.59%	2,576	51.00%	897	17.76%	168	3.33%
Worth	73	28.63%	84	32.94%	77	30.20%	10	3.92%
Wright	746	23.69%	1,878	59.64%	298	9.46%	178	5.65%
TOTALS								

== See also ==
- 2008 Missouri Democratic presidential primary
- 2008 Republican Party presidential primaries
