= 2008 Democrats Abroad presidential primary =

- February 5–12, 2008

Nominee	Barack Obama	Hillary Clinton
Party	Democratic	Democratic
Home state	Illinois	New York
Delegate count	4½	2½
Popular vote	15,214	7,501
Percentage	65.85%	32.46%
- Election results by country. Barack Obama Hillary Clinton John Edwards (Note: won Aruba) Tie Obama prevailed in all areas (Americas, Asia-Pacific and EMEA) and in Overseas Military Mail (APO-AA, (Note: Armed forces in Europe, the Middle East, Africa, and Canada) APO-AP, (Note: Armed forces in the Pacific) APO-AE (Note: Armed forces in the Americas excluding Canada))

The 2008 Democrats Abroad presidential primary took place from February 5, 2008 (Super Tuesday) until February 12.

The first voting began at midnight in Indonesia, with one of the first unofficial results coming from a polling station at the JW Marriott Hotel in Jakarta. Of roughly 100 votes, 75% were for Senator Barack Obama and 25% for Senator Hillary Clinton. The midnight vote was an attempt to replicate the voting at Dixville Notch, New Hampshire during the New Hampshire primary.

This was the first Democrats Abroad primary in which voters could vote online, and by the end of the primary, online votes had been cast from 164 countries and territories. Democrats Abroad announced the worldwide results on February 21, 2008, declaring Barack Obama the winner. Democrats Abroad held a global convention on April 12, 2008.

== Results ==
Key:	Withdrew prior to contest

=== Primary ===
Primary dates: February 5–12, 2008

National pledged delegate votes determined: 7 (of 7)

Democrats Abroad presidential primary, 2008
Candidate	Votes	Percentage	National delegate votes
Barack Obama	15,214	65.85%	4½
Hillary Clinton	7,501	32.46%	2½
John Edwards	159	0.69%	0
Dennis Kucinich	143	0.62%	0
Bill Richardson	19	0.08%	0
Joe Biden	15	0.06%	0
Uncommitted	54	0.23%	0
Totals	23,105	100.00%	7

A breakdown of results by country and voting method is also available.

=== Regional caucus ===
While the nine pledged regional delegates (each with a half vote, for a total of 4½ votes) were selected at the regional caucuses, the number allocated to each candidate was pre-determined by the results of the primary. According to the Democrats Abroad Delegate Selection Plan: "The binding presidential preference primary will determine the allocation of these nine (9) At-Large Delegates among the presidential candidates; the Regional Caucus will elect such Delegates based on such allocation."

Caucus dates: March 15–April 11, 2008

National pledged delegate votes determined: 0 (of 7)

Democrats Abroad Democratic regional caucuses, 2008
Candidate	Regional delegate votes	Percentage	National delegate votes
Barack Obama	3	66.67%	4½
Hillary Clinton	1½	33.33%	2½
Totals	4½	100.00%	7

=== Global convention ===
While the five pledged At-Large and pledged PLEO delegates (each with a half vote, for a total of 2½ votes) were selected at the global convention, the number allocated to each candidate was pre-determined by the results of the primary. According to the Democrats Abroad Delegate Selection Plan: "The binding presidential preference primary will determine the allocation of these three (3) At-Large Delegates and the two (2) Pledged PLEO Delegates among the presidential candidates; the Global Convention will elect such Delegates based on such allocation."

Convention date: April 12, 2008

National pledged delegate votes determined: 0 (of 7)

Democrats Abroad Democratic presidential global convention, 2008
Candidate	At-Large and PLEO delegate votes	Percentage	National delegate votes
Barack Obama	1½	60.00%	4½
Hillary Clinton	1	40.00%	2½
Totals	2½	100.00%	7

=== 2008 Democratic National Committee Convention delegates ===
Twenty-two delegates, including 8 superdelegates, traveled 125,000 miles from around the world to Denver, CO to represent Democrats Abroad at the Democratic National Convention August 25–28, 2008. Democrats Abroad is the official arm of the Democratic Party for Americans living outside of the United States. The 22 delegates each have a half vote, bringing the organization's total votes to 11.

Every member of the Democrats Abroad delegation had taken part in the "Green Delegate Challenge" sponsored by House Speaker and Permanent Convention Chair Nancy Pelosi (D-CA) and Convention organizers, by obtaining carbon offsets for their travel.

=== Criticism ===
Criticism focused on the internet voting, suggesting the possibility of hacking and other subterfuge, though there was no evidence that such hacking occurred.

==== Alleged corporate and partisan influence ====
Professor David Dill of Stanford University questioned whether having a private company run a public election, with little oversight, was appropriate. The software used for Internet voting was provided by the private company Everyone Counts. The provider of internet voting was spun off from an Australian company in 2003. In 2006 the company received an "injection of U.S. private equity" from an undisclosed source.

The corporation running the election, Everyone Counts, named Paul DeGregorio, former Republican chair of the Election Assistance Commission as Chief Operating Officer in 2007.

==== Partial results reporting ====
The final results for the February 5–12 Democrats Abroad Global Primary were not released until February 21, nine days after the voting had concluded. The initial reporting of results incorrectly reported the results of the election. The error was reported as a result of "a programming error in a spreadsheet column."

Rule 13 allowed reporting of "provisional" results on the first day of voting. Based on partial results, the international news media reported large Obama victories as soon as these manual polling stations closed. These totals did not include any of the postal or Internet votes:

At 3 a.m., there are still around 30 Democrats watching CNN as results are projected on a giant screen. When the news channel reports that Obama has apparently won the international Democratic primary in Jakarta, Indonesia, they begin cheering -- more because the station has just flashed the Democrats Abroad logo on the screen than because the Illinois senator has won.

Tokyo Voting Center Results

These are the results for the Voting Center in Tokyo, this tally is provisional, does not include internet, fax or mailed ballots, and is subject to ratification from the chair of Democrats Abroad. But here goes.... (drum roll please) 2/5/2008 Tokyo Voting Center % report = 83% Obama 13% Clinton 2% Edwards 1.% Kucinich 1.% Richardson

In the end the ballot boxes produced a 971 to 422 victory for Obama.

Voting was scheduled to occur from February 5–12, not just on February 5.

== See also ==
- Democratic Party (United States) presidential primaries, 2008
- Results of the 2008 Democratic Party presidential primaries
