= 2008 Louisiana Democratic presidential primary =

- February 9, 2008

Candidate	Barack Obama	Hillary Clinton
Home state	Illinois	New York
Delegate count	33	23
Popular vote	220,632	136,925
Percentage	57.40%	35.63%
- Parish results Obama: 40–50% 50–60% 60–70% 70–80% Clinton: 40–50% 50–60% 60–70%

The 2008 Louisiana Democratic presidential primary took place on February 9, 2008, and had 56 delegates at stake. The winner in each of Louisiana's seven congressional districts was awarded all of that district's delegates, totaling 37. Another 29 delegates were awarded to the statewide winner, Barack Obama. The 56 delegates represented Louisiana at the Democratic National Convention in Denver, Colorado. Ten other unpledged delegates, known as superdelegates, also attended the convention and cast their votes as well.

== Results ==
2008 Louisiana Democratic Presidential Primary Results
Party	Candidate	Votes	Percentage	Delegates
Democratic	Barack Obama	220,632	57.40%	33
Democratic	Hillary Clinton	136,925	35.63%	23
Democratic	John Edwards	13,026	3.39%	0
Democratic	Joe Biden	6,178	1.61%	0
Democratic	Bill Richardson	4,257	1.11%	0
Democratic	Christopher Dodd	1,924	0.50%	0
Democratic	Dennis Kucinich	1,404	0.37%	0
Totals		384,346	100.00%	56
Voter turnout		%		—

== See also ==
- 2008 Democratic Party presidential primaries
- 2008 Louisiana Republican presidential caucuses and primary
