= 2008 Vermont Democratic presidential primary =

- March 4, 2008

23 Democratic National Convention delegates (15 pledged, 8 unpledged)

Candidate	Barack Obama	Hillary Clinton
Home state	Illinois	New York
Delegate count	9	6
Popular vote	91,901	59,806
Percentage	59.31%	38.59%
- County results Obama: 40–50% 50–60% 60–70%

The 2008 Vermont Democratic presidential primary was an open primary that took place on March 4, 2008. Barack Obama won the primary, his only decisive win among the four March 4 contests. The primary determined the 15 pledged delegates that represented Vermont at the 2008 Democratic National Convention. The delegates were awarded to the candidates, Obama and Hillary Clinton, on a proportional basis. Vermont also sent 8 unpledged "superdelegates", to the convention not bound by the results of the primary.

== Delegate breakdown ==
The Vermont Democratic Party sent 23 total delegates to the 2008 Democratic National Convention. Of those delegates, 15 were pledged and 8 were unpledged. The 15 pledged delegates were allocated (pledged) to vote for a particular candidate at the National Convention according to the results of Vermont's Democratic primary on March 4. The 8 unpledged delegates (popularly called "superdelegates" because their votes represented their personal decisions rather than the collective decision of many voters) were free to vote for any candidate at the National Convention and were selected by the Vermont Democratic Party's officials.

The 15 pledged delegates were further divided into 10 district delegates and 5 statewide delegates. The 10 district delegates represented Vermont's single Congressional District. The 5 statewide delegates were divided into 3 at-large delegates and 2 Party Leaders and Elected Officials (abbreviated PLEOs).

Of the 8 unpledged delegates, 7 were selected in advance and 1 was selected at the Vermont Democratic Party's National Convention Delegate Meeting on June 7. The delegates selected in advance were 5 Democratic National Committee members, U.S. Representative from Vermont Peter Welch, and U.S. Senator from Vermont Patrick Leahy.

== Delegate selection process ==
The Vermont Democratic Party used the results of the state's presidential preference primary on March 4 to determine the allocation of delegates to each presidential candidate. Though the primary was used for allocating delegates, the delegates themselves were selected in a caucus process. On March 22, the Party held a series of town-level caucuses to select its first tier of delegates. On May 24, the Party held its state convention in which the town-level delegates selected the 10 district-level delegates to attend the 2008 Democratic National Convention. The remaining 5 pledged delegates, plus the remaining unpledged delegate, were selected at the Vermont Democratic Party's National Convention Delegate Meeting on June 7.

== Polls ==
On February 24, 2008, polls showed Sen. Barack Obama leading Sen. Hillary Clinton by an average margin of 24% (57% to 33%), with 10% Not Sure.

== Results ==
Key:	Withdrew prior to contest

2008 Vermont Democratic presidential primary
Candidate	Votes	Percentage	Delegates
Barack Obama	91,901	59.31%	9
Hillary Clinton	59,806	38.59%	6
John Edwards	1,936	1.25%	0
Dennis Kucinich	1,010	0.65%	0
Write-in candidates	307	0.20%	0
Totals	154,960	100.00%	15

== See also ==
- 2008 Democratic Party presidential primaries
- 2008 Vermont Republican presidential primary
