= 2008 North Dakota Democratic presidential caucuses =

- February 5, 2008

Candidate	Barack Obama	Hillary Clinton
Home state	Illinois	New York
Delegate count	8	5
Popular vote	11,625	6,948
Percentage	61.15%	36.55%
- Election results by state legislative district. Barack Obama Hillary Clinton

The 2008 North Dakota Democratic presidential caucuses took place on February 5, 2008, one of the many Super Tuesday nominating contests held that day. Barack Obama won the caucuses, securing 8 out of 13 national delegates.

== Process ==
The caucus was a party-run primary, with over 100 locations throughout the state, held between 2:00 pm and 8:00 pm Central Standard Time. Eligible voters included all eligible voters who cast a ballot for a Democrat in the last general election or planned to in the next election, and would not cast a ballot in the Republican caucus. All voters were required to sign a statement of eligibility, but their status was not otherwise checked. All ballots were secret, and unlike most caucuses, North Dakota's featured no physical division into preference groups.

Actual delegates were apportioned at Legislative District conventions held in February and March based on the results of the caucuses in each legislative district. At the state convention in April, delegates from the Legislative District conventions selected pledged delegates to the national convention. A minimum 15% threshold was required at the local caucus, legislative district, and state convention levels. A unique feature of the North Dakota Dem-NPL process was that delegates were elected from Preference Caucuses which may or may not relate to candidates. National convention delegates were elected by an Education Caucus; a Labor Caucus; the Prairie Campaign for Economic Democracy; and Uncommitted, among others. Any group wishing to affiliate and could secure 15% of the state convention votes was allowed to elect two national convention delegates. The delegation was supposed to give collective good-faith consideration to the Feb. 5 presidential preference caucus, which elected no delegates to the district or state conventions.

== Results ==
=== Precinct caucus results ===
Caucus date: February 5, 2008

National pledged delegates determined: 0 (of 13)

Key:	Withdrew prior to contest

North Dakota Democratic presidential precinct caucuses, 2008
Candidate	Precinct delegates	Percentage	Estimated national delegates
Barack Obama	11,625	61.15%	8
Hillary Clinton	6,948	36.55%	5
John Edwards	283	1.49%	0
Dennis Kucinich	72	0.38%	0
Mike Gravel	31	0.16%	0
Others	53	0.28%	0
Totals	19,012	100.00%	13

== See also ==
- 2008 Democratic Party presidential primaries
- 2008 North Dakota Republican presidential caucuses
