= 2008 Tennessee Democratic presidential primary =

- February 5, 2008

58 Democratic National Convention delegates

Candidate	Hillary Clinton	Barack Obama
Home state	New York	Illinois
Delegate count	40	28
Popular vote	336,245	254,874
Percentage	53.82%	40.48%
- County results Clinton: 40–50% 50–60% 60–70% 70–80% 80–90% Obama: 40–50% 50–60% 60–70%

The 2008 Tennessee Democratic presidential primary took place on February 5, 2008, also known as Super Tuesday. The primary determined 58 delegates to the 2008 Democratic National Convention, who were awarded on a proportional basis. Hillary Clinton won with 53.82% of the vote and was awarded 40 delegates.

Barack Obama placed second, getting 40.48% of the vote and was awarded 28 delegates.

== Results ==
Key:	Withdrew prior to contest

Democratic Primary Presidential Preference
Candidate	Votes	Percentage	National delegates
Hillary Clinton	336,245	53.82%	40
Barack Obama	254,874	40.48%	28
John Edwards	27,820	4.45%	0
Joe Biden	1,531	0.25%	0
Bill Richardson	1,178	0.19%	0
Dennis Kucinich	971	0.16%	0
Christopher Dodd	526	0.08%	0
Mike Gravel	461	0.07%	0
Uncommitted	3,158	0.51%	0
Totals	624,764	100.00%	68

== See also ==
- 2008 Democratic Party presidential primaries
- 2008 Tennessee Republican presidential primary
- 2008 United States presidential election in Tennessee
- 2008 Tennessee elections
