= 2008 Colorado Democratic presidential caucuses =

- February 5, 2008

70 Democratic National Convention delegates

Candidate	Barack Obama	Hillary Clinton
Home state	Illinois	New York
Delegate count	35	20
Popular vote	80,113	38,839
Percentage	66.53%	32.26%
- Caucus results by county Clinton: 40–50% 50–60% 60–70% Obama: 40–50% 50–60% 60–70% 70–80% 80–90% Tie

The 2008 Colorado Democratic presidential caucuses took place on Super Tuesday, February 5, 2008. As he did in every other state that held a caucus rather than a primary, Barack Obama won the caucus by a wide, two-to-one margin over Hillary Clinton.

== Process ==
As a cost-saving measure, Colorado stopped holding primary elections in 2000 in favor of a caucus system. Caucuses are run and paid for by the political parties. Both Republican and Democratic Caucus started at 7 p.m.

The Colorado Democratic Caucus was a closed caucus, open only to registered voters who registered as Democrats no later than December 5, 2007, with the exception of 18-year-olds or new citizens, who could register at the caucus site. The precinct chairs took presidential preference polls of all caucus attendees; these preference polls were reported to the media. After the preference poll, delegates were then selected among the attendees for each viable candidate, and supporters of nonviable groups could re-caucus into viable groups. Candidates were required to reach a 15-percent threshold for viability within each level of the selection process.

Following the local caucuses, county conventions, congressional district conventions, and the state convention, on May 17, 2008, were held to finally apportion delegates to the Democratic National Convention.

== Polls ==
A Denver Post poll from late January indicated that Barack Obama was leading Hillary Clinton, though polls from earlier in the year had shown Clinton with a double-digit lead.

== Results ==
=== Precinct Caucus Results ===
Total Precincts: 3,205

Caucus date: February 5, 2008

2008 Colorado Democratic Presidential Caucus Results
Party	Candidate	Votes	Percentage	Delegates
Democratic	Barack Obama	80,113	66.53%	35
Democratic	Hillary Clinton	38,839	32.26%	20
Democratic	Uncommitted	1,260	1.05%	0
Democratic	John Edwards	102	0.08%	0
Democratic	Dennis Kucinich	58	0.05%	0
Democratic	Mike Gravel	18	0.01%	0
Democratic	Bill Richardson	17	0.01%	0
Democratic	Joe Biden	4	0.00%	0
Democratic	Christopher Dodd	0	0.00%	0
Totals		120,971	100.00%	55
Voter turnout		%		—

=== County Assembly and Convention Results ===
Assembly/Convention Dates: February 20–March 17, 2008

National pledged delegates determined: 0 (of 55)

Key:	Withdrew prior to contest

Colorado Democratic presidential county assemblies/conventions, 2008 99% of counties reporting
Candidate	County delegates	Percentage	Estimated national delegates
Barack Obama	6,199	62.65%	36
Hillary Clinton	3,270	32.05%	19
Uncommitted	426	4.31%	0
Totals	9,895	100.00%	55

=== Congressional District Convention Results ===
Convention Dates: May 3–16, 2008

National pledged delegates determined: 36 (of 55)

Key:	Withdrew prior to contest

Colorado Democratic presidential congressional district conventions, 2008 100% of districts reporting
Candidate	District delegates	Percentage	Estimated national delegates
Barack Obama	23	63.9%	36
Hillary Clinton	13	36.1%	19
Totals	36	100%	55

=== State Convention Results ===
Convention Date: May 17, 2008

National pledged delegates determined: 19 (of 55)

Key:	Withdrew prior to contest

Colorado Democratic presidential state convention, 2008
Candidate	At-Large and PLEO delegates	Percentage	National delegates
Barack Obama	13	68.4%	36
Hillary Clinton	6	31.6%	19
Totals	19	100%	55

== Analysis ==
Barack Obama's large margin of victory in the Colorado Democratic Caucus can be traced to a number of factors. The Clinton campaign largely ignored organizing for caucuses and rather spent their time getting the vote out in bigger, more crucial states that had more delegates up for grabs. The Obama campaign took advantage of this and it ultimately paid off as caucusgoers in Colorado awarded Obama a more than two-to-one margin of victory. Obama performed extremely well statewide and won nearly every county. Clinton performed the best in Eastern Colorado where she won the more rural and conservative counties in the Eastern Slope.

== See also ==
- 2008 Colorado Republican Caucus
- 2008 Democratic Party presidential primaries
