= 2008 Nebraska Democratic presidential caucuses =

- February 9, 2008

Candidate	Barack Obama	Hillary Clinton
Home state	Illinois	New York
Delegate count	16	8
Popular vote	26,126	12,445
Percentage	67.56%	32.18%
- County results Obama: 50–60% 60–70% 70–80% 80–90% 100% Clinton: 50–60% 60–70% 70–80% 80–90% 100%

The 2008 Nebraska Democratic presidential caucuses took place on February 9, 2008, where 24 of the state's 31 convention delegates were chosen. Like he did throughout many other states that held caucuses instead of primaries, Barack Obama won the Nebraska Democratic Caucus by more than a two-to-one margin of victory over Hillary Clinton. On May 13, 2008, the state also held a non-binding primary election which Obama also won but the margin of victory was considerably smaller.

== Process ==
The Nebraska Democratic Caucus was open to all registered Democratic voters. Voters who were eligible to vote in the general election but were unregistered or registered with another party could register as Democrats at the caucus. Absentee votes for the disabled, those on active military duty, and full-time students were permitted.

After signing in, participants gathered into preference groups for each candidate. A minimum 15 percent of participants was required for viability. Only members of non-viable groups were permitted to realign to other viable groups. Afterwards, delegates were divided and elected to the county conventions in June.

The primary election held on May 13 was not binding on any county delegates, all of whom had been selected at the caucuses. However, it may have played a role in showing superdelegates to the Democratic National Convention the preference of Nebraska Democrats.

County delegates were committed to vote in the county conventions for the candidate they had supported during the caucuses. However, the same viability rules applied as at the precinct caucuses. The county conventions elected delegates to the Nebraska Democratic Party State Convention which took place June 20–22, who then elected delegates to the Democratic National Convention. The State Convention chose eight delegates pledged to Clinton and 16 pledged to Obama, the same number as the estimates following the main caucuses.

== Results ==
=== Precinct Caucus Results ===
Caucus Date: February 9, 2008 National Pledged Delegates Determined: 16 (of 24)

2008 Nebraska Democratic Presidential Caucus Results
Party	Candidate	Votes	Percentage	Delegates
Democratic	Barack Obama	26,126	67.56%	16
Democratic	Hillary Clinton	12,445	32.18%	8
Democratic	Uncommitted	99	0.26%	0
Totals		38,670	100.00%	24
Voter turnout		%		—

=== Primary ===
The Nebraska Democratic Party does not use the results of the primary to determine its delegates.

Primary Date: May 13, 2008 National Pledged Delegates Determined: 0 (of 24)

2008 Nebraska Democratic Presidential Primary Results
Party	Candidate	Votes	Percentage	Delegates
Democratic	Barack Obama	46,670	49.06%	0
Democratic	Hillary Clinton	43,979	46.24%	0
Democratic	Mike Gravel	3,886	4.09%	0
Democratic	Write-ins	584	0.61%	0
Totals		95,119	100.00%	0
Voter turnout		%		—

== Analysis ==
Barack Obama performed extremely well throughout the state of Nebraska in the caucus, winning a majority of counties. His large margin of victory can be attributed to his overwhelming wins in Douglas County, which contains Omaha, where he won with 77.12 percent of the vote, as well as in Lancaster County, which contains the state capital of Lincoln and is home to the University of Nebraska. Most of Clinton's wins in the state came in the far more rural counties in Western Nebraska. However, during the non-binding primary, Clinton carried almost every county in Nebraska except for Douglas and Lancaster counties which gave Obama the edge and narrow victory.

== See also ==
- 2008 Democratic Party presidential primaries
- 2008 Nebraska Republican presidential primary
