= 2008 Washington Democratic presidential caucuses =

- February 9, 2008

Candidate	Barack Obama	Hillary Clinton
Home state	Illinois	New York
Delegate count	52	26
Popular vote	21,768	10,038
Percentage	67.56%	31.15%
- County results Obama: 50–60% 60–70% 70–80% 80–90% 90–100% 100%

The 2008 Washington Democratic presidential caucuses were a series of events held by the Washington State Democratic Party to determine the delegates that the party sent to the 2008 Democratic National Convention. Delegates were selected in a four-tier process that began with precinct caucuses, was further refined in legislative district caucuses and/or county conventions, concluded for some delegates in the congressional district caucuses, and finally concluded for the remaining delegates at the state convention.

Washington also held a Democratic primary on February 19, 2008, but the Washington State Democratic Party did not use the results of the primary to determine its delegates.

== Delegate breakdown ==
The Washington State Democratic Party sent a total of 97 delegates to the 2008 Democratic National Convention. Of those delegates, 78 were pledged and 19 were unpledged. The 78 pledged delegates were allocated (pledged) to vote for a particular candidate at the National Convention according to the results of Washington's four-step caucus process. The 19 unpledged delegates were popularly called "superdelegates" because their vote represented their personal decisions, whereas the regular delegates' votes represented the collective decision of many voters. The superdelegates were free to vote for any candidate at the National Convention and were selected by the Washington State Democratic Party's officials and the pledged delegates.

The 78 pledged delegates were further divided into 51 district delegates and 27 statewide delegates. The 51 district delegates were divided among Washington's 9 Congressional Districts and were allocated to the presidential candidates based on the caucus results in each District. The 27 statewide delegates were divided into 17 at-large delegates and 10 Party Leaders and Elected Officials (abbreviated PLEOs). They were allocated to the presidential candidates at the State Convention based on the preference of the 51 district delegates on June 13–15.

Of the 19 unpledged delegates, 17 were selected in advance and 2 were selected at the State Convention. The delegates selected in advance were 7 Democratic National Committee members, the 2 Democratic U.S. Senators from Washington, Maria Cantwell and Patty Murray, the 6 Democratic U.S. Representatives from Washington, and the Democratic Governor of Washington, Christine Gregoire.

== Delegate selection process ==
=== Precinct caucuses ===
The precinct caucuses took place on February 9, 2008. Washington's two U.S. Senators, Patty Murray and Maria Cantwell, endorsed Senator Hillary Clinton earlier in the nomination season. The week before the caucuses, Senator Barack Obama was endorsed by Washington Governor Christine Gregoire.

The caucuses were open to all voters who would be 18 years old by November 4, 2008. To vote, participants completed a form with their contact information and candidate preference. The form also asked voters to sign an oath stating: "I declare that I consider myself to be a DEMOCRAT and I will not participate in the nomination process of any other political party for the 2008 Presidential election." In some caucus groups, members split into smaller groups according to the candidate they supported. Voters supporting non-viable candidates had the option of moving into viable groups, and voters in viable groups could change their preference. Unlike other state Democratic Party caucuses, Washington does not require a 15% threshold for allocation of delegates at the precinct level. Rules state that any fractional delegates remaining are awarded to the candidate with the most votes that do not have delegates.

=== Legislative District caucuses and County conventions ===
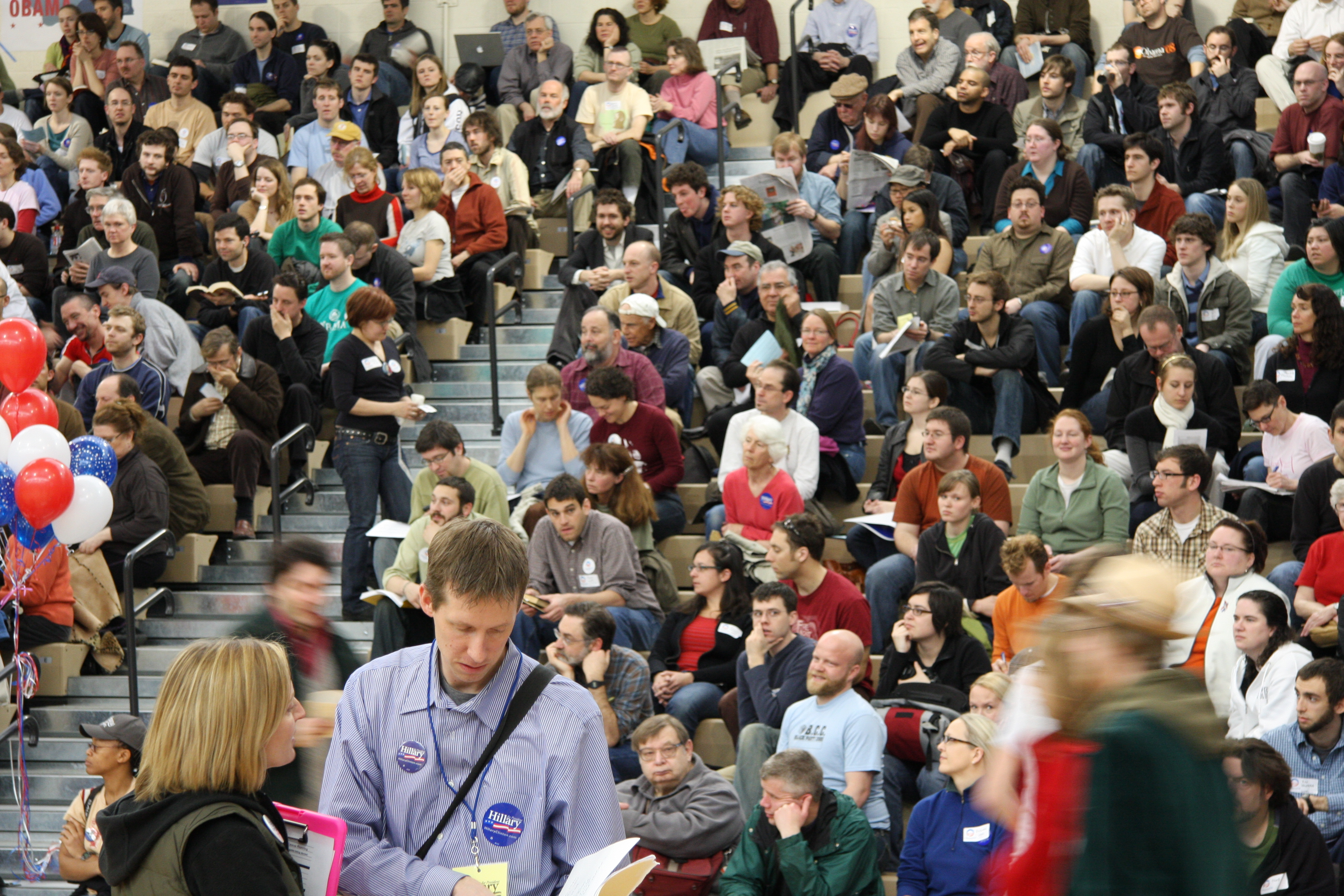
Democrats vote in the 43rd Legislative District Caucus, April 5, 2008

The second tier of the delegate selection process involved choosing 2,000 Legislative District delegates (and 1,000 alternates) to send to the Congressional District conventions on May 17 and the State Convention on June 13–15. There are 49 Legislative Districts in Washington State. Each district was allocated a certain number of delegates. Delegates were elected at either Legislative District caucuses or County conventions. Each of Washington's 39 counties has a local Democratic Party organization that determined the event at which delegate selection would take place. Most counties chose to select delegates at Legislative District caucuses on April 5. The remaining counties selected delegates at sub-caucuses during their County Conventions, most of which were held on either April 12 or April 19. The breakdown of events by date is listed below.

==== April 5 ====
Legislative District caucuses:

- 1st through 6th
- 8th
- 11th
- 12th
- 16th (Benton County portion only, held at the 8th LD caucus)
- 21st
- 25th through 34th
- 36th through 39th
- 40th (San Juan County portion only)
- 41st through 48th

County Convention:

- Whatcom (40th LD)

==== April 12 ====
County Conventions:

- Clallam (24th LD)
- Franklin (9th & 16th LDs)
- Grays Harbor (19th, 24th & 35th LDs)
- Kitsap (23rd & 35th LDs)
- Kittitas (13th LD)
- Pend Oreille (7th LD)
- Skagit (10th & 40th LDs)

==== April 13 ====
County Convention:

- Snohomish (10th LD)

==== April 19 ====
County Conventions:

- Asotin (9th LD)
- Chelan (13th LD)
- Clark (15th, 17th, 18th & 49th LDs)
- Cowlitz (18th & 19th LDs)
- Ferry (7th LD)
- Grant (13th LD)
- Island (10th LD)
- Klickitat (15th LD)
- Lewis (20th LD)
- Lincoln (7th LD)
- Mason (35th LD)
- Okanogan (7th LD)
- Pacific (19th LD)
- Skamania (15th LD)
- Spokane (7th & 9th LDs)
- Stevens (7th LD)
- Thurston (20th, 22nd & 35th LDs)
- Wahkiakum (19th LD)
- Whitman (9th LD)
- Yakima (13th, 14th & 15th LDs)

==== April 20 ====
County Convention:

- Walla Walla (16th LD)

==== April 26 ====
County Convention:

- Jefferson (24th LD)

==== Unknown date ====
County Conventions:

- Adams (9th LD)
- Garfield (9th LD)
- Columbia (16th LD)

=== Congressional district caucuses ===
Fifty-one delegates were chosen at the nine congressional district caucuses. Each district was allotted a different number of delegates:

- CD 1: 6
- CD 2: 6
- CD 3: 5
- CD 4: 3
- CD 5: 5
- CD 6: 6
- CD 7: 9
- CD 8: 6
- CD 9: 5

=== State convention ===
Twenty-nine delegates were chosen at the state convention, twenty-seven of which were pledged to vote for a particular candidate. Seventeen of these pledged delegates were "at-large" delegates that did not represent a specific Washington congressional district, and ten were party leaders and elected officials (PLEOs).

== Results ==
=== Precinct caucuses ===
Caucus date: February 9, 2008

National pledged delegates determined: 0 (of 78)

2008 Washington Democratic presidential precinct caucuses 96.4% of precincts reporting
Candidate	Precinct delegates	Percentage	Estimated national delegates
Barack Obama	21,768	67.56%	52
Hillary Clinton	10,038	31.15%	26
Other	50	0.16%	0
Uncommitted	364	1.13%	0
Totals	32,220	100.00%	78

=== Primary ===
The Washington State Democratic Party did not use the results of the primary to determine its delegates.

Primary date: February 19, 2008

National pledged delegates determined: 0 (of 78)

Key:	Withdrew prior to contest

2008 Washington Democratic presidential primary
Candidate	Votes	Percentage
Barack Obama	354,112	51.22%
Hillary Clinton	315,744	45.67%
John Edwards	11,892	1.72%
Dennis Kucinich	4,021	0.58%
Bill Richardson	2,040	0.30%
Joe Biden	1,883	0.27%
Mike Gravel	1,071	0.15%
Christopher Dodd	618	0.09%
Totals	691,381	100.00%

=== Legislative district caucuses and county conventions ===
Dashes indicate districts for which results are unavailable.

Caucus/Convention dates: April 5–26, 2008

National pledged delegates determined: 0 (of 78)

Washington Democratic Legislative District Caucuses and County Conventions, 2008 61% of districts reporting
Legislative District	Barack Obama	Hillary Clinton	Total State Delegates from this LD
LD1	32	12	44
LD2	26	14	40
LD3	–	–	33
LD4	–	–	38
LD5	36	12	48
LD6	29	15	44
LD7	–	–	34
LD8	–	–	33
LD9	–	–	33
LD10	–	–	43
LD11	26	10	36
LD12	–	–	31
LD13	–	–	28
LD14	–	–	27
LD15	–	–	26
LD16	–	–	28
LD17	–	–	39
LD18	–	–	44
LD19	–	–	38
LD20	25	13	38
LD21	–	–	40
LD22	36	13	49
LD23	34	11	45
LD24	28	10	47
LD25	26	15	41
LD26	28	14	42
LD27	27	12	39
LD28	–	–	34
LD29	–	–	30
LD30	–	–	35
LD31	22	16	38
LD32	36	14	50
LD33	23	12	35
LD34	38	13	51
LD35	15	8	41
LD36	52	15	67
LD37	38	9	47
LD38	23	11	34
LD39	27	12	39
LD40	36	9	47
LD41	36	13	49
LD42	33	10	43
LD43	53	14	67
LD44	30	13	43
LD45	33	12	45
LD46	45	15	60
LD47	27	11	38
LD48	30	11	41
LD49	–	–	38
Totals	950	369	2,000
Estimated national delegates	0	0	78

=== Congressional district caucuses ===
Caucus date: May 17, 2008

National pledged delegates determined: 51 (of 78)

2008 Washington Democratic Congressional District Caucuses 0% of districts reporting
Congressional District	National Delegates Obama	National Delegates Clinton	National Delegates Total
CD1	4	2	6
CD2	4	2	6
CD3	3	2	5
CD4	2	1	3
CD5	3	2	5
CD6	4	2	6
CD7	7	2	9
CD8	4	2	6
CD9	3	2	5
Totals	34	17	51

=== State convention ===
Convention date: June 13–15, 2008

National pledged delegates determined: 27 (of 78)

Washington Democratic State Convention, 2008
Candidate	At-Large and PLEO delegates	Percentage	National delegates
Barack Obama	18	66.67%	52
Hillary Clinton	9	33.33%	26
Totals	27	100.00%	78

== See also ==
- 2008 Democratic Party presidential primaries
- 2008 Washington Republican presidential caucuses and primary
