= 2008 Rhode Island Democratic presidential primary =

- March 4, 2008

33 Democratic National Convention delegates (21 pledged, 12 unpledged)

Candidate	Hillary Clinton	Barack Obama
Home state	New York	Illinois
Delegate count	13	8
Popular vote	108,949	75,316
Percentage	58.44%	40.40%
- Clinton: 50–60% 60–70% 70–80% Obama: 50–60% 60–70%

The 2008 Rhode Island Democratic presidential primary took place on March 4, 2008. It was an open primary. 21 delegates were awarded on a proportional basis. Rhode Island's delegation to the 2008 Democratic National Convention also included 11 superdelegates whose votes were not bound by the results of the primary election. Hillary Clinton won the primary.

== Delegate breakdown ==
The Rhode Island Democratic Party sent a total of 32 delegates to the 2008 Democratic National Convention. Of those delegates, 21 were pledged, and 11 were unpledged. All of the 21 pledged delegates were allocated (pledged) to vote for a particular candidate at the National Convention according to the results of the Rhode Island Presidential Primary. The 11 unpledged delegates were popularly called "superdelegates" because their vote represented their personal decisions, whereas the regular delegates' votes represented the collective decision of many voters. The superdelegates were free to vote for any candidate at the National Convention and were selected by the Rhode Island Democratic Party's officials.

The 21 pledged delegates were further divided into 13 district delegates and 8 statewide delegates. The 13 district delegates were divided among Rhode Island's 19 Congressional Districts and were allocated to the presidential candidates based on the primary results in each District. Congressional District 1 chose 6 delegates and Congressional District 2 chose 7 delegates. The 8 statewide delegates were divided into 5 at-large delegates and 3 Party Leaders and Elected Officials (abbreviated PLEOs). They were allocated to the presidential candidates based on the primary results statewide.

Of the 11 unpledged delegates, 10 were selected in advance and 1 was selected at the State Executive Committee meeting on June 19, 2008. The delegates selected in advance were 6 Democratic National Committee members; the two Democratic U.S. Representatives from Rhode Island, Patrick J. Kennedy (District 1) and James Langevin (District 2); and both Democratic U.S. senators from Rhode Island, Jack Reed and Sheldon Whitehouse.

== Polling ==
On March 2, 2008, the most recent opinion polling of likely Democratic Primary participants showed Senator Clinton leading her opponent, Senator Barack Obama, 42% to 37%, with 22% undecided.

Among Rhode Island's 11 superdelegates, ten had endorsed a candidate by February 2. Eight had announced support for Senator Hillary Clinton, and two had committed to Senator Barack Obama.

== Results ==
Key:	Withdrew prior to contest

2008 Rhode Island Democratic presidential primary
Candidate	Votes	Percentage	Delegates
Hillary Clinton	108,949	58.44%	13
Barack Obama	75,316	40.40%	8
John Edwards	1,133	0.61%	0
Uncommitted	1,041	0.56%	0
Totals	186,439	100.00%	21

== See also ==
- 2008 Democratic Party presidential primaries
- 2008 Rhode Island Republican presidential primary
