= 2008 primaries =

This may refer to:

- Democratic Party (United States) presidential primaries, 2008
- Republican Party (United States) presidential primaries, 2008

See also:

- 2008 United States presidential election
