= 2008 United States presidential primaries =

The 2008 United States presidential primaries may refer to:

- 2008 Democratic Party presidential primaries
- 2008 Republican Party presidential primaries
