= 2008 Rhode Island Republican presidential primary =

- March 4, 2008

20 delegates to the Republican National Convention (17 pledged, 3 unpledged)

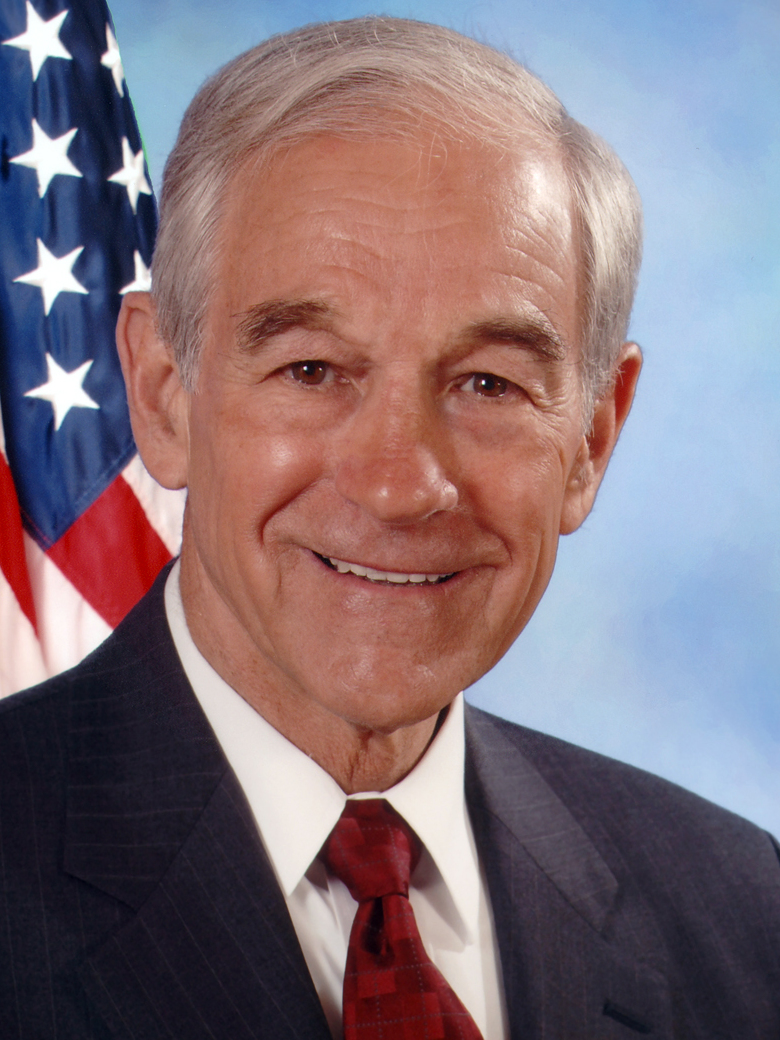
Candidate	John McCain	Mike Huckabee	Ron Paul
Home state	Arizona	Arkansas	Texas
Delegate count	13	4	0
Popular vote	17,480	5,847	1,777
Percentage	64.75%	21.66%	6.58%
- John McCain

The 2008 Rhode Island Republican presidential primary took place on March 4, 2008.

== Results ==
100% of precincts reporting
Candidate	Votes	Percentage	Delegates
John McCain	17,480	64.75%	13
Mike Huckabee	5,847	21.66%	4
Ron Paul	1,777	6.58%	0
Mitt Romney*	1,181	4.37%	0
Alan Keyes	117	0.43%	0
Hugh Cort*	24	0.09%	0
Uncommitted	570	2.11%	0
Total	26,996	100%	17

* Candidate dropped out of the race before March 4.

== See also ==
- 2008 Republican Party presidential primaries
- 2008 Rhode Island Democratic presidential primary
