= 2008 Nebraska Republican presidential primary =

- May 13, 2008
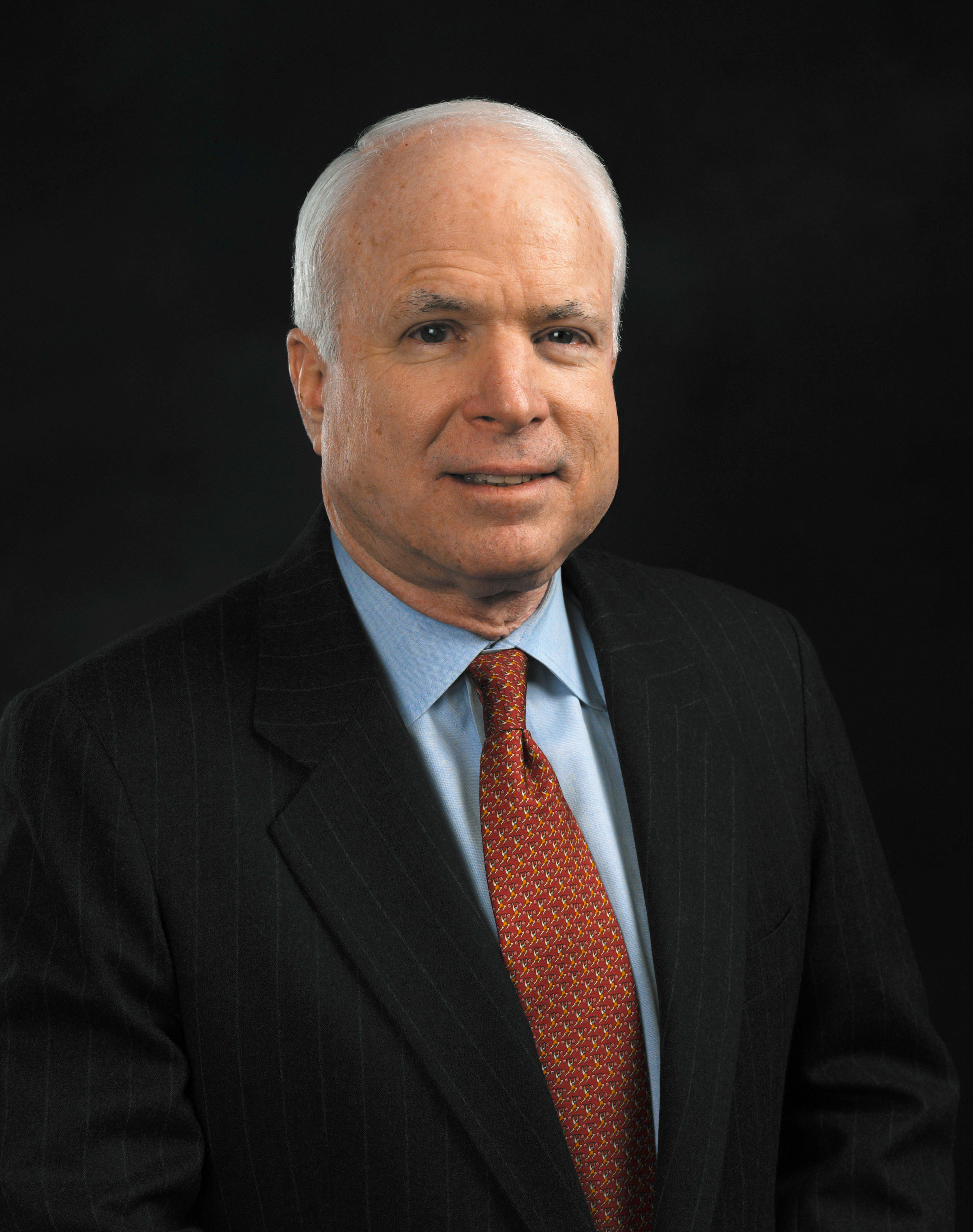

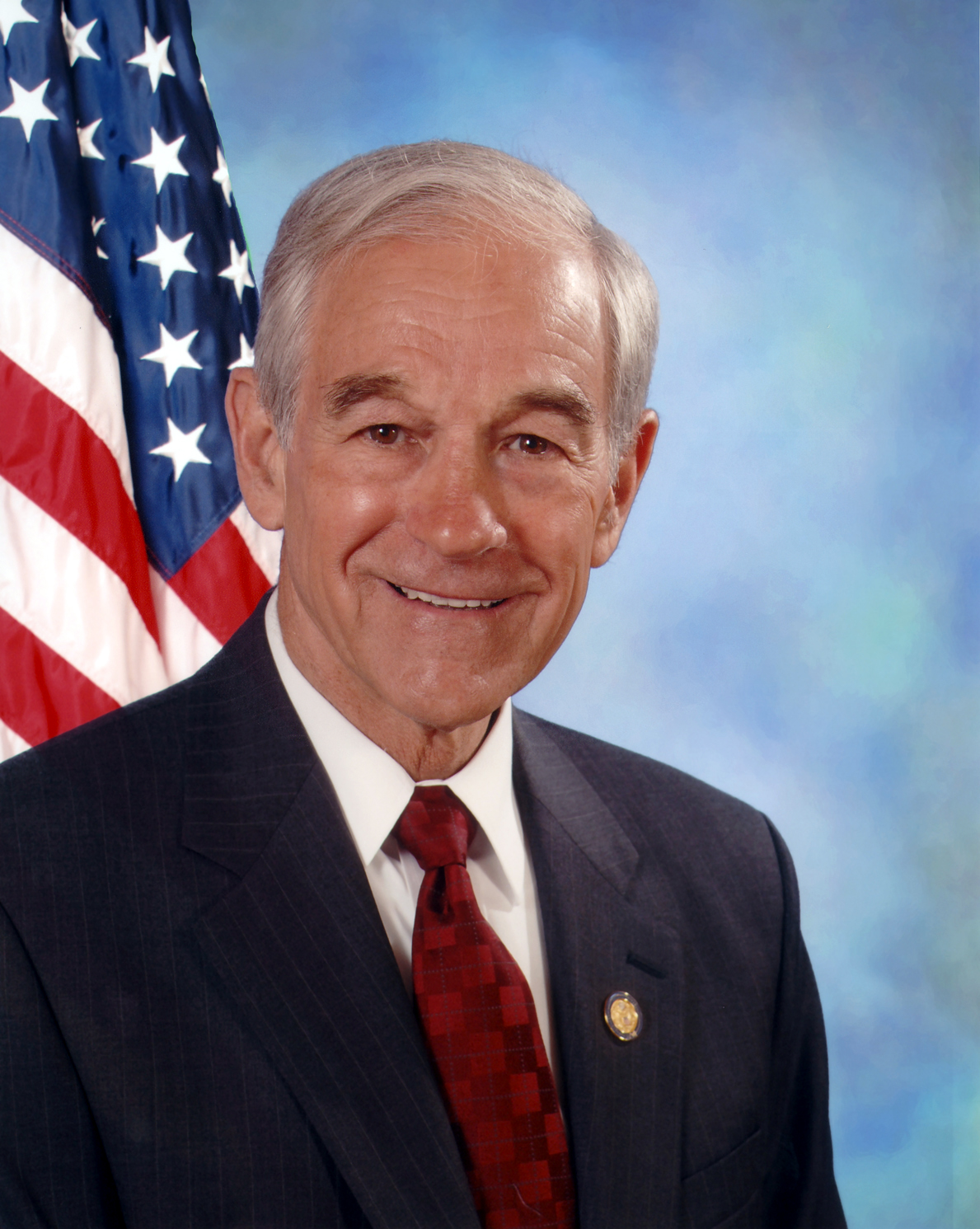
Candidate	John McCain	Ron Paul
Party	Republican	Republican
Home state	Arizona	Texas
Delegate count	0	0
Popular vote	118,065	17,647
Percentage	87.00%	13.00%
- County results John McCain

The 2008 Nebraska Republican presidential primary took place on May 13, 2008. John McCain won the primary, although he had secured his party's nomination weeks before the election through his performance in earlier primary contests.

The Nebraska primary was non-binding and only indicated Republican voters' preference for president. Nebraska Republicans' State Convention ultimately chose the delegates to the 2008 Republican National Convention, who formally nominated the Republican candidate for the presidency. The State Convention took place on July 12. Delegates to the state convention were elected at county conventions held between the first and tenth of June. Predictably, nearly all of the delegates chosen by the state convention were McCain supporters, although "at least one" delegate was a supporter of Ron Paul.

== Results ==
100% of precincts reporting
Candidate	Votes	Percentage	Delegates
John McCain	118,065	87.00%	0
Ron Paul	17,647	13.00%	0
Total	135,712	100%	0

== See also ==
- 2008 Nebraska Democratic presidential caucuses
- 2008 Republican Party presidential primaries
