= 2008 Northern Mariana Islands Republican presidential caucuses =

- February 23, 2008
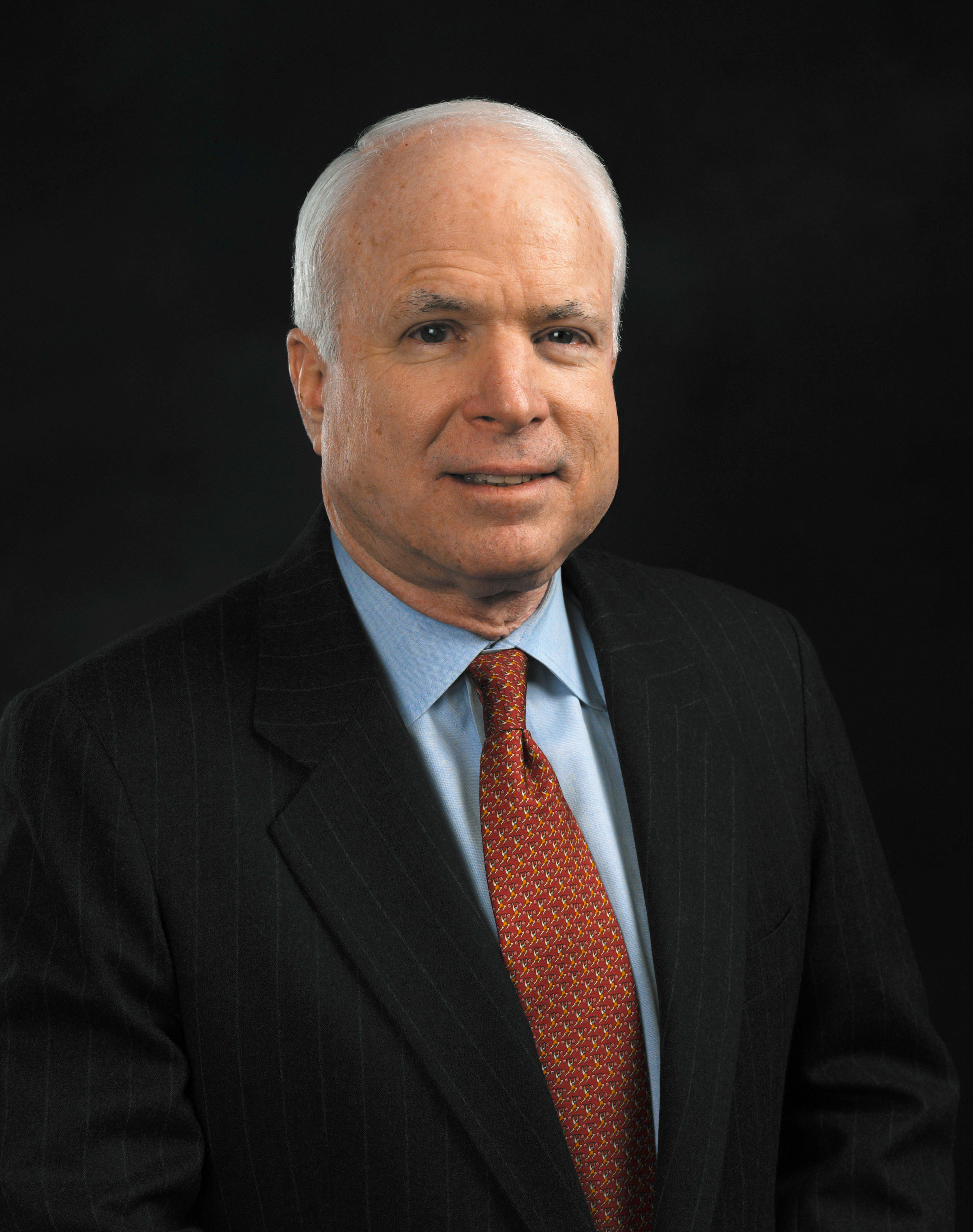

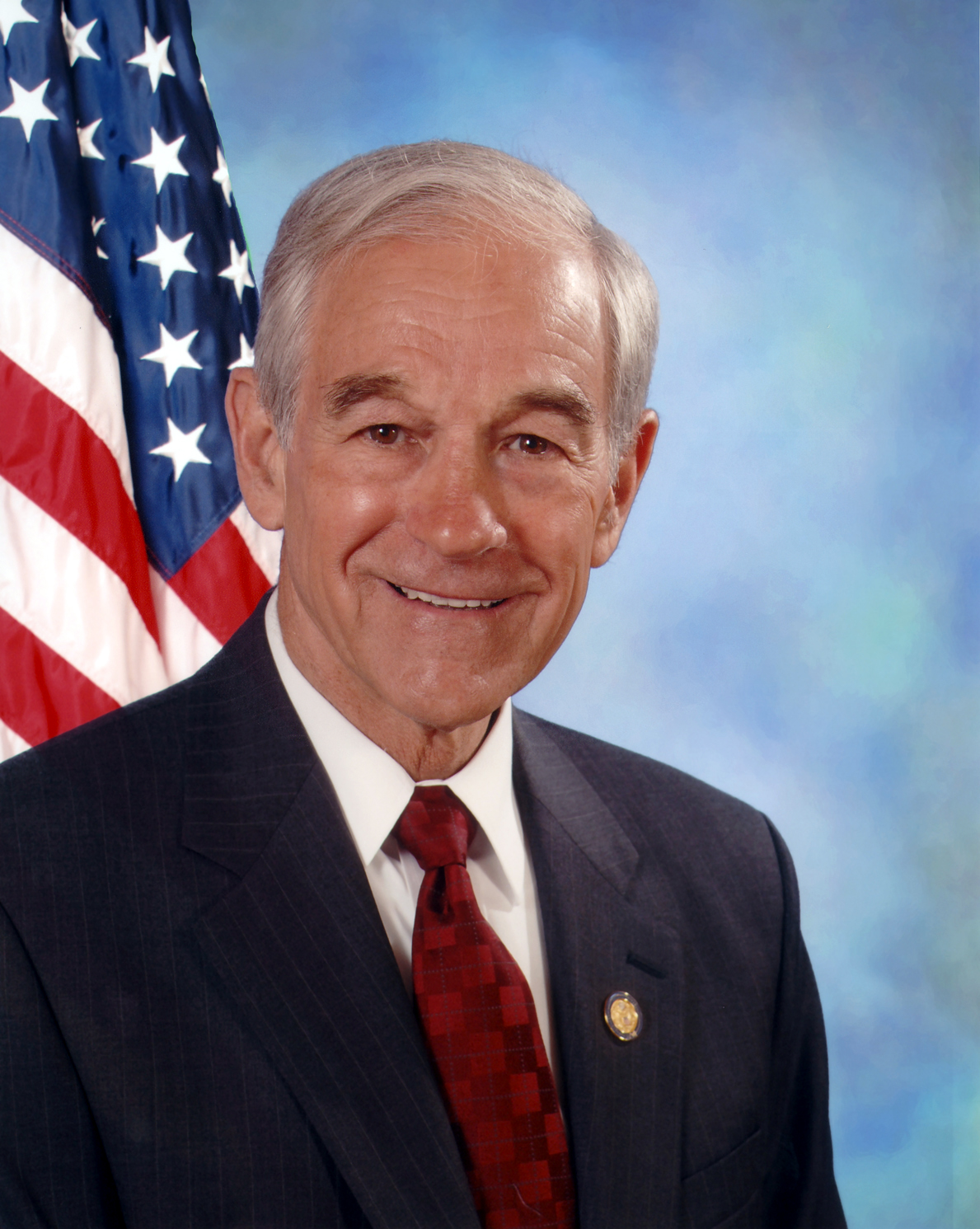
Candidate	John McCain	Mike Huckabee	Ron Paul
Party	Republican	Republican	Republican
Home state	Arizona	Arkansas	Texas
Delegate count	9	0	0
Popular vote	105	5	5
Percentage	91.30%	4.35%	4.35%

The 2008 Northern Mariana Islands Republican presidential caucuses took place on February 23, 2008. John McCain won all 6 pledged (and the support of 3 unpledged delegates) at the commonwealth's convention.

== Results ==
Candidate	Votes	Percentage	Delegates
John McCain	105	91.30%	9
Mike Huckabee	5	4.35%	0
Ron Paul	5	4.35%	0
Total	115	100%	9

== See also ==
- Republican Party (United States) presidential primaries, 2008
- Republican Party presidential debates, 2012
- Republican Party presidential primaries, 2012
- Results of the 2012 Republican Party presidential primaries
