= 2008 South Dakota Democratic presidential primary =

- June 3, 2008

Candidate	Hillary Clinton	Barack Obama
Home state	New York	Illinois
Delegate count	9	6
Popular vote	54,128	43,669
Percentage	55.35%	44.65%
- Primary results by county Clinton: 50–60% 60–70% Obama: 50–60% 60–70%

The 2008 South Dakota Democratic presidential primary took place on June 3, 2008. Along with Montana, it was one of the final two elections in the 2008 primary season. Senator Hillary Clinton won the primary, but on the same day, her opponent Barack Obama secured enough delegate votes for the 2008 Democratic National Convention to ensure his eventual nomination for President by the Democratic Party.

South Dakota has 66 counties with 762 election precincts.

== Polling ==
A poll published April 3, 2008 indicated that Obama was supported by more respondents, 46%, than Clinton, who received the support of 34%. However, a May 31-June 1, 2008 poll by ARG projected a Clinton victory in South Dakota, with 60% of respondents supporting her versus 34% supporting Obama.

== Results ==
Early on the day of the primary, hours before polls closed, the Associated Press projected Barack Obama's nomination for the presidency. The projection was based on the declarations of a large number Democratic superdelegates, as well as exit polls of voters in South Dakota and Montana. However, the AP calculated that Obama would be the Democratic nominee even if he lost the primaries in South Dakota and Montana.

Key:	Withdrew prior to contest

2008 South Dakota Democratic presidential primary
Candidate	Votes	Percentage	Delegates
Hillary Clinton	54,128	55.35%	9
Barack Obama	43,669	44.65%	6
Total	97,797	100.00%	15

== See also ==
- 2008 Democratic Party presidential primaries
- 2008 South Dakota Republican presidential primary
