= 2008 New Mexico Democratic presidential primary =

- February 5, 2008

Candidate	Hillary Clinton	Barack Obama
Home state	New York	Illinois
Delegate count	14	12
Popular vote	73,105	71,396
Percentage	49.00%	47.86%
- Primary results by county Clinton: 40–50% 50–60% 60–70% 70–80% Obama: 40–50% 50–60%

The 2008 New Mexico Democratic presidential primary took place on February 5, 2008, with 26 national delegates at stake.

On February 12, 2008, counting was officially finished and Hillary Clinton was declared the winner.

== Process ==
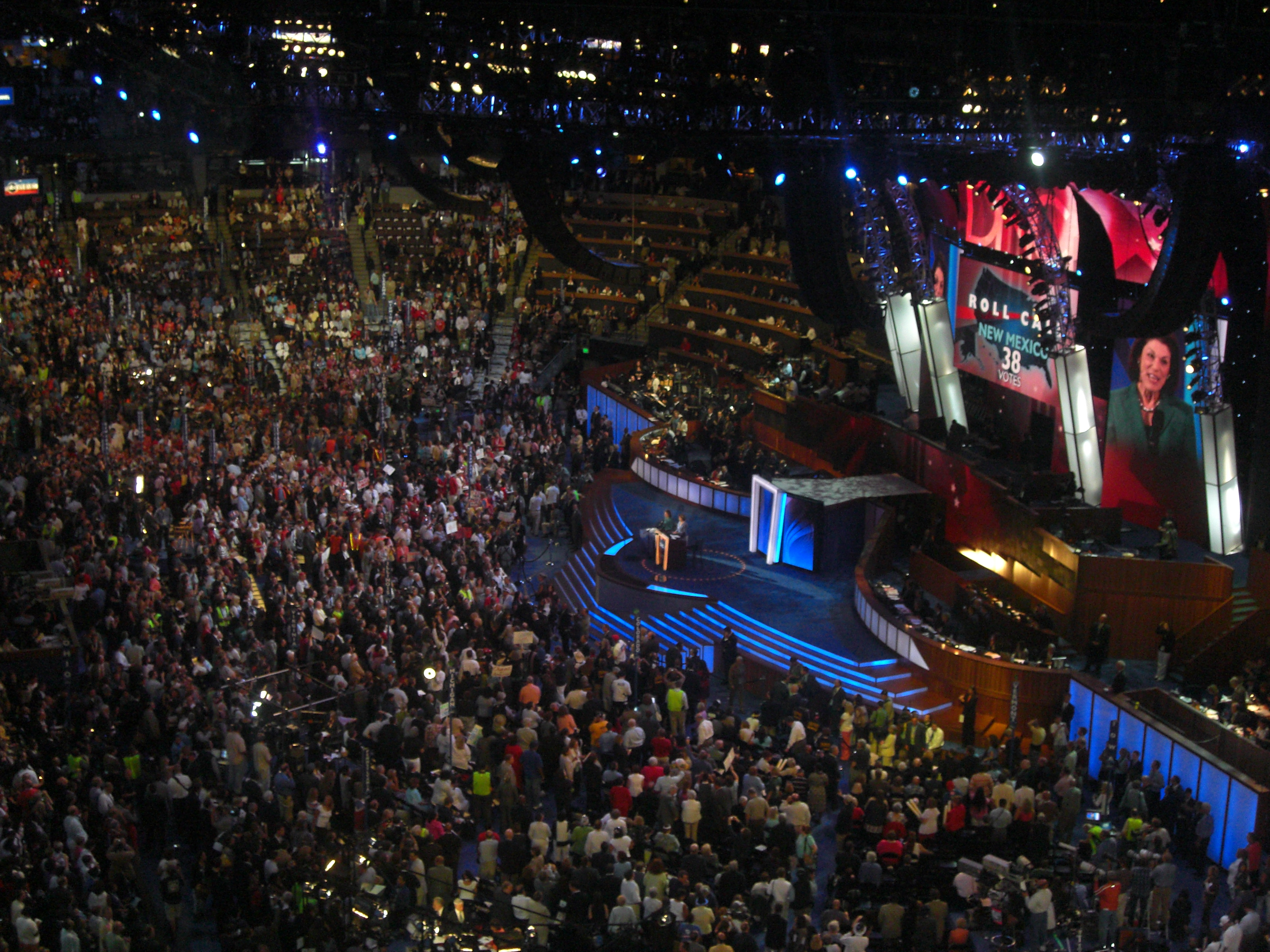
New Mexico is announced as part of the roll call of the states during the third day of the 2008 Democratic National Convention in Denver, Colorado. Rather than announcing its distribution of delegate votes, the state would yield to Illinois, which would in turn yield to New York as part of an effort to promote party unity.

Although mass media called New Mexico's nominating contest as a caucus, the format was that of a party-run closed primary. Eligible voters included all registered Democrats as of January 4, 2008. Voting occurred between 12 noon and 7 PM Mountain Standard Time. Absentee ballots were available to any voter and were required to be returned by January 28. Delegates were then apportioned based on the results of the primary at the statewide and Congressional district levels, and were formally elected at district and state conventions in April based on the primary results.

== Polls ==
Final Polling
Pollster	Barack Obama	Hillary Clinton	Bill Richardson	John Edwards
NM State University	48%	42%	-	-
NM State University	19%	23%	33%	18%
American Research Group	22%	17%	28%	12%

== Results ==
Key:	Withdrew prior to contest

New Mexico Democratic presidential primary, 2008
Candidate	Votes	Percentage	Estimated national delegates
Hillary Clinton	73,105	49.00%	14
Barack Obama	71,396	47.86%	12
John Edwards	2,157	1.45%	0
Bill Richardson	1,305	0.87%	0
Dennis Kucinich	574	0.38%	0
Joe Biden	122	0.08%	0
Chris Dodd	81	0.05%	0
Uncommitted	441	0.30%	0
Totals	149,181	100.00%	26

== See also ==
- 2008 Democratic Party presidential primaries
- 2008 New Mexico Republican primary
