= 2008 New Mexico Republican presidential primary =

- June 3, 2008
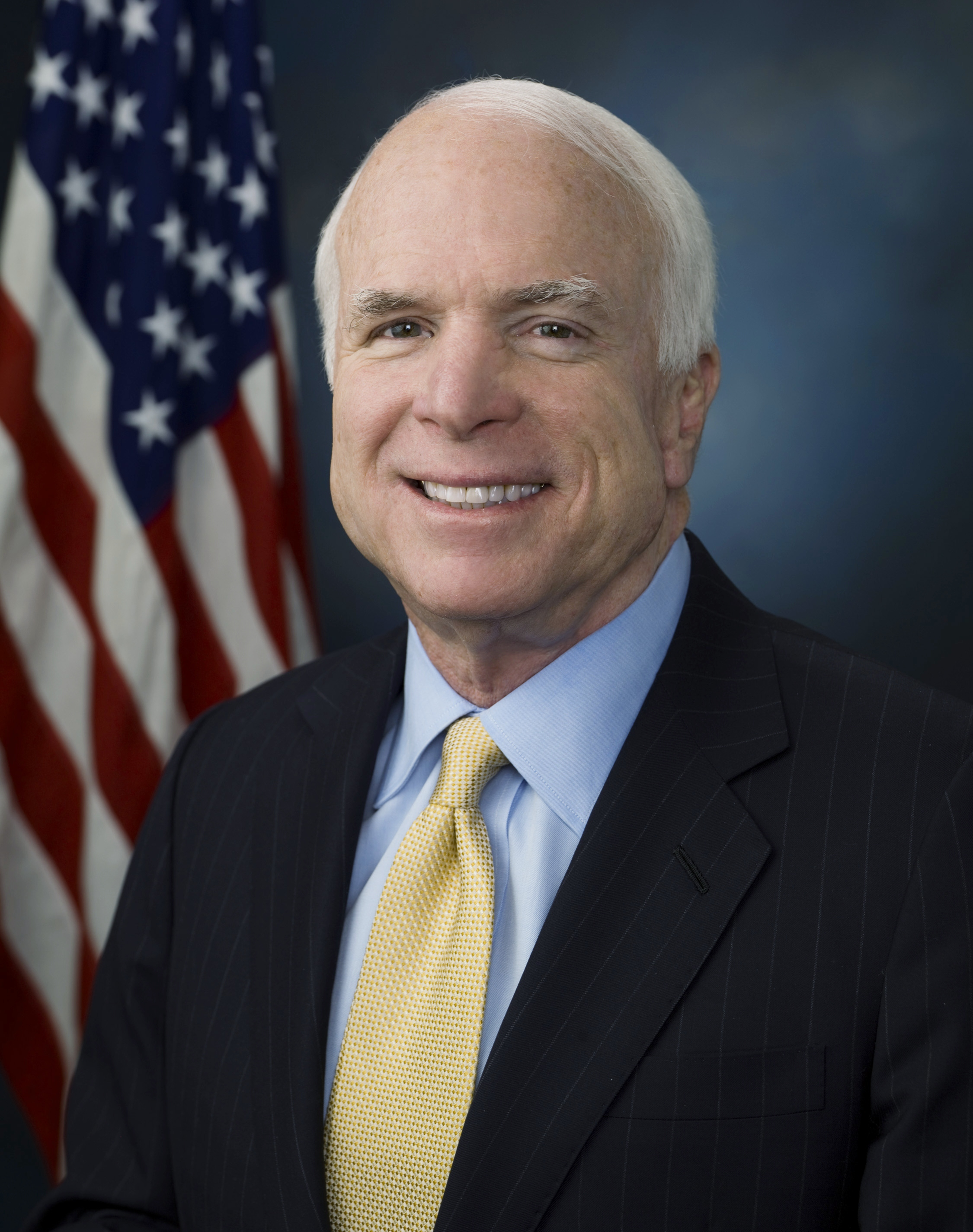

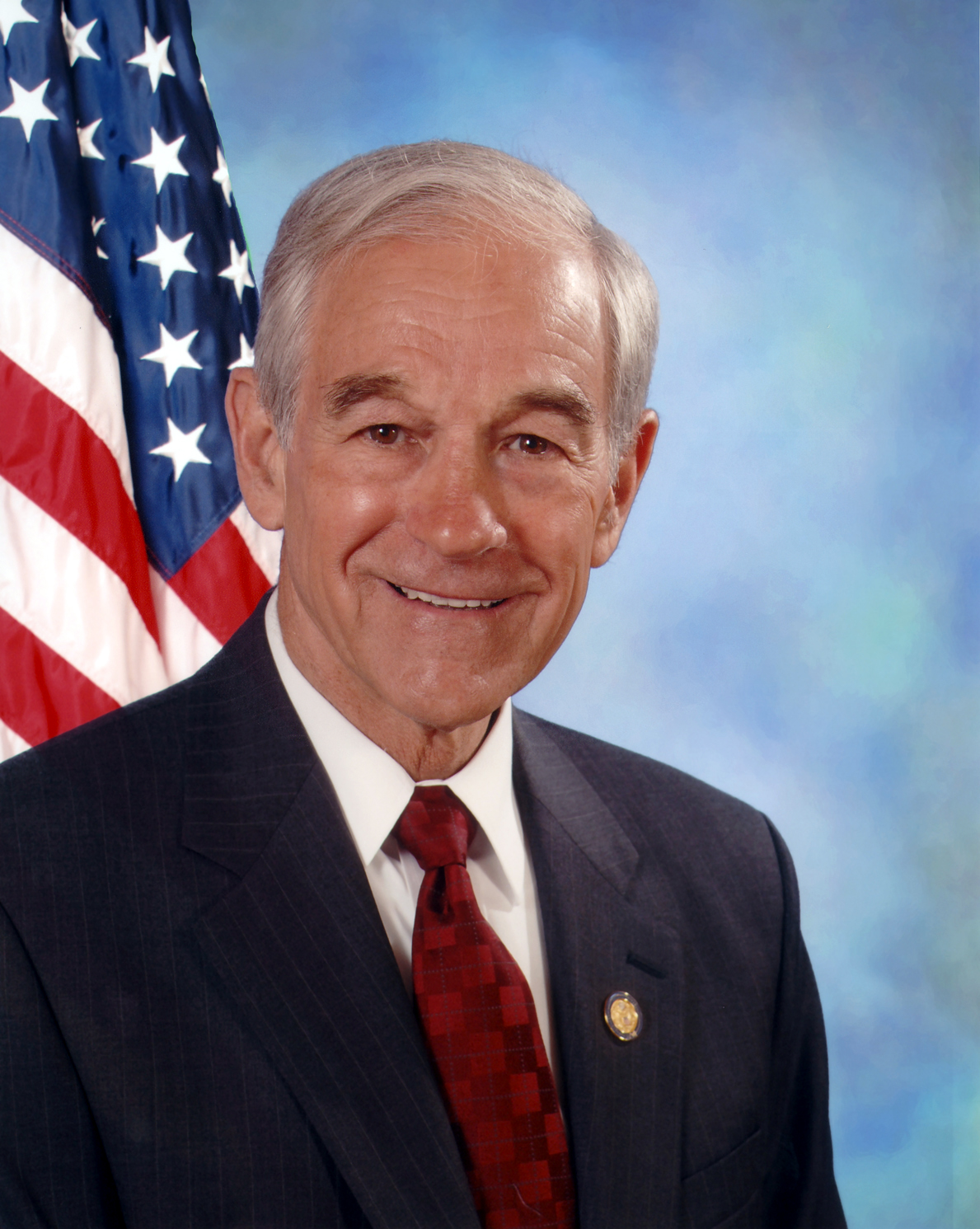
Candidate	John McCain	Ron Paul
Party	Republican	Republican
Home state	Arizona	Texas
Delegate count	29	0
Popular vote	95,378	15,561
Percentage	85.97%	14.03%
- Election results by county. John McCain

The 2008 New Mexico Republican presidential primary took place on June 3, 2008. All 29 National delegates were awarded to John McCain.

== Results ==
100% of precincts reporting
Candidate	Popular Vote	Percentage	Delegates
John McCain	95,378	85.97%	29
Ron Paul	15,561	14.03%	0
Total	110,939	100.00%	29

== See also ==
- 2008 New Mexico Democratic primary
- 2008 Republican Party presidential primaries
