= 2008 Vermont Republican presidential primary =

- March 4, 2008

17 pledged delegates to the Republican National Convention delegates

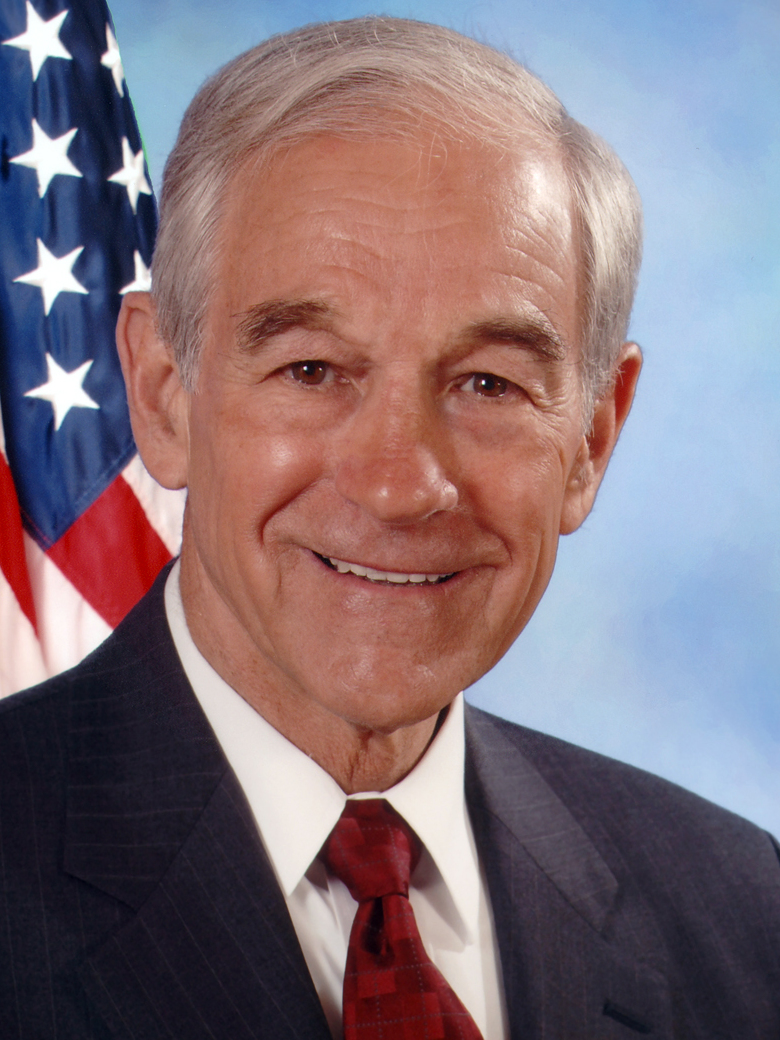
| Candidate | John McCain | Mike Huckabee | Ron Paul |
| Home state | Arizona | Arkansas | Texas |
| Delegate count | 17 | 0 | 0 |
| Popular vote | 28,417 | 5,698 | 2,635 |
| Percentage | 71.32% | 14.30% | 6.61% |
- Election results by municipality. John McCain Mike Huckabee No votes

The 2008 Vermont Republican presidential primary took place on March 4, 2008. Arizona Senator John McCain was the winner of the primary.

== Results ==
Official Results
| Candidate | Popular vote | | Delegates |
| Candidate | # | % | Delegates |
|---|---|---|---|
| John McCain | 28,417 | 71.32% | 17 |
| Mike Huckabee | 5,698 | 14.30% | 0 |
| Ron Paul | 2,635 | 6.61% | 0 |
| Mitt Romney* | 1,809 | 4.45% | 0 |
| Rudy Giuliani* | 931 | 2.24% | 0 |
| Write-in | 353 | 0.89% | 0 |
| Total | 39,843 | 100% | 17 |

* Candidate dropped out of the race before the primary

== See also ==
- 2008 Republican Party presidential primaries
- 2008 Vermont Democratic presidential primary
