= 2008 South Dakota Republican presidential primary =

- June 3, 2008

27 delegates to the Republican National Convention (24 pledged, 3 unpledged)

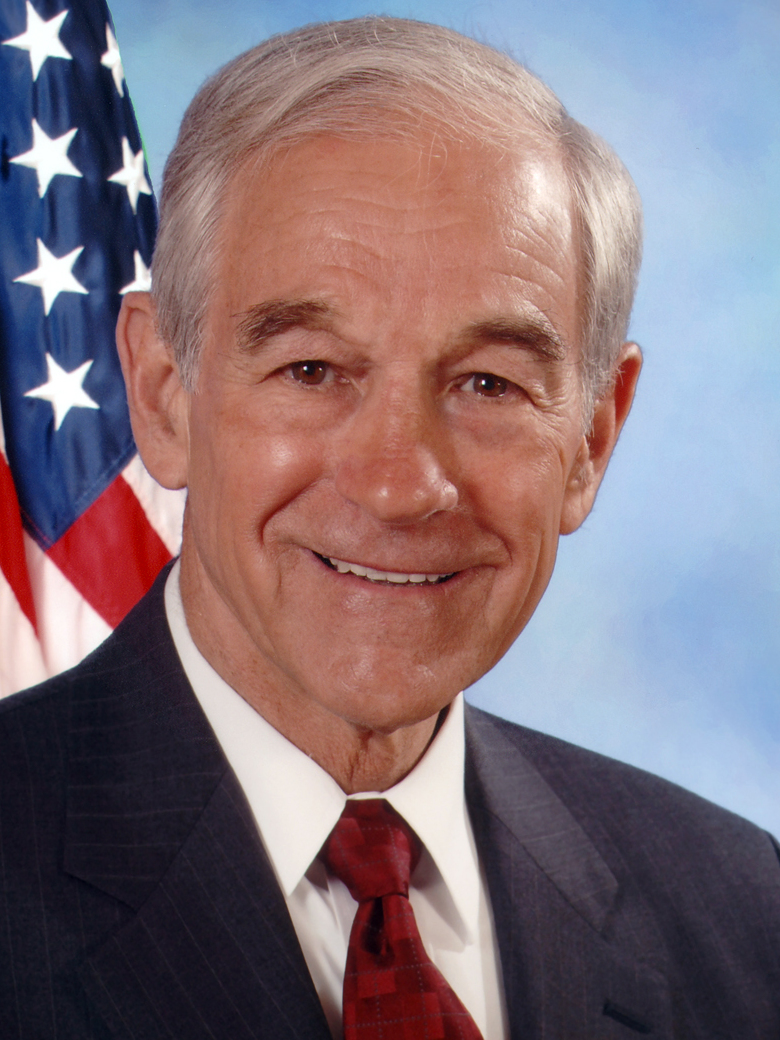

Candidate	John McCain	Ron Paul	Mike Huckabee (withdrawn)
Home state	Arizona	Texas	Arkansas
Delegate count	24	0	0
Popular vote	42,778	10,072	4,328
Percentage	70.18%	16.52%	7.10%
- Election results by county.

The 2008 South Dakota Republican presidential primary took place on June 3, 2008.

== Results ==
2008 South Dakota Republican presidential primary
Candidate	Popular vote		Delegates
Candidate	Count	Percentage	Delegates
John McCain	42,788	70.19%	24
Ron Paul	10,072	16.52%	0
Mike Huckabee (withdrawn)	4,328	7.10%	0
Mitt Romney (withdrawn)	1,990	3.26%	0
Uncommitted	1,786	2.93%	0
Total	60,964	100%	24

== See also ==
- 2008 South Dakota Democratic presidential primary
- 2008 Republican Party presidential primaries
