= 2008 Republican Party presidential primaries =

Selection of Republican US presidential candidate

- January 3 to June 3, 2008

2,173 delegates to the Republican National Convention 1,087 (majority) votes needed to win
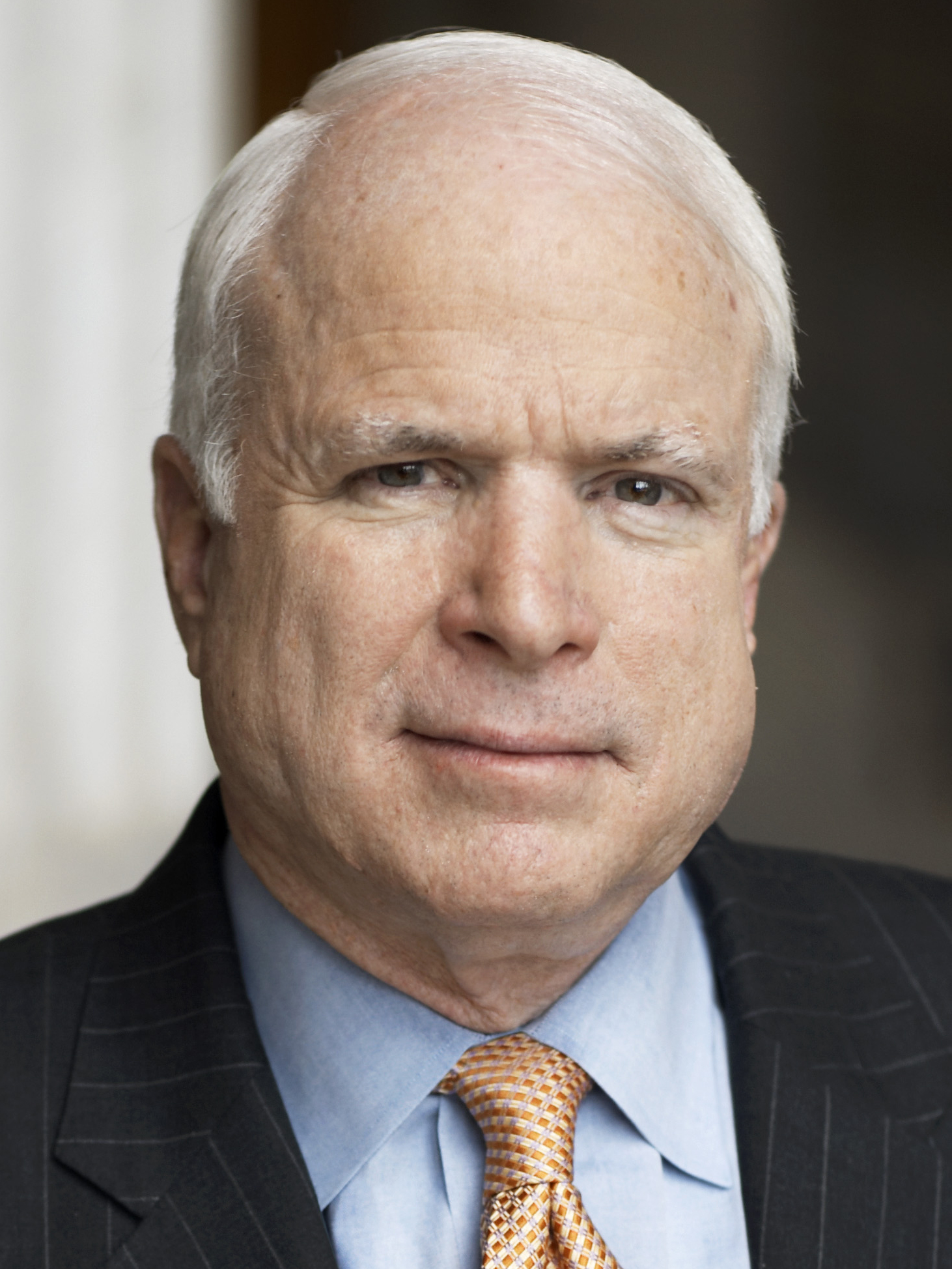

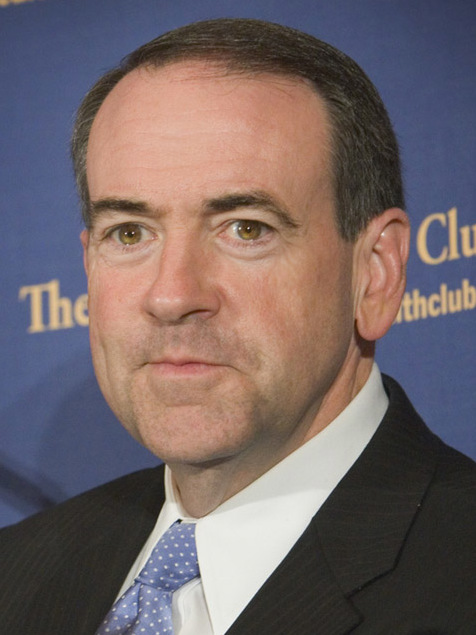

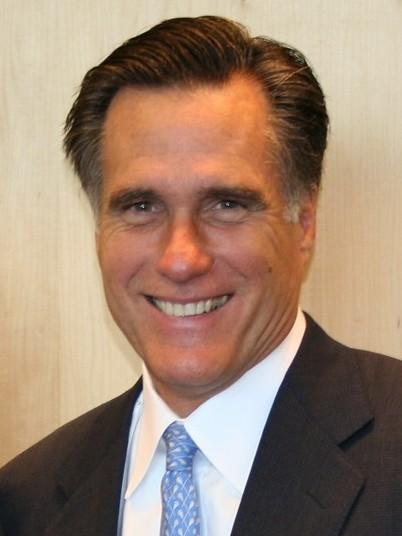

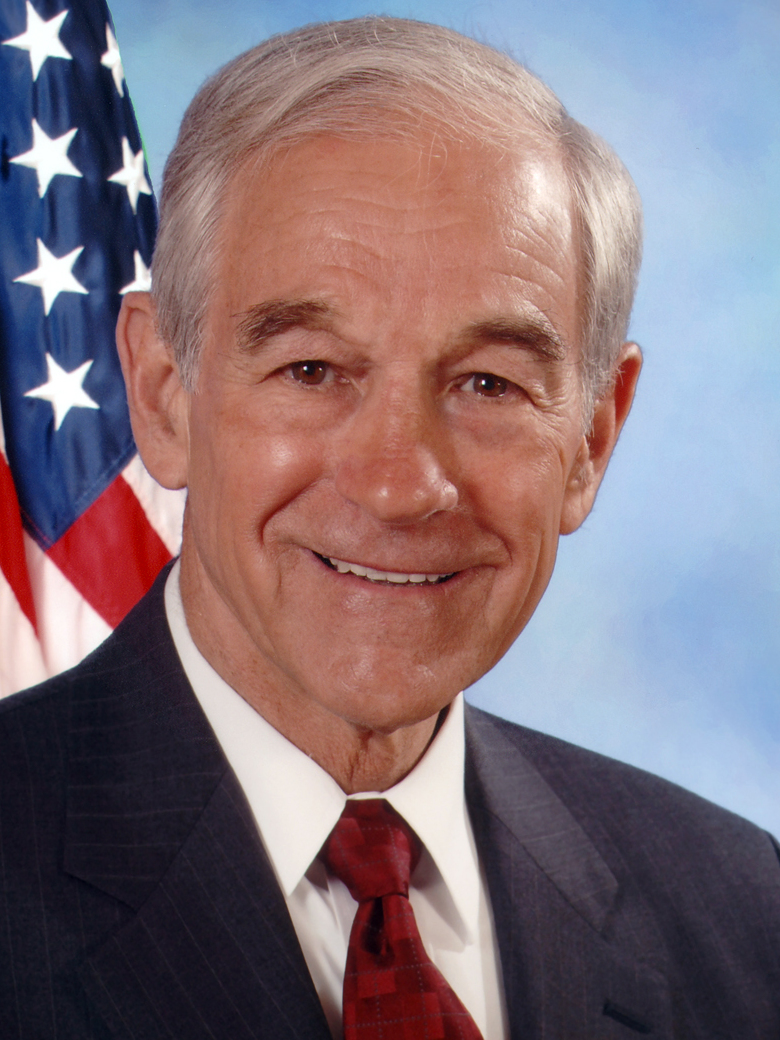
Candidate	John McCain	Mike Huckabee
Home state	Arizona	Arkansas
Delegate count	1,575	278
Contests won	37	8
Popular vote	9,902,797	4,276,046
Percentage	46.7%	20.1%
Candidate	Mitt Romney	Ron Paul
Home state	Massachusetts	Texas
Delegate count	271	35
Contests won	11	0
Popular vote	4,699,788	1,160,403
Percentage	22.2%	5.6%
First place by popular vote and plurality of delegates
John McCain (37)
Mitt Romney (11)
Mike Huckabee (8)
Previous Republican nominee
George W. Bush
Republican nominee
John McCain

From January 3 to June 3, 2008, voters of the Republican Party chose their nominee for president in the 2008 United States presidential election. Senator John McCain of Arizona was selected as the nominee through a series of primary elections and caucuses culminating in the 2008 Republican National Convention held from Monday, September 1, through Thursday, September 4, 2008, in Saint Paul, Minnesota. President George W. Bush was ineligible to be elected to a third term due to the term limits established by the 22nd Amendment.

In a crowded primary of several prominent Republicans eyeing the nomination, former New York City mayor Rudy Giuliani was the early frontrunner. However, former Arkansas Governor Mike Huckabee won the Iowa Caucuses as he gained momentum just two months prior to the primary. Moderate U.S. Senator and former presidential candidate John McCain won the New Hampshire and Florida primaries. After failing to win in Florida, Giuliani ended his campaign.

McCain ultimately won the nomination after winning most of the primaries on Super Tuesday. He was officially nominated at the 2008 Republican National Convention on September 4, 2008, but went on to lose the general election to Barack Obama.

== Candidates ==
Notes for the following table: Delegate counts is the final estimated delegate count.

=== Nominee ===
The vast majority of primaries were of the "winner-take-all" variety, and convention rules meant that no one with less than five states in their "pockets" would be allowed to have their names placed in nomination. This guaranteed that the primary season would be very short. McCain won New Hampshire, South Carolina and Florida and thus became nearly unstoppable. After decisive victories on super Tuesday and the potomac primary McCain became the presumptive nominee. Candidates are listed by delegate counts.

Candidate	Most recent office	Home state	Estimated delegate count (RCP)	Candidacy	Delegations with plurality	Running mate
John McCain	U.S. Senator from Arizona (1987–2018)	Arizona	1,575; 72.5%	Secured nomination: March 4, 2008 (Campaign)	31; NH, SC, FL, NY, CA, IL, MO, OK, CT, AR, NJ, DE; WA, VA, MD, WI, VT, RI, OH, TX, MS, PA, IN; NC, NE, HI, KY, OR, ID, SD, NM; Non-states: DC, PR, MP, AS, VI, GU	Sarah Palin

=== Withdrew during primaries ===
Candidate	Most recent office	Home state	Estimated delegate count (RCP)	Candidacy	Delegations with plurality
Mike Huckabee	Governor of Arkansas (1996–2007)	Arkansas	278; 12.8%	Withdrew: March 4, 2008 (Campaign)	8 AL, AR, GA, IA, WV, TN; KS, LA
Mitt Romney	Governor of Massachusetts (2003–2007)	Massachusetts	271; 12.5%	Withdrew: February 7, 2008 (Campaign)	11; MI, NV, WY, ME, MA, MT; UT, MN, CO, ND, AK
Ron Paul	U.S. Representative from Texas (1976–1977, 1979–1985, 1997–2013)	Texas	35; 1.6%	Lost nomination: June 12, 2008 (Campaign)	0
Fred Thompson	U.S. Senator from Tennessee (1994–2003)	Tennessee	11; 0.5%	Withdrew: January 22, 2008 (Campaign)	0
Alan Keyes	Asst. Secretary of State for International Organization Affairs (1985–1987)	Maryland	2	Withdrew: April 15, 2008 (Campaign)	0
Duncan Hunter	U.S. Representative for California's 52nd (1993–2009)	California	1	Withdrew: January 19, 2008 (Campaign)	0
Rudy Giuliani	Mayor of New York City (1994–2001)	New York	0	Withdrew: January 30, 2008 (Campaign)	0

=== Withdrew before primaries ===
Candidate	Most recent office	Home state	Estimated delegate count (RCP)	Candidacy	Delegations with plurality
Sam Brownback	U.S. Senator from Kansas (1996–2011)	Kansas	0	Withdrew: October 19, 2007 (Campaign)	0
John H. Cox	Founder of Cox Financial Group Ltd.	Illinois	0	Withdrew: December 2007 (Campaign)	0
Jim Gilmore	Governor of Virginia (1998–2002)	Virginia	0	Withdrew: July 14, 2007 (Campaign)	0
Tom Tancredo	U.S. Representative for Colorado's 6th (1999–2009)	Colorado	0	Withdrew: December 20, 2007 (Campaign)	0
Tommy Thompson	United States Secretary of Health and Human Services (2001–2005)	Wisconsin	0	Withdrew: August 12, 2007 (Campaign)	0

=== Declined to run ===
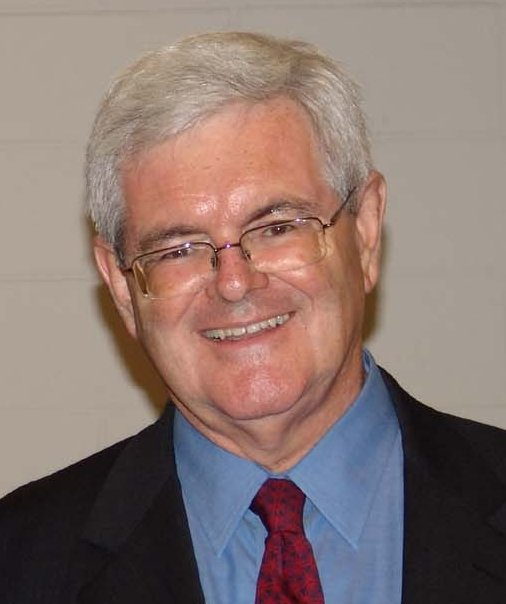
Newt Gingrich, former Speaker of the House from Georgia

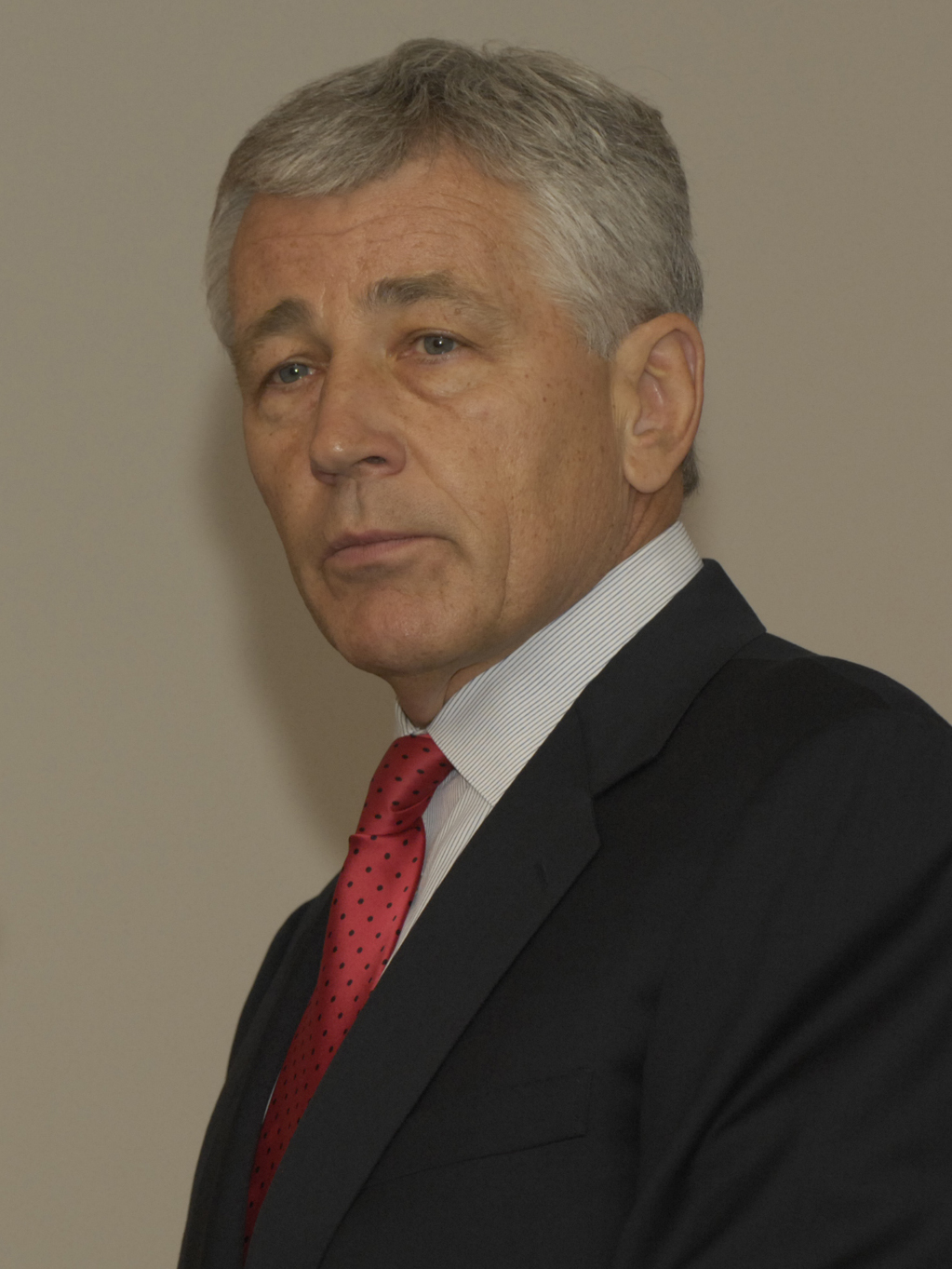
Chuck Hagel, Senator from Nebraska

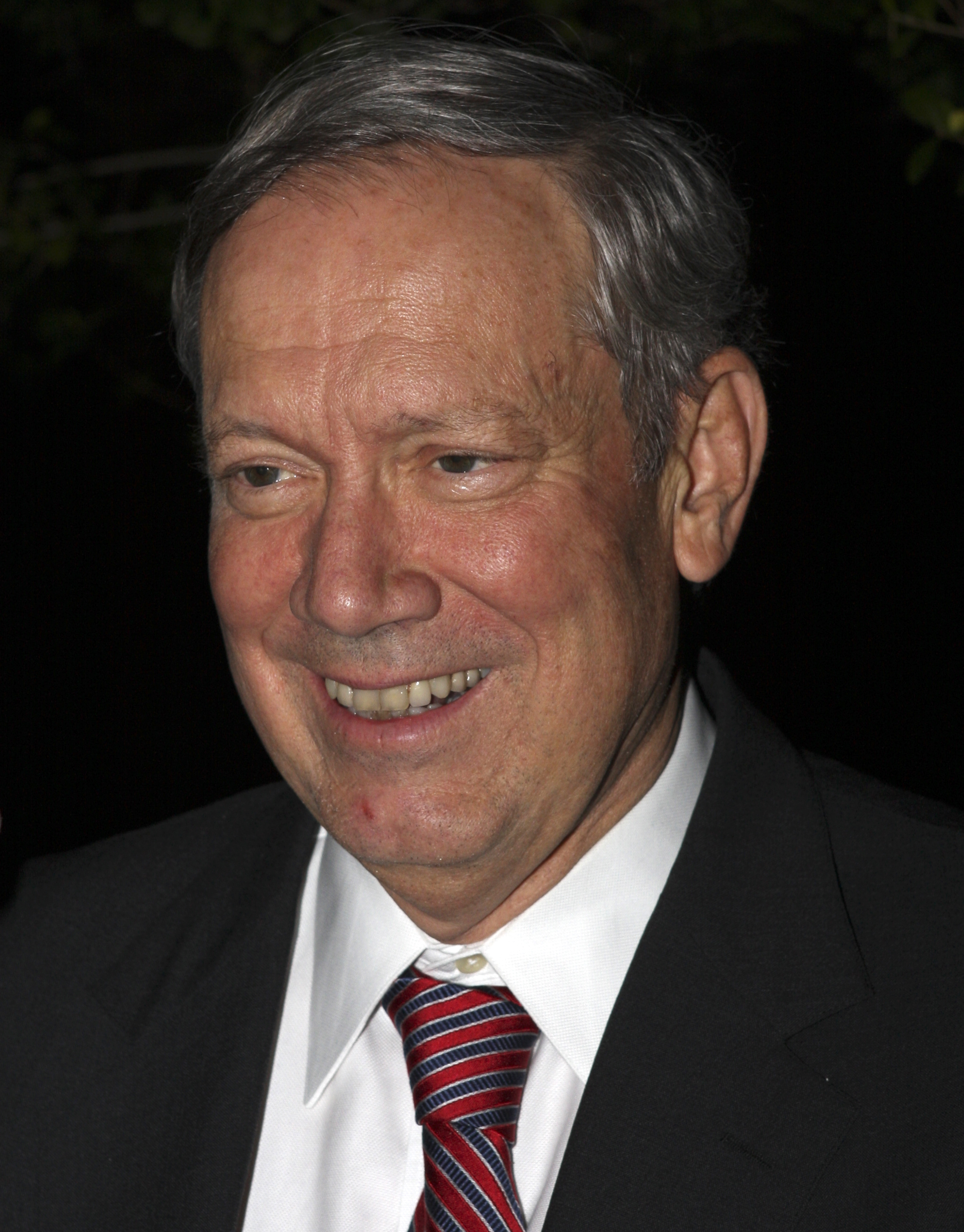
George Pataki, former Governor of New York

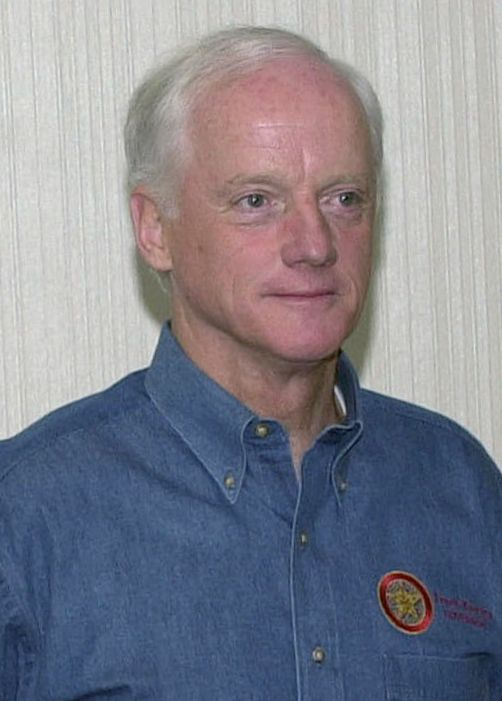
Frank Keating, former Governor of Oklahoma

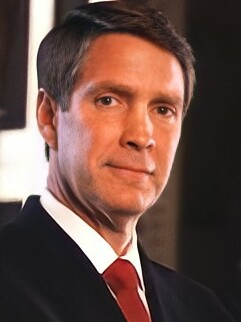
Bill Frist, former Senator from Tennessee

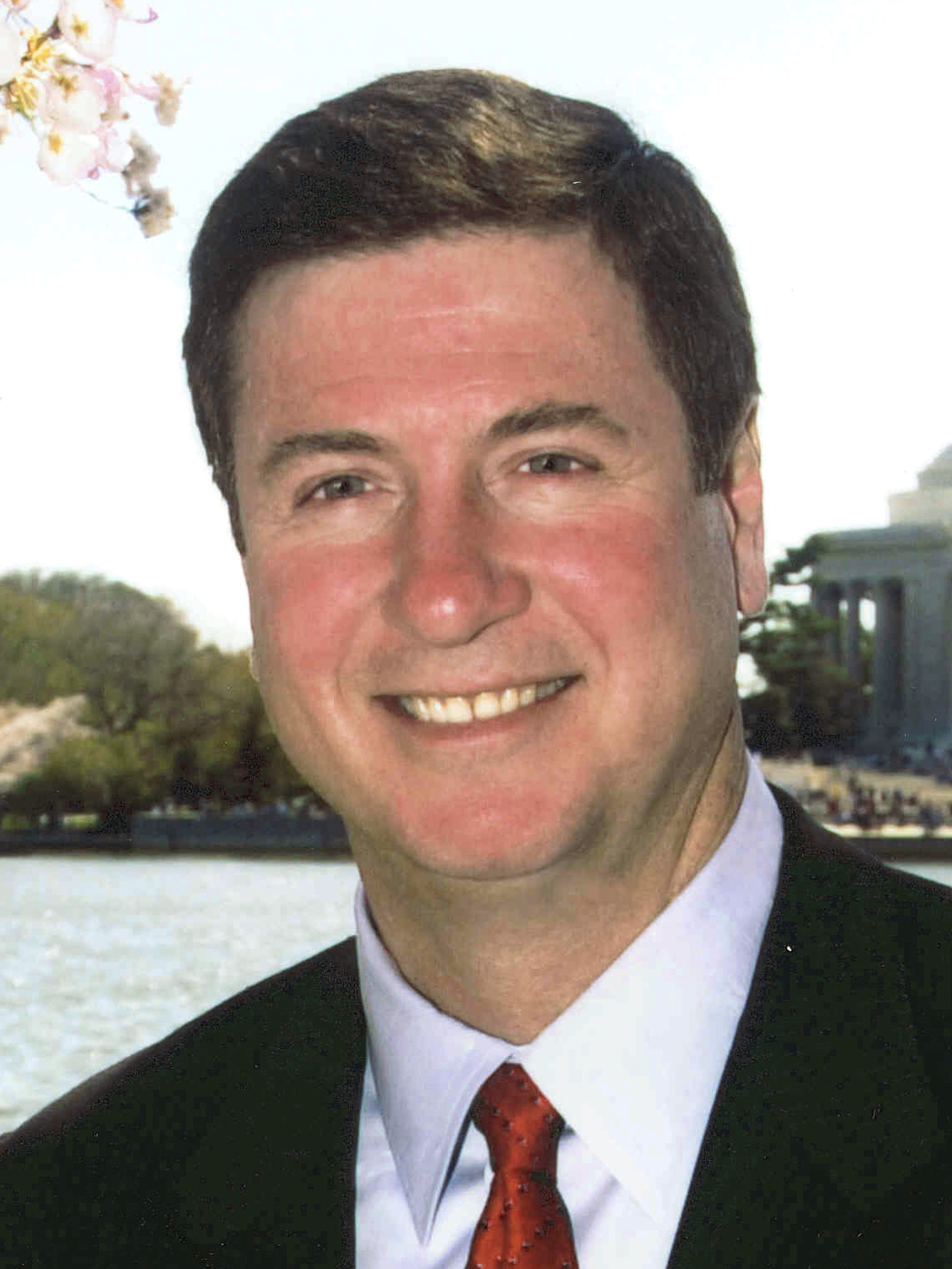
George Allen, former Senator from Virginia

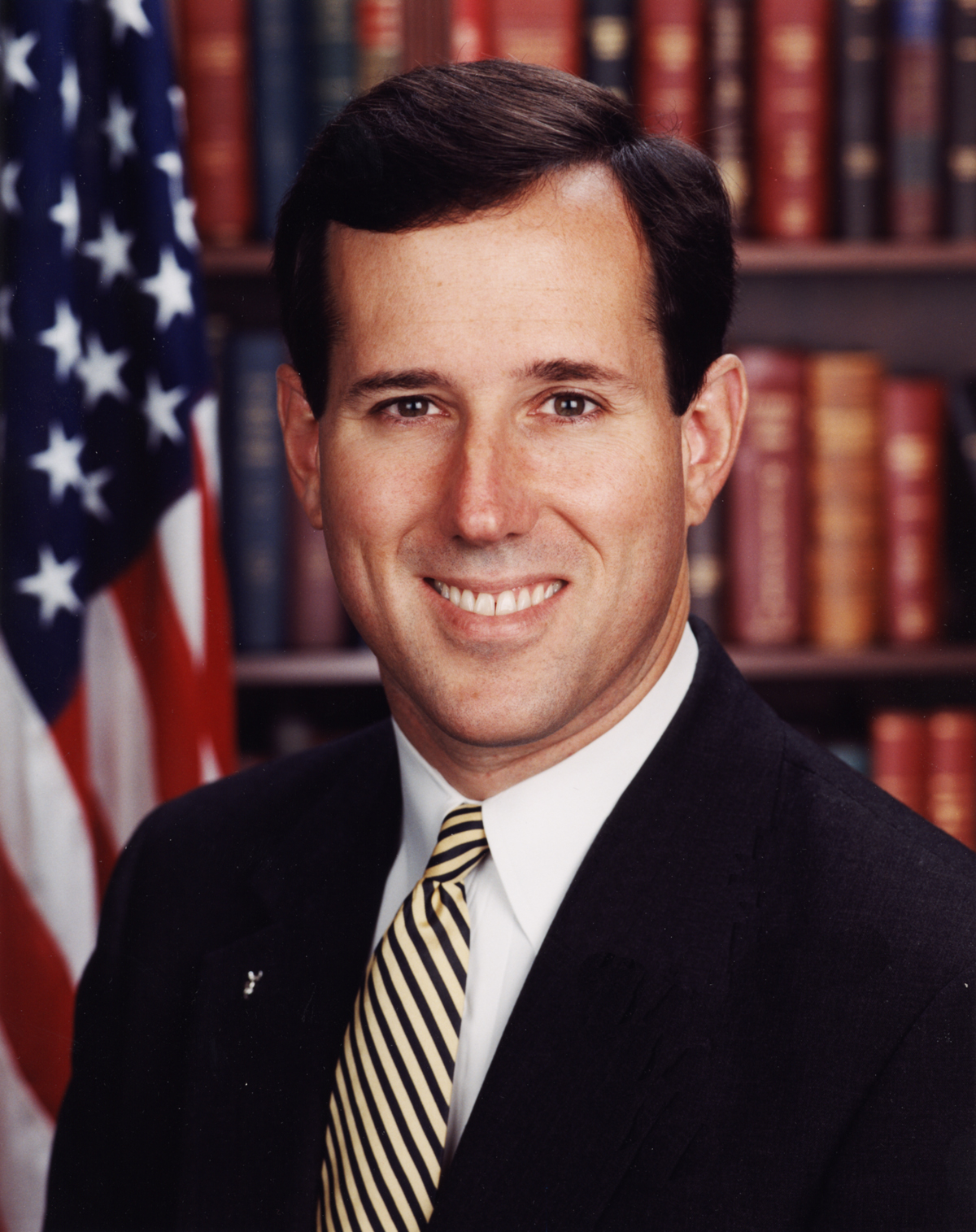
Rick Santorum, former Senator from Pennsylvania

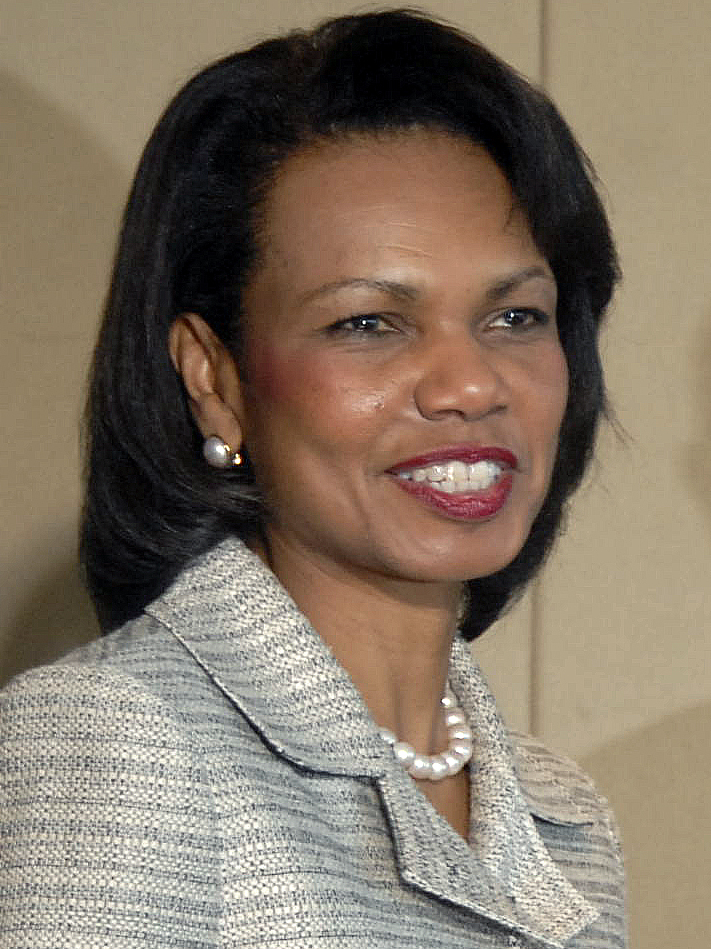
Condoleezza Rice, Secretary of State from Alabama

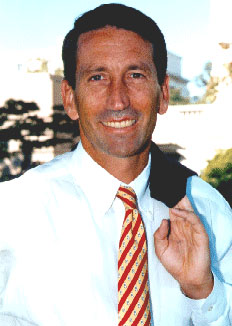
Mark Sanford, Governor of South Carolina

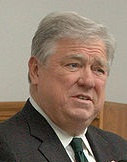
Haley Barbour, Governor of Mississippi

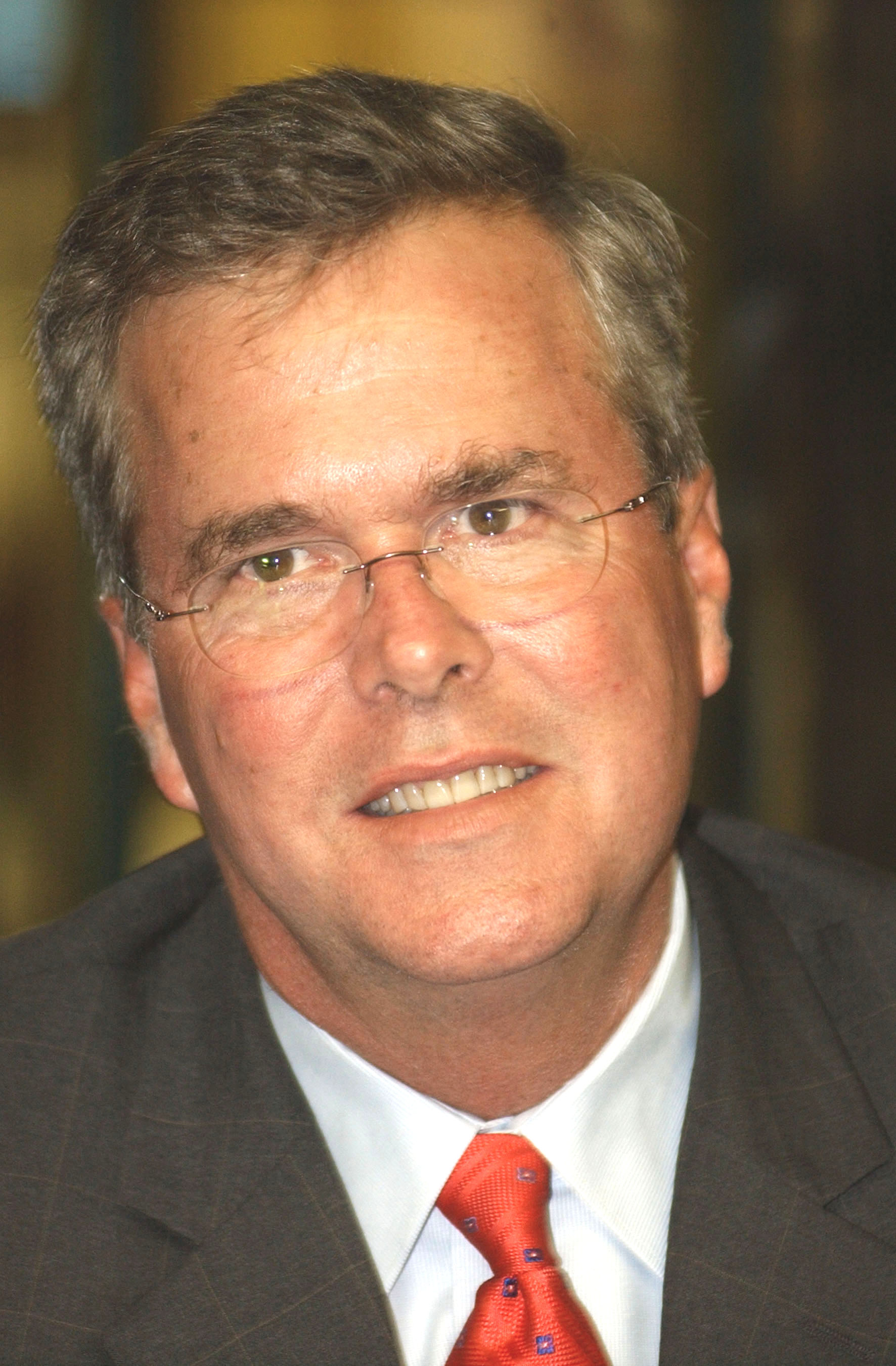
Jeb Bush, Governor of Florida

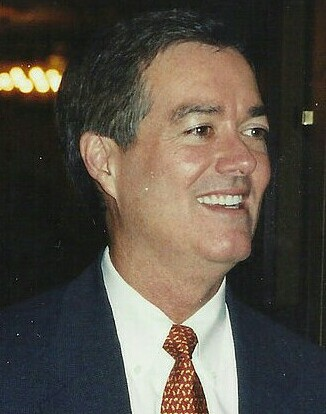
Bill Owens, Governor of Colorado

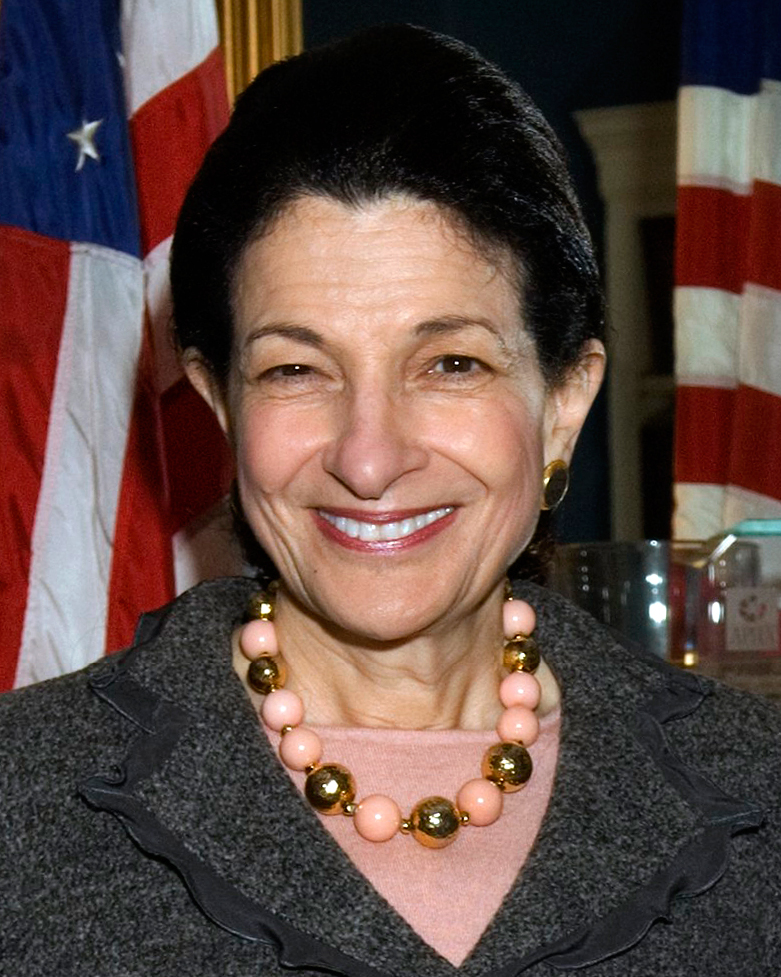
Olympia Snowe, Senator from Maine

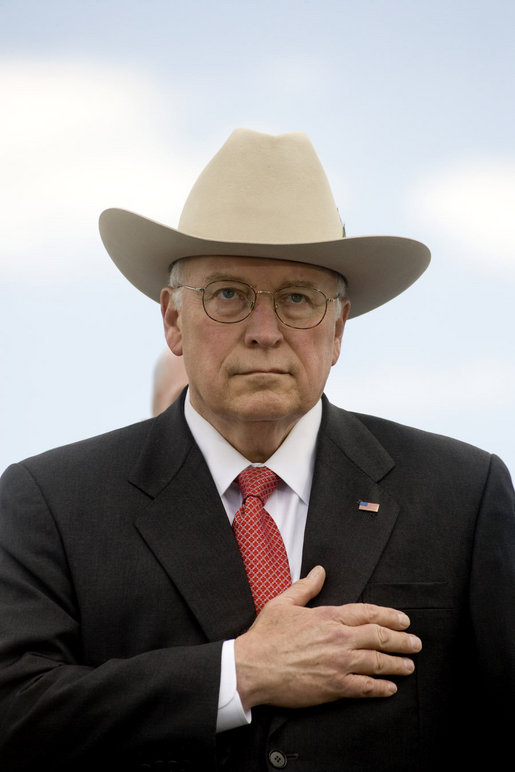
Dick Cheney, Vice President from Wyoming

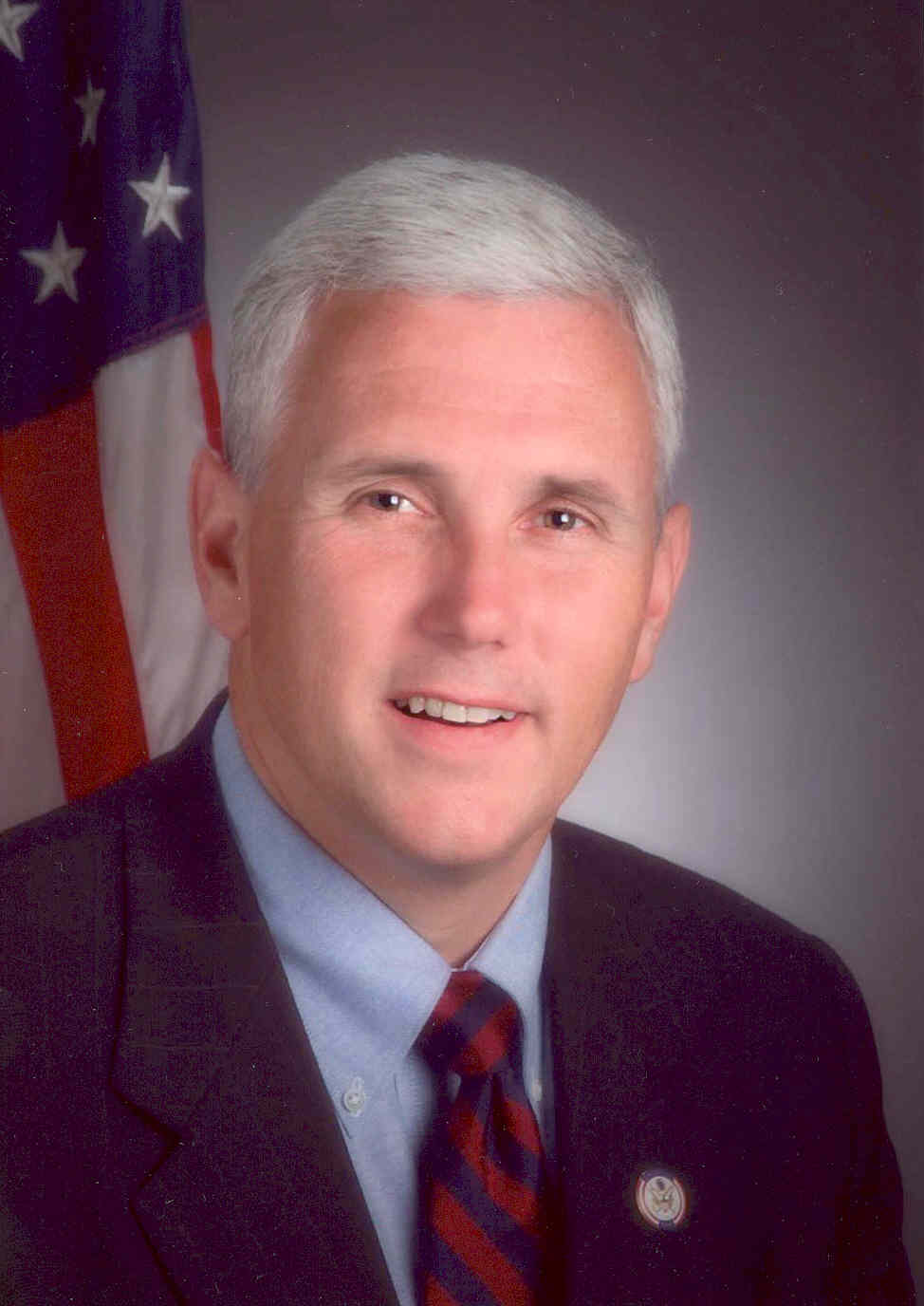
Mike Pence, Congressman from Indiana (ran successfully for re-election)

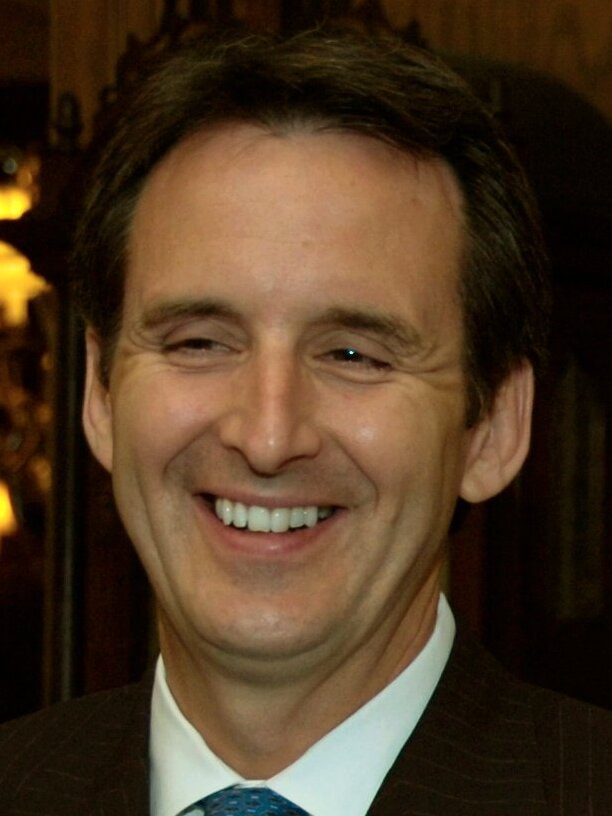
Tim Pawlenty, Governor of Minnesota

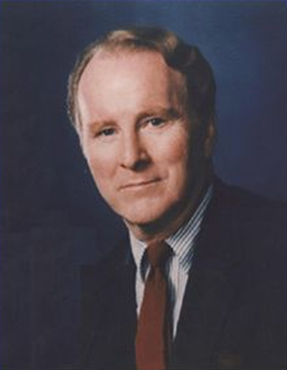
Bob Dornan, former Congressman from California

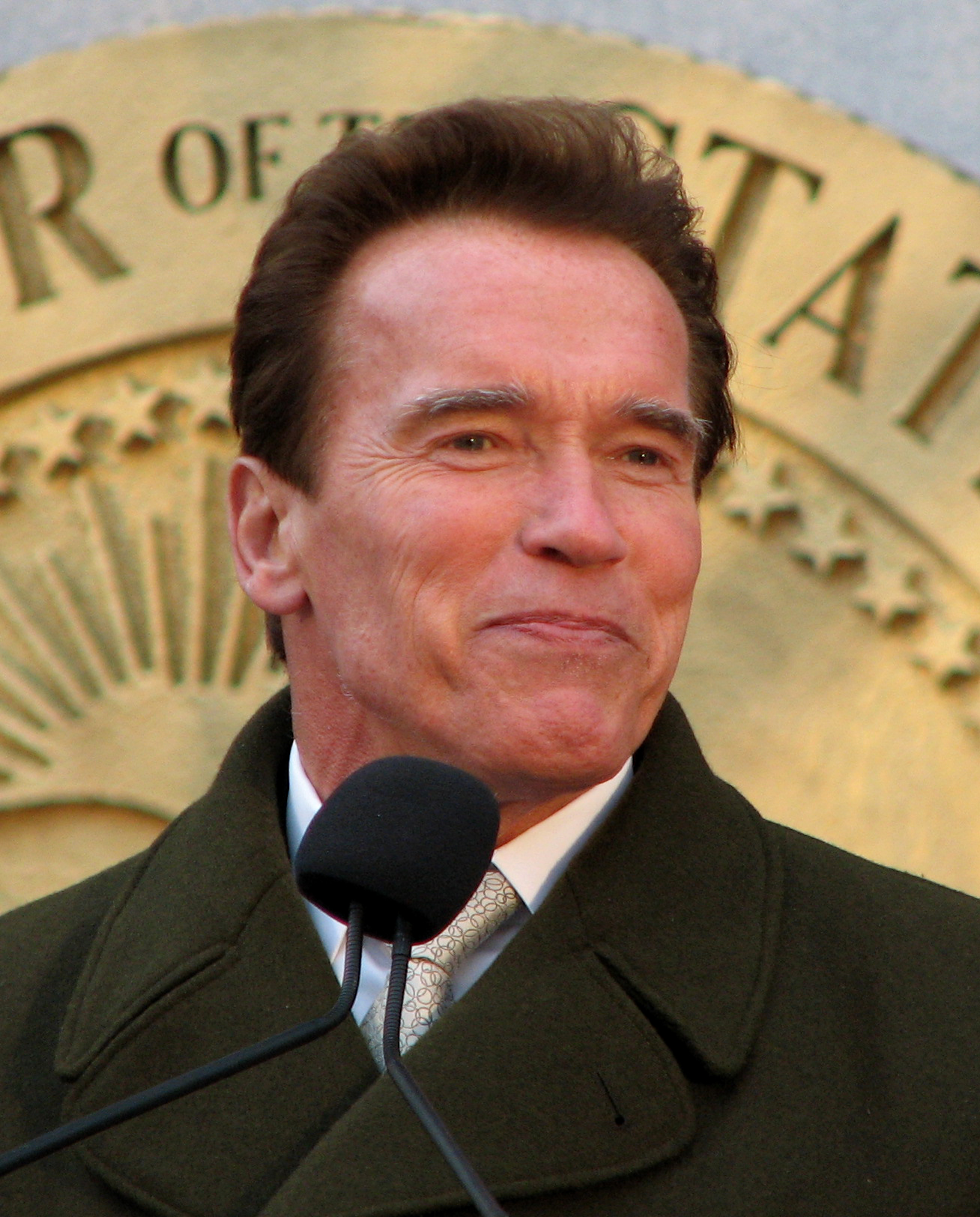
Arnold Schwarzenegger, Governor of California(ineligible to run)

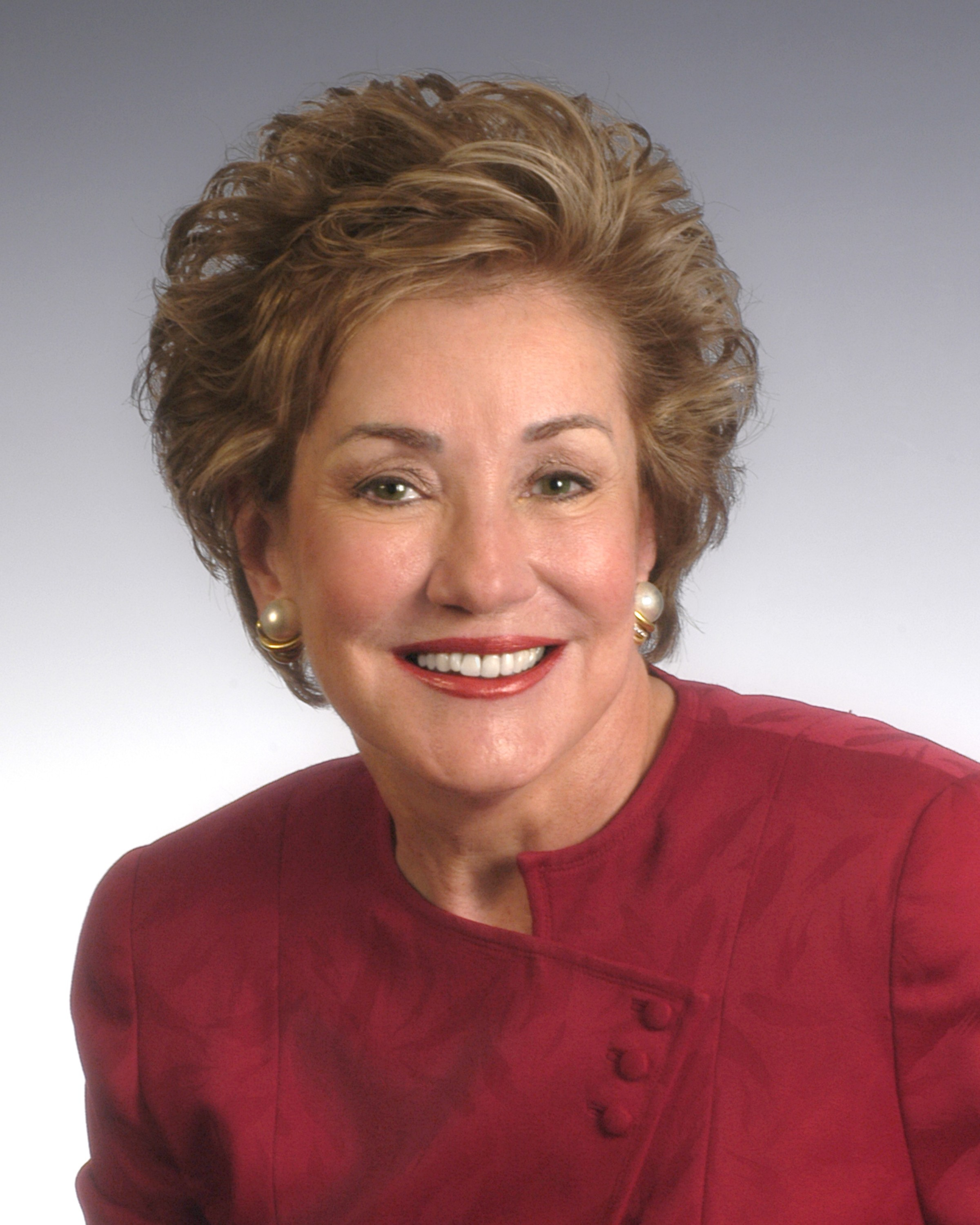
Elizabeth Dole, Senator from North Carolina (ran for re-election)

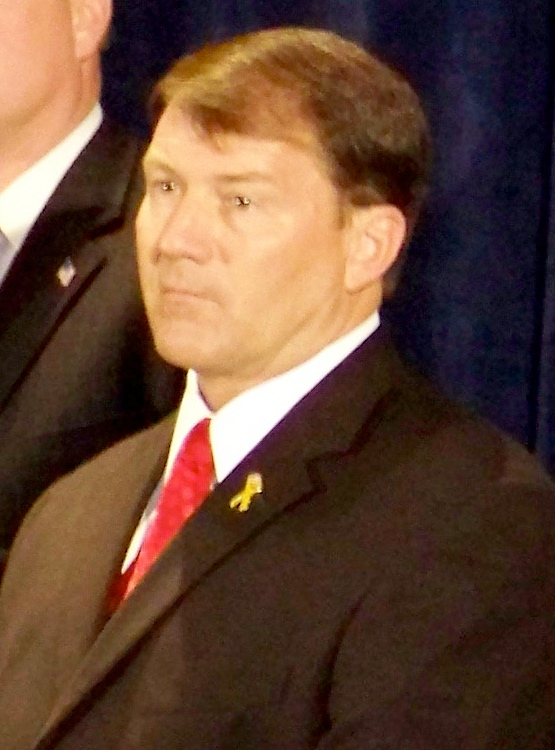
Mike Rounds, Governor of South Dakota

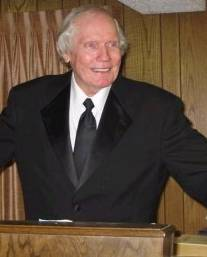
Fred Phelps, pastor of the Westboro Baptist Church from Kansas

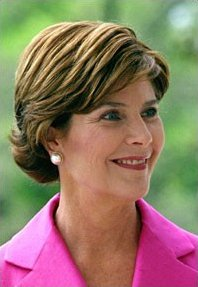
Laura Bush, First Lady of the United States from Texas

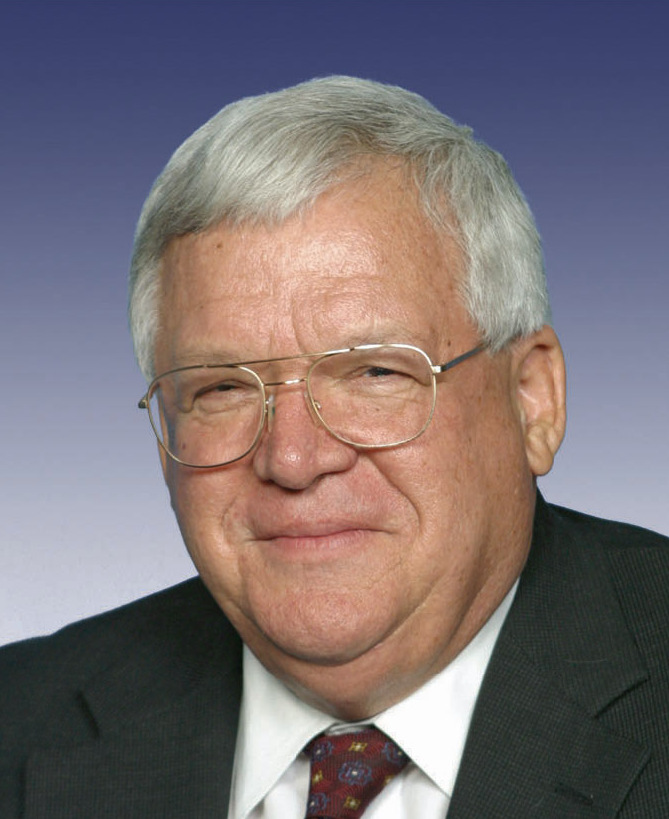
Dennis Hastert, Speaker of the House from Illinois

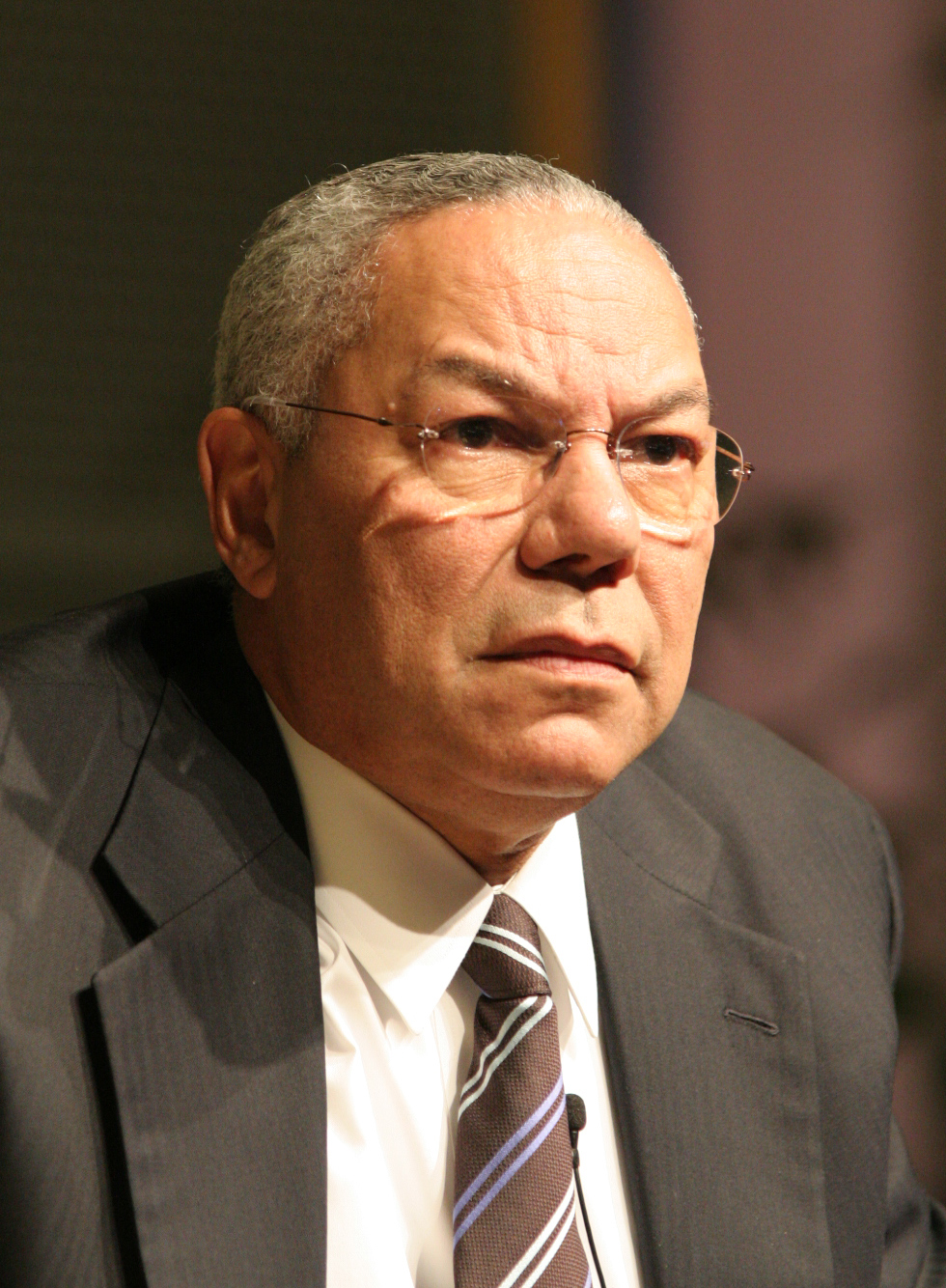
Colin Powell, Former Secretary of State from Virginia

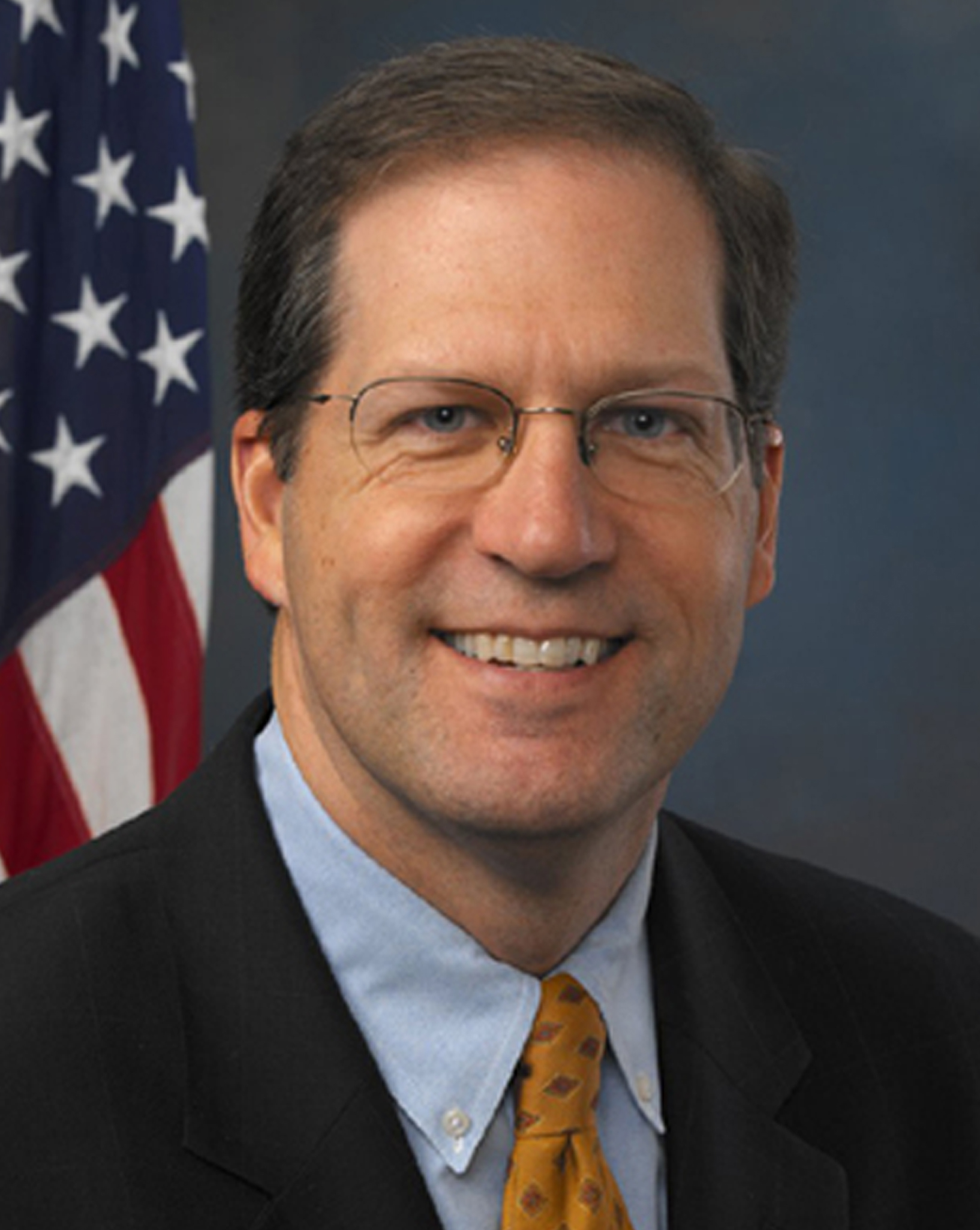
John E. Sununu, Senator from New Hampshire (ran for re-election)

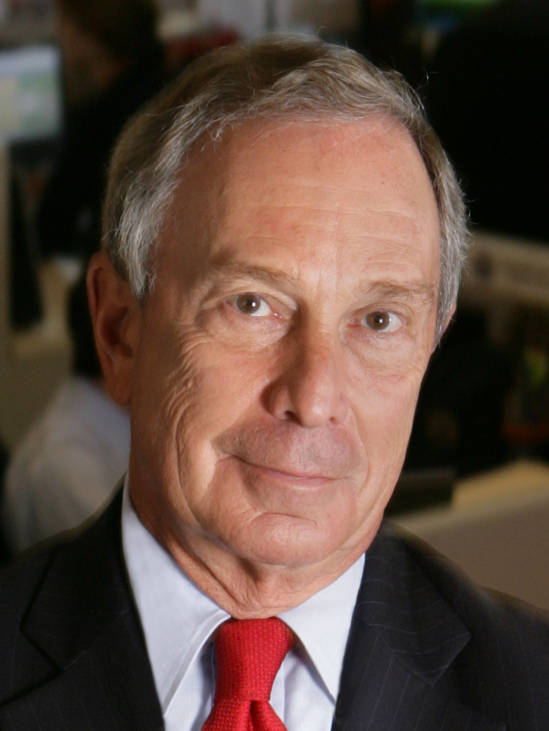
Mayor of New York City
Michael Bloomberg (Note: Not a registered Republican.)
from New York

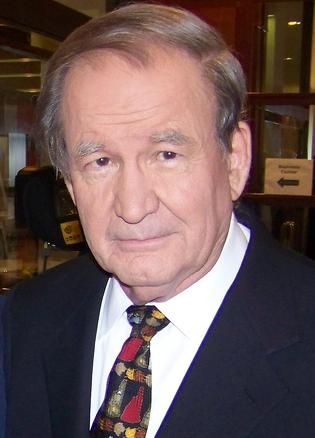
Pat Buchanan, political commentator from Virginia

== Calendar ==
Primary key
Primary type	Explanation
Closed	Voters may only select candidates of the party for which they are registered
Open	Anyone is allowed to vote for candidates from either party
Modified open	Voters registered to a party may only select candidates of that party, but independents may choose candidates from either party
Caucus	Party members meet among themselves to select candidates. Rules may be very complicated, including members having to choose publicly by standing in groups by preference, instead of secret ballot
Primary	An election-type selection process, with general voters going to polling places for a secret ballot
Convention	Delegates chosen locally by each party meet in a central location and select a candidate
Presidential preference	Those polled get to list candidates in the order of whom they like most. As candidates are eliminated, the highest remaining on their list becomes their vote
WTA	Winner-Take-All – whoever wins the most votes in the state, even if not a majority, gets all of the delegates
Proportional	The state's delegates are divided up among the candidates, in proportion to their percentage of the vote

Republican candidates in the 2008 U.S. presidential election campaigned for the nomination of their party in a series of primary elections and caucus events.

Unlike the Democratic Party, which mandates a proportional representation for delegate selection, the Republican Party has no such limitation. For states with primaries, some states choose to use the "winner-take-all" method to allocate delegates within a state, while others do winner-take-all within a specific congressional district, and still others use the proportional process. Unlike the Democratic Party, state party by-laws determine whether each delegate is pledged and for how long the delegate is pledged.

In caucus states, most state parties use a two pronged process. A straw poll, often called a presidential preference poll, is conducted of the attendees at the caucus. The results are released to the media and published on the state party website. Delegates are then elected to the county conventions. It is at the county conventions that delegates are elected to state conventions, and from the state convention to the national convention. At each level, delegates may be bound or unbound to a candidate. If unbound, delegates are not obligated to follow the results of the presidential preference poll. Thus, all estimates of delegates from caucus states are dependent on state party by-laws.

== Campaign ==
=== 2007 ===
With Vice President Dick Cheney choosing not to seek the nomination, making this election the first time since 1952 that neither the current President nor Vice President was a candidate, and Secretary of State Condoleezza Rice ruling herself out, the race for the 2008 presidential nomination was wide open. It officially began in March 2006 when John H. Cox became the first candidate to enter the 2008 race. The Democratic takeover of both houses of Congress and President Bush's unpopularity were strong issues for the GOP field. At the beginning of 2007, the announced Republican field was former Governor of Wisconsin and Cabinet member Tommy Thompson, former Governor of Virginia Jim Gilmore, and Senator of Kansas Sam Brownback. Former senator of Virginia George Allen was considered a top contender until his loss in the midterm elections. He announced on December 10, 2006, that he would not seek the 2008 nomination. In early January former Governor of Massachusetts Mitt Romney announced he was forming an exploratory committee. Afterwards several others announced they were running, including U.S. Congressman Ron Paul, Mike Huckabee of Arkansas, Rudy Giuliani of New York City, U.S. Senator John McCain, U.S. Congressman Duncan Hunter, and U.S. Congressman Tom Tancredo. A poll released in early February had Giuliani leading with 32% and John McCain second with 18%. By early March, Giuliani had become the frontrunner. Alan Keyes and former Senator and actor Fred Thompson entered the race later in September.

The first to drop out of the race was former Virginia Governor Jim Gilmore in July. After that Tommy Thompson also dropped out in August after finishing sixth in the Ames Iowa straw poll. Then pro-life advocate Sam Brownback dropped out of the race in October. In December, staunch illegal-immigration opponent Tom Tancredo and businessman John H. Cox also left the race.

=== Iowa and New Hampshire ===
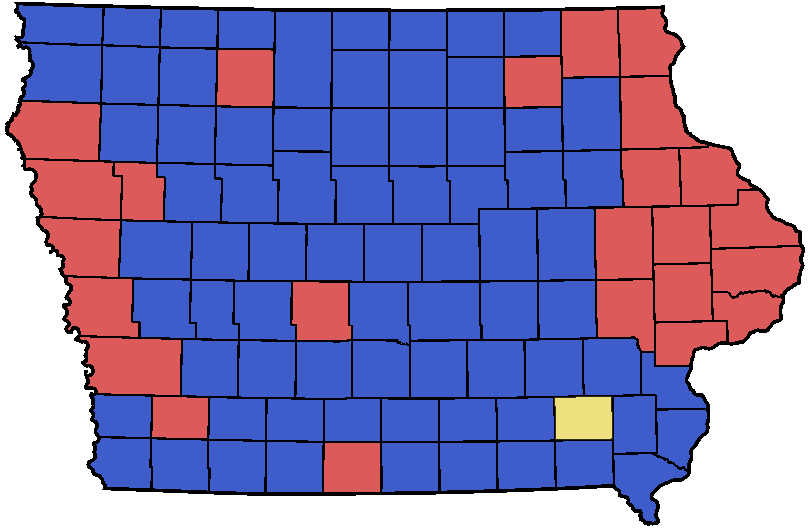
2008 Iowa Republican Caucus county map Mike Huckabee Mitt Romney Ron Paul

On January 3, 2008, the Iowa caucuses began. The final averaged polling results from Real Clear Politics showed Mike Huckabee at 30%, Romney at 27%, McCain and Thompson tied at 12%, Paul at 7%, and Giuliani at 6%. Among those surveyed in Exit Polling data, 45% cited themselves as very conservative and voted for Huckabee 35% to Romney's 23% and Thompson's 22%. Among those who called themselves "somewhat conservative" (43%), Huckabee won 34% to Romney's 27% and McCain's 18%.

Final Results showed Huckabee swept much of the state with the exception of the western and eastern portions of the state which included Davenport, Cedar Rapids, as well as Sioux City. Romney swept the eastern and western portions of the state and Paul took one southern county. The final results in Iowa were Huckabee with 34%, Romney with 25%, Thompson and McCain each with 13%, Paul with 10% and Giuliani with 4%.

2008 New Hampshire Primary results by municipality. John McCain Mitt Romney Mike Huckabee Rudy Giuliani Ron Paul Tie No votes

In the New Hampshire Primary, both McCain and Romney had gambled much on the state. McCain had staked much on his grassroots efforts in the state he won in 2000, as well as the state with one of the most independent voting blocks which was McCain's strong suit. Romney, coming from neighboring Massachusetts was known by many in New Hampshire and even owned a home in the state of New Hampshire. Pre-Primary polling showed McCain with a slight edge (32–28%) with Huckabee leading Giuliani for third (12–9%).

On Primary night, McCain won 37–32% and Huckabee beat Giuliani for third 11–9%. After the results, Huckabee decided to focus on the South Carolina primary, while both McCain and Romney went to Michigan where polls showed a competitive race between the two.

=== Michigan ===
With different winners in Iowa and New Hampshire – and Mitt Romney taking the lower-profile Wyoming caucus – the January 15 Michigan primary loomed as an important battle. Polls after New Hampshire showed a tight race between McCain and Romney, with Huckabee a close third. Many saw Michigan as Romney's last chance for a campaign-saving win after disappointments in the first two races. Others said that a win in Michigan could cement McCain's status as the "front-runner" for the nomination. McCain's campaign garnered about $1 million in newly contributed funds immediately after the New Hampshire win, but still had $3.5 million in bank debt.

Nevertheless, some polls showed McCain getting a significant national bounce from his New Hampshire win; the January 11 CNN nationwide poll had him at 34 percent support, a 21-point increase from where he had been just a month before, and a significant lead over Huckabee (21 percent) and Giuliani (18 percent). As the Michigan race entered its final days, McCain gained some notoriety by sending out mailers there and in South Carolina attacking Romney's tax record and touting his own. A Romney campaign spokesman called the ad "as sloppy as it is factually incorrect", and FactCheck.org called the piece "misleading." McCain responded by saying, "It's not negative campaigning. I think it's what his record is." "It's a tough business," he added.

The dominant issue in Michigan was the state of the economy. Michigan had by far the nation's largest unemployment rate, at 7.4 percent, and was continuing to lose jobs from its historical manufacturing base. McCain offered a bit of his "straight talk", saying that "There are some jobs that aren't coming back to Michigan," and proposing federal job training plans and other remedies to compensate. Romney seized on McCain's statement as overly pessimistic and promoted instead his family heritage – "[I've] got the automobile industry in my blood veins" – as well as his being a Washington outsider who would go there and "turn Washington inside out."

In the end, McCain finished second in the primary behind Romney, gaining 30 percent of the vote to Romney's 39 percent.

=== Nevada and South Carolina ===
Mitt Romney was heavily favored to win Nevada, leading 34% to 19% in polls. He exceeded expectations, earning 51% of the vote with Ron Paul beating out John McCain for second. Romney campaigned hard in Nevada and did not campaign in South Carolina, while the other leading Republican candidates, John McCain and Mike Huckabee, kept their focus on South Carolina. Nevada was not subject to the Republican party cutting in half the number of delegates the state can send to the national convention, and neither was South Carolina. However, Nevada had more delegates at stake than South Carolina. A win in Nevada extended Romney's lead in total delegates. Nevada's large Mormon population helped Romney win the state.

After coming last in this caucus, Duncan Hunter withdrew his bid for the nomination.

Mike Huckabee needed to win South Carolina for his campaign to remain viable. RealClearPolitics reported that the average support from polls placed McCain in the lead with 27%, followed by Huckabee with 25%, Romney with 15%, Thompson with 15%, Paul with 4%, and Giuliani with 3%. Thompson started attacking Mike Huckabee heavily, questioning his conservative credentials. But in the end McCain narrowly won by 14,743 or 3%, putting McCain as the frontrunner in Florida.

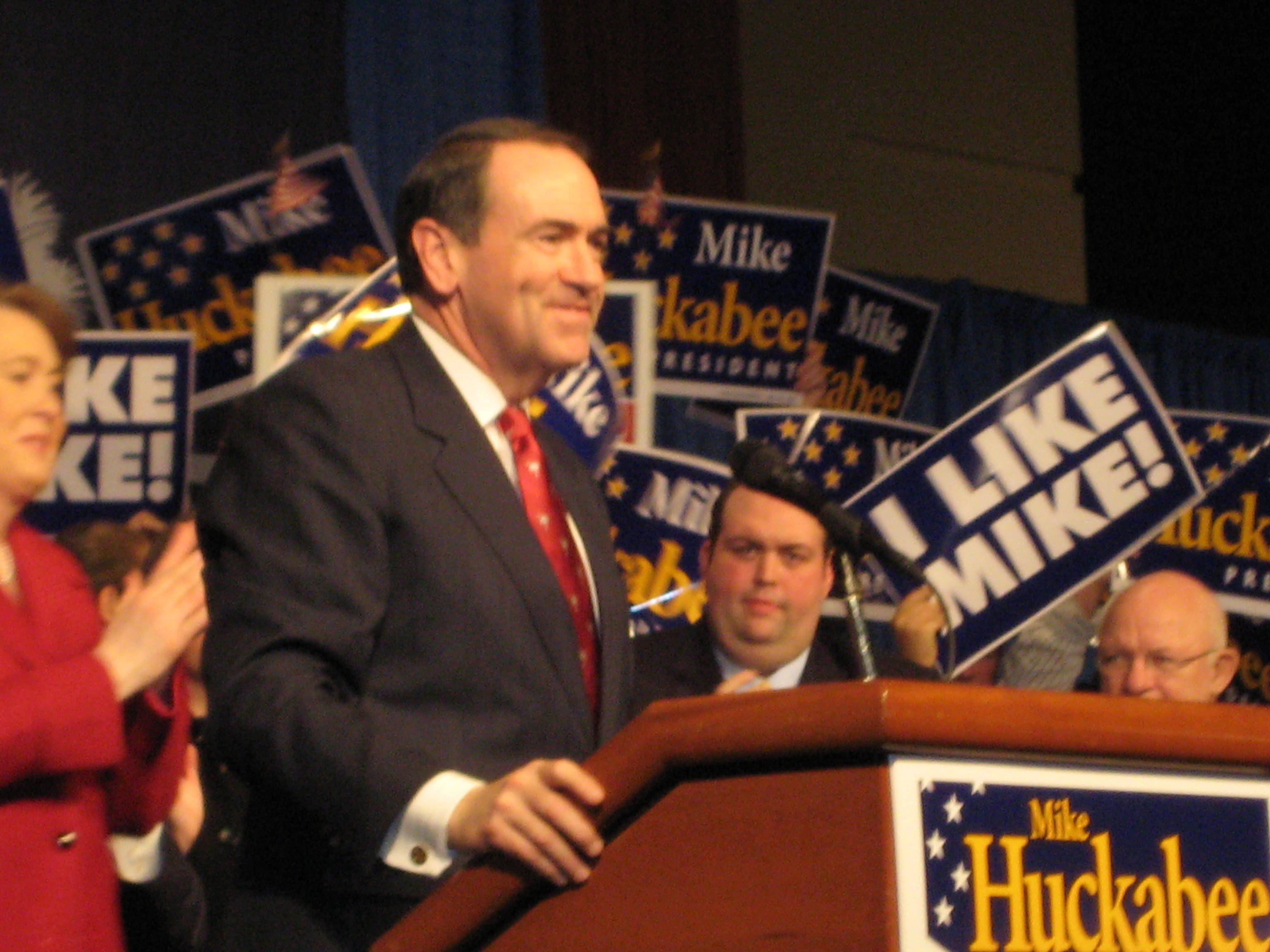
Mike Huckabee giving his concession speech after the 2008 South Carolina Presidential Primary in Columbia, SC.

Fred Thompson only placed third, even though he had started to campaign in South Carolina immediately after Iowa and before the other candidates had started campaigning there. He withdrew the next day.

=== Florida ===
Rudy Giuliani campaigned heavily in Florida, which he expected to use as his "launch pad" for a "strong showing" on Super Tuesday. He campaigned almost entirely in Florida, and largely ignored South Carolina and other states voting before February 5. Polls taken before the primary showed that John McCain was the slight front runner over Mitt Romney. Giuliani had been campaigning with virtually no opposition; however, following the South Carolina Republican primary, 2008, several candidates flew down to Florida to begin campaigning up to January 29 when the primary occurred. RealClearPolitics reported that the average support from polls taken in the days immediately prior to primary day placed McCain slightly in the lead with 31%, followed by Romney with 30%, Giuliani with 15%, Huckabee with 13%, and Paul with 4%. Former Senator Fred Thompson and Rep. Duncan Hunter, though already out of the race, still remained on the ballot in the Florida primary.

McCain was able to ride a last-minute endorsement by then-Republican Governor Charlie Crist to a five-point victory on January 29. He took all 57 delegates in Florida's winner-take-all contest. (The state's delegate total had been reduced by half due to RNC rules about primaries held before February 5.) Giuliani, having banked heavily on Florida, ended his campaign the following day.

=== Super Tuesday ===
Super Tuesday

Arizona Senator John McCain

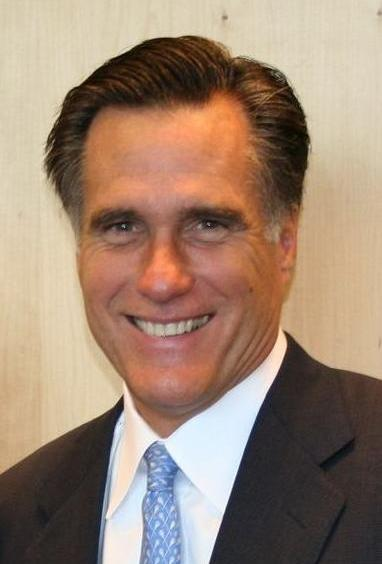
Former Massachusetts Governor
Mitt Romney

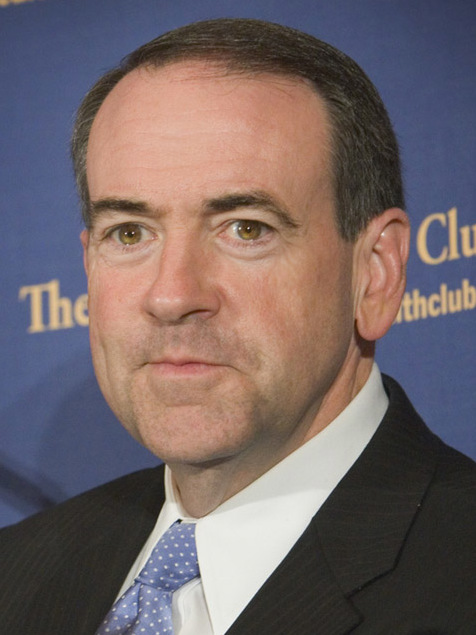
Former Arkansas Governor
Mike Huckabee

February 5, 2008, called Super Tuesday, 2008, saw 21 contests held from Massachusetts to California.

Nominating Contests Held – 21

- Won by John McCain – 9
- Won by Mitt Romney – 7
- Won by Mike Huckabee – 5

Pledged Delegates at Stake – 901

- Won by John McCain – 568
- Won by Mitt Romney – 176
- Won by Mike Huckabee – 147

Delegate Standing on February 7

- McCain – 680
- Romney (out) – 270
- Huckabee – 176
Information from CNN

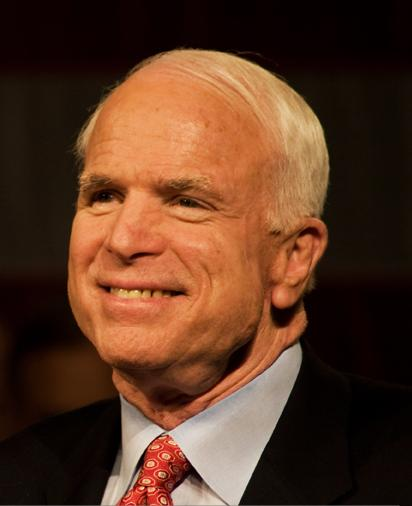
McCain reacts to his Super Tuesday victories during a celebration that night at the Arizona Biltmore Hotel in Phoenix.

On January 31 McCain received the endorsement of California Governor Arnold Schwarzenegger and began campaigning with him. This was a key endorsement, as California was one of the Super Tuesday states and had more delegates than any other state. The same day, Governor Rick Perry of Texas threw his support behind McCain. Perry had previously been a Giuliani supporter, while Schwarzenegger had refrained from endorsing either McCain or Giuliani because he counted both men as friends. Meanwhile, Romney, still burning about McCain's Iraq withdrawal timetable charge, compared McCain to disgraced former President Richard Nixon, saying that McCain's claim was "reminiscent of the Nixon era" and that "I don't think I want to see our party go back to that kind of campaigning."

McCain won his home state of Arizona, taking all 53 of the state's delegates and the largest of the Super Tuesday prizes, winning nearly all of California's 173 delegates. McCain also scored wins in Connecticut, Delaware, Illinois, Missouri, New Jersey, New York and Oklahoma. Huckabee also made surprise wins in states he had polled behind in previously like Georgia, Alabama, and Tennessee. Huckabee also won the first contest of Super Tuesday in West Virginia. Romney won his home state of Massachusetts. He also won Utah, Colorado, and Minnesota.

The next day, McCain appeared confident that he would be the Republican nominee. Estimates showed him with 707 delegates – nearly 60% of the total needed to win the nomination. He began to appeal to disaffected conservatives, saying: "We share the common principles and values and ideas for the future of this country based on a fundamental conservative political philosophy, which has been my record." He also suggested that the right wing of the party "calm down a little bit" and begin to look for areas of agreement. Meanwhile, Romney advisers privately expressed doubts about whether their candidate could realistically hope to defeat McCain, and it was unclear if Romney would spend significant money on key February 12 contests in Virginia and Maryland.

=== Later February contests ===
Both McCain and Romney addressed the Conservative Political Action Conference (CPAC) in Washington, DC on February 7, while Mike Huckabee spoke on February 9. Romney used his speech to announce the end of his campaign, saying, "Now if I fight on in my campaign, all the way to the convention – (cheers, applause). I want you to know I've given this a lot of thought. I'd forestall the launch of a national campaign and, frankly, I'd be making it easier for Senator Clinton or Obama to win. Frankly, in this time of war, I simply cannot let my campaign be a part of aiding a surrender to terror." McCain spoke about an hour later, again appealing to right-wing uncertainty about his ideology.

He focused on his opposition to abortion and gun control, as well as his support for lower taxes and free-market health care solutions. He told the CPAC audience that he arrived in Washington as "a foot soldier in the Reagan Revolution", and addressed the issue of illegal immigration – one of the major issues where conservatives have attacked McCain. He said that "it would be among my highest priorities to secure our borders first", before addressing other immigration laws. Mike Huckabee spoke to CPAC two days later and said, "I know that there was some speculation that I might come here today to announce that I would be getting out of the race. But I want to make sure you understand. Am I quitting? Well, let's get that settled right now. No, I'm not. And the reason is simple – I never learned arithmetic. You see folks, while I didn't get a college degree in mathematics and writing, I majored in miracles. Mathematically impossible miracles. It is because I go back to that which helped crystallize in me a conservative viewpoint as a teenager when it wasn't easy or popular to be a Republican or a conservative in my hometown, because I do believe that America is about making choices, not simply echoing that of others. Let others join the "Me, too" crowd. But I didn't get where I am today and I didn't fight the battles in a state that, when I became its governor, was 90 percent Democrat, by simply echoing the voices of others. I did it by staking out a choice, stating that choice, making that choice and fighting for that choice, to believe that some things were right, some things were wrong, and it's better to be right and even to not win than it is to be wrong and to be a part of the crowd."

February 9 saw voting in Louisiana, Kansas and Washington state. Huckabee won an easy victory in Kansas, claiming all 36 of the state's delegates to the national convention. Only 14,016 votes were cast, and the McCain campaign expressed no concern over the lightly attended caucus. However, social conservatives had a strong presence in the Kansas Republican party, and the results served to highlight conservative dissatisfaction with the Senator. Louisiana was much closer, but Huckabee won there as well, beating McCain by less than one percentage point. McCain was declared the winner of the Washington caucuses, where 18 delegates were at stake. The February 19 primary would determine the other 19 delegates from the state. When McCain was declared the winner of the caucuses, with a lead of only 242 (3,468 to 3,226) over Huckabee and counting stopped with only 87% of the precincts reporting, Huckabee's campaign indicated that they would challenge the results.

Next up was the Potomac primary on February 12, with voting in Virginia, Maryland and the District of Columbia. McCain swept the three races and took all 113 delegates which were at stake.

The next day, the McCain camp released a memo calling a Huckabee win "mathematically impossible." In truth, however, it was not impossible. In fact, if Huckabee failed to reach 1191 delegates but succeeded in keeping McCain from reaching 1191, then the result would have been a brokered convention.

With the media declaring McCain the "presumptive nominee", McCain began to focus on the Democrats, particularly leading candidate Barack Obama, in anticipation of the general election.

The day after McCain's Potomac sweep, the Kansas City Star published a list of people who have been mentioned as possible McCain running mates, if he secured the nomination.

On February 14, Mitt Romney officially endorsed McCain and asked his approximately 280 delegates to support him at the national convention. If all or most of Romney's delegates backed McCain, it would give him nearly enough to win the nomination, with several large states still yet to vote. Despite these developments, Huckabee vowed to stay in the race. "I may get beat, but I'm not going to quit," he said. A few days later, McCain was endorsed by former President George H. W. Bush, in a move intended to shore up his support among base party elements.

On February 19, McCain continued his winning ways, picking up wins over Huckabee in the Wisconsin primary and the Washington state primary. McCain and Barack Obama engaged in a pointed exchange over Al-Qaeda in Iraq on February 27.

=== March contests ===
Super Tuesday 2

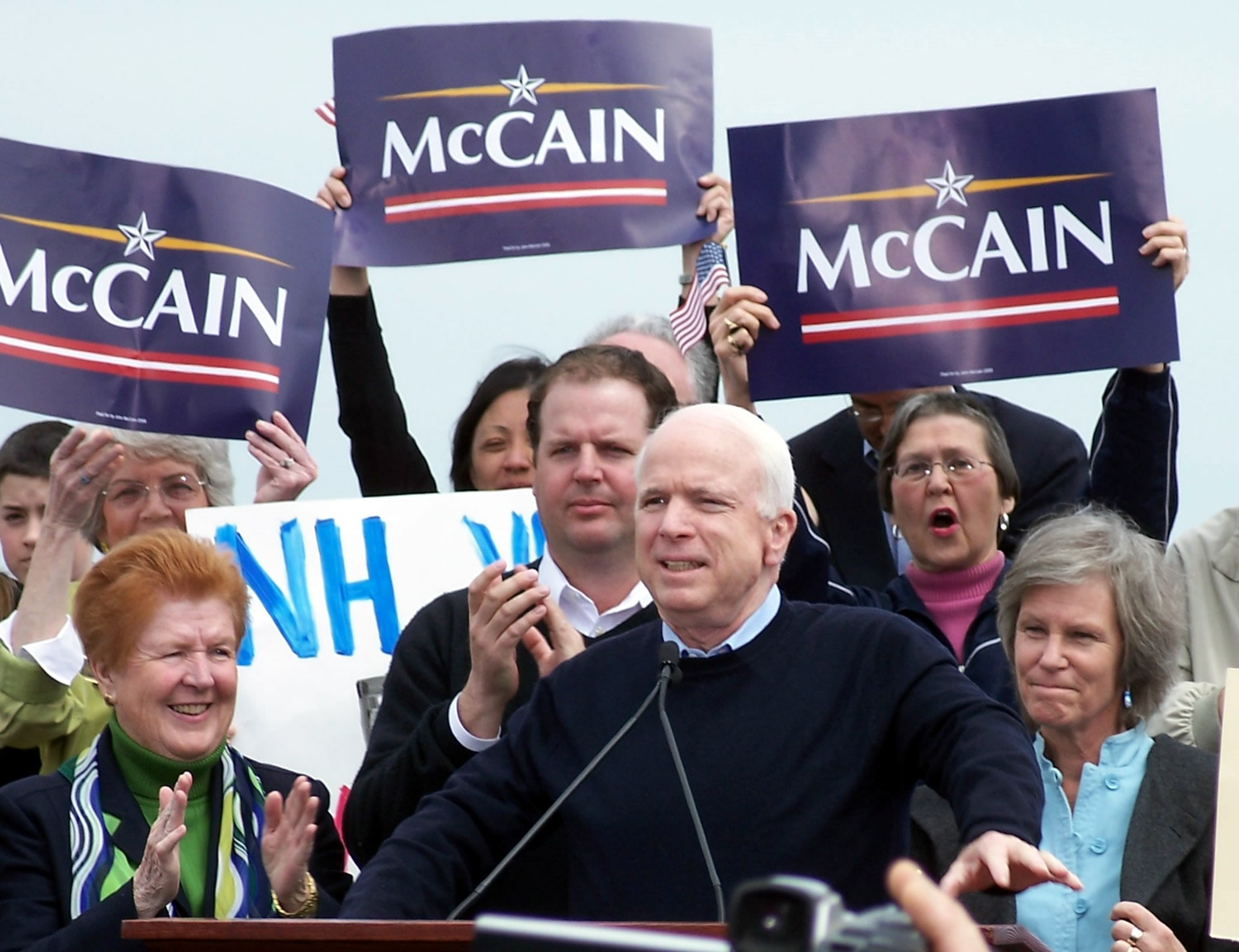
Arizona Senator
John McCain

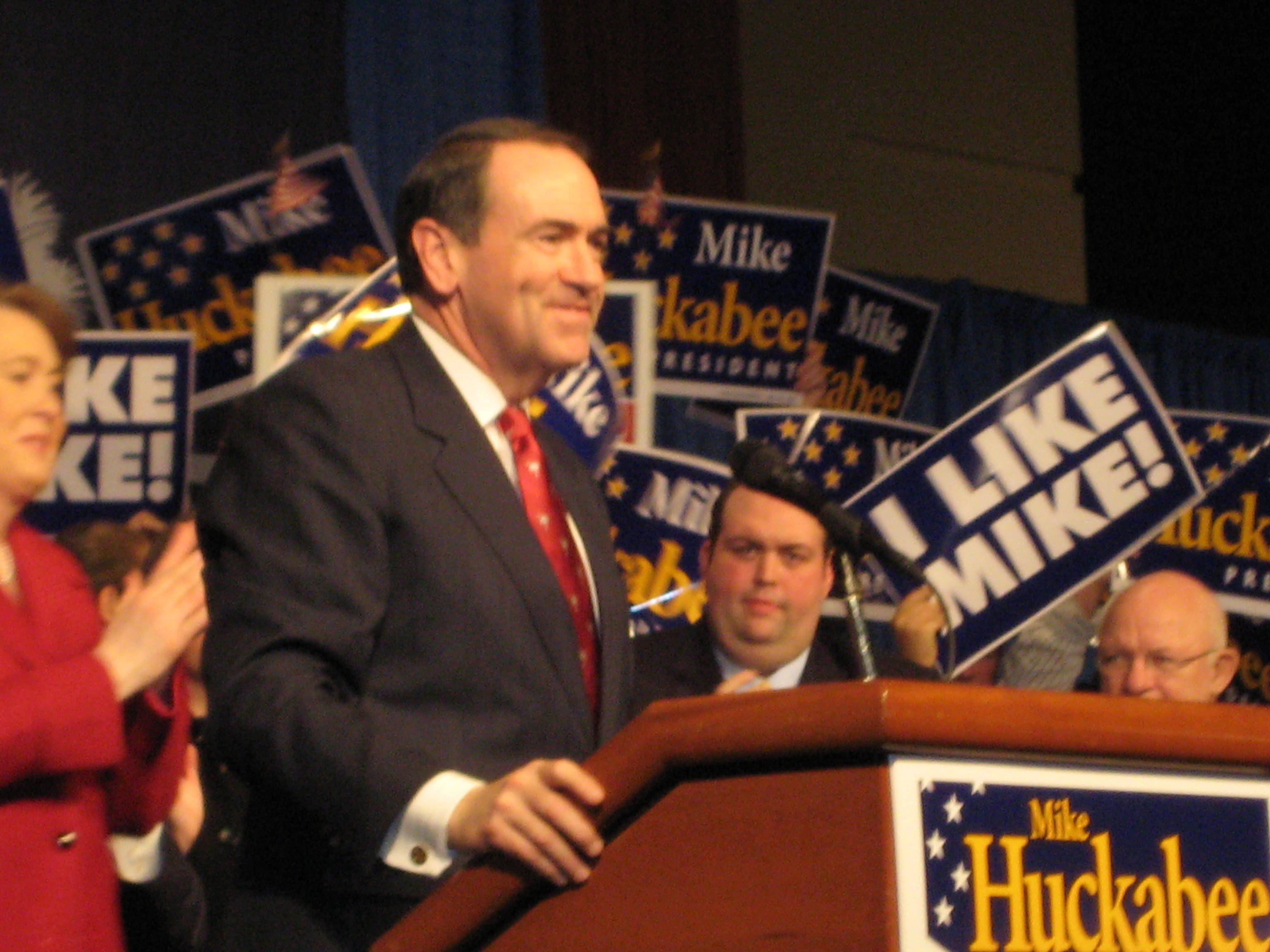
Former Arkansas Governor Mike Huckabee

Contests held on March 4, 2008 in Texas, Ohio, Vermont and Rhode Island effectively ended the 2008 Republican Primaries by forcing Mike Huckabee to withdraw after poor showings and giving John McCain enough delegates to win the Republican nomination.

Nominating Contests Held – 4

- Won by McCain – 4
- Won by Huckabee – 0

Pledged Delegates at Stake – 261

- Won by McCain – 241
- Won by Huckabee – 20

Delegate Standing on March 5

- McCain – 1289
- Huckabee (out) – 267
Information from CNN

CNN had cancelled a debate originally scheduled for February 28, saying that McCain was the "presumptive nominee." Mike Huckabee challenged John McCain to a debate before the March 4 primaries, and the Values Voter coalition stepped in, arranging for a debate hall and inviting both McCain and Huckabee, as well as Rep. Ron Paul to participate in a March 3 debate event. After Governor Huckabee had accepted the invitation, Senator McCain said that he had a prior commitment and begged off. Huckabee had previous success with rural and Evangelical Christian voters. Huckabee was endorsed by Dr. James Dobson. McCain received an endorsement from Pastor John Hagee (which he later renounced on May 22). On March 4, Super Tuesday 2, McCain managed to win a large number of Evangelical voters along with his usual independent and veteran supporters. John McCain officially clinched the Republican presidential nomination on March 4, 2008, sweeping the primaries in Ohio, Texas, Rhode Island, and Vermont. That night, Mike Huckabee withdrew from the race and endorsed McCain. President George W. Bush invited Senator McCain to the White House for Bush's endorsement.

2008 Republican presidential primaries delegate count As of June 10, 2008
Candidates	Actual pledged delegates^{1} (1,780 of 1,917)	Estimated total delegates^{2} (2,159 of 2,380; 1,191 needed to win)
John McCain	1,378	1,575
Mike Huckabee	240	278
Mitt Romney	148	271
Ron Paul	14	35
Color key: / 1st place / Candidate has withdrawn
Sources:^{1} "Primary Season Election Results". The New York Times. September 16, 2008. Archived from the original on September 16, 2008.^{2} "Election Center 2008 – Republican Delegate Scorecard". CNN. June 4, 2008.

== Endorsements ==
Unlike in the Democratic Party, Republican members of Congress (including Senate members, House members, and non-voting delegates), and state governors are not automatically made delegates to the party's national convention, however their endorsements can hold sway on voters in caucuses and primaries.

Each state's two members of the Republican National Committee, and the party chairs of each U.S. state and the District of Columbia, Puerto Rico, American Samoa, Guam, the U.S. Virgin Islands, and Northern Mariana Islands are the only automatic delegates to the party's national convention. These superdelegates while officially uncommitted, may also publicly endorse a candidate.

== Statewide results ==
=== Early primaries and caucuses ===
Date	State	Type	District level delegates	At-large delegates	State party delegates	Bonus delegates	Total size of delegation	Delegate selection process
January 3, 2008	Iowa	caucus	15	10	3	12	40	County/state convention
January 5, 2008	Wyoming	convention	3	10	3	12	12/28 [12/14] ^{Note}	County/state convention
January 8, 2008	New Hampshire	primary	6	10	3	5	24 [12] ^{Note}	Statewide proportional
January 15, 2008	Michigan	primary	45	10	3	2	60 [30] ^{Note}	District-level winner-take-all (WTA) + at-large/bonus proportional
January 19, 2008	Nevada	caucus	9	10	3	12	34	County/state convention
January 19, 2008	South Carolina	primary, open	18	10	3	16	47 [24] ^{Note}	District-level WTA + at-large/bonus WTA
January 22, 2008	Louisiana	caucus, closed non-binding, just selection of district delegates	21	0	0	0	21/57	District by state convention + at-large/bonus by state convention unless 50%+ threshold met. Non-binding caucus to avoid stripping.
January 25-February 5, 2008	Hawaii	caucus, closed	6	10	3	1	20	state convention
January 29, 2008	Florida	primary, closed	75	10	3	26	114 [57] ^{Note}	Statewide WTA
February 1-February 3, 2008	Maine	caucus, closed	6	10	3	2	21	District/state convention

GOP February 5 rule Under Republican National Committee rules, no state was allowed to hold its 2008 primary before February 5. Five states – Wyoming, New Hampshire, Michigan, South Carolina, and Florida – moved their primaries ahead and were subsequently stripped of one-half of their apportioned delegates by the RNC. This punishment was eventually the same as Democratic procedures though that party originally decided to strip all delegates from offending states Michigan and Florida before seating half. The Republican rules did not affect Iowa, Maine, Nevada and Louisiana, because those states did not technically choose their delegates until district or state conventions that occurred after February 5. The Iowa county and state conventions were held on March 15 and June 14, 2008, respectively. The Nevada state convention was held on April 26, 2008, but was suspended by party officials before delegates were elected. The executive board of the Nevada Republican Party met on July 25, 2008, and appointed all 34 delegates and 31 alternates. The Louisiana caucuses selected 105 state delegates to the state convention on February 16 in Baton Rouge.

=== Super Tuesday ===
Many states moved the dates of their primaries or caucuses up to February 5 (Super Tuesday). With almost half the nation voting on that date it acted as a quasi-"national primary". This has also been dubbed "Super Duper Tuesday," and "Tsunami Tuesday".

State	Type	District-level delegates	At-large delegates	State party delegates	Bonus delegates	Total size of delegation	Delegate selection process
Alabama	primary, open	21	10	3	14	48	modified WTA district + proportional at-large/bonus
Alaska	caucus, closed	3	10	3	13	29	District/state convention
Arizona	presidential preference election	24	10	3	16	53	Statewide WTA
Arkansas	primary, open	12	10	3	9	34	modified WTA district + proportional at-large/bonus (WTA if 50%+)
California	primary, closed	159	10	3	1	173	WTA district + WTA at-large/bonus
Colorado	caucus, closed	21	10	3	12	46	district/state convention
Connecticut	primary, closed	15	10	3	2	30	Statewide WTA
Delaware	primary, closed	3	10	3	2	18	Statewide WTA
Georgia	primary, open	39	10	3	20	72	WTA district + WTA at-large/bonus
Illinois	presidential preference primary+delegate election, open	57	10	3	0	70	District delegate election + unpledged state delegates
Massachusetts	primary, modified open	30	10	3	0	43	statewide proportional
Minnesota	caucus, open	24	10	3	4	41	BPOU/district/state convention
Missouri	primary, open	27	10	3	18	58	statewide WTA
Montana	invited caucus	3	10	3	9	25	Statewide WTA
New Jersey	primary, modified open	39	10	3	0	52	Statewide WTA
New York	primary, closed	87	10	3	1	101	Statewide WTA
North Dakota	caucus, closed	3	10	3	10	26	Statewide Proportional
Oklahoma	primary, closed	15	10	3	13	41	district WTA + at-large/bonus WTA
Tennessee	primary, open	27	10	3	15	55	District proportional (WTA 50%+) + At-large/bonus proportional (WTA 50%+)
Utah	primary, modified open	9	10	3	14	36	Statewide WTA
West Virginia	convention, modified open	9	10	3	8	18/30	multiple ballot WTA
Totals		627	210	63	181	1,069/1,081	

=== After Super Tuesday ===
Date	State	Type	District-Level Delegates	At-Large Delegates	State Party Delegates	Bonus Delegates	Total Size of Delegation	Delegate Selection Process
February 9, 2008	Kansas	caucus, closed	12	10	3	14	39	district WTA + at-large/state party/bonus WTA
February 9, 2008	Washington	caucus	27	10	3	0	18 of 40	county/state convention
February 9, 2008	Louisiana	primary	0	20	3	13	20 of 57	WTA if 50%+ threshold met, otherwise uncommitted
February 12, 2008	District of Columbia	primary	0	16	3	0	19	DC-wide WTA
February 12, 2008	Maryland	primary	24	10	3	0	37	District WTA + at-large WTA
February 12, 2008	Virginia	primary	33	10	3	17	63	Statewide WTA
February 19, 2008	Wisconsin	primary	24	10	3	3	40	district WTA + at-large/bonus/party WTA
February 19, 2008	Washington	primary	27	10	3	0	19 of 40	district WTA + proportional at-large
February 23, 2008	American Samoa	caucus	0	6	3	0	9	county/state convention
February 23, 2008	Northern Mariana Islands	caucus	0	6	3	0	9	county/state convention
February 24, 2008	Puerto Rico	caucus	0	20	3	0	23	Puerto Rico-wide WTA
March 4, 2008	Ohio	primary	54	10	3	21	88	District WTA + at-large WTA
March 4, 2008	Rhode Island	primary	6	10	3	1	20	Delegate names on ballot
March 4, 2008	Texas	open primary	96	10	3	31	140	district modified WTA + statewide WTA if 50%+
March 4, 2008	Vermont	primary	3	10	3	1	17	Statewide WTA
March 8, 2008	Guam	caucus	0	6	3	0	9	county/state convention
March 11, 2008	Mississippi	primary	12	10	3	14	39	District WTA + at-large/bonus WTA
April 5, 2008	U.S. Virgin Islands	caucus	0	6	3	0	9	county/state convention
April 22, 2008	Pennsylvania	primary	57	10	3	4	74	district delegate selection + unpledged at-large/party delegates
May 6, 2008	Indiana	primary	27	10	3	17	57	
May 6, 2008	North Carolina	primary	39	10	3	17	69	
May 13, 2008	Nebraska	primary	9	10	3	11	33	
May 13, 2008	West Virginia	primary	9	10	3	8	12 of 30	
May 20, 2008	Kentucky	primary	18	10	3	14	45	
May 20, 2008	Oregon	primary	15	10	3	2	30	
May 27, 2008	Idaho	primary	6	10	3	13	32	
June 3, 2008	South Dakota	primary	3	10	3	11	27	
June 3, 2008	New Mexico	primary	9	10	3	10	32	
							1,029	

== See also ==
- 2008 Democratic Party presidential primaries
