= Timeline of the 2008 United States presidential election =

- November 4, 2008

The following is a timeline of major events leading up to and immediately following the United States presidential election of 2008. The election was the 56th quadrennial United States presidential election. It was held on November 4, 2008, but its significant events and background date back to about 2002. The Democratic Party nominee, Senator Barack Obama of Illinois, defeated the Republican Party's nominee, Senator John McCain of Arizona.

Democratic Party ticket

Senator Barack Obama

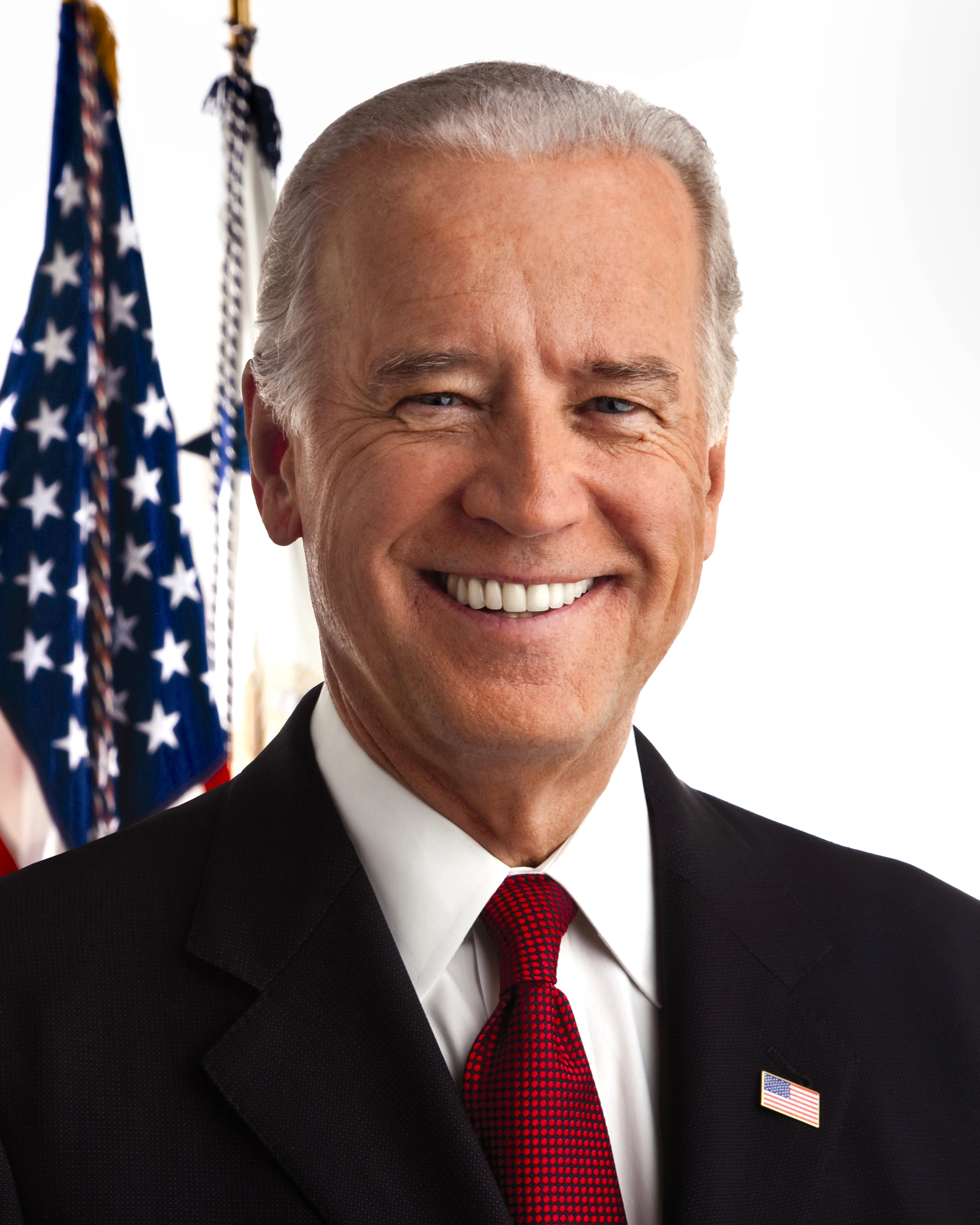
Senator Joe Biden

Republican Party ticket

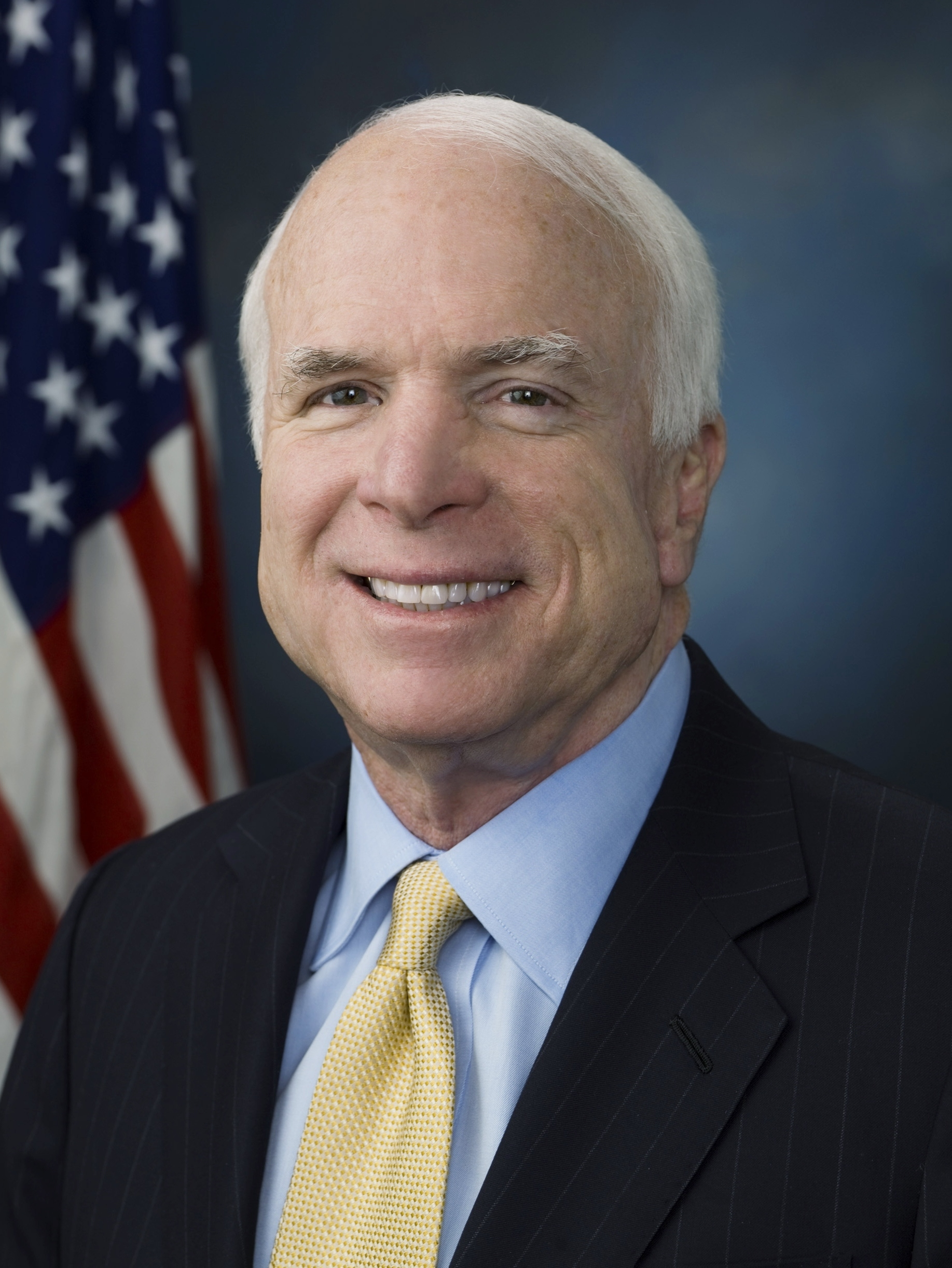
Senator John McCain

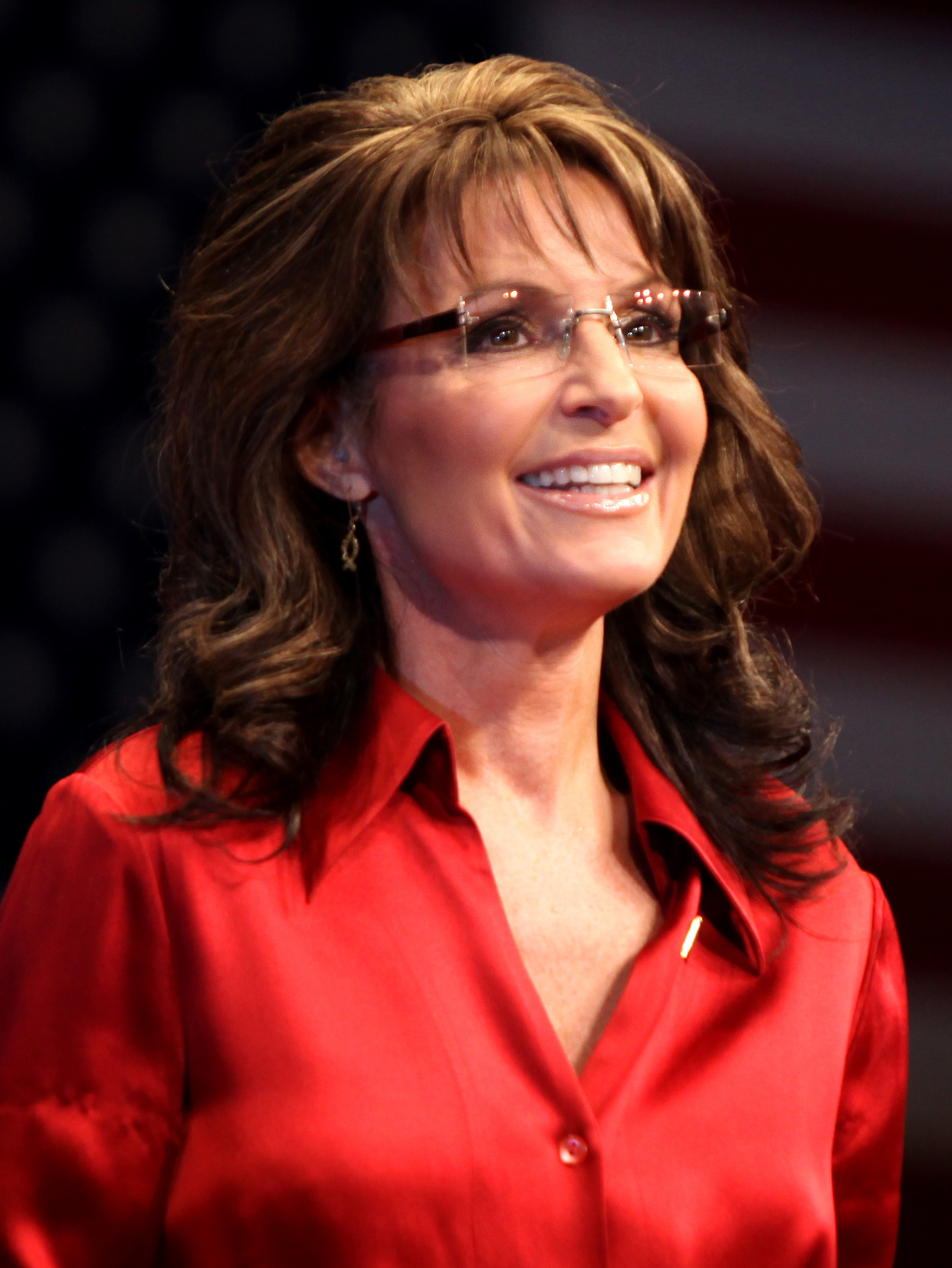
Governor Sarah Palin

== 2002 ==
=== October 2002 ===
- October 2 – Columnist Maureen Dowd writes an article in The New York Times entitled "Can Hillary Upgrade?", which claims that former First Lady Hillary Clinton, serving as the junior United States senator from New York, has softened her criticism of the then-pending invasion of Iraq because "Clinton knows that any woman who hopes to be elected president cannot afford to be seen as too much of a dove", and that she might seek the Democratic Party's nomination in 2008.

== 2003 ==
=== November 2003 ===
- November 27 – In an interview with the German magazine Bunte, Hillary Clinton states that she will not be a candidate for the presidency in 2004, and when told that some were disappointed with that decision, replies "I know. Well, perhaps I'll do it next time around." This is interpreted to mean that she will consider a run in the 2008 race, if the 2004 Democratic nominee is unsuccessful.

== 2004 ==
=== July 2004 ===
- July 27 – Illinois State Senator and United States Senate candidate Barack Obama delivers the keynote address at the Democratic National Convention. After the speech, MSNBC's Chris Mathews praises Obama's performance and predicts that he will someday be the nation's first African American president saying "I have seen the first black president there".

=== November 2004 ===
- November 2 – President George W. Bush wins re-election defeating Senator John Kerry in the 2004 United States presidential election.
- November 9 – Following John Kerry's loss in the 2004 election, Cameron Kerry, John Kerry's brother and political confidante states in regards to another presidential run "That's conceivable... I don't know why that [last week's loss] should necessarily be it. I think it's too early to assess. But I think that he is going to continue to fight on for the values, ideals, and issues this campaign is about."

== 2005 ==
=== February 2005 ===
- February 7 – After the second inauguration of George W. Bush, in an interview with Fox News Sunday, Vice President Dick Cheney is asked whether he will seek the Republican nomination for the presidency in 2008. He replies "I've got my plans laid out, I'm going to serve this president for the next four years and then I'm out of here." When pressed further, Cheney responds to a potential presidential run by stating "Not only no, but hell no" and quotes General William Tecumseh Sherman's famous statement "If nominated, I will not run. If elected, I will not serve."

== 2006 ==
=== March 2006 ===
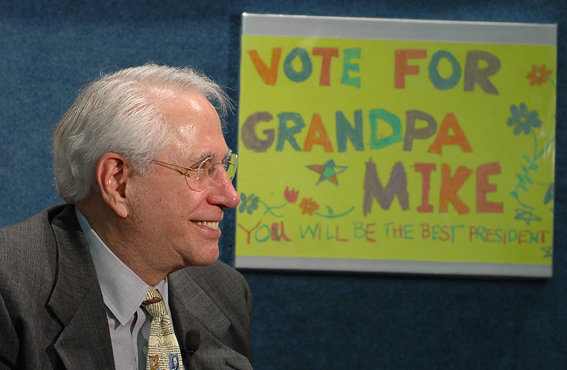
Mike Gravel at the launch of his presidential campaign

- March 11 – The 2006 Southern Republican Leadership Conference Hotline Straw Poll is won by Senate Majority Leader Bill Frist with 36.9 percent of the vote.
- March 21 – United States senator and 1988 presidential candidate Joe Biden of Delaware announces that he will seek the Democratic nomination in 2008.

=== April 2006 ===
- April 17 – Former United States Senator Mike Gravel of Alaska states his intention to run for the Democratic presidential nomination a speech before the National Press Club.

=== May 2006 ===
- May 20 – The Wisconsin State Republican Convention Straw Poll is won by United States Senator George Allen of Virginia, with 17.4 percent of the vote.
- May 22 – Senator Christopher Dodd of Connecticut tells The Hartford Courant that he has "decided to do all the things that are necessary to prepare to seek the presidency in 2008."

=== October 2006 ===
- October 12 – Former Democratic Governor of Virginia Mark Warner states that he will not seek the presidency in 2008.
- October 22 – Despite having stated that "I can unequivocally say I will not be running for national office in four years", Senator Barack Obama of Illinois states in relation to a presidential run "I don't want to be coy about this: given the responses that I've been getting over the last several months, I have thought about the possibility, but I have not thought about it with the seriousness and depth that I think is required ... After November 7, I'll sit down and consider, and if at some point I change my mind, I will make a public announcement and everybody will be able to go at me."
- October 30 – Massachusetts Senator John Kerry makes a "botched joke" about education and the Iraq War, which dominates the news for several days. Republican Representative Duncan Hunter of California announces the formation of an exploratory committee for a presidential run.

=== November 2006 ===
- November 9 – Outgoing Democratic Governor of Iowa Tom Vilsack announces that he will be a candidate for the Democratic nomination.
- November 10 – Republican Senator John McCain of Arizona announces the formation of a presidential exploratory committee. Rudy Giuliani, the former Republican Mayor of New York City, forms a presidential exploratory committee.
- November 12 – Wisconsin Senator Russ Feingold, a prominent member of the Democratic Party's progressive wing, withdraws his name from the race.
- November 15 – Former Republican Governor of Wisconsin and Secretary of Health and Human Services Tommy Thompson announces that he intends to form a presidential exploratory committee in early 2007.
- November 29 – Republican Senator and Senate Majority Leader Bill Frist of Tennessee withdraws his name from the race.
- November 30 – Tom Vilsack announces that he is running for president.

=== December 2006 ===
- December 1 – Democratic Senator Evan Bayh of Indiana announces the formation of an exploratory committee. On The Tonight Show, Democratic Senator Barack Obama of Illinois states he is considering running for president.
- December 2 – Former Democratic Senator and former Senate Minority Leader of South Dakota Tom Daschle withdraws his name from the race.
- December 3 – Democratic Senator Hillary Clinton begins discussions with New York Democratic officials to indicate the possibility of a 2008 presidential campaign and to ask for their support if she does.
- December 4 – Republican Senator Sam Brownback of Kansas announces the formation of an exploratory committee.
- December 9 – Republican Senator George Allen of Virginia, who had lost a close campaign for re-election to Jim Webb, announces that he will not run for president. Democratic Governor of New Mexico Bill Richardson states that he will decide in January whether to form an exploratory committee.
- December 11 – Democratic Representative and 2004 presidential candidate Dennis Kucinich of Ohio announces his plans to run for president in a report by the Associated Press.
- December 16 – Democratic Senator Evan Bayh of Indiana withdraws from the race, citing his status as "a relatively unknown candidate".
- December 17 – Former Democratic Senator, 2004 presidential candidate and 2004 vice presidential nominee John Edwards of North Carolina announces he will formally begin his candidacy later in the month.
- December 19 – Former Virginia Governor Jim Gilmore announces he is setting up an exploratory committee, saying that he is a "Reagan Republican."
- December 28 – John Edwards officially launches his campaign in New Orleans, Louisiana, following an Internet glitch causing his website to announce his candidacy earlier than planned.

== 2007 ==
=== January 2007 ===
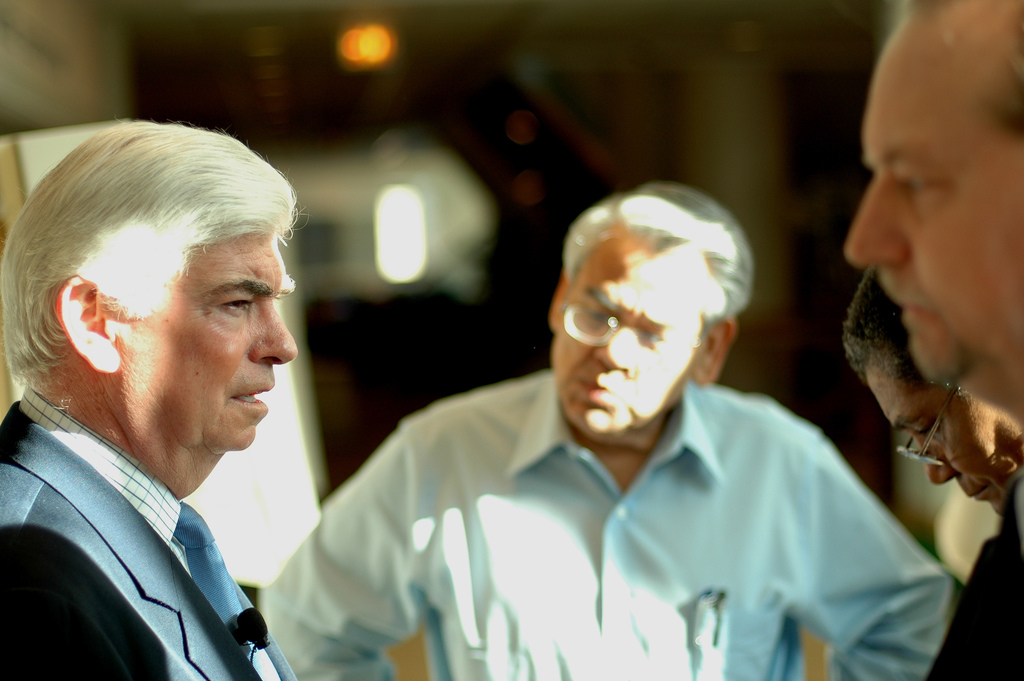
Chris Dodd speaks at a Service Employees International Union event, January 21, 2007.

- January 1 – Republican candidate Rudy Giuliani's campaign strategy is made public in the New York Daily News. Giuliani claims the material was stolen while the News claims it was left in a hotel accidentally.
- January 3 – Outgoing Republican Governor of Massachusetts Mitt Romney sets up a presidential exploratory committee.
- January 5 – Republican Senator Sam Brownback of Kansas's exploratory committee announces his campaign will officially start on January 20.
- January 7 – Democratic Senator Joe Biden of Delaware declares he is running, and will set up an exploratory committee later in the month.
- January 9 – Civil rights activist and 2004 Democratic candidate Al Sharpton says that he is considering another run for president.
- January 11 – Democratic Senator Christopher Dodd of Connecticut officially announces his candidacy. Republican Representative Ron Paul of Texas announces the formation of a presidential exploratory committee. The Democratic National Committee announces that it will hold its 2008 National Convention in Denver, Colorado.
- January 15 – Republican Representative Tom Tancredo of Colorado establishes an exploratory committee.
- January 17 – Democratic Senator Barack Obama of Illinois announces that he is forming an exploratory committee.
- January 20 – Democratic Senator Hillary Clinton announces that she is forming an exploratory committee. Republican Senator Sam Brownback of Kansas officially announces his candidacy for the 2008 Republican presidential nomination in a rally in his home state.
- January 21 – Democratic Governor Bill Richardson of New Mexico announces the formation of a presidential exploratory committee.
- January 24 – 2004 Democratic nominee John Kerry rules out a presidential run to seek re-election to his United States Senate seat.
- January 25 – Republican Representative Duncan Hunter of California formally and officially becomes a candidate.
- January 28 – Mike Huckabee officially announces his candidacy on Meet the Press.
- January 31 – Democratic Senator Joe Biden of Delaware formally and officially becomes a candidate.

=== February 2007 ===
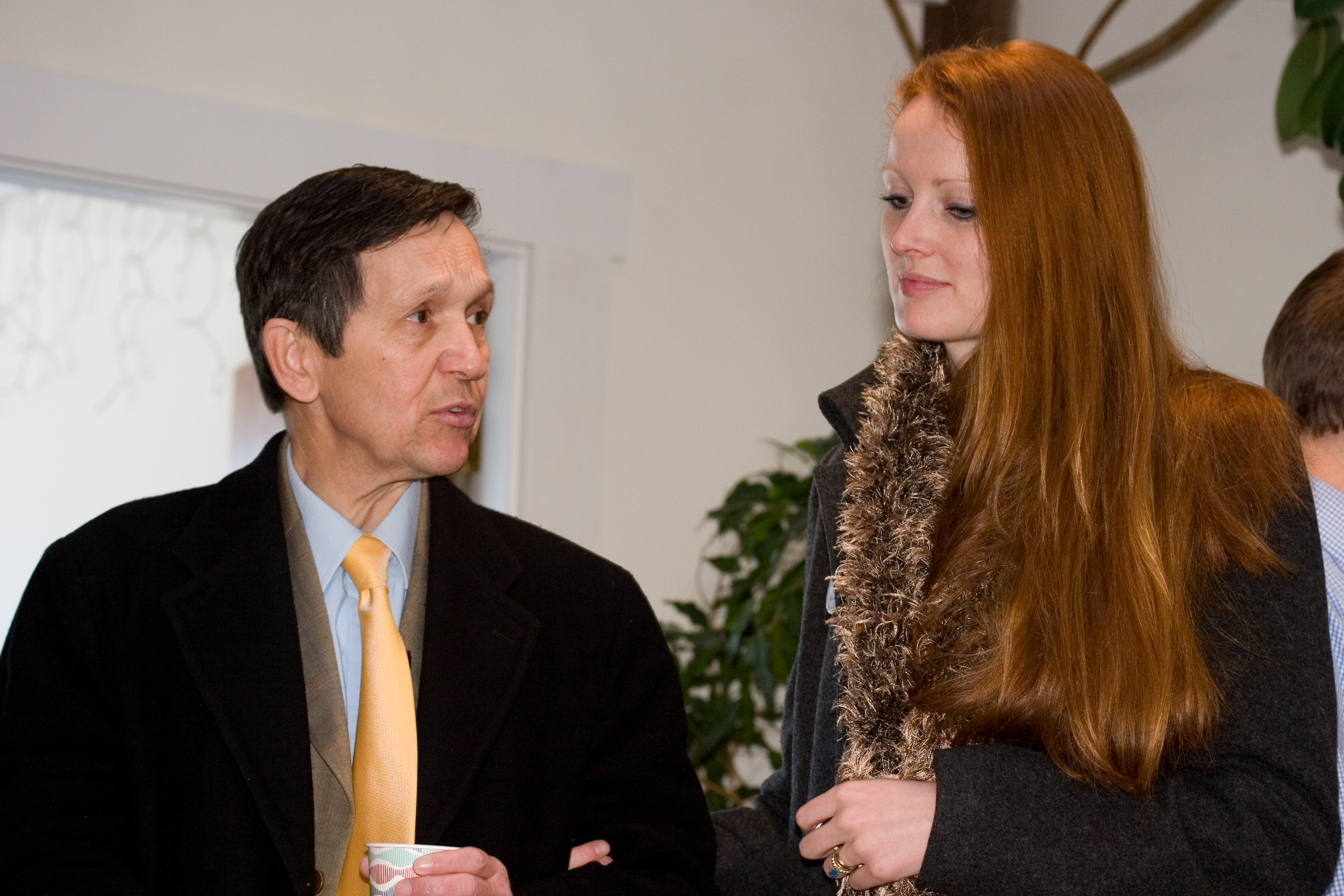
Dennis and Elizabeth Kucinich in Portsmouth, New Hampshire, February 4, 2007

- February 1 – The Democratic National Committee's annual winter meeting convenes in Washington, D.C., featuring ten presidential candidates.
- February 5 – Former Republican Mayor of New York City Rudy Giuliani files a statement of candidacy with the Federal Election Commission.
- February 10 – Democratic Senator Barack Obama of Illinois formally and officially announces his candidacy.
- February 13 – Former Republican Governor Mitt Romney of Massachusetts formally and officially announces his candidacy.
- February 21 – The first presidential forum is held in Carson City.
- February 23 – Former Democratic Governor Tom Vilsack of Iowa withdraws from the race, citing money problems.
- February 28 – Republican John McCain of Arizona states that he will formally announce his candidacy in April.

=== March 2007 ===
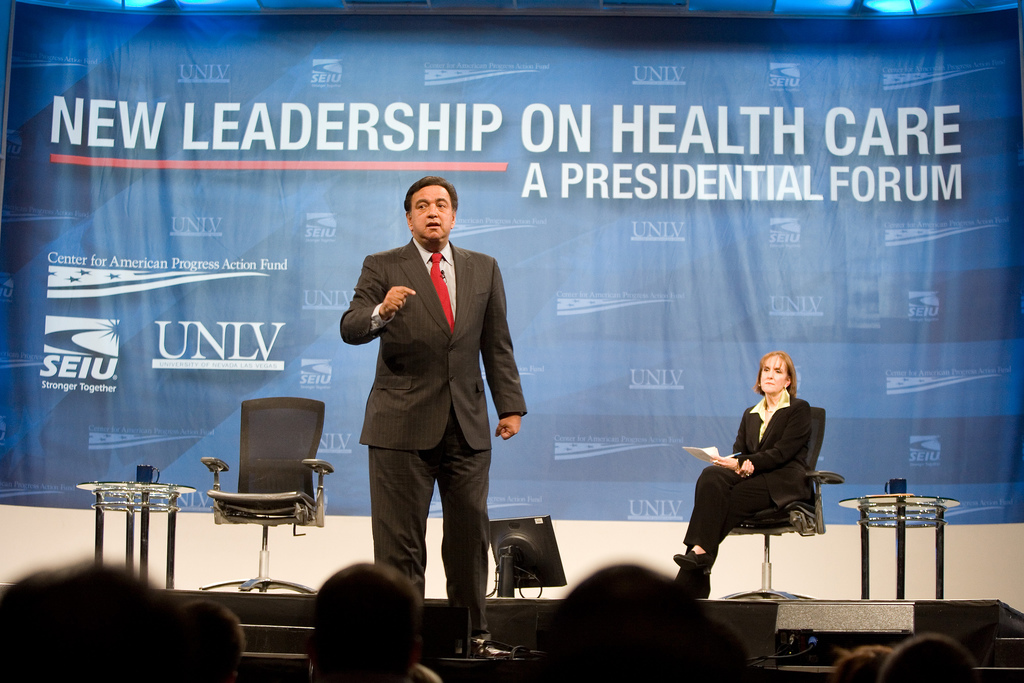
Bill Richardson at the University of Nevada, Las Vegas Presidential Health Care Forum, March 2007

- March 1 – John McCain wins the Spartanburg County, South Carolina Republican Party straw poll, with 22.6 percent of the vote.
- March 3 – The Conservative Political Action Conference straw poll is won by Mitt Romney with 21 percent of the vote. 1,705 votes are cast.
- March 9 – A Nevada Democratic debate is canceled to protest editorial policies of Fox News.
- March 11 – Former Republican Senator Fred Thompson of Tennessee announces on Fox News that he is considering a presidential campaign.
- March 12 – Republican Representative Ron Paul of Texas announces his candidacy on C-SPAN.
- March 22 – Democratic candidate John Edwards's wife Elizabeth announces that her breast cancer has become malignant, but her husband's campaign will go on.

=== April 2007 ===
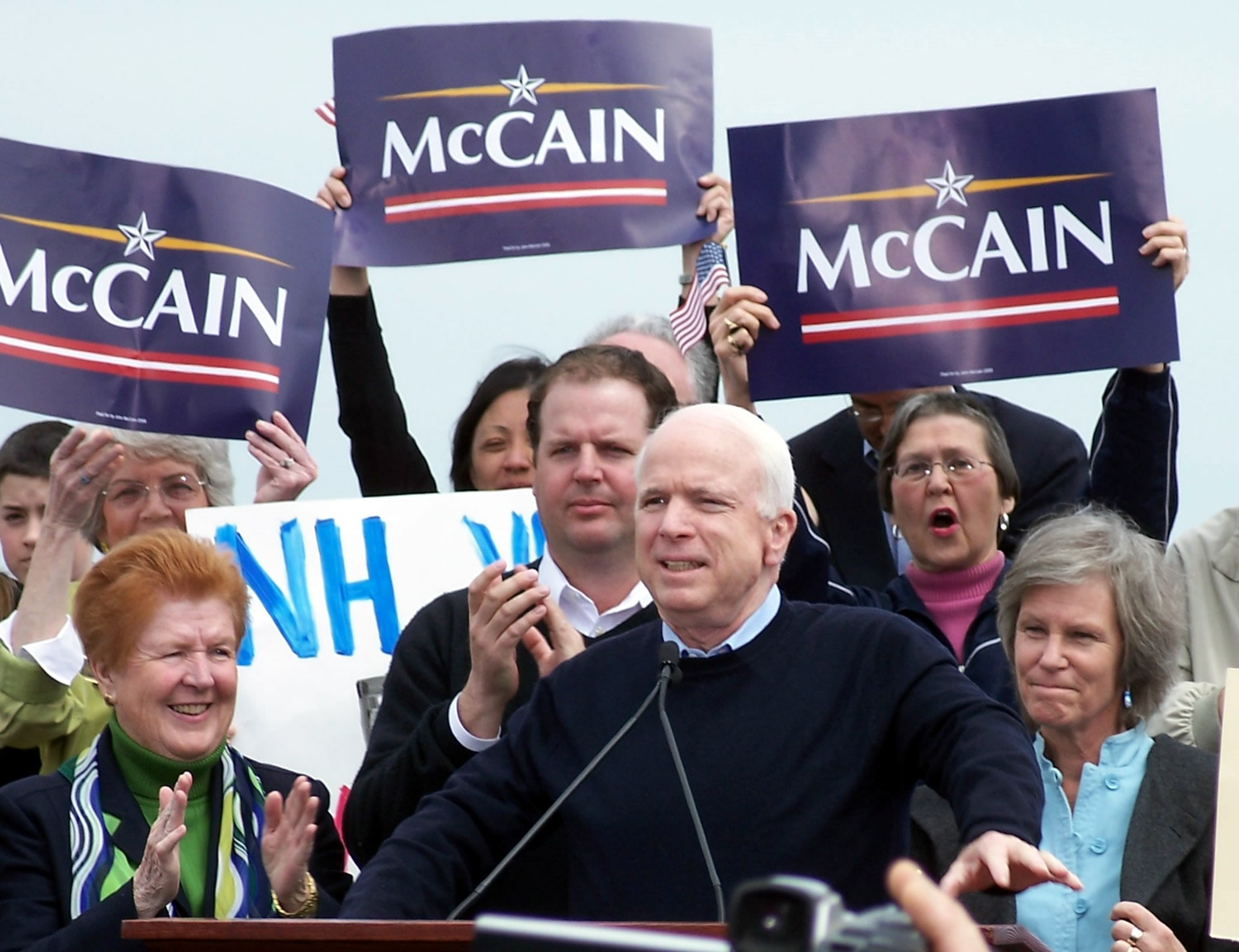
John McCain announces his presidential candidacy in Portsmouth, New Hampshire, April 25, 2007.

- April 1 – Former Republican Governor of Wisconsin and Secretary of Health and Human Services Tommy Thompson announces his presidential candidacy.
- April 2 – Republican Representative Tom Tancredo of Colorado announces his presidential candidacy.
- April 12 – Barack Obama wins a straw poll held at a virtual town hall debate between the Democratic candidates on the subject of the Iraq War, with 27.87 percent of the vote. 4,882 votes are cast.
- April 25–April 27 – John McCain launches his presidential campaign with stops in New Hampshire, South Carolina, Iowa and Arizona.
- April 26 – Former Virginia Governor Jim Gilmore formally announces his candidacy for the Republican nomination. The South Carolina Democratic Party hosts a presidential debate at South Carolina State University in Orangeburg County.
- April 28 – The California State Democratic Convention is attended by seven of the eight major candidates.

=== May 2007 ===
- May 3 – MSNBC and Politico air a Republican presidential debate at the Ronald Reagan Presidential Library in Simi Valley, California.
- May 12 – The Wispolitics.com Republican convention straw poll is won by Senator Fred Thompson, with 31 percent of the vote. 306 votes are cast. Michael Chertoff, the Secretary of Homeland Security, announces that the United States Secret Service will provide protection for Democratic candidate Barack Obama, the earliest date at which the Secret Service has ever done so.
- May 14 – Former Republican Speaker of the House of Representatives Newt Gingrich proclaims that there is a 'great possibility' that he will run for president.
- May 15 – The South Carolina Republican Party hosts a presidential debate at the University of South Carolina's Koger Center for the Arts in Columbia, South Carolina.
- May 20 – The Georgia Republican Convention straw poll is won by former senator Fred Thompson, with 44 percent of the vote. 429 delegates participate.
- May 21 – Democratic Governor Bill Richardson of New Mexico formally and officially enters the race.

=== June 2007 ===
- June 3 – CNN hosts a Democratic debate in New Hampshire.
- June 4 – A presidential forum hosted by Sojourners Magazine featuring Senators Hillary Clinton and Barack Obama, and former senator John Edwards is broadcast on CNN.
- June 5 – CNN hosts a Republican debate in New Hampshire.
- June 6 – Republican candidates Senator John McCain and former Mayor Rudy Giuliani announce they will not contest the Ames Straw Poll.
- June 28 – The Public Broadcasting Service host a Democratic debate at Howard University in Washington, D.C.

=== July 2007 ===
- July 1 – A Republican forum is held in Des Moines, Iowa, co-sponsored by the Iowa Christian Alliance and Iowans for Tax Relief.
- July 2 – Facing severe financial problems, Republican candidate John McCain fires over a hundred campaign staffers and publicly considers accepting matching funds.
- July 10 – John Weaver and Terry Nelson, respectively John McCain's chief strategist and campaign manager, resign.
- July 12 – A Republican debate is held in Detroit, Michigan. Only Tom Tancredo attends. The National Association for the Advancement of Colored People hosts a presidential forum.
- July 14 – Republican candidate Jim Gilmore of Virginia announces that he is dropping out of the race for the Republican nomination.
- July 23 – A Democratic debate is hosted by YouTube and CNN in Charleston, South Carolina.

=== August 2007 ===
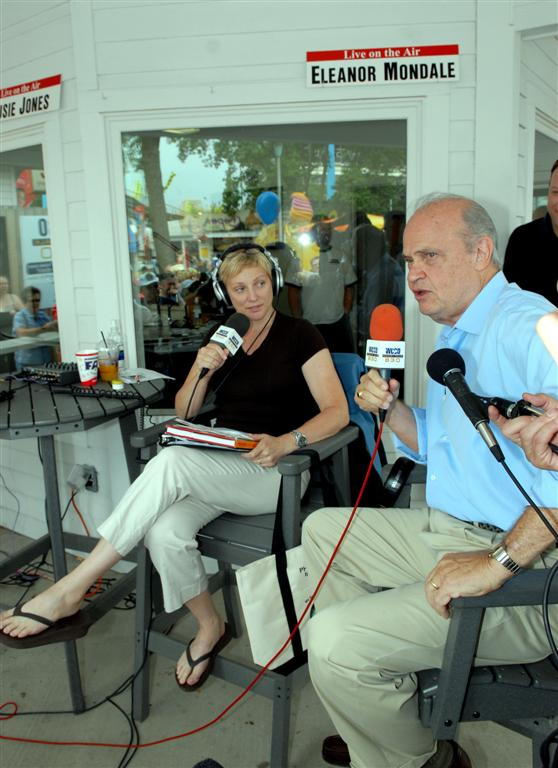
Fred Thompson is interviewed by Eleanor Mondale at the Minnesota State Fair, August 27, 2007.

- August 4 – YearlyKos holds its Presidential Leadership Forum, which is attended by seven of the eight Democratic candidates.
- August 5 – A Republican debate is hosted by ABC News in Des Moines, Iowa.
- August 7 – MSNBC and the AFL–CIO host a Democratic debate over labor issues in Chicago, Illinois.
- August 9 – The Human Rights Campaign sponsors a Democratic forum on LGBT issues in Los Angeles.
- August 11 – The Ames Straw Poll is won by Mitt Romney, with 31.5 percent of the vote. 14,302 ballots are cast.
- August 12 – Tommy Thompson announces that he is dropping out of the race for the Republican nomination due to a poor showing in the Ames Straw Poll.
- August 16 – Mitt Romney wins the Illinois State Fair's Republican straw poll, with 40.5 percent of the vote. 922 votes are cast.
- August 19 – A Democratic debate is hosted by ABC in Des Moines, Iowa.

=== September 2007 ===
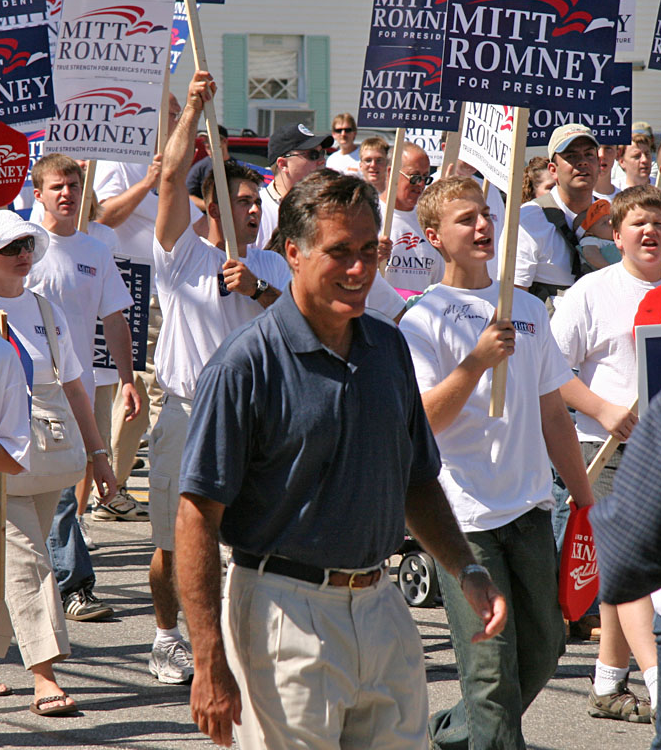
Mitt Romney at a Labor Day parade in Milford, New Hampshire, September 1, 2007

- September 1 – The Texas Republican straw poll is won by Representative Duncan Hunter of California, with 41 percent of the vote.
- September 5 – A New Hampshire Republican debate is sponsored by Fox News.
- September 6 – Senator Fred Thompson of Tennessee officially announces his candidacy for the Republican nomination.
- September 9 – Univision broadcasts a Democratic debate held at the BankUnited Center at the University of Miami in Coral Gables, Florida.
- September 12 – Yahoo! and The Huffington Post host a Democratic "mashup" debate, allowing viewers to choose which candidates they want to hear from on specific issues.
- September 15 – Activist and diplomat Alan Keyes announces his candidacy for the Republican nomination in a radio interview with Janet Parshall.
- September 17 – A Republican debate is held at the Broward Center for the Performing Arts in Fort Lauderdale, Florida.
- September 21 – The Mackinac Republican Leadership Conference is held at the Grand Hotel in Mackinac Island, Michigan, featuring the traditional straw poll, which is won by Mitt Romney with 39 percent of the vote.
- September 26 – New England Cable News, NBC News, Dartmouth College and New Hampshire Public Radio host a Democratic debate at Dartmouth College in Hanover, New Hampshire.
- September 27 – The Public Broadcasting Service hosts a Republican debate at Morgan State University in Baltimore, Maryland.
- September 28 – Former Speaker of the House of Representatives Newt Gingrich tells supporters that if they raise $30 million in a month, he will run for president.
- September 29 – Newt Gingrich announces that he definitely will not run.

=== October 2007 ===
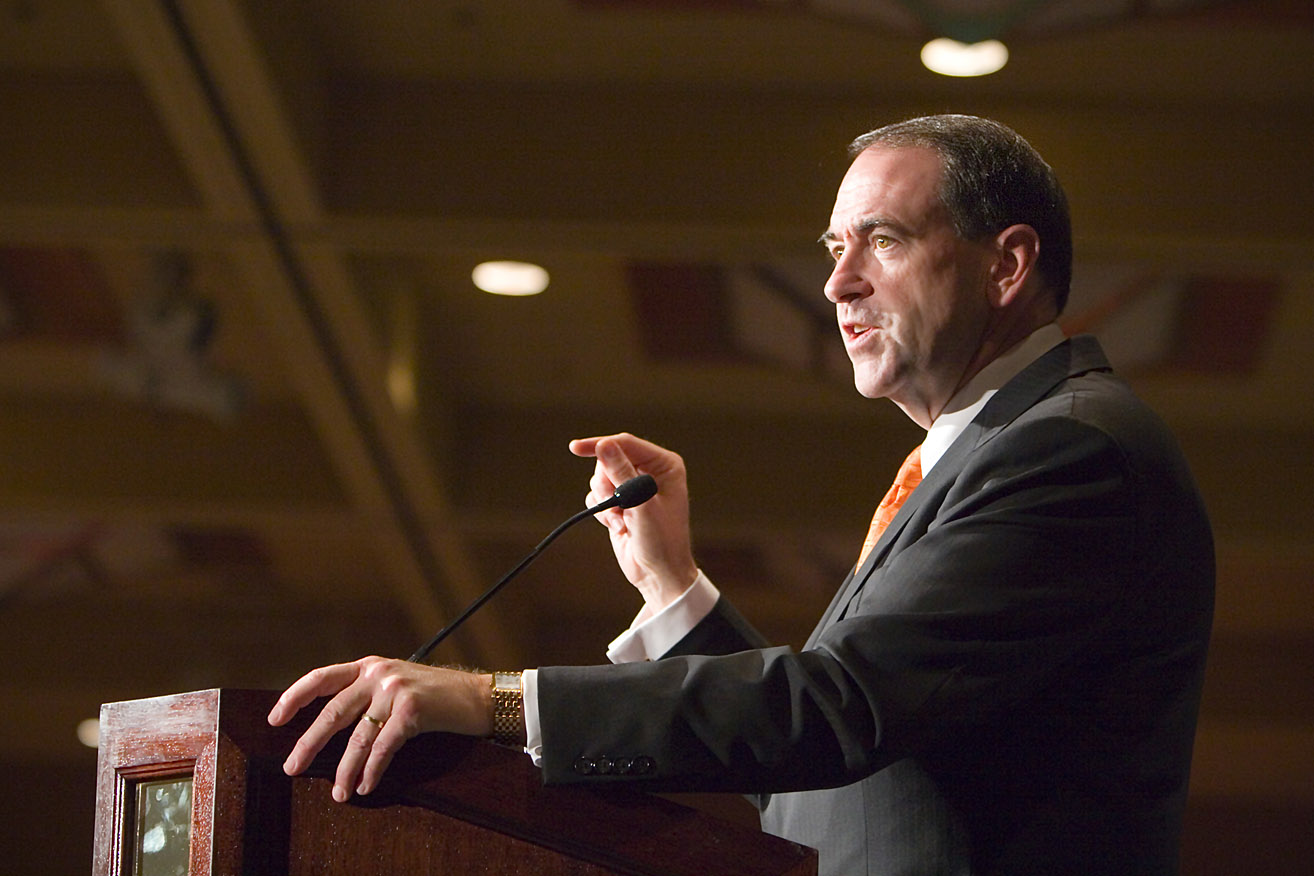
Mike Huckabee speaking in Southern California, October 2007

- October 9 – A Republican debate is held in Dearborn, Michigan. Fred Thompson makes his first debate appearance. The deadline for Michigan presidential primaries passes. Barack Obama, John Edwards, Joe Biden, Bill Richardson and Dennis Kucinich file papers to get their names on the Democratic primary ballot. All 'major' Republicans but Alan Keyes, who begins a petition drive, are on the Republican primary ballot.
- October 12 – Former Republican candidate Tommy Thompson of Wisconsin endorses Rudy Giuliani for president.
- October 16 – Comedian Stephen Colbert announces he is running for president as a favorite son in the South Carolina Democratic and Republican primaries. The Republican Jewish Coalition hosts a Republican debate.
- October 19 – Senator Sam Brownback of Kansas announces that he is dropping out of the race for the Republican nomination.
- October 20 – Orlando, Florida hosts the Values Voter Summit, sponsored by the Family Research Council. A straw poll is held and won by Mitt Romney, with 27.6 percent of the vote. 5,775 votes are cast.
- October 21 – The Florida Republican Party and Fox News Channel co-host a Republican debate in Orlando, Florida.
- October 25 – AARP and Iowa Public Television host a Republican debate in Sioux City, Iowa.
- October 30 – A Democratic debate is hosted by NBC News and MSNBC in Philadelphia.

=== November 2007 ===
- November 5 – Ron Paul raises the most money on a single day of any Republican candidate to date with US$4.3 million. Paul also raises the most money online in a single day.
- November 8 – The Republican National Committee announces that five states will lose half their delegates to Republican National Convention for breaking party rules against holding primaries before February 5.
- November 15 – CNN and the Nevada Democratic Party hold the Nevada Democratic presidential debate at the University of Nevada, Las Vegas.
- November 21 – Democratic candidate Barack Obama announces that television presenter and media mogul Oprah Winfrey, who previously endorsed Obama, will appear with him on the campaign trail.
- November 28 – YouTube and CNN host a Republican debate.
- November 30 – A man takes hostages in Hillary Clinton's New Hampshire campaign office. He is later arrested.

=== December 2007 ===
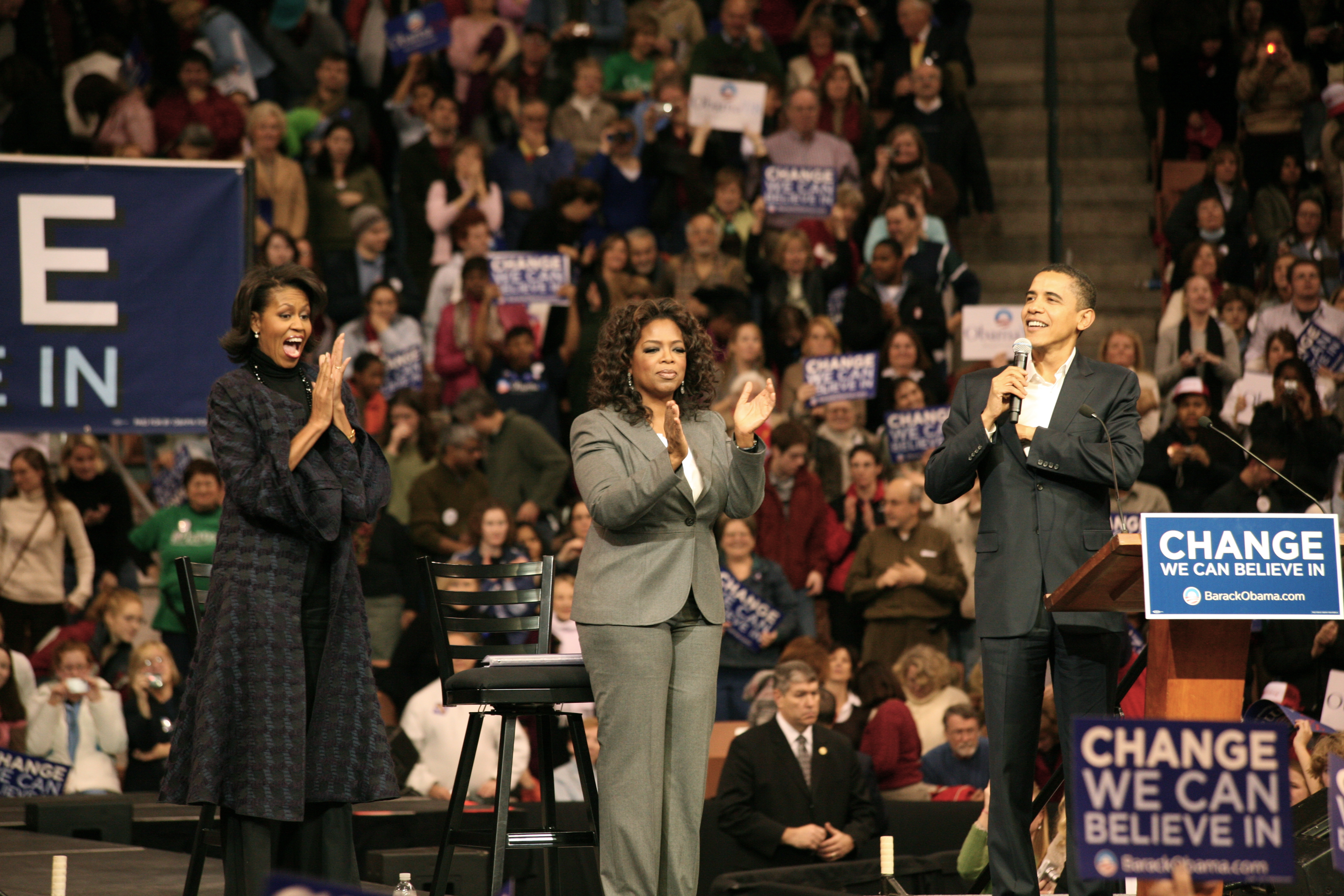
Barack and Michelle Obama campaign with Oprah Winfrey, December 10, 2007.

- December 1 – Over two dozen community organizations co-sponsor the Heartland Presidential Candidates Forum in Des Moines, Iowa. The Democratic National Committee votes to strip Michigan of all its delegates to the Democratic National Convention.
- December 4 – National Public Radio and Iowa Public Radio host a radio-only Democratic debate.
- December 6 – Republican candidate Mitt Romney delivers an address on his faith and religion in the United States at the George Bush Presidential Library.
- December 9 – Univision hosts a Republican debate at the University of Miami, in Coral Gables, Florida.
- December 11 – Former Democratic United States Representative Cynthia McKinney announces her candidacy for the Green Party's presidential nomination.
- December 12 – The Des Moines Register and Iowa Public Television host a Republican debate in Johnston, Iowa.
- December 13 – The Des Moines Register and Iowa Public Television host a Democratic debate in Johnston, Iowa.
- December 14 – The Ron Paul Blimp flies for the first time from Elizabeth City, North Carolina to Chester County, South Carolina.
- December 16 – Republican candidate Ron Paul raises more than $6 million through online donations in 24 hours, breaking his own record of $4.3 million to become the highest figure ever raised in a day.
- December 17 – 2000 Democratic vice presidential nominee Joe Lieberman endorses Republican candidate John McCain.
- December 20 – Republican candidate Tom Tancredo announces that he is dropping out of the race for the Republican nomination. He endorses Mitt Romney.

== 2008 ==
=== January 2008 ===
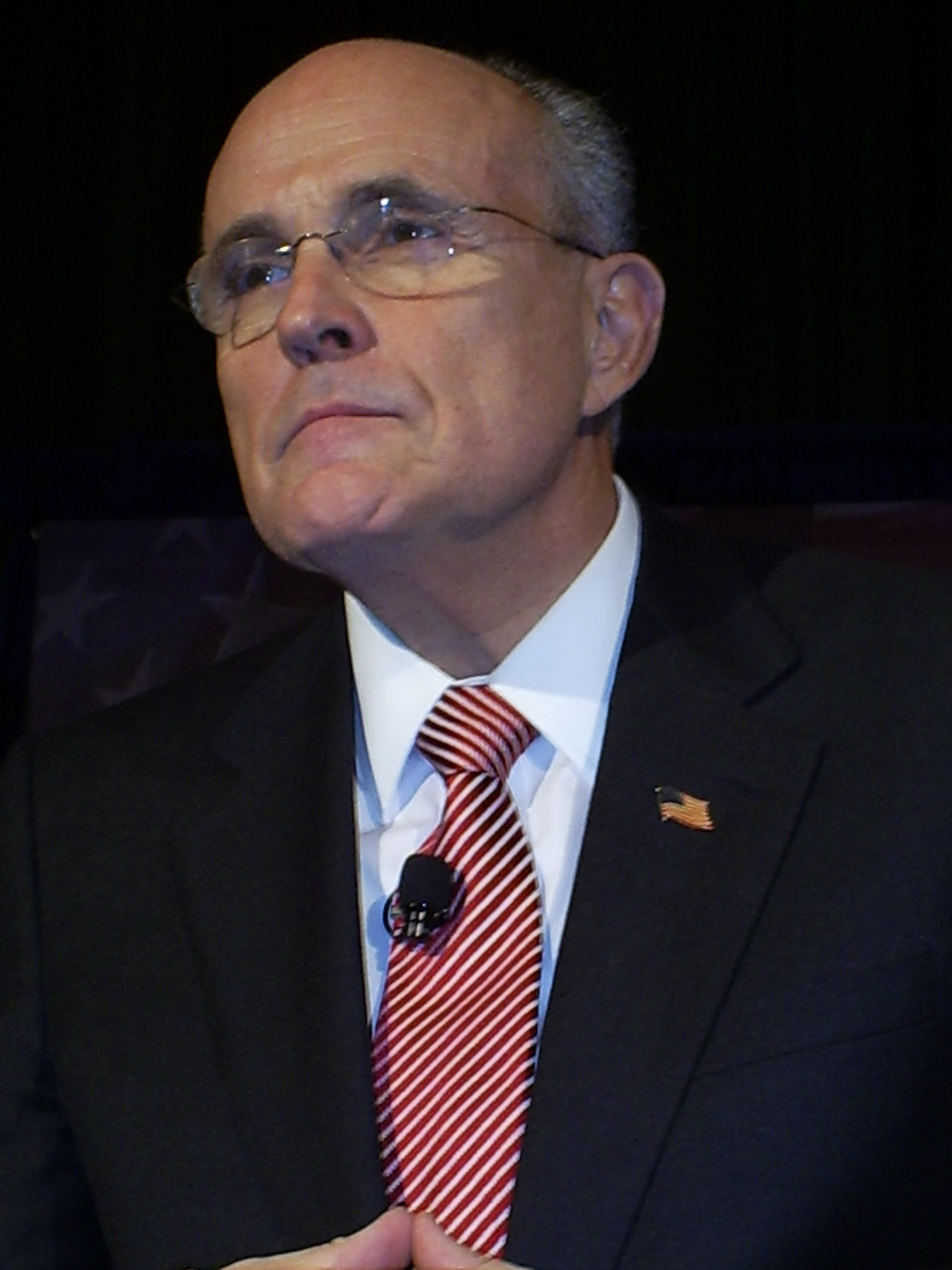
Rudy Giuliani in Derry, New Hampshire, January 7, 2008

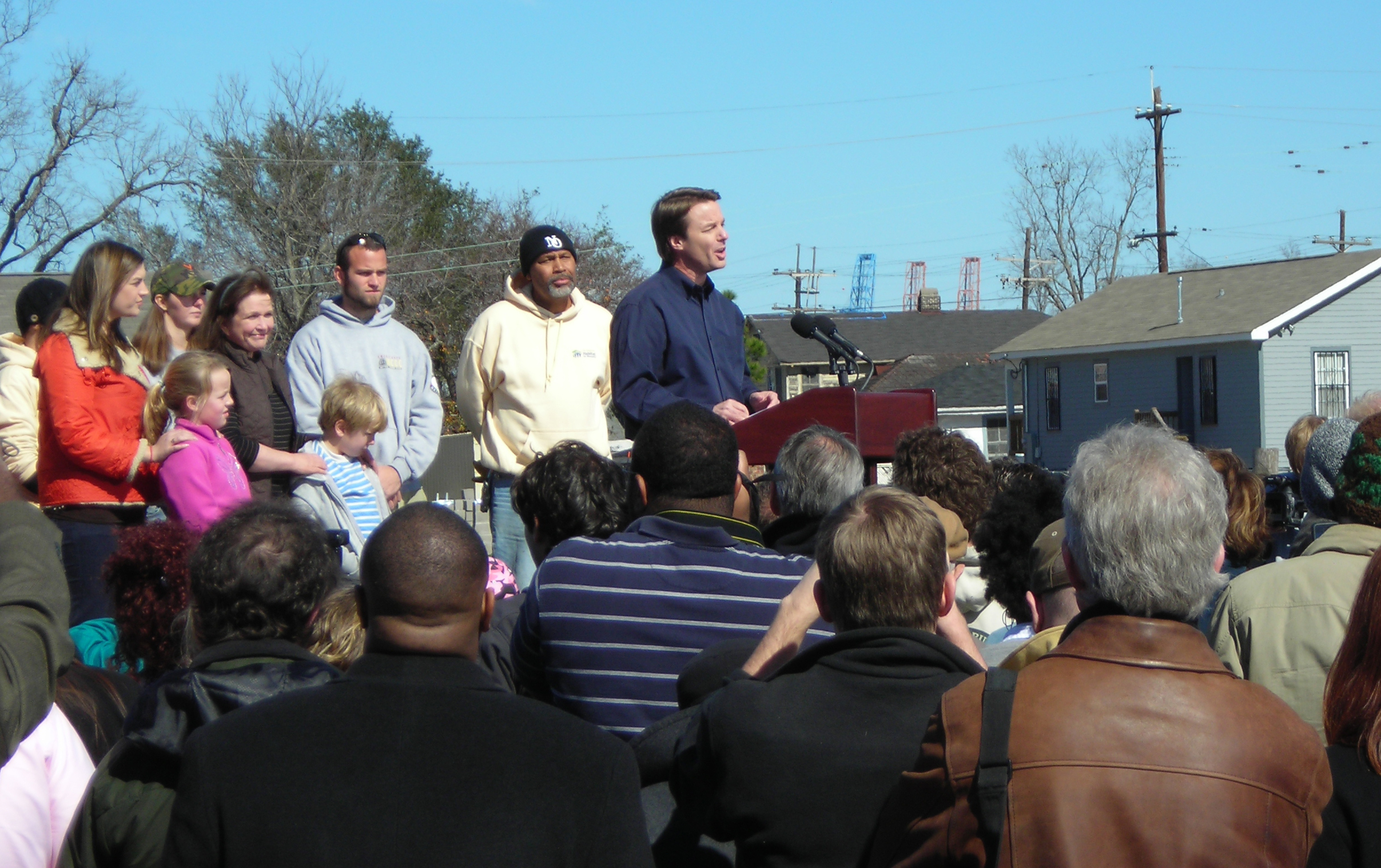
John Edwards announces his withdrawal from the Democratic race in New Orleans, January 30, 2008.

- January 3 – The Iowa Democratic caucus is won by Barack Obama, while the Republican caucus is won by Mike Huckabee. Christopher Dodd and Joe Biden drop out of the Democratic race.
- January 5 – The Wyoming Republican caucus is won by Mitt Romney. ABC, WMUR-TV and Facebook jointly host a Republican debate at Saint Anselm College in Goffstown, New Hampshire.
- January 6 – Fox News Channel hosts a Republican debate in Milford, New Hampshire.
- January 8 – The New Hampshire Democratic primary is won by Hillary Clinton. The Republican primary is won by John McCain. The New Republic publishes an article relating to a selection of newsletters published under the name of Republican candidate Ron Paul. The article describes the newsletters as showing "an obsession with conspiracies, sympathy for the right-wing militia movement, and deeply held bigotry."
- January 10 – Bill Richardson drops out of the Democratic race. Fox News Channel and the South Carolina Republican Party host a Republican debate in South Carolina.
- January 13 – The Green Party holds a debate in San Francisco, featuring Ralph Nader, Cynthia McKinney, Jared Ball, and Kent Mesplay. Ball withdraws from the race and endorses McKinney.
- January 15 – The Michigan Democratic primary is won by Hillary Clinton, though no delegates are awarded. Only Clinton, Dennis Kucinich, Christopher Dodd and Mike Gravel are on the ballot. The Michigan Republican primary is won by Mitt Romney. Hillary Clinton, John Edwards and Barack Obama appear at a Democratic debate in Las Vegas.
- January 19 – The Nevada Democratic caucus is won by Hillary Clinton. The Republican caucus is won by Mitt Romney. The South Carolina Republican primary is won by John McCain. Republican candidate Duncan Hunter ends his campaign.
- January 21 – The Congressional Black Caucus Political Education and Leadership Institute hosts a Democratic debate in South Carolina.
- January 22 – Fred Thompson drops out of the Republican race. The Louisiana Republican caucus is won by the "pro-life uncommitted" slate.
- January 24 – A Republican presidential debate is held at Florida Atlantic University in Boca Raton, Florida. Dennis Kucinich drops out of the Democratic race.
- January 25–February 5 – The Hawaii Republican caucuses are won by John McCain.
- January 26 – The South Carolina Democratic primary is won by Barack Obama.
- January 27 – Caroline and Ted Kennedy endorse Barack Obama.
- January 29 – The Florida Republican primary is won by John McCain. The Democratic primary is won by Hillary Clinton, though no delegates are awarded.
- January 30 – Rudy Giuliani withdraws from the Republican race and endorses John McCain. John Edwards drops out of the Democratic race in New Orleans. Mike Huckabee, Ron Paul, John McCain and Mitt Romney appear at a Republican debate at the Ronald Reagan Presidential Library in Simi Valley, California.
- January 31 – A Democratic debate is held in Los Angeles.

=== February 2008 ===
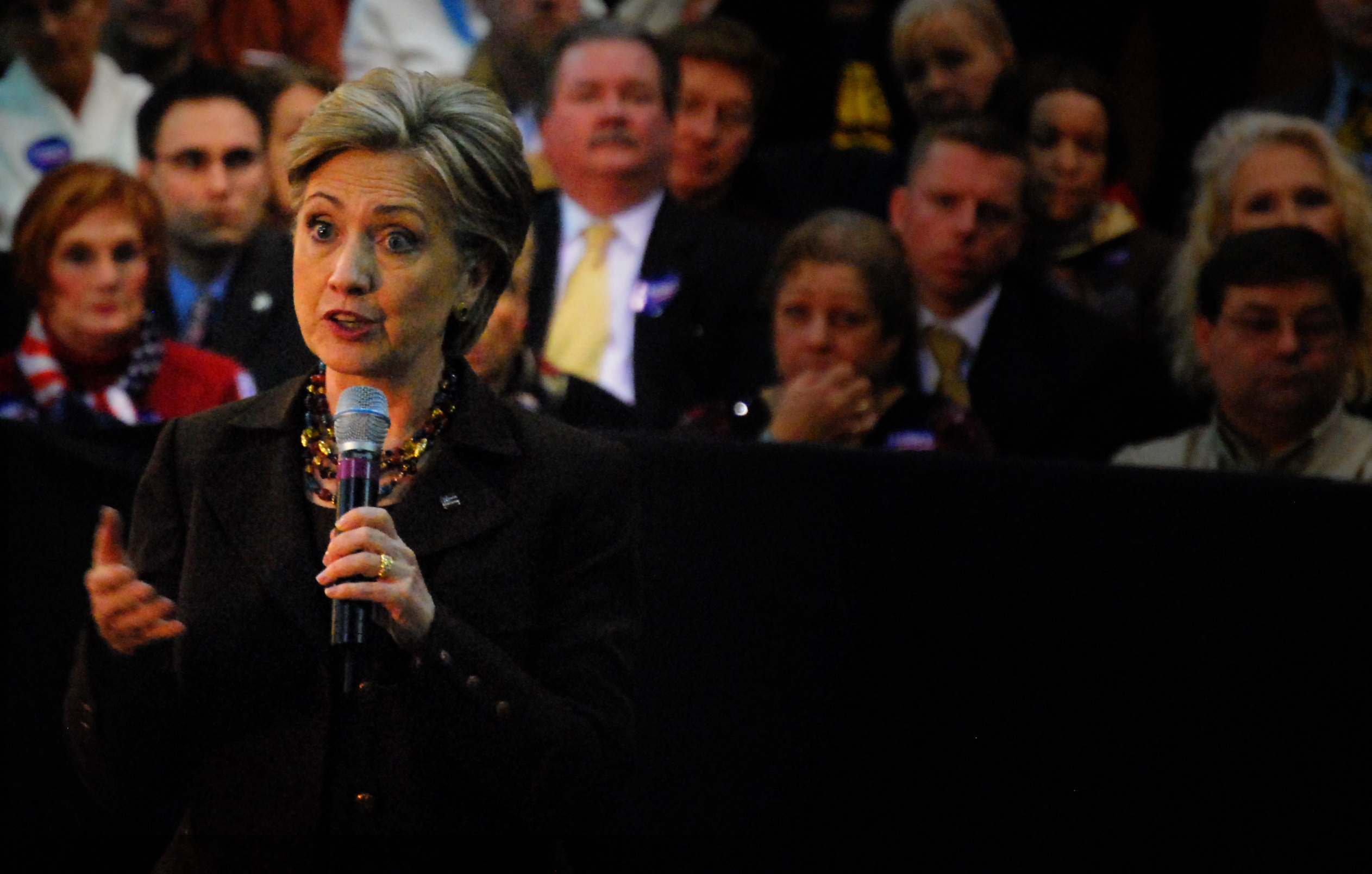
Hillary Clinton in Lorain, Ohio, February 2008

- February 2 – The Maine Republican caucus is won by Mitt Romney. MTV and MySpace co-host a debate, which is attended by Democrats Barack Obama and Hillary Clinton and Republicans Mike Huckabee and Ron Paul.
- February 5 – Twenty-four states and American Samoa hold primaries as a part of Super Tuesday, 2008. Full results:
  - The Alabama Democratic primary is won by Barack Obama. The Republican primary is won by Mike Huckabee.
  - The Alaska Democratic caucus is won by Barack Obama. The Republican caucus is won by Mike Huckabee.
  - The American Samoa Democratic caucus is won by Hillary Clinton.
  - The Arizona Democratic primary is won by Hillary Clinton. The Republican primary is won by John McCain.
  - The Arkansas Democratic primary is won by Hillary Clinton. The Republican primary is won by Mike Huckabee. The Green primary is won by Cynthia McKinney.
  - The California Democratic primary is won by Hillary Clinton. The Republican primary is won by John McCain. The Libertarian primary is won by Christine Smith. The American Independent (the California affiliate of the Constitution Party) primary is won by Don J. Grundmann. The Green and Peace and Freedom primaries are won by Ralph Nader.
  - The Colorado Democratic caucus is won by Barack Obama. The Republican caucus is won by Mitt Romney.
  - The Connecticut Democratic primary is won by Barack Obama. The Republican primary is won by John McCain.
  - The Delaware Democratic primary is won by Barack Obama. The Republican primary is won by John McCain.
  - Voting begins in the Democrats Abroad primary.
  - The Georgia Democratic primary is won by Barack Obama. The Republican primary is won by Mike Huckabee.
  - The Idaho Democratic caucus is won by Barack Obama.
  - The Illinois Democratic primary is won by Barack Obama. The Republican primary is won by John McCain. The Green primary is won by Cynthia McKinney.
  - The Kansas Democratic caucus is won by Barack Obama.
  - The Massachusetts Democratic primary is won by Hillary Clinton. The Republican primary is won by Mitt Romney.
  - The Minnesota Democratic caucus is won by Barack Obama. The Republican caucuses are won by Mitt Romney.
  - The Missouri Democratic primary is won by Barack Obama. The Republican primary is won by John McCain. The Libertarian primary is won by "uncommitted".
  - The Montana Republican caucus is won by Mitt Romney.
  - The New Jersey Democratic primary is won by Hillary Clinton. The Republican primary is won by John McCain.
  - The New Mexico Democratic caucus is won by Hillary Clinton.
  - The New York Democratic primary is won by Hillary Clinton. The Republican primary is won by John McCain.
  - The North Dakota Democratic caucus is won by Barack Obama. The Republican caucus is won by Mitt Romney.
  - The Oklahoma Democratic primary is won by Hillary Clinton. The Republican primary is won by John McCain.
  - The Tennessee Democratic primary is won by Hillary Clinton. The Republican primary is won by Mike Huckabee.
  - The Utah Democratic primary is won by Barack Obama. The Republican primary is won by Mitt Romney.
  - The West Virginia Republican primary is won by Mike Huckabee.
- February 7 – Mitt Romney suspends his campaign.
- February 9 – The Louisiana Democratic primary, Nebraska Democratic caucuses, Washington Democratic caucuses, and the United States Virgin Islands Democratic territorial convention are won by Barack Obama. The Louisiana Republican primary is won by Mike Huckabee. However, as neither Huckabee nor McCain receive 50 percent of the vote, no delegates are assigned. The Kansas Republican caucus is won by Huckabee. John McCain is announced the winner of the Washington Republican caucus, the result of which is challenged by Mike Huckabee.
- February 10 – Hillary Clinton campaign manager Patti Solis Doyle resigns but remains with campaign as senior adviser. Maggie Williams is announced as her successor. The Maine Democratic caucus is won by Barack Obama.
- February 12 – The Washington Republican Party release updated results of the Washington Republican caucus. John McCain remains the winner. Voting ends in the Democrats Abroad primary. Three states hold Democratic and Republican primaries as part of the Potomac primary. The District of Columbia, Maryland, and Virginia Democratic primaries are won by Barack Obama. The District of Columbia, Maryland, and Virginia Republican primaries are won by John McCain.
- February 14 – Mitt Romney endorses John McCain for president.
- February 17 – Barack Obama and former candidate John Edwards meet at Edwards's home in North Carolina to discuss the possibility of Edwards endorsing Obama.
- February 19 – The Washington and Wisconsin Republican primaries are won by John McCain. The Wisconsin Democratic primary, Hawaii caucuses and Washington primary are won by Obama. No delegates are at stake in the Washington Democratic primary.
- February 21 – The New York Times and The Washington Post publish articles suggesting that John McCain may have had an improper relationship with lobbyist Vicki Iseman during his 2000 presidential campaign. (See John McCain lobbyist controversy, February 2008.) The Democrats Abroad primary is officially announced as having been won by Barack Obama. Hillary Clinton and Barack Obama debate in Austin, Texas.
- February 23 – The American Samoa and Northern Mariana Islands Republican caucuses are won by John McCain.
- February 24 – Ralph Nader announces his independent candidacy. John McCain wins the Puerto Rico Republican caucuses.
- February 26 – Hillary Clinton and Barack Obama debate in Ohio. Former Democratic candidate Christopher Dodd endorses Obama.
- February 28 – Independent candidate Ralph Nader announces that Matt Gonzalez, a former member of the San Francisco Board of Supervisors and 2003 mayoral candidate, will be his running mate.

=== March 2008 ===
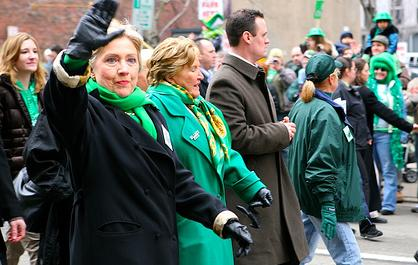
Hillary Clinton attends a St. Patrick's Day parade in Pittsburgh with Catherine Baker Knoll and Luke Ravenstahl. March 15, 2008.

- March 4 – The Ohio, Texas and Rhode Island Democratic primaries are won by Hillary Clinton. The Vermont primary and Texas caucuses are won by Barack Obama. John McCain wins the Ohio, Rhode Island, Vermont and Texas Republican primaries, passing the 1,191-delegate threshold and becoming the Republican presumptive nominee. Mike Huckabee withdraws from the Republican race.
- March 5 – President George W. Bush endorses John McCain.
- March 8 – The Wyoming Democratic caucuses are won by Barack Obama. The Guam Republican caucuses are won by Mike Huckabee.
- March 11 – The Mississippi Democratic primary is won by Barack Obama. The Republican primary is won by John McCain. Democratic candidate Mike Gravel endorses Green Party candidate Jesse Johnson for president.
- March 12 – 1984 Democratic vice presidential nominee Geraldine Ferraro resigns from the Hillary Clinton campaign.
- March 14 – The controversy over Barack Obama's pastor Jeremiah Wright's past remarks on race and patriotism begins. Wright leaves the Obama campaign's spiritual advisory committee.
- March 18 – John McCain embarks on a trip to Europe and the Middle East. Barack Obama gives his "A More Perfect Union" address in Philadelphia.
- March 21 – Former Democratic candidate Bill Richardson endorses Barack Obama.
- March 25 – Hillary Clinton admits that she "misspoke" in campaign comments about a 1996 visit to Bosnia-Herzegovina, in which she claimed to have been under hostile sniper fire. Former First Lady Nancy Reagan endorses John McCain.
- March 26 – Mike Gravel withdraws from the Democratic race and announces that he will seek the Libertarian Party's presidential nomination.

=== April 2008 ===
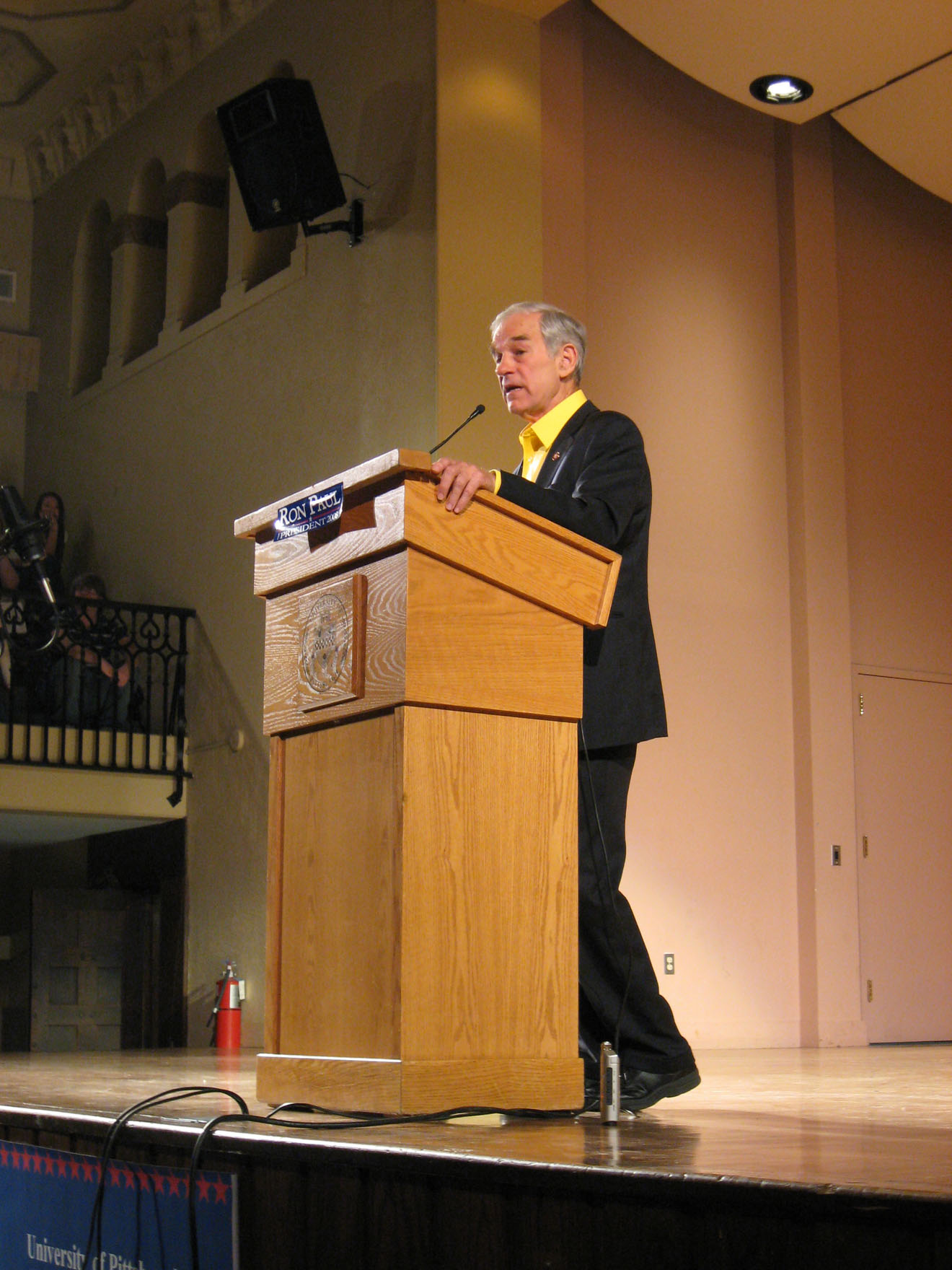
Ron Paul speaks at the University of Pittsburgh, April 3, 2008.

- April 5 – The United States Virgin Islands Republican caucuses are won by "uncommitted".
- April 6 – Democratic candidate Barack Obama makes a controversial comment referring to inhabitants of "small towns in Pennsylvania" as "bitter."
- April 10 – Pastor and 2004 vice presidential nominee Chuck Baldwin declares his candidacy for the Constitution Party's presidential nomination.
- April 13 – Hillary Clinton and Barack Obama appear at "The Compassion Forum" at Messiah College in Grantham, Pennsylvania.
- April 15 – Republican candidate Alan Keyes officially announces that he has left the Republican Party and is considering joining the Constitution Party.
- April 16 – Hillary Clinton and Barack Obama appear at a debate at the National Constitution Center in Philadelphia.
- April 22 – The Pennsylvania Democratic primary is won by Hillary Clinton. The Republican primary is won by John McCain.
- April 24–27 – The Constitution Party's National Convention is held in Kansas City, Missouri. Chuck Baldwin and Darrell Castle are nominated for the offices of president and vice president respectively.

=== May 2008 ===
- May 3 – Barack Obama wins the Guam Democratic territorial convention by seven votes.
- May 6 – The North Carolina Democratic primary is won by Barack Obama. The Indiana primary is won by Hillary Clinton. The North Carolina and Indiana Republican primaries are won by John McCain.
- May 12 – Former United States Representative Bob Barr of Georgia officially enters the race for the Libertarian Party nomination.
- May 13 – The West Virginia Democratic primary is won by Hillary Clinton. The Republican primary is won by John McCain. The Nebraska Republican primary is won by John McCain.
- May 14 – Former Democratic candidate and 2004 vice presidential nominee John Edwards endorses Barack Obama.
- May 20 – The Oregon Democratic primary is won by Barack Obama. The Kentucky primary is won by Hillary Clinton. The Oregon and Kentucky Republican primaries are won by John McCain.
- May 23–26 – The 2008 Libertarian National Convention is held at Adam's Mark Hotel in Denver, Colorado. Bob Barr is chosen as the party's presidential nominee and entrepreneur Wayne Allyn Root is chosen as the party's vice presidential nominee.
- May 27 – The Idaho Republican primary is won by John McCain.

=== June 2008 ===
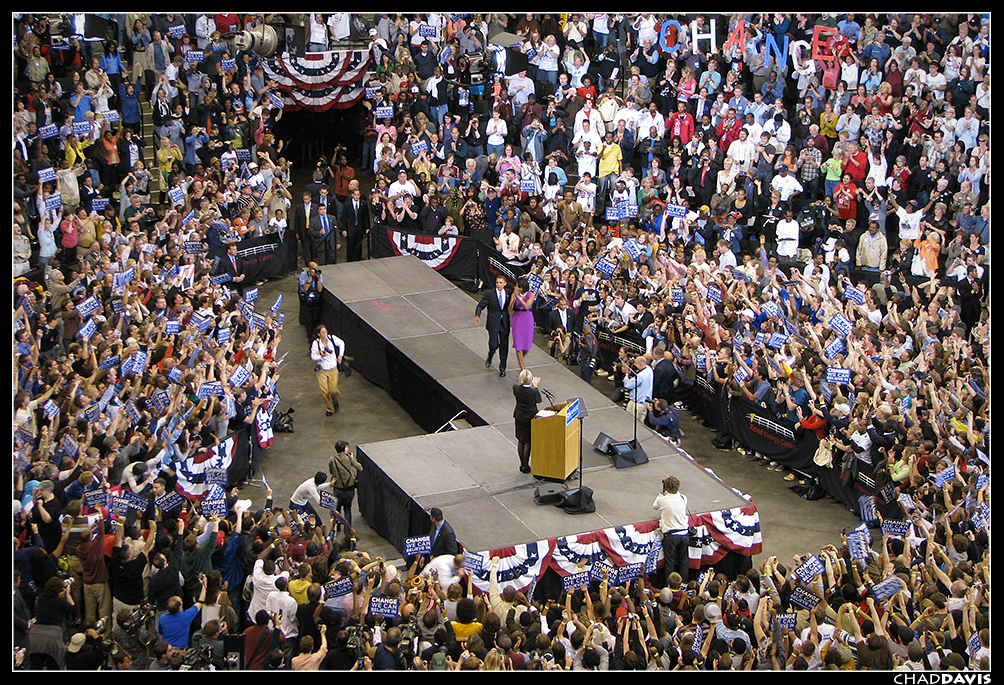
Barack and Michelle Obama onstage after Obama becomes the presumptive Democratic nominee, June 3, 2008

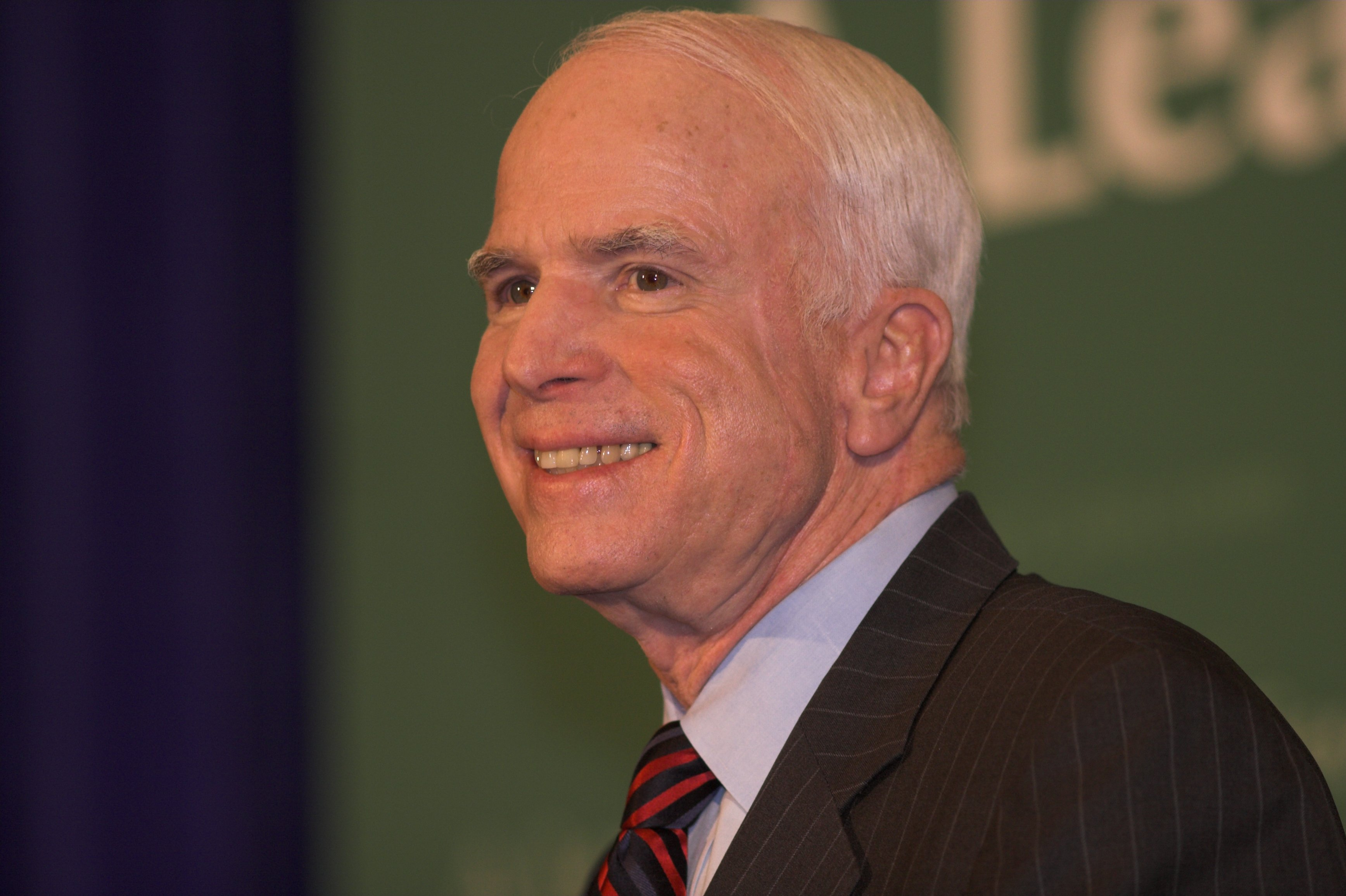
John McCain at a campaign rally in Kenner, Louisiana, June 4, 2008

- June 1 – The Puerto Rico Democratic primary is won by Hillary Clinton.
- June 3 – The South Dakota Democratic primary is won by Hillary Clinton. The Montana primary is won by Barack Obama, who wins enough delegates to become the Democratic presumptive nominee. The South Dakota Republican primary and the New Mexico Republican caucuses are won by John McCain.
- June 4 – John McCain challenges Obama to a series of "town hall" debates starting on June 12.
- June 5 – Barack Obama appoints his vice presidential selection committee.
- June 7 – Hillary Clinton officially concedes the Democratic nomination, and endorses Barack Obama.
- June 12 – Republican candidate Ron Paul officially suspends his campaign, since no Republican primaries remain, and to permit legal transfer of leftover funds to the Campaign for Liberty PAC. Ron Paul delegates to the Republican National Convention were released technically, but were encouraged to stay true.
- June 16 – Former Vice President Al Gore endorses Barack Obama.
- June 27 – Hillary Clinton joins Barack Obama at a rally in Unity, New Hampshire, her first public appearance since ending her presidential campaign.

=== July 2008 ===
- July 3 – John McCain gives political advisor Steve Schmidt "full operational control" of his campaign.
- July 10–13 – The Green Party holds its National Convention in Chicago. Former Congresswoman Cynthia McKinney of Georgia is nominated for president and community organizer Rosa Clemente is nominated for vice president.
- July 23–28 – Barack Obama makes a trip to Europe and the Middle East.

=== August 2008 ===
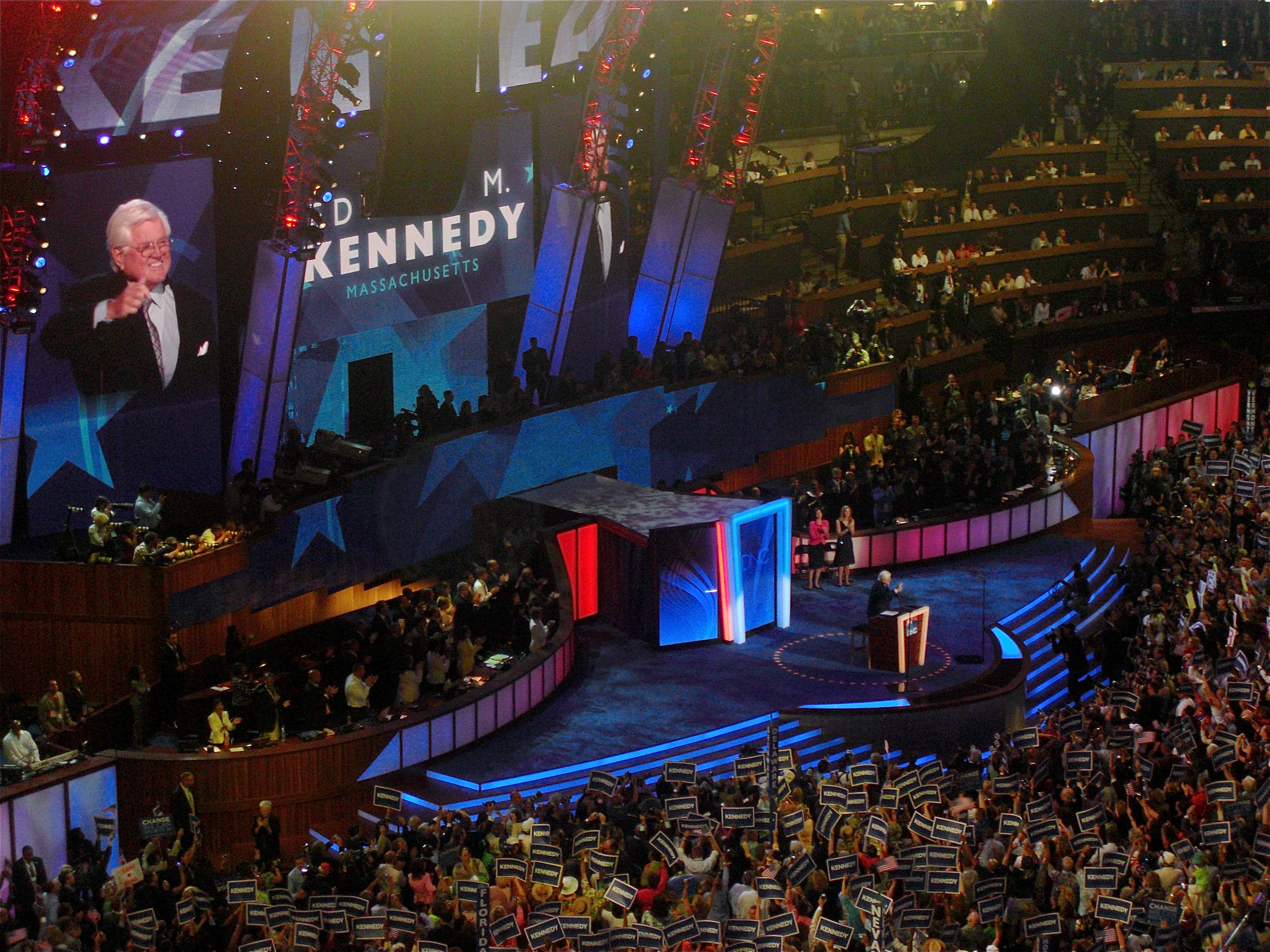
Senator Ted Kennedy of Massachusetts speaks at the Democratic National Convention, August 25, 2008

- August 2 – The Peace and Freedom Party nominates independent candidate Ralph Nader and his running mate Matt Gonzalez for president and vice president respectively.
- August 16 – John McCain and Barack Obama make a joint appearance at the Civil Forum on the Presidency at Saddleback Church in Lake Forest, California, in which they are interviewed by Pastor Rick Warren.
- August 23 – Barack Obama announces his selection of former Democratic presidential candidate and Senator Joe Biden of Delaware as his running mate.
- August 24 – The Democratic National Committee unanimously votes that the delegates to the Democratic National Convention from Florida and Michigan will be fully seated. It had previously stripped both states of their delegates as punishment for moving their primary dates before February 5.
- August 25–28 – The Democratic National Convention convenes in Denver.
- August 27 – Barack Obama is officially nominated for president by the Democratic Party. Joe Biden is nominated for Vice President of the United States, accepting minutes later.
- August 28 – Barack Obama accepts the Democratic Party presidential nomination in a speech delivered at Invesco Field in Denver.
- August 29 – John McCain announces his selection of Alaska Governor Sarah Palin as his running mate.

=== September 2008 ===
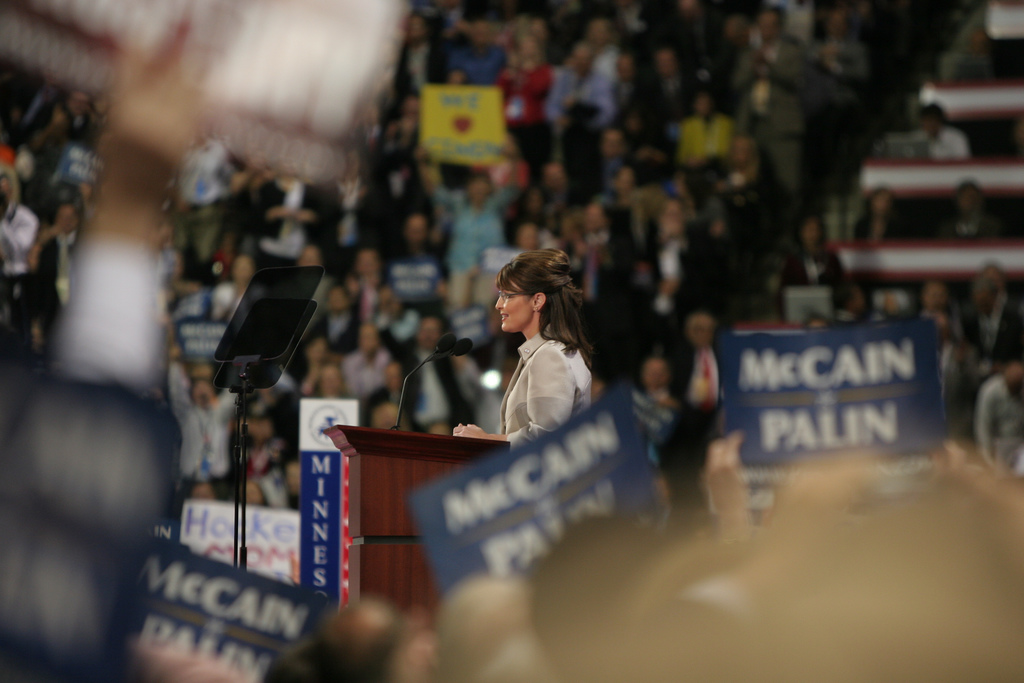
Sarah Palin speaks at the Republican National Convention, September 3, 2008

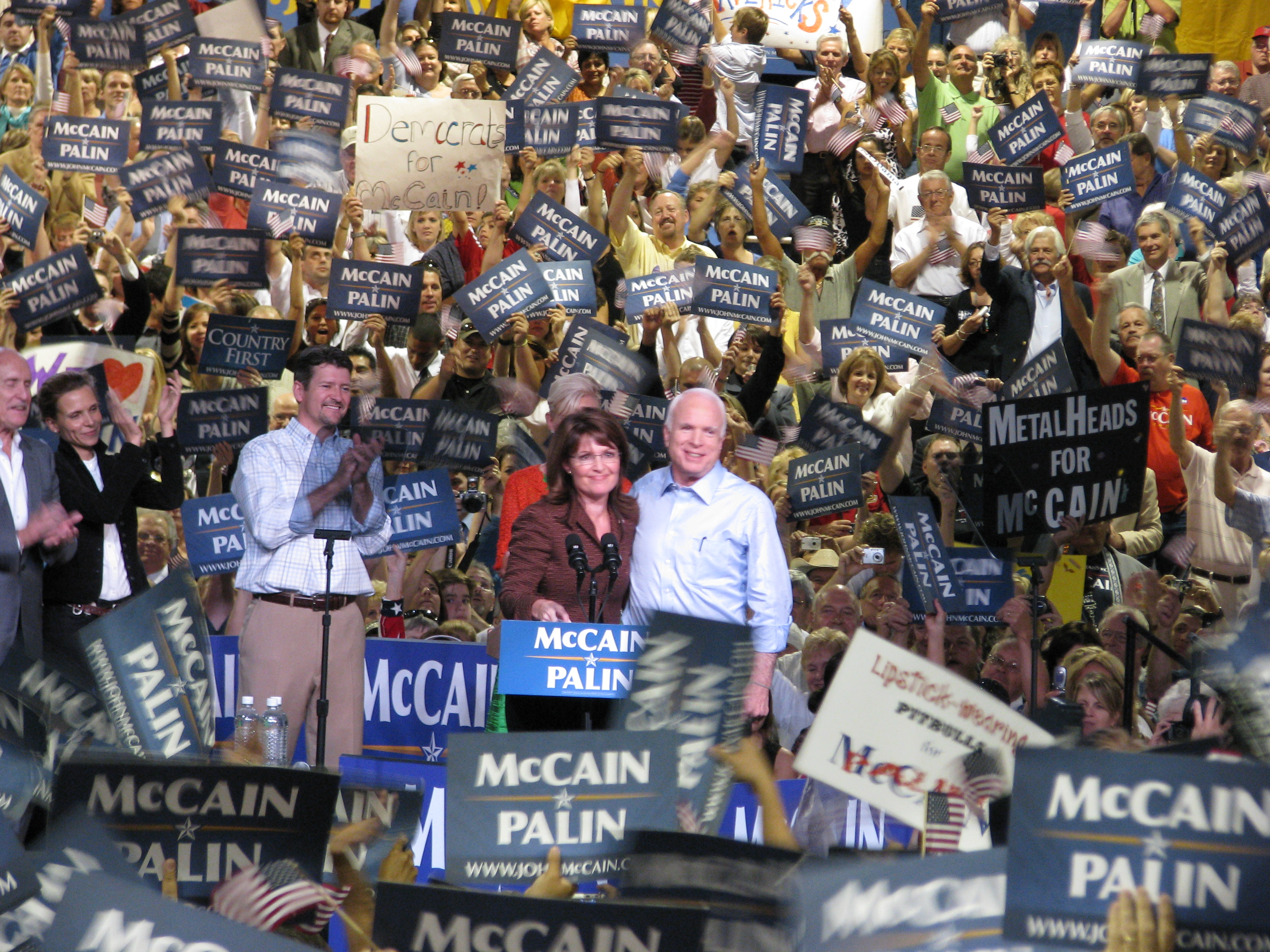
John McCain and Sarah Palin onstage with Todd Palin, Cindy McCain and Robert Duvall in Albuquerque, New Mexico, September 6, 2008

- September 1–4 – 2008 Republican National Convention convenes in Minneapolis–St. Paul, Minnesota.
- September 2 – Ron Paul holds parallel convention in the same city.
- September 3 – John McCain is officially nominated for president by the Republican Party, winning over 98% of the delegates. Ron Paul received 5 to 29 votes, and Mitt Romney received 2 votes.
- September 4 – Sarah Palin is officially nominated for Vice President by the Republican Party. John McCain accepts the Republican Party nomination in a speech delivered at Xcel Energy Center in St. Paul, Minnesota.
- September 10 – Former Republican candidate Ron Paul expresses support for Constitution Party nominee Chuck Baldwin, Green Party nominee Cynthia McKinney and independent candidate Ralph Nader in a joint press conference at the National Press Club. The purpose was to outline shared principles of all: non-interventionism, civil liberties, balanced budgets, and uncorrupt monetary policy. Libertarian Party nominee Bob Barr, who was invited by Paul, held a separate conference down the hall, joining in the support of shared principles, but protesting that Paul ought to endorse the Libertarian nominee (Barr himself) specifically. Barr's protest was cited as a reason for not giving him the endorsement; two weeks later, Paul would instead specifically endorse the Constitution Party nominee.
- September 21 – Early voting begins in some states.
- September 24 – John McCain announces he is suspending his campaign to work on the 2008 financial crisis, and says he may not attend the first presidential debate on September 26. The first segment of Sarah Palin's interviews with Katie Couric airs on CBS News. Ron Paul endorses Chuck Baldwin for president.
- September 25 – Barack Obama and John McCain meet with President George W. Bush and congressional leaders to discuss the 2008 financial crisis.
- September 26 – Barack Obama and John McCain appear at the first presidential debate at the University of Mississippi.

=== October 2008 ===
- October 2 – Joe Biden and Sarah Palin appear at the vice presidential debate at Washington University in St. Louis.
- October 7 – Sarah Palin accuses Barack Obama of "palling around with terrorists" in reference to his alleged links with anti-war activist Bill Ayers. John McCain and Barack Obama appear at the second presidential debate at Belmont University, Tennessee.
- October 15 – John McCain and Barack Obama appear at the third presidential debate at Hofstra University, New York.
- October 16 – Barack Obama and John McCain address the traditional Alfred E. Smith Memorial Foundation Dinner.
- October 19 – Former Secretary of State Colin Powell, a Republican, endorses Barack Obama.
- October 26 – Constitution Party nominee Chuck Baldwin, Green Party nominee Cynthia McKinney and independent candidate Ralph Nader appear at a debate at Columbia University, New York City. It is covered by C-SPAN.
- October 29 – The Obama campaign airs a 30-minute prime-time television advert on several networks, including a live component at the end of the broadcast.
- October 30 – Former Secretary of State Lawrence Eagleburger, a Republican, attacks Sarah Palin's perceived lack of experience in foreign affairs.
- October 31 – Former White House Chief of Staff Ken Duberstein, a Republican, endorses Barack Obama.

=== November 2008 ===
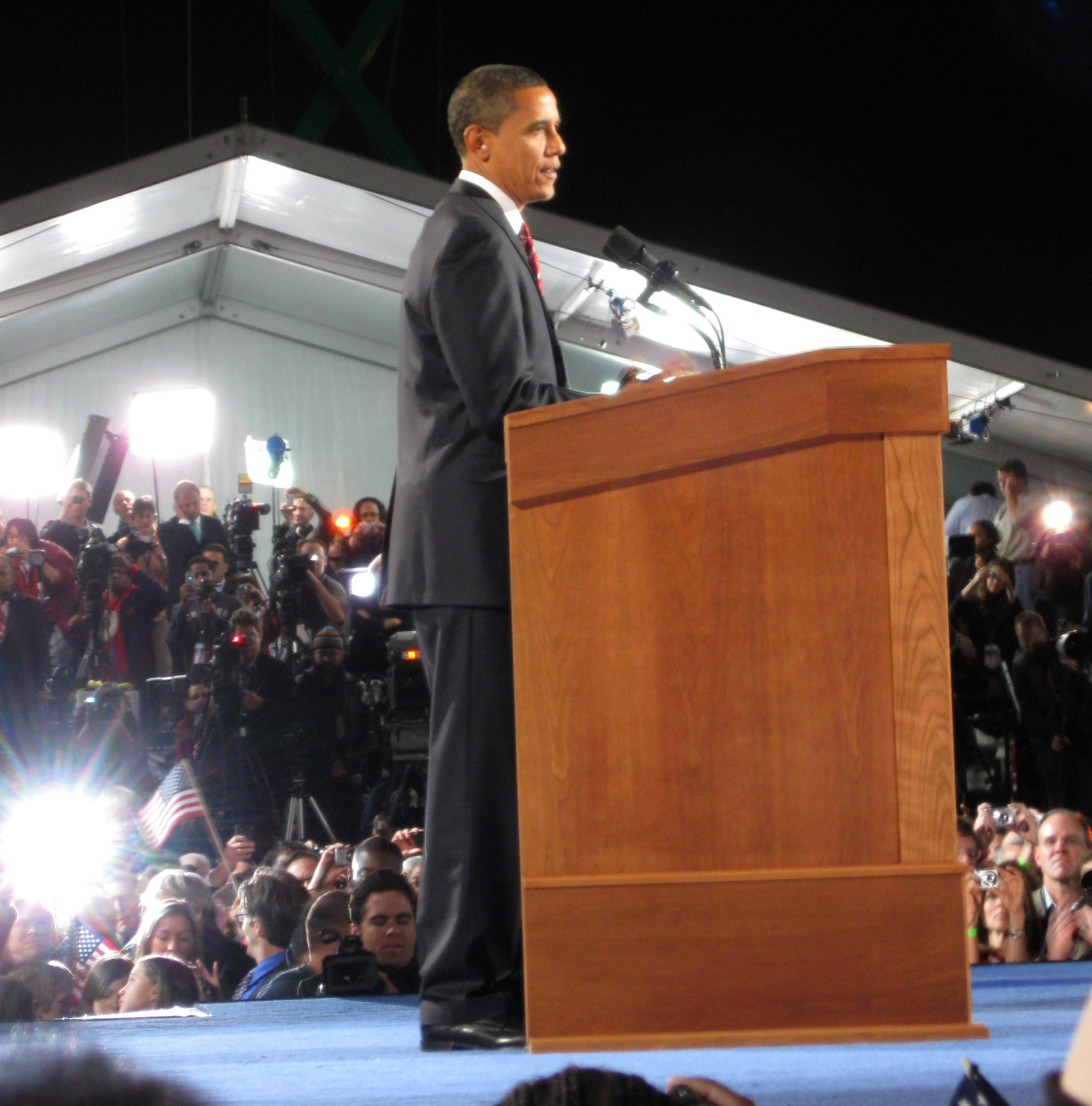
President-elect Barack Obama gives his election victory speech, November 4, 2008.

- November 1 – Republican nominee John McCain appears on Saturday Night Live.
- November 4 – Election Day: Barack Obama and Joe Biden win 52.9% of the popular vote and 365 electoral votes compared to 45.6% and 173 electoral votes for John McCain and Sarah Palin. McCain concedes the election in Phoenix, Arizona and President-elect Obama gives his victory speech in Chicago.
- November 16 – Barack Obama resigns his seat in the United States Senate.

=== December 2008 ===
- December 5 – The Supreme Court of the United States meets to decide whether to rule on President-elect Barack Obama's eligibility to take office.
- December 8 – The Supreme Court declines to rule on President-elect Obama's eligibility to take office.
- December 15 – Each state's presidential electors meet in their respective state capitals and the District of Columbia to officially elect Barack Obama as president and Joe Biden as vice president.

== 2009 ==
=== January ===
- January 8 – Vice President Dick Cheney, in his role as President of the U.S. Senate, opens the certificates of the electoral votes from the various states, which are then counted by two tellers from the House of Representatives and two from the Senate. Cheney then announces the votes for president and vice president. Unlike previous electoral vote counts, there were no faithless electors, leaving the final tally unchanged from election day projections.
- January 15 – Vice President-elect Joe Biden resigns his seat in the United States Senate after 36 years in office.
- January 20 – Barack Obama is inaugurated as the 44th president of the United States and Joe Biden as the 47th vice president in Washington, D.C.
- January 21 – In the White House Map Room, Chief Justice John Roberts administers the presidential oath for a second time to Barack Obama "out of an abundance of caution" as a result of the word "faithfully" being misplaced when the oath was originally administered at the public inauguration ceremony a day earlier.

== Election campaign 2008 candidate participation timeline ==
Candidate announcement and, if applicable, withdrawal dates are as follows:

== See also ==
- Presidential transition of Barack Obama
- 2004 United States presidential election timeline
- 2012 United States presidential election timeline
- 2016 United States presidential election timeline
