= 2008 United States presidential election in West Virginia =

- November 4, 2008
- Turnout: 57.92%

Nominee	John McCain	Barack Obama
Party	Republican	Democratic
Home state	Arizona	Illinois
Running mate	Sarah Palin	Joe Biden
Electoral vote	5	0
Popular vote	397,466	303,857
Percentage	55.60%	42.51%

McCain
40–50%
50–60%
60–70%
70–80%
80–90%
Obama
40–50%
50–60%
60–70%
70–80%
80–90%
90–100%
Tie/No Data
President before election
George W. Bush
Republican
Elected President
Barack Obama
Democratic

The 2008 United States presidential election in West Virginia took place on November 4, 2008, and was part of the 2008 United States presidential election. Voters chose 5 representatives, or electors to the Electoral College, who voted for president and vice president.

West Virginia was won by Republican nominee John McCain by a 13.1% margin of victory. Prior to the election, all 17 news organizations considered this a state McCain would win, or otherwise considered as a safe red state. Despite its past voting record of heavily favoring Democratic presidential nominees, the state had since 2000 been trending more Republican in presidential elections. Obama became the first Democratic presidential nominee since Woodrow Wilson in 1916 to win the nationwide presidential election without carrying West Virginia, and in that election Wilson had managed to win a single electoral vote, making Obama the first Democrat to win without carrying any electoral votes from the state. Obama also became the first Democrat since 1928 to lose Logan County, a strongly unionized coal-dependent county that was the only county in West Virginia to vote for George McGovern in his landslide 1972 loss.

In contrast to West Virginia, Virginia voted for Obama, marking the first time Virginia voted for the Democratic nominee since 1964. Starting in 2008, West Virginia has always voted for the Republican nominee and Virginia has always voted for the Democratic nominee. In 2008, West Virginia was one of five states where Obama underperformed 2004 Democratic presidential nominee John Kerry, the others being Arkansas, Louisiana, Oklahoma, and Tennessee.

As of the 2024 presidential election, this is the last time that the Democratic presidential nominee won any county in West Virginia, including Boone, Braxton, Jefferson, Marion, McDowell, Monongalia and Webster, and the last presidential election in which the Democratic nominee received more than 40% of the vote in West Virginia.

== Primaries ==
- 2008 West Virginia Democratic primary
- 2008 West Virginia Republican caucuses and primary

== Campaign ==
=== Predictions ===
There were 16 news organizations who made state-by-state predictions of the election. Here are their last predictions before election day:

Source	Ranking
D.C. Political Report	Likely R
Cook Political Report	Lean R
The Takeaway	Lean R
Electoral-vote.com	Lean R
Washington Post	Lean R
Politico	Solid R
RealClearPolitics	Lean R
FiveThirtyEight	Lean R
CQ Politics	Lean R
The New York Times	Lean R
CNN	Lean R
NPR	Lean R
MSNBC	Lean R
Fox News	Likely R
Associated Press	Likely R
Rasmussen Reports	Safe R

=== Polling ===
McCain lead in 16 of 17 pre-election polls. The final three polls showed McCain leading by an average of 53% to 41%.

=== Fundraising ===
John McCain raised a total of $291,184 in the state. Barack Obama raised $713,231.

=== Advertising and visits ===
Obama and his interest groups spent $1,437,178. McCain and his interest groups spent $1,920,720. Each ticket visited the state once.

== Analysis ==
More than any other state, West Virginia highlighted Obama's trouble in Appalachian America. It swung heavily to the Democrats during the days of Franklin D. Roosevelt and remained reliably Democratic for most of the next 68 years. During that time, it only voted Republican three times, all in national Republican landslides--1956, 1972 and 1984. It also voted for Democrats (such as Jimmy Carter and Michael Dukakis) who went on to big national defeats. This was largely due to its blue-collar, heavily unionized workers, especially coal miners, who favored Democratic economic policy.

Starting with the campaign of Al Gore, however, the state's voters became more concerned with the national Democratic Party's perceived hostility toward the coal industry, which is a core part of the West Virginia economy. As a result, the state has been trending Republican in national elections. In 2008, neither presidential nominee campaigned heavily in the state.

=== Election results ===
On Election Day, McCain won West Virginia by 13.09 points while losing nationwide. McCain did well throughout the state, losing only a handful of counties. While his margins were best in the more conservative northern part of the state, he also improved significantly in Southern West Virginia. This coal-mining, union-heavy region was one of the most heavily Democratic places in the nation; Logan County, for example, cast 72% of its ballot for Bill Clinton. In 2008, however, John McCain won the county by double digits, becoming the first Republican to win it since Herbert Hoover in 1928.

On the other hand, Barack Obama did make gains in the area between Maryland and Virginia, counties which are a part of the Washington Metropolitan Area. Obama also ran close in Central West Virginia (the counties around the capital Charleston). Despite the recent Republican success nationally, Democrats still dominated at the state and local levels. After the 2008 election, Democrats held the governorship and every other statewide executive office, in addition to both U.S. Senate seats, two out of the state's three U.S. House seats, supermajorities in both chambers of the state legislature.

=== Other elections ===
During the same election, popular incumbent Democratic Governor Joe Manchin III was soundly reelected to a second term with 69.79% of the vote over Republican Russ Weeks, who took in 25.75%, while Jesse Johnson of the Mountain Party received 4.46%. Incumbent Democratic U.S. Senator Jay Rockefeller IV won a fifth term with 63.71% of the vote over Republican Jay Wolfe, who took in 36.27%. At the state level, Democrats retained majorities in both state legislative chambers, picking up three seats in the State Senate while losing one seat in the House of Delegates.

== Results ==
2008 United States presidential election in West Virginia
Party	Candidate	Running mate	Popular vote		Electoral vote		Swing
Party	Candidate	Running mate	Count	%	Count	%	Swing
Republican	John McCain of Arizona	Sarah Palin of Alaska	397,466	55.60%	5	100.00%	▼0.48%
Democratic	Barack Obama of Illinois	Joe Biden of Delaware	303,857	42.51%	0	0.00%	▼0.71%
Independent	Ralph Nader of Connecticut	Matt Gonzalez of California	7,219	1.01%	0	0.00%	▲0.47%
Constitution	Chuck Baldwin of Florida	Darrell Castle of Tennessee	2,465	0.34%	0	0.00%	▲0.34%
Mountain	Cynthia McKinney of Georgia	Rosa Clemente of North Carolina	2,355	0.33%	0	0.00%	▲0.33%
Write-in	Various candidates		1,761	0.25%	0	0.00%	▲0.24%
Total			713,451	100.00%	5	100.00%	

=== By county ===
County	John McCain Republican		Barack Obama Democratic		Various candidates Other parties		Margin		Total
County	#	%	#	%	#	%	#	%	Total
Barbour	3,685	59.13%	2,419	38.82%	128	2.06%	1,266	20.31%	6,232
Berkeley	20,841	55.72%	15,994	42.76%	565	1.51%	4,847	12.96%	37,400
Boone	3,632	43.39%	4,529	54.11%	209	2.50%	-897	-10.72%	8,370
Braxton	2,629	48.55%	2,704	49.94%	82	1.52%	-75	-1.39%	5,415
Brooke	4,961	50.33%	4,717	47.85%	179	1.81%	244	2.48%	9,857
Cabell	18,793	54.11%	15,292	44.03%	647	1.86%	3,501	10.08%	34,732
Calhoun	1,366	56.24%	993	40.88%	70	2.88%	373	15.36%	2,429
Clay	1,755	53.75%	1,421	43.52%	89	2.73%	334	10.23%	3,265
Doddridge	2,218	73.49%	735	24.35%	65	2.16%	1,483	49.14%	3,018
Fayette	7,658	50.40%	7,242	47.66%	294	1.94%	416	2.74%	15,194
Gilmer	1,445	57.32%	1,004	39.83%	72	2.85%	441	17.49%	2,521
Grant	3,166	75.06%	997	23.64%	55	1.30%	2,169	51.42%	4,218
Greenbrier	7,567	55.10%	5,881	42.83%	284	2.07%	1,686	12.27%	13,732
Hampshire	5,222	62.56%	2,983	35.74%	142	1.70%	2,239	26.82%	8,347
Hancock	7,518	56.87%	5,504	41.63%	198	1.50%	2,014	15.24%	13,220
Hardy	3,376	62.44%	1,901	35.16%	130	2.40%	1,475	27.28%	5,407
Harrison	17,824	55.56%	13,582	42.34%	672	2.10%	4,242	13.22%	32,078
Jackson	7,148	58.42%	4,861	39.73%	227	1.85%	2,287	18.69%	12,236
Jefferson	10,600	46.78%	11,687	51.58%	372	1.64%	-1,087	-4.80%	22,659
Kanawha	40,952	49.41%	40,594	48.98%	1,341	1.61%	358	0.43%	82,887
Lewis	4,335	65.60%	2,109	31.92%	164	2.48%	2,226	33.68%	6,608
Lincoln	3,637	53.21%	3,029	44.32%	169	2.47%	608	8.89%	6,835
Logan	7,326	54.17%	5,873	43.43%	325	2.40%	1,453	10.74%	13,524
Marion	11,501	48.45%	11,618	48.94%	621	2.61%	-117	-0.49%	23,740
Marshall	7,759	55.42%	5,996	42.83%	246	1.75%	1,763	12.59%	14,001
Mason	5,853	55.20%	4,484	42.29%	266	2.51%	1,369	12.91%	10,603
McDowell	2,882	44.82%	3,430	53.34%	118	1.84%	-548	-8.52%	6,430
Mercer	13,246	62.81%	7,450	35.33%	393	1.86%	5,796	27.48%	21,089
Mineral	7,616	65.96%	3,750	32.48%	181	1.56%	3,866	33.48%	11,547
Mingo	4,587	55.01%	3,582	42.96%	169	2.03%	1,005	12.05%	8,338
Monongalia	15,775	46.99%	17,060	50.82%	734	2.19%	-1,285	-3.83%	33,569
Monroe	3,397	60.93%	2,014	36.13%	164	2.94%	1,383	24.80%	5,575
Morgan	4,428	60.86%	2,721	37.40%	127	1.74%	1,707	23.46%	7,276
Nicholas	4,804	51.32%	4,357	46.54%	200	2.14%	447	4.78%	9,361
Ohio	10,694	54.73%	8,593	43.98%	253	1.29%	2,101	10.75%	19,540
Pendleton	2,035	59.94%	1,310	38.59%	50	1.47%	725	21.35%	3,395
Pleasants	1,772	59.56%	1,142	38.39%	61	2.05%	630	21.17%	2,975
Pocahontas	2,011	55.22%	1,548	42.50%	83	2.28%	463	12.72%	3,642
Preston	7,325	62.10%	4,205	35.65%	266	2.25%	3,120	26.45%	11,796
Putnam	15,162	60.92%	9,334	37.51%	391	1.57%	5,828	23.41%	24,887
Raleigh	17,548	62.10%	10,237	36.23%	474	1.67%	7,311	25.87%	28,259
Randolph	6,060	55.94%	4,539	41.90%	234	2.16%	1,521	14.04%	10,833
Ritchie	2,781	72.31%	998	25.95%	67	1.74%	1,783	46.36%	3,846
Roane	2,943	52.78%	2,511	45.03%	122	2.19%	432	7.75%	5,576
Summers	2,891	54.38%	2,290	43.08%	135	2.54%	601	11.30%	5,316
Taylor	3,605	58.12%	2,462	39.69%	136	2.19%	1,143	18.43%	6,203
Tucker	2,123	60.54%	1,288	36.73%	96	2.73%	835	23.81%	3,507
Tyler	2,415	64.55%	1,241	33.17%	85	2.28%	1,174	31.38%	3,741
Upshur	5,911	65.89%	2,925	32.61%	135	1.50%	2,986	33.28%	8,971
Wayne	8,947	57.98%	6,137	39.77%	346	2.25%	2,810	18.21%	15,430
Webster	1,386	45.34%	1,552	50.77%	119	3.89%	-166	-5.43%	3,057
Wetzel	3,342	51.78%	2,942	45.58%	170	2.62%	400	6.20%	6,454
Wirt	1,496	64.32%	782	33.62%	48	2.06%	714	30.70%	2,326
Wood	22,896	63.38%	12,573	34.80%	657	1.82%	10,323	28.58%	36,126
Wyoming	4,621	61.37%	2,735	36.32%	174	2.31%	1,886	25.05%	7,530
Totals	397,466	55.58%	303,857	42.49%	13,800	1.93%	93,609	13.09%	715,123

Counties that flipped from Democratic to Republican

- Brooke (largest borough: Wellsburg)
- Fayette (largest city: Fayetteville)
- Logan (largest borough: Logan)
- Mingo (largest borough: Williamson)

Counties that flipped from Republican to Democratic

- Jefferson (largest borough: Charles Town)
- Monongalia (largest borough: Morgantown)

=== By congressional district ===
McCain swept all three of the state's three congressional districts, including the two districts held by Democrats.

District	McCain	Obama	Representative
1st	56.77%	41.51%	Alan Mollohan
2nd	54.63%	43.77%	Shelley Moore Capito
3rd	55.76%	42.29%	Nick Rahall

== Electors ==
Technically the voters of West Virginia cast their ballots for electors: representatives to the Electoral College. West Virginia is allocated 5 electors because it has 3 congressional districts and 2 senators. All candidates who appear on the ballot or qualify to receive write-in votes must submit a list of 5 electors, who pledge to vote for their candidate and their running mate. Whoever wins the majority of votes in the state is awarded all 5 electoral votes. Their chosen electors then vote for president and vice president. Although electors are pledged to their candidate and running mate, they are not obligated to vote for them. An elector who votes for someone other than their candidate is known as a faithless elector.

The electors of each state and the District of Columbia met on December 15, 2008, to cast their votes for president and vice president. The Electoral College itself never meets as one body. Instead the electors from each state and the District of Columbia met in their respective capitols.

All 5 were pledged to John McCain and Sarah Palin:

1. Robert Fish
2. Zane Lawhorn
3. Catherine Sue McKinney
4. Marti Riggall
5. Theresa Waxman
