= 2008 American Samoa Democratic presidential caucuses =

- February 5, 2008

Candidate	Hillary Clinton	Barack Obama
Home state	New York	Illinois
Delegate count	2	1
Popular vote	163	121
Percentage	57.19%	42.46%

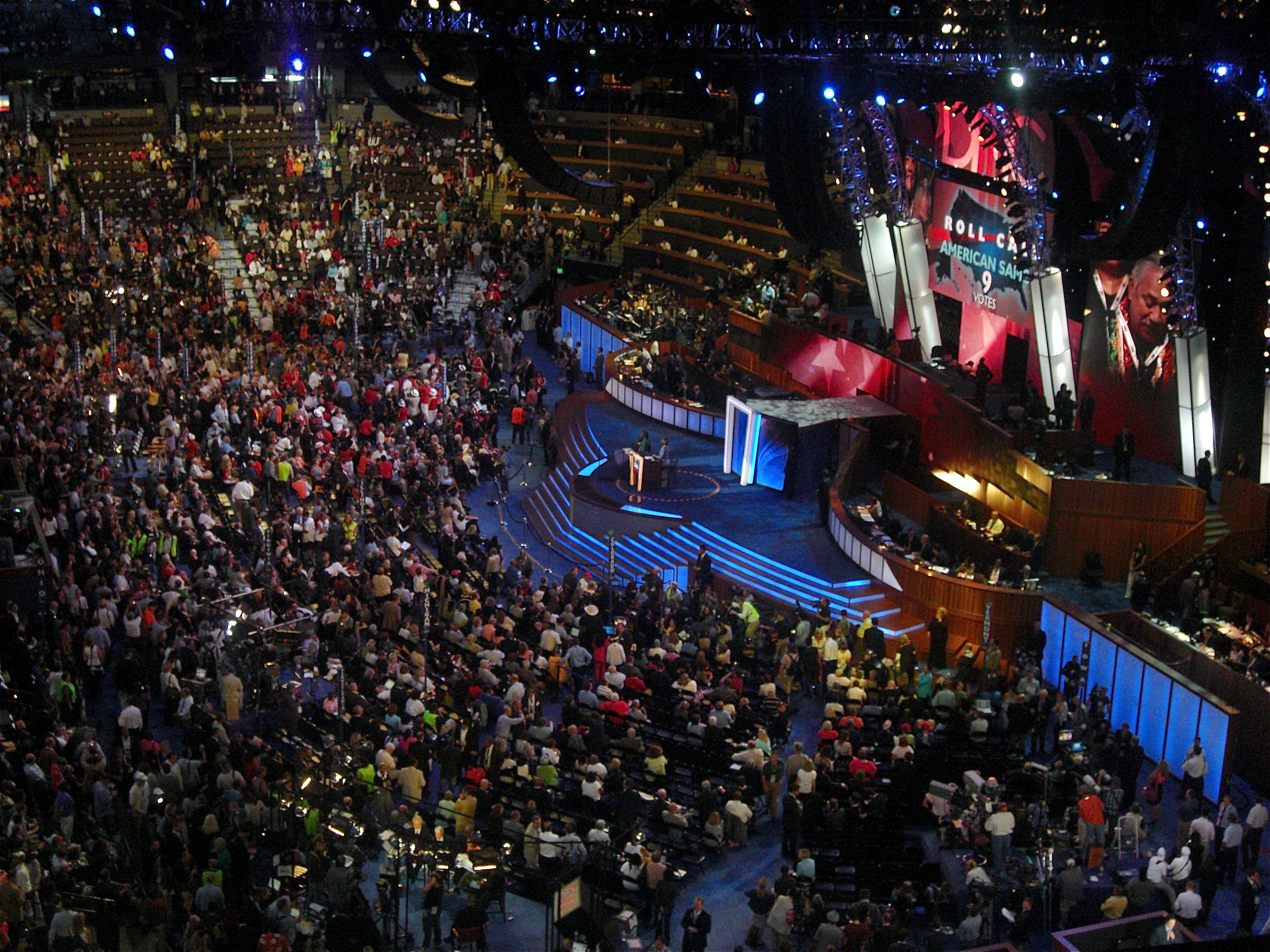
Delegate to the United States House of Representatives from American Samoa's at-large congressional district and Democratic convention superdelegate Eni Faleomavaega announces the distribution of American Samoa's delegate votes as part of the roll call of the states during the third day of the 2008 Democratic National Convention in Denver, Colorado.

The 2008 American Samoa Democratic presidential caucuses took place on February 5, 2008, also known as Super Tuesday. Caucusing began at 11:00 am local time. The early time ensured that results would be reported that evening in the mainland United States. Hillary Clinton won the caucus, the smallest of Super Tuesday's nominating contests.

The caucus drew a record turnout for the territory. A record-setting 285 caucus goers, who voted for their candidates at a hotel in the capital, Pago Pago, turned out for the caucus. The caucus selected six pledged delegates to the 2008 Democratic National Convention; however, each delegate received only half a vote, so the caucus essentially determined the allocation of three delegate votes. Since the pledged delegates were awarded proportionally, Clinton secured 2 delegates, with the third going to her opponent Barack Obama.

== Results ==
American Samoa Democratic presidential caucus, 2008
Candidate	Votes	Percentage	National delegates
Hillary Clinton	163	57.19%	2
Barack Obama	121	42.45%	1
Mike Gravel	1	0.35%	0
Totals	285	100.00%	3

American Samoa also sent 6 unpledged superdelegates to the national convention; 4 endorsed Senator Clinton while 2 endorsed Senator Obama.

== See also ==
- American Samoa Republican caucuses, 2008
