= 2008 American Samoa Republican presidential caucuses =

Presidential Caucuses of the Republican Party in 2008

- February 23, 2008
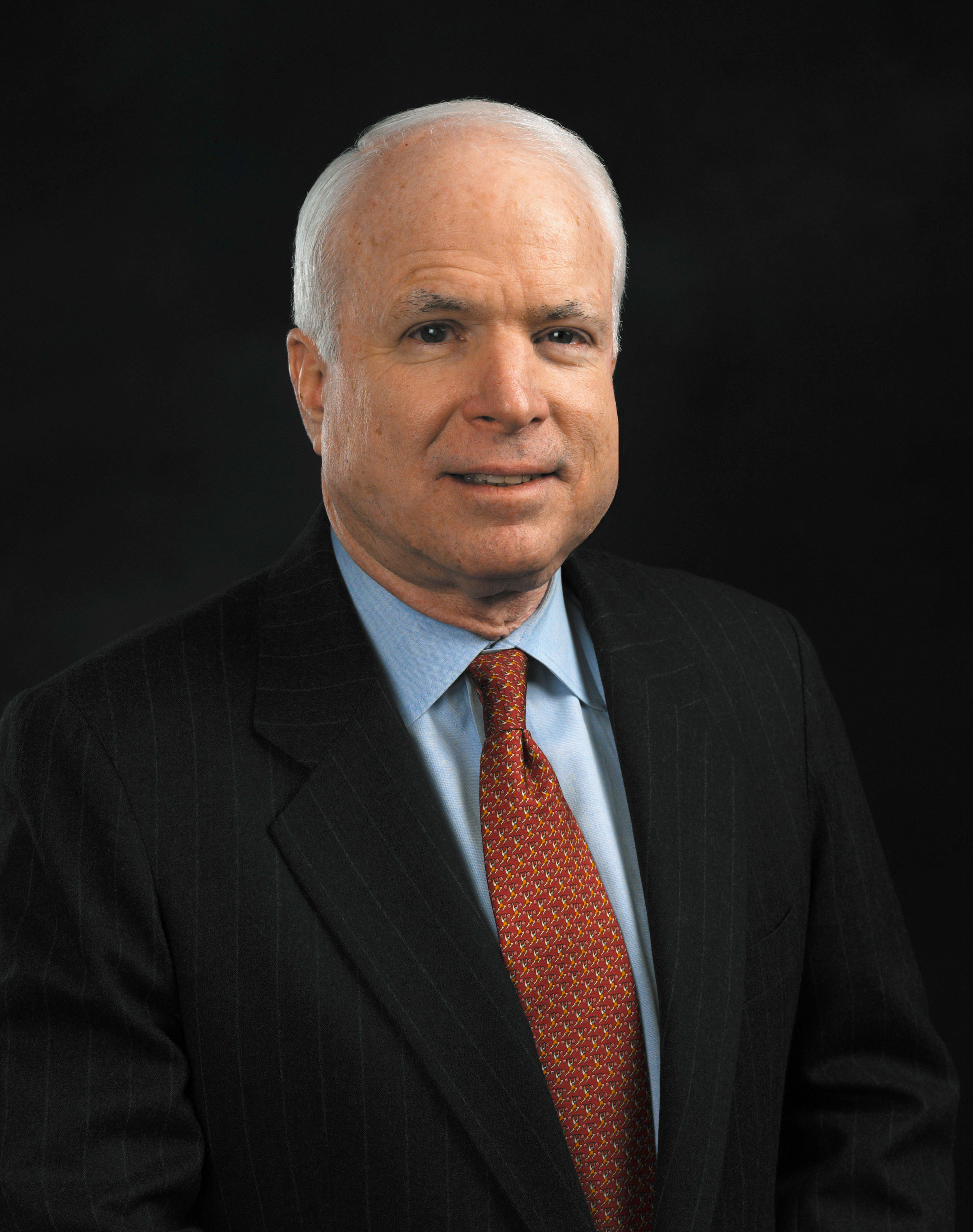

Candidate	John McCain	Mike Huckabee
Home state	Arizona	Arkansas
Delegate count	9	0
Percentage	62%	38%

The 2008 American Samoa Republican presidential caucuses took place on February 23, 2008. John McCain won all 6 pledged (and the support of 3 unpledged delegates) at the territory's convention. McCain "campaigned" in the territory by recording an audio message to the delegates and sending it to the caucus via the Internet.

== Results ==
Candidate	Votes	Percentage	Delegates
John McCain	Unknown	62%	9
Mike Huckabee	Unknown	38%	0
Ron Paul	0	0%	0
Total	Unknown	N/A%	9

== See also ==
- American Samoa Democratic caucuses, 2008
- Republican Party (United States) presidential primaries, 2008
