= 2008 West Virginia Republican presidential caucuses and primary =

- February 5 (caucuses); May 13, 2008 (primary)

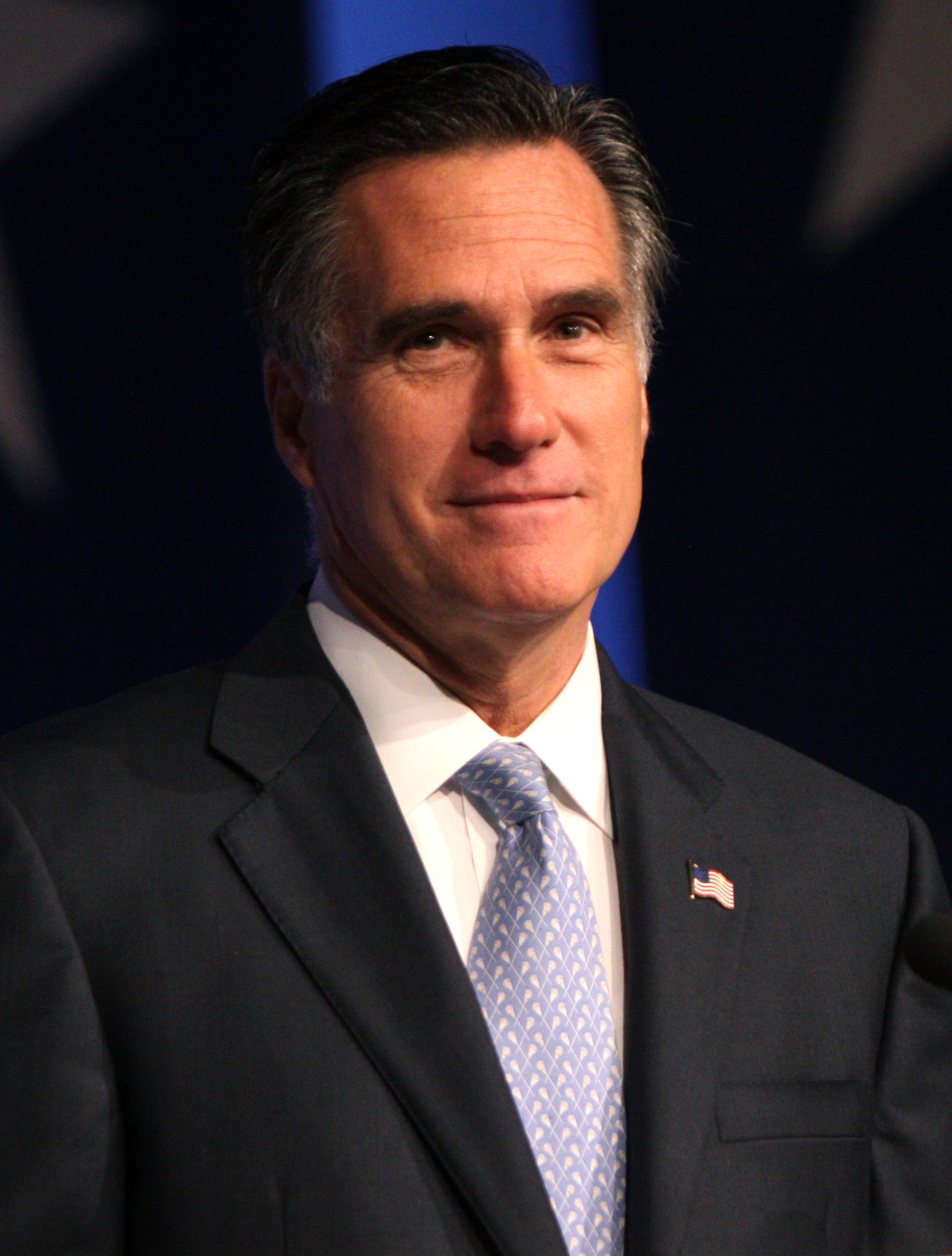

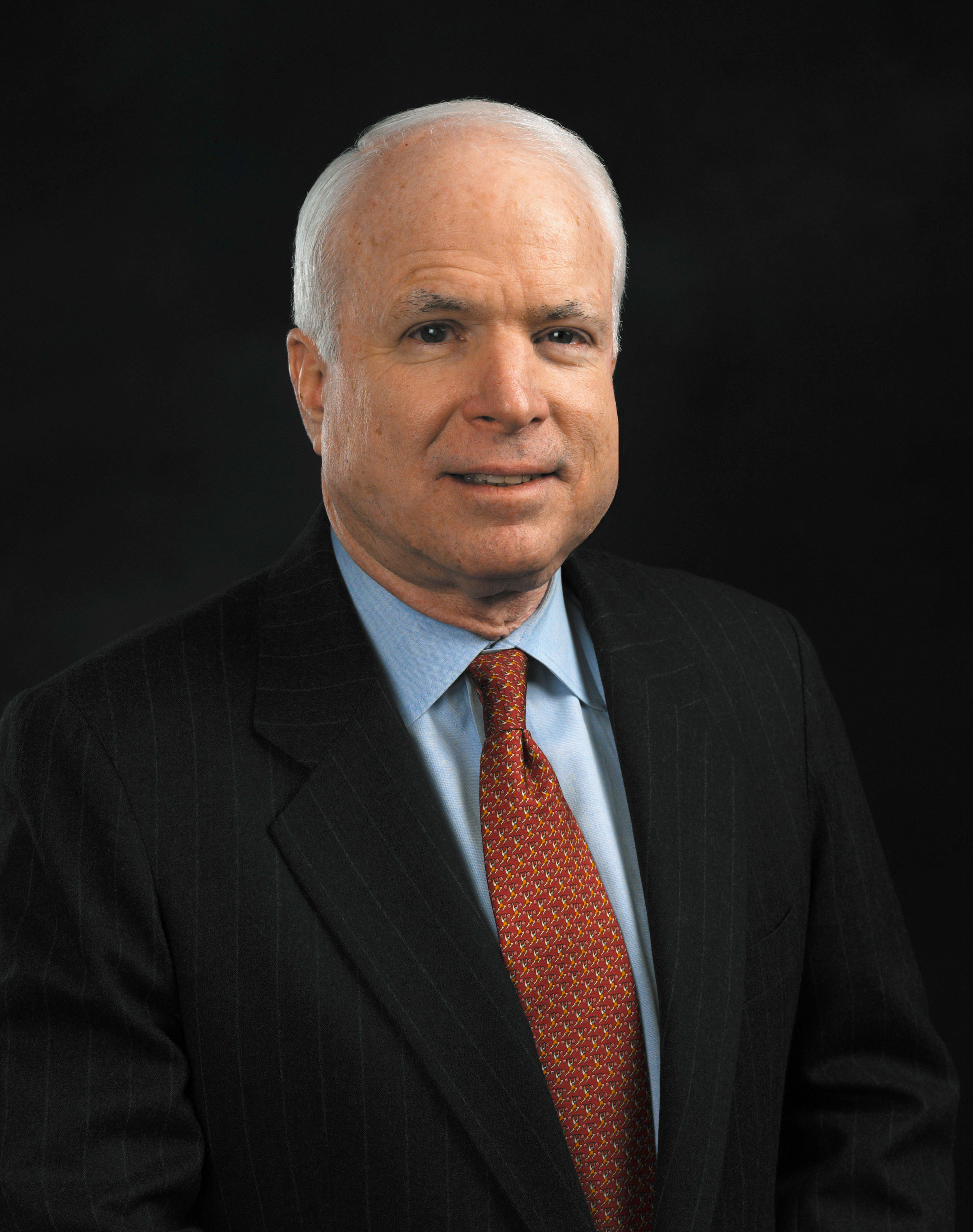

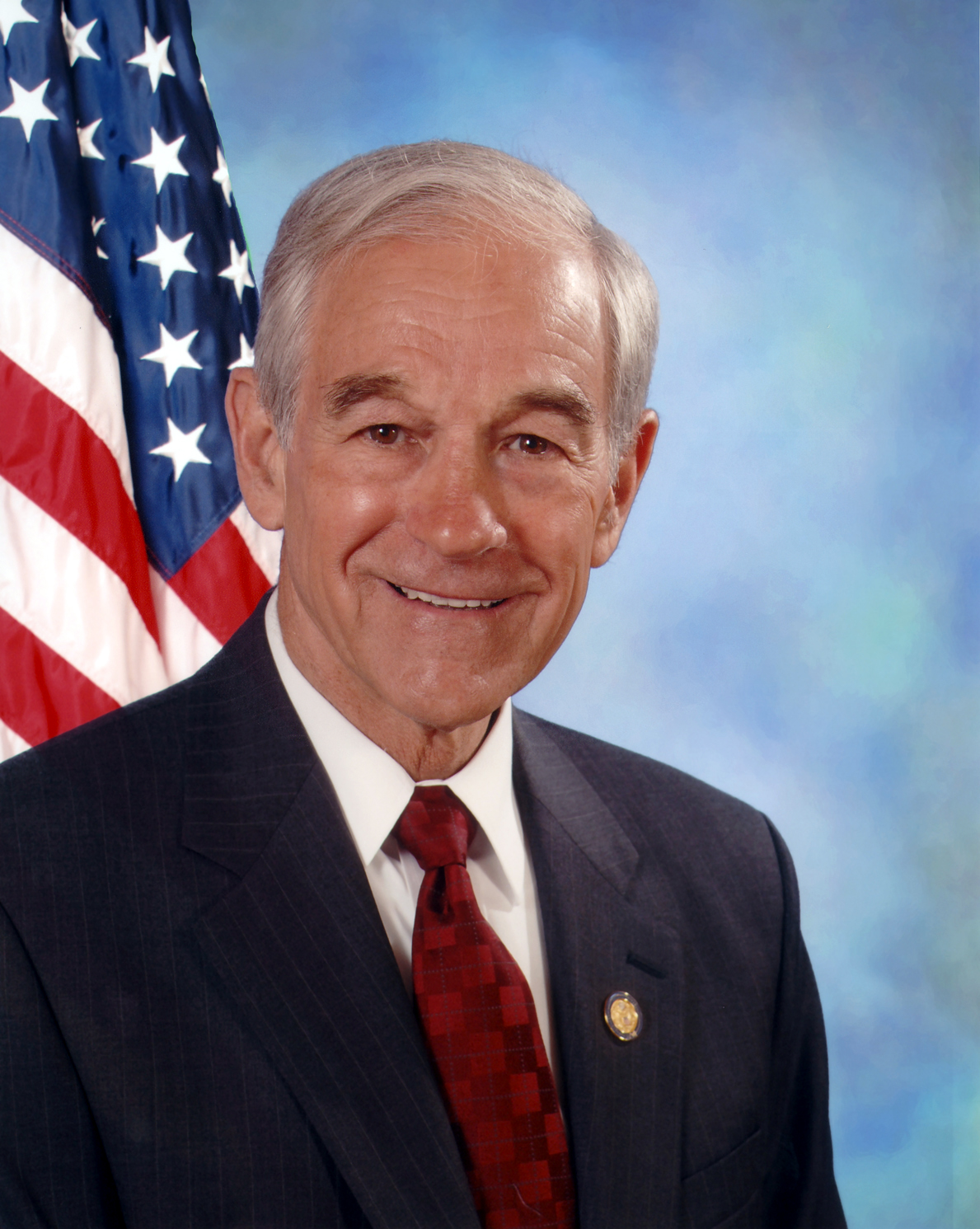
Candidate	Mike Huckabee	Mitt Romney
Party	Republican	Republican
Home state	Arkansas	Massachusetts
Delegate count	18 (15) / 0	0/0
Popular vote	567/12,175	52.1%/5,188
Percentage	51.55%/10.3%	47.36%/4.4%
Candidate	John McCain	Ron Paul
Party	Republican	Republican
Home state	Arizona	Texas
Delegate count	0/9	0 (3) / 0
Popular vote	12%/89,683	0/5,914
Percentage	1.09%/76.0%	0%/5.0%

The 2008 West Virginia Republican presidential caucuses took place on February 5, 2008, to select 18 delegates to the 2008 Republican National Convention. An additional nine delegates were selected in a primary election on May 13, 2008, for a total of 27 delegates to the national convention. Mike Huckabee won the caucus, and John McCain later won the primary.

Romney entered the caucus with the most pledged convention-goers, but delegates for McCain defected to Huckabee. In the first round of caucusing, the results were Romney 464, Huckabee 375, McCain 176, Paul 118, Giuliani 0. Since no candidate had a majority, Giuliani dropped out and the delegates took a second vote. At this second vote, most Paul and McCain supporters, reportedly acting on commands from their coordinators, shifted to Huckabee, ensuring him the majority. As a result of a deal with Huckabee's camp, Paul's delegates swung to Huckabee in exchange for 3 of the State's 18 national delegates.

The West Virginia caucus was the first of the 21 "Super Tuesday" contests to be counted, with the results being reported in the mid-afternoon. Huckabee's win over the favored Romney was considered a major loss of momentum for Romney's campaign, while it revitalized Mike Huckabee's hopes for the nomination.

In the primary election, three delegates were awarded for each of West Virginia's three congressional districts. The winner in each district was awarded all three of that district's delegates. McCain, the presumptive nominee, easily won all three districts.

== Results ==
=== February 5 Caucus ===
100% of precincts reporting
Candidate	Votes	Percentage	Delegates
Mike Huckabee	567	51.55%	18(15)
Mitt Romney	521	47.36%	0
John McCain	12	1.09%	0
Ron Paul	0	0%	0(3)
Total	1,100	100%	18

- As a result of the deal between Huckabee and Paul's delegates, 3 of the State's 18 delegates went to Ron Paul, although the election was technically a "winner-take-all."

=== May 13 primary ===
Primary results by county John McCain

100% of precincts reporting
Candidate	Votes	Percentage	Delegates
John McCain	89,683	76.0%	9
Mike Huckabee*	12,175	10.3%	0
Ron Paul	5,914	5.0%	0
Mitt Romney*	5,188	4.4%	0
Rudolph Giuliani*	2,831	2.4%	0
Alan Keyes	1,427	1.2%	0
Others	727	0.6%	0
Total	117,945	100%	9

*Candidate suspended campaign prior to this primary

== See also ==
- Republican Party (United States) presidential primaries, 2008
- West Virginia Democratic primary, 2008
