= 2008 West Virginia Democratic presidential primary =

- May 13, 2008

39 Democratic National Convention delegates (28 pledged, 11 unpledged)

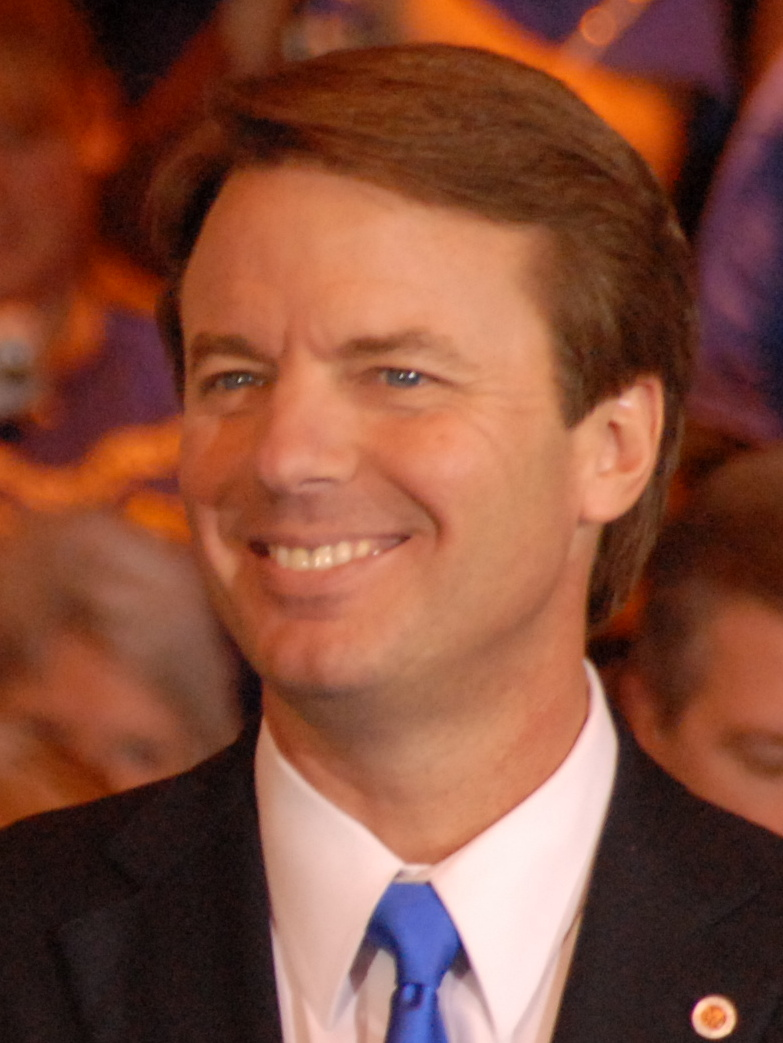
Candidate	Hillary Clinton	Barack Obama	John Edwards (withdrawn)
Home state	New York	Illinois	North Carolina
Delegate count	20	8	0
Popular vote	240,890	92,736	26,284
Percentage	66.93%	25.77%	7.30%
- County results Clinton: 40–50% 50–60% 60–70% 70–80% 80–90%

The 2008 West Virginia Democratic presidential primary took place on May 13, 2008 with polls closing at 7:30 p.m. EST. It was open to Democrats and Independents. The primary determined 28 delegates to the 2008 Democratic National Convention, who were awarded on a proportional basis. West Virginia's Democratic delegation also included 11 unpledged "superdelegates". The primary came late in the nomination race. Hillary Clinton won by a very wide margin, but her opponent Barack Obama maintained a substantial lead in the overall number of pledged delegate votes. Clinton received more votes in this primary than in the 2016 United States presidential election in West Virginia as the Democratic nominee.

== Polls ==
As of May 4, 2008, opinion polling showed Sen. Hillary Clinton holding a 56% to 27% lead over Sen. Barack Obama, with 17% undecided.

Some of West Virginia's superdelegates also endorsed a candidate prior to the primary. By February 20, more than a month before the election, three superdelegates had announced support for Sen. Hillary Clinton (DNC Members Marie Prezioso, Pat Maroney, and Belinda Biafore), while three had endorsed Sen. Barack Obama (Rep. Nick Rahall, Sen. Jay Rockefeller, and Sen. Robert C. Byrd).

== Results ==
Primary date: May 13, 2008

National pledged delegates determined: 28

West Virginia Democratic presidential primary, 2008
Party	Candidate	Votes	Percentage	Delegates
Democratic	Hillary Clinton	240,890	66.93%	20
Democratic	Barack Obama	92,736	25.77%	8
Democratic	John Edwards (withdrawn)	26,284	7.3%	0
Totals		359,910	100.00%	28

== See also ==
- Democratic Party (United States) presidential primaries, 2008
- West Virginia Republican caucuses, 2008
