= Results of the 2008 Republican Party presidential primaries =

This article contains the results of the 2008 Republican presidential primaries and caucuses.

The 2008 Republican primaries were the selection processes by which the Republican Party selected delegates to attend the 2008 Republican National Convention. The series of primaries, caucuses, and state conventions culminated in the National Convention which was held in Saint Paul, Minnesota, September 1–4, 2008, where the delegates voted on and selected a candidate. A simple majority of delegate votes in September (1,191 out of 2,380) was required to become the party's nominee; estimates based on delegate pledges had John McCain surpassing this total after the March 4 primaries in Ohio, Rhode Island, Texas, and Vermont.

== Candidates ==
The only candidate with a national campaign at the end of the primary season was John McCain. Withdrawn candidates who had national campaigns were Ron Paul, Mike Huckabee, Sam Brownback, John H. Cox, Jim Gilmore, Rudy Giuliani, Duncan Hunter, Mitt Romney, Tom Tancredo, Fred Thompson, and Tommy Thompson.

== Overview of results ==
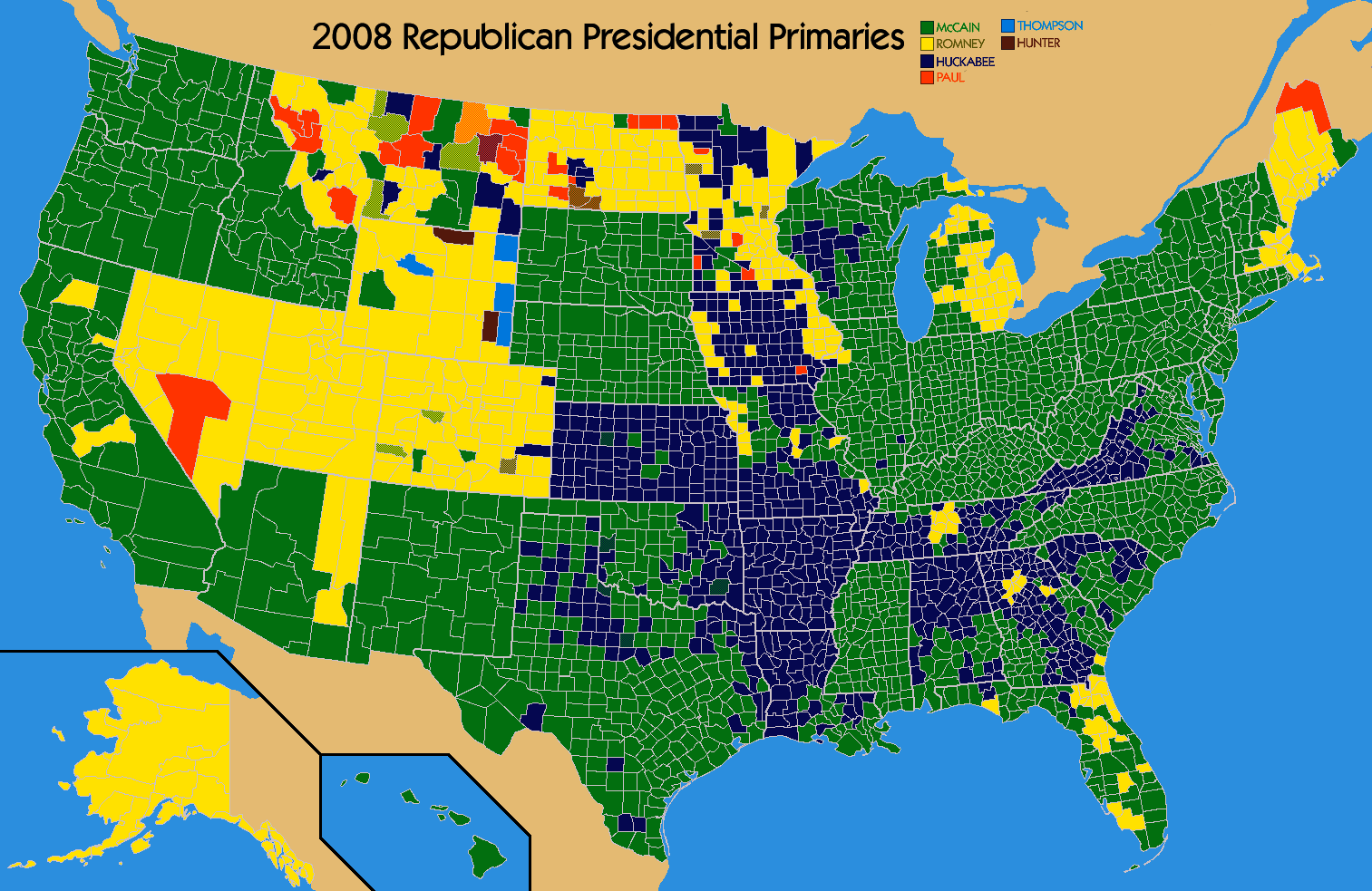
2008 Republican primary results (popular vote) by county.

=== Convention floor vote ===
	John McCain	Ron Paul	Mitt Romney	Not voting	Total delegates
Convention Floor Vote	2,343 (98.45%)	21 (0.88%)	2 (0.08%)	14 (0.59%)	2,380 (100.00%)

=== Delegate count estimates ===
Several media sources estimated the number of delegates supporting each candidate using the popular vote results of primary contests and statements from party officials and individual delegates. Delegates could be "pledged" and obligated by state party rules to vote for a specific candidate on the first ballot of the convention, or "unpledged" and able to vote for any candidate. Since several states selected delegates months after their primary or caucus date, many delegate counts for individual states were estimated based on the popular vote results in the contest.

	John McCain	Ron Paul	Alan Keyes	Mike Huckabee	Mitt Romney	Rudy Giuliani	Fred Thompson	Duncan Hunter	Uncommitted or Unprojected	Total delegates
ABC	1,267 (53.24%)	14 (0.59%)	0 (0.00%)	272 (11.43%)	273 (11.47%)	1 (0.04%)	5 (0.21%)	1 (0.04%)	547 (22.98%)	2,380 (100.00%)
CNN	1,575 (66.18%)	35 (1.47%)	- (0.00%)	278 (11.68%)	271 (11.39%)	0 (0.00%)	0 (0.00%)	0 (0.00%)	221 (9.29%)	2,380 (100.00%)
RealClearPolitics	1,563 (65.67%)	29 (1.22%)	- (0.00%)	282 (11.85%)	272 (11.43%)	- (0.00%)	- (0.00%)	- (0.00%)	234 (9.83%)	2,380 (100.00%)
The Green Papers	1,568 (65.88%)	42 (1.76%)	2 (0.08%)	257 (10.80%)	158 (6.64%)	0 (0.00%)	8 (0.34%)	1 (0.04%)	344 (14.45%)	2,380 (100.00%)
The New York Times	1,401 (58.87%)	20 (0.84%)	2 (0.08%)	240 (10.08%)	148 (6.22%)	0 (0.00%)	0 (0.00%)	0 (0.00%)	717 (30.13%)	2,380 (100.00%)

=== Popular vote ===
	John McCain	Ron Paul	Alan Keyes	Mike Huckabee	Mitt Romney	Rudy Giuliani	Fred Thompson	Duncan Hunter	Uncommitted and minor candidates	Total
Popular votes	9,615,153 (46.65%)	1,145,138 (5.56%)	56,280 (0.27%)	4,147,961 (20.12%)	4,567,127 (22.16%)	592,391 (2.87%)	287,581 (1.40%)	37,880 (0.18%)	163,694 (0.79%)	20,613,585
Withdrawal date	Presumptive nominee	June 12, 2008	April 15, 2008	March 4, 2008	February 7, 2008	January 30, 2008	January 22, 2008	January 19, 2008		

=== Primaries and caucuses ===
Dates	Contest	John McCain	Ron Paul	Alan Keyes	Mike Huckabee	Mitt Romney	Rudy Giuliani	Fred Thompson	Duncan Hunter	Total delegates, pledged (unpledged/total), and votes^{[A]}
Jan. 3, 2008	Iowa^{[B]} Nonbinding precinct caucuses	13% (0 delegates) (15,536 votes)	10% (0 delegates) (11,841 votes)	0% (0 delegates) (247 votes)	34% (0 delegates) (40,954 votes)	25% (0 delegates) (30,021 votes)	3% (0 delegates) (4,099 votes)	13% (0 delegates) (15,960 votes)	0% (0 delegates) (506 votes)	0 (0/0) (119,188 votes)
Jan. 8, 2008	New Hampshire; Binding primary	37% (7 delegates) (88,713 votes)	8% (0 delegates) (18,346 votes)	0% (0 delegates) (205 votes)	11% (1 delegate) (26,916 votes)	32% (4 delegates) (75,675 votes)	9% (0 delegates) (20,344 votes)	1% (0 delegates) (2,956 votes)	1% (0 delegates) (1,192 votes)	12 (0/12) (239,793 votes)
Jan. 15, 2008	Michigan^{[C]} Binding primary	30% (7 delegates) (257,985 votes)	6% (0 delegates) (54,475 votes)		16% (3 delegates) (139,764 votes)	39% (20 delegates) (338,316 votes)	3% (0 delegates) (24,725 votes)	4% (0 delegates) (32,159 votes)	0% (0 delegates) (2,819 votes)	30 (0/30) (869,169 votes)
Jan. 19, 2008	Nevada^{[B]} Nonbinding precinct caucuses	13% (0 delegates) (5,650 votes)	14% (0 delegates) (6,084 votes)		8% (0 delegates) (3,616 votes)	51% (0 delegates) (22,646 votes)	4% (0 delegates) (1,910 votes)	8% (0 delegates) (3,519 votes)	2% (0 delegates) (890 votes)	0 (0/0) (44,315 votes)
Jan. 19, 2008	South Carolina; Binding primary	33% (18 delegates) (147,686 votes)	4% (0 delegates) (16,154 votes)		30% (6 delegates) (132,943 votes)	15% (0 delegates) (68,142 votes)	2% (0 delegates) (9,557 votes)	16% (0 delegates) (69,651 votes)	0% (0 delegates) (1,051 votes)	24 (0/24) (445,499 votes)
Jan. 29, 2008	Florida; Binding primary	36% (57 delegates) (701,761 votes)	3% (0 delegates) (62,887 votes)	0% (0 delegates) (4,060 votes)	13% (0 delegates) (262,681 votes)	31% (0 delegates) (604,932 votes)	15% (0 delegates) (286,089 votes)	1% (0 delegates) (22,668 votes)	0% (0 delegates) (2,847 votes)	57 (0/57) (1,949,498 votes)
Feb. 1–3, 2008	Maine^{[B]} Nonbinding precinct caucuses	21% (0 delegates) (1,144 votes)	18% (0 delegates) (997 votes)	0% (0 delegates) (1 vote)	6% (0 delegates) (312 votes)	52% (0 delegates) (2,826 votes)	0% (0 delegates) (3 votes)	0% (0 delegates) (7 votes)	0% (0 delegates) (0 vote)	0 (0/0) (5,431 votes)
Feb. 5, 2008; Super Tuesday	Alabama; Binding primary	37% (19 delegates) (204,867 votes)	3% (0 delegates) (14,810 votes)	0% (0 delegates) (778 votes)	41% (26 delegates) (227,766 votes)	18% (0 delegates) (98,019 votes)	0% (0 delegates) (2,134 votes)	0% (0 delegates) (1,835 votes)	0% (0 delegates) (391 votes)	45 (3/48) (552,155 votes)
Feb. 5, 2008; Super Tuesday	Alaska; Binding district caucuses	16% (3 delegates) (2,132 votes)	17% (5 delegates) (2,363 votes)	-	22% (6 delegates) (2,996 votes)	44% (12 delegates) (5,988 votes)	-	-	-	26 (3/29) (13,703 votes)
Feb. 5, 2008; Super Tuesday	Arizona; Binding primary	47% (50 delegates) (255,197 votes)	4% (0 delegates) (22,692 votes)	0% (0 delegates) (970 votes)	9% (0 delegates) (48,849 votes)	35% (0 delegates) (186,838 votes)	3% (0 delegates) (13,658 votes)	2% (0 delegates) (9,492 votes)	0% (0 delegates) (1,082 votes)	50 (3/53) (541,035 votes)
Feb. 5, 2008; Super Tuesday	Arkansas; Binding primary	20% (1 delegate) (46,343 votes)	5% (0 delegates) (10,983 votes)		60% (29 delegates) (138,557 votes)	14% (1 delegate) (30,997 votes)	0% (0 delegates) (658 votes)	0% (0 delegates) (628 votes)		31 (3/34) (229,153 votes)
Feb. 5, 2008; Super Tuesday	California; Binding primary	42% (155 delegates) (1,238,988 votes)	4% (0 delegates) (125,365 votes)	0% (0 delegates) (11,742 votes)	12% (0 delegates) (340,669 votes)	35% (15 delegates) (1,013,471 votes)	4% (0 delegates) (128,681 votes)	2% (0 delegates) (50,275 votes)	0% (0 delegates) (14,021 votes)	170 (3/173) (2,932,811 votes)
Feb. 5, 2008; Super Tuesday	Colorado^{[C][E]} Nonbinding precinct caucuses	19% (0 delegates) (12,918 votes)	8% (0 delegates) (5,910 votes)	0% (0 delegates) (67 votes)	13% (0 delegates) (8,960 votes)	60% (0 delegates) (42,218 votes)	0% (0 delegates) (58 votes)	0% (0 delegates) (63 votes)	0% (0 delegates) (25 votes)	0 (0/0) (70,229 votes)
Feb. 5, 2008; Super Tuesday	Connecticut; Binding primary	52% (27 delegates) (78,836 votes)	4% (0 delegates) (6,287 votes)	0% (0 delegates) (376 votes)	7% (0 delegates) (10,607 votes)	33% (0 delegates) (49,891 votes)	2% (0 delegates) (2,470 votes)	0% (0 delegates) (538 votes)	0% (0 delegates) (137 votes)	27 (3/30) (151,604 votes)
Feb. 5, 2008; Super Tuesday	Delaware; Binding primary	45% (18 delegates) (22,226 votes)	4% (0 delegates) (2,083 votes)	-	15% (0 delegates) (7,577 votes)	33% (0 delegates) (16,060 votes)	3% (0 delegates) (1,161 votes)	-	-	18 (0/18) (49,281 votes)
Feb. 5, 2008; Super Tuesday	Georgia; Binding primary	32% (9 delegates) (304,751 votes)	3% (0 delegates) (28,096 votes)	0% (0 delegates) (1,458 votes)	34% (54 delegates) (326,874 votes)	30% (9 delegates) (290,707 votes)	0% (0 delegates) (7,162 votes)	0% (0 delegates) (3,414 votes)	0% (0 delegates) (755 votes)	72 (0/72) (963,541 votes)
Feb. 5, 2008; Super Tuesday	Illinois^{[D]} Binding primary	47% (54 delegates) (426,777 votes)	5% (0 delegates) (45,055 votes)	0% (0 delegates) (2,318 votes)	16% (0 delegates) (148,053 votes)	29% (3 delegates) (257,265 votes)	1% (0 delegates) (11,837 votes)	1% (0 delegates) (7,259 votes)		57 (3/60) (899,422 votes)
Feb. 5, 2008; Super Tuesday	Massachusetts; Binding primary	41% (18 delegates) (204,779 votes)	3% (0 delegates) (13,251 votes)		4% (0 delegates) (19,103 votes)	51% (22 delegates) (255,892 votes)	1% (0 delegates) (2,707 votes)	0% (0 delegates) (916 votes)	0% (0 delegates) (258 votes)	40 (3/43) (501,997 votes)
Feb. 5, 2008; Super Tuesday	Minnesota^{[B][D]} Nonbinding precinct caucuses	22% (0 delegates) (13,826 votes)	16% (0 delegates) (9,852 votes)	1% (0 delegates) (368 votes)	20% (0 delegates) (12,493 votes)	41% (0 delegates) (25,990 votes)	-	-	-	0 (0/0) (62,828 votes)
Feb. 5, 2008; Super Tuesday	Missouri; Binding primary	33% (58 delegates) (194,053 votes)	5% (0 delegates) (26,464 votes)	0% (0 delegates) (892 votes)	32% (0 delegates) (185,642 votes)	29% (0 delegates) (172,329 votes)	1% (0 delegates) (3,593 votes)	1% (0 delegates) (3,102 votes)	0% (0 delegates) (307 votes)	58 (0/58) (588,844 votes)
Feb. 5, 2008; Super Tuesday	Montana; Binding county caucuses	22% (0 delegates) (358 votes)	25% (0 delegates) (400 votes)	0% (0 delegates) (2 votes)	15% (0 delegates) (245 votes)	38% (25 delegates) (625 votes)	-	-	-	25 (0/25) (1,630 votes)
Feb. 5, 2008; Super Tuesday	New Jersey; Binding primary	55% (52 delegates) (313,459 votes)	5% (0 delegates) (27,301 votes)		8% (0 delegates) (46,284 votes)	28% (0 delegates) (160,388 votes)	3% (0 delegates) (15,516 votes)	1% (0 delegates) (3,253 votes)		52 (0/52) (566,201 votes)
Feb. 5, 2008; Super Tuesday	New York^{[D]} Binding primary	52% (87 delegates) (333,001 votes)	6% (0 delegates) (40,113 votes)		10% (0 delegates) (68,477 votes)	25% (0 delegates) (178,043 votes)	3% (0 delegates) (23,260 votes)			87 (0/87) (670,078 votes)
Feb. 5, 2008; Super Tuesday	North Dakota; Binding district caucuses	23% (5 delegates) (2,224 votes)	21% (5 delegates) (2,082 votes)	0% (0 delegates) (42 votes)	20% (5 delegates) (1,947 votes)	36% (8 delegates) (3,490 votes)	-	-	-	23 (3/26) (9,785 votes)
Feb. 5, 2008; Super Tuesday	Oklahoma; Binding primary	37% (32 delegates) (122,772 votes)	3% (0 delegates) (11,183 votes)	0% (0 delegates) (817 votes)	33% (6 delegates) (111,899 votes)	25% (0 delegates) (83,030 votes)	1% (0 delegates) (2,412 votes)	1% (0 delegates) (1,924 votes)	0% (0 delegates) (317 votes)	38 (3/41) (335,054 votes)
Feb. 5, 2008; Super Tuesday	Tennessee; Binding primary	32% (20 delegates) (176,091 votes)	6% (0 delegates) (31,026 votes)	0% (0 delegates) (978 votes)	34% (24 delegates) (190,904 votes)	24% (8 delegates) (130,632 votes)	1% (0 delegates) (5,159 votes)	3% (0 delegates) (16,263 votes)	0% (0 delegates) (738 votes)	52 (3/55) (553,815 votes)
Feb. 5, 2008; Super Tuesday	Utah; Binding primary	5% (0 delegates) (15,931 votes)	3% (0 delegates) (8,846 votes)	0% (0 delegates) (261 votes)	1% (0 delegates) (4,252 votes)	89% (36 delegates) (264,956 votes)	0% (0 delegates) (988 votes)	0% (0 delegates) (613 votes)	0% (0 delegates) (211 votes)	36 (0/36) (296,061 votes)
Feb. 9, 2008	Kansas; Binding precinct caucuses	24% (0 delegates) (4,587 votes)	11% (0 delegates) (2,182 votes)	1% (0 delegates) (288 votes)	41% (36 delegates) (11,627 votes)	3% (0 delegates) (653 votes)	0% (0 delegates) (34 votes)	0% (0 delegates) (61 votes)		36 (3/39) (19,516 votes)
Feb. 9, 2008	Louisiana^{[D]} Binding primary	42% (0 delegates) (67,551 votes)	5% (0 delegates) (8,590 votes)	1% (0 delegates) (837 votes)	43% (0 delegates) (69,594 votes)	6% (0 delegates) (10,222 votes)	1% (0 delegates) (1,593 votes)	1% (0 delegates) (1,603 votes)	0% (0 delegates) (368 votes)	0 (20/20) (161,169 votes)
Feb. 9, 2008	Washington^{[B][D]} Nonbinding precinct caucuses	26% (0 delegates) (3,468 votes)	21% (0 delegates) (2,799 votes)	-	24% (0 delegates) (3,226 votes)	17% (0 delegates) (2,253 votes)	-	-	-	0 (0/0) (13,475 votes)
Feb. 12, 2008	District of Columbia; Binding primary	68% (16 delegates) (4,198 votes)	8% (0 delegates) (494 votes)		16% (0 delegates) (1,020 votes)	6% (0 delegates) (398 votes)	2% (0 delegates) (101 votes)			16 (3/19) (6,211 votes)
Feb. 12, 2008	Maryland; Binding primary	55% (37 delegates) (176,046 votes)	6% (0 delegates) (19,196 votes)	1% (0 delegates) (3,386 votes)	29% (0 delegates) (91,608 votes)	7% (0 delegates) (22,426 votes)	1% (0 delegates) (4,548 votes)	1% (0 delegates) (2,901 votes)	0% (0 delegates) (522 votes)	37 (0/37) (320,989 votes)
Feb. 12, 2008	Virginia; Binding primary	50% (63 delegates) (244,829 votes)	4% (0 delegates) (21,999 votes)		41% (0 delegates) (199,003 votes)	4% (0 delegates) (18,002 votes)	0% (0 delegates) (2,024 votes)	1% (0 delegates) (3,395 votes)		63 (0/63) (489,252 votes)
Feb. 19, 2008	Washington^{[D]} Binding primary	49% (16 delegates) (262,304 votes)	8% (0 delegates) (40,539 votes)	0% (0 delegates) (2,226 votes)	24% (3 delegates) (127,657 votes)	16% (0 delegates) (86,140 votes)	1% (0 delegates) (5,145 votes)	1% (0 delegates) (4,865 votes)	0% (0 delegates) (1,056 votes)	19 (3/22) (529,932 votes)
Feb. 19, 2008	Wisconsin; Binding primary	55% (34 delegates) (224,755 votes)	5% (0 delegates) (19,090 votes)		37% (6 delegates) (151,707 votes)	2% (0 delegates) (8,080 votes)	0% (0 delegates) (1,935 votes)	1% (0 delegates) (2,709 votes)	0% (0 delegates) (799 votes)	40 (0/40) (410,607 votes)
Feb. 23, 2008	American Samoa; Binding territorial convention	100% (9 delegates) (N/A votes)	-	-	-	-	-	-	-	6 (3/9) (N/A votes)
Feb. 23, 2008	Northern Mariana Islands; Binding territorial convention	91% (9 delegates) (105 votes)	4% (0 delegates) (5 votes)	-	4% (0 delegates) (5 votes)	-	-	-	-	0 (9/9) (115 votes)
Feb. 24, 2008	Puerto Rico; Binding territorial caucuses	90% (20 delegates) (188 votes)	4% (0 delegates) (9 votes)	-	5% (0 delegates) (10 votes)	-	-	-	-	20 (3/23) (208 votes)
Mar. 4, 2008	Ohio; Binding primary	60% (85 delegates) (656,687 votes)	4% (0 delegates) (49,027 votes)		31% (0 delegates) (335,356 votes)	3% (0 delegates) (36,031 votes)		2% (0 delegates) (16,879 votes)		85 (3/88) (1,093,980 votes)
Mar. 4, 2008	Rhode Island; Binding primary	65% (13 delegates) (17,480 votes)	7% (4 delegates) (1,777 votes)	0% (0 delegates) (117 votes)	22% (0 delegates) (5,847 votes)	4% (0 delegates) (1,181 votes)				17 (3/20) (26,996 votes)
Mar. 4, 2008	Texas; Binding primary	51% (120 delegates) (697,767 votes)	5% (0 delegates) (66,360 votes)	1% (0 delegates) (8,260 votes)	38% (17 delegates) (518,002 votes)	2% (0 delegates) (27,264 votes)	0% (0 delegates) (6,038 votes)	1% (0 delegates) (11,503 votes)	1% (0 delegates) (8,222 votes)	137 (3/140) (1,362,322 votes)
Mar. 4, 2008	Vermont; Binding primary	71% (17 delegates) (28,417 votes)	7% (0 delegates) (2,635 votes)		14% (0 delegates) (5,698 votes)	5% (0 delegates) (1,809 votes)	2% (0 delegates) (931 votes)			17 (0/17) (39,843 votes)
Mar. 8, 2008	Guam; Binding territorial convention	100% (9 delegates) (N/A votes)	-	-	-	-	-	-	-	0 (9/9) (N/A votes)
Mar. 11, 2008	Mississippi; Binding primary	79% (36 delegates) (113,074 votes)	4% (0 delegates) (5,510 votes)	1% (0 delegates) (842 votes)	13% (0 delegates) (17,943 votes)	2% (0 delegates) (2,177 votes)	1% (0 delegates) (945 votes)	2% (0 delegates) (2,160 votes)	0% (0 delegates) (414 votes)	36 (3/39) (143,286 votes)
Mar. 11, 2008	U.S. Virgin Islands^{[E]} Binding territorial convention	32% (0 delegates) (102 votes)	3% (0 delegates) (9 votes)	-	-	19% (0 delegates) (60 votes)	-	-	-	6 (3/9) (324 votes)
Apr. 22, 2008	Pennsylvania^{[D]} Binding primary	73% (0 delegates) (595,175 votes)	16% (0 delegates) (129,323 votes)		11% (0 delegates) (92,430 votes)					61 (3/64) (816,928 votes)
May 6, 2008	Indiana^{[D]} Binding primary	78% (0 delegates) (320,318 votes)	8% (0 delegates) (31,612 votes)		10% (0 delegates) (41,173 votes)	5% (0 delegates) (19,581 votes)				27 (3/30) (412,684 votes)
May 6, 2008	North Carolina; Binding primary	74% (53 delegates) (383,085 votes)	7% (5 delegates) (37,260 votes)	3% (2 delegates) (13,596 votes)	12% (9 delegates) (63,018 votes)					69 (0/69) (517,583 votes)
May 13, 2008	Nebraska; Nonbinding primary	87% (0 delegates) (118,876 votes)	13% (0 delegates) (17,772 votes)							0 (0/0) (136,648 votes)
May 13, 2008	West Virginia^{[D]} Binding primary	76% (9 delegates) (90,469 votes)	5% (0 delegates) (5,969 votes)	1% (0 delegates) (1,441 votes)	10% (0 delegates) (12,310 votes)	4% (0 delegates) (5,242 votes)	2% (0 delegates) (2,875 votes)			9 (3/12) (119,034 votes)
May 20, 2008	Kentucky; Binding primary	72% (42 delegates) (142,918 votes)	7% (0 delegates) (13,427 votes)	1% (0 delegates) (2,044 votes)	8% (0 delegates) (16,388 votes)	5% (0 delegates) (9,206 votes)	2% (0 delegates) (3,055 votes)			42 (3/45) (197,793 votes)
May 20, 2008	Oregon; Binding primary	81% (23 delegates) (285,881 votes)	15% (4 delegates) (51,100 votes)							27 (3/30) (353,476 votes)
May 27, 2008	Idaho^{[D][F]} Binding primary	70% (17 delegates) (87,460 votes)	24% (6 delegates) (29,785 votes)							24 (3/27) (125,570 votes)
Jun. 3, 2008	Montana; Nonbinding primary	76% (0 delegates) (72,291 votes)	22% (0 delegates) (20,606 votes)							0 (0/0) (95,730 votes)
Jun. 3, 2008	New Mexico; Binding primary	86% (29 delegates) (95,378 votes)	14% (0 delegates) (15,561 votes)							29 (3/32) (110,939 votes)
Jun. 3, 2008	South Dakota; Binding primary	70% (24 delegates) (42,788 votes)	17% (0 delegates) (10,072 votes)		7% (0 delegates) (4,328 votes)	3% (0 delegates) (1,990 votes)				24 (3/27) (60,964 votes)

Legend:	1st place (popular vote)	2nd place (popular vote)	3rd place (popular vote)	Candidate has withdrawn	Candidate unable to appear on ballot	State with delegates halved due to penalty from RNC

=== Conventions ===
Dates	Contest	John McCain	Mike Huckabee	Mitt Romney	Unpledged Delegates	Total delegates
Jan. 5, 2008	Wyoming^{[D]} County conventions	-	-		(12 delegates)	12
Feb. 5, 2008	West Virginia^{[D][G]} State convention	1% (0 delegates)	52% (18 delegates)	47% (0 delegates)	-	18
Feb. 16, 2008	Louisiana^{[D]} State convention	-	-	-	(27 delegates)	27
Mar. 29–Apr. 19, 2008	Minnesota^{[D]} District conventions	-	-	-	(24 delegates)	24
Apr. 26 – Jul. 26, 2008	Nevada; State convention	convention recessed and cancelled				34
May 3, 2008	Maine; District caucuses and state convention	-	-	-	(21 delegates)	21
May 16–18, 2008	Hawaii; State convention	-	-	-	(20 delegates)	20
May 17–30, 2008	Colorado^{[D]} District Conventions	-	-	-	(21 delegates)	21
May 20–21, 2008	New York^{[D]} State convention	-	-	-	(14 delegates)	14
May 29–31, 2008	Minnesota^{[D]} State convention	-	-	-	(17 delegates)	17
May 29–31, 2008	Washington^{[D]} State Convention	-	-	-	(18 delegates)	18
May 30–31, 2008	Wyoming^{[D]} State convention	-	-	-	(2 delegates)	2
May 31, 2008	Colorado^{[D]} State Convention	-	-	-	(22 delegates)	22
Jun. 1–2, 2008	Indiana^{[D]} State convention	-	-	-	(27 delegates)	27
Jun. 6, 2008	Pennsylvania^{[D]} State convention	-	-	-	(10 delegates)	10
Jun. 7, 2008	Illinois^{[D]} State convention	-	-	-	(10 delegates)	10
Jun. 12–14, 2008	Idaho^{[D]} State convention	-	-	-	(5 delegates)	5
Jul. 11–12, 2008	Iowa; State convention	-	-	-	(40 delegates)	40
Jul. 12, 2008	Nebraska; State convention	-	-	-	(33 delegates)	33

=== Notes ===
^{A} Vote totals include votes for minor candidates, "uncommitted", "no preference", "write-ins", and other options.
^{B} Precinct or district delegates chosen during this caucus elected the state's national delegates at a later convention. National delegates were not pledged to any candidate based on the caucus results.
^{C} 20 Michigan delegates were initially projected for Mitt Romney, but because Romney suspended his campaign between the primary and the state convention for delegate selection, they were instead uncommitted.
^{D} This state selected delegates with multiple primaries, caucuses, or conventions.
^{E} In the U.S. Virgin Islands territorial meeting, 47% of the vote went to uncommitted.
^{F} One delegate from Idaho was pledged to "none of the above".
^{G} The Ron Paul campaign claimed to have received three West Virginia delegates in exchange for supporting Huckabee at the state convention. Two West Virginia delegates voted for Paul at the national convention.

== Results ==
=== Iowa caucuses ===
Caucus date: January 3, 2008
National delegates: 37 (of 40)

County results of the Iowa Republican caucuses. Mike Huckabee Mitt Romney Ron Paul

Precinct delegates selected in the January caucus gathered at county caucuses on March 8, from which district delegates were selected. District conventions were held in each of Iowa's congressional districts on April 19, from which state convention delegates were selected. Selection of 37 of Iowa's national delegates occurred at the state convention on July 11–12, 2008, and all 37 delegates were unpledged. The national committeeman, the national committeewoman, and the chairman of the Republican Party of Iowa also attended the national convention as unpledged delegates.

According to his campaign Website, Alan Keyes's votes were not counted nor recorded by the Republican Party of Iowa.

2008 Iowa Republican presidential caucuses
Candidate	Votes	Percentage	National delegates
Mike Huckabee	40,954	34.36%	0
Mitt Romney	30,021	25.19%	0
Fred Thompson	15,960	13.39%	0
John McCain	15,536	13.03%	0
Ron Paul	11,841	9.93%	0
Rudy Giuliani	4,099	3.44%	0
Duncan Hunter	506	0.42%	0
Alan Keyes	247	0.21%	0
John H. Cox	10	0.01%	0
Hugh Cort	5	0.00%	0
Tom Tancredo	5	0.00%	0
Vern Wuensche	2	0.00%	0
Sam Brownback	1	0.00%	0
Cap Fendig	1	0.00%	0
Uncommitted	-	0.00%	37
Total	119,188	100.00%	37

=== Wyoming county conventions ===
Convention date: January 5, 2008
National delegates: 12 (of 14; was 28)

County results of the Wyoming Republican caucuses. Mitt Romney Fred Thompson Duncan Hunter John McCain Uncommitted

In accordance with Republican National Committee rules, the Wyoming Republican Party was stripped of half of its 28 delegates for holding primary contests before February 5, 2008. Wyoming's delegates were officially unpledged, but reported affiliations with the candidates. Eight delegates intended to support Mitt Romney, three supported Fred Thompson, and one supported Duncan Hunter. Two additional unpledged delegates were selected at the state convention on May 10, 2008.

=== New Hampshire primary ===
Primary date: January 8, 2008
National delegates: 12 (was 24)

County (top) and Municipal (bottom) results of the New Hampshire Republican primary.
John McCain
Mitt Romney
Mike Huckabee
Rudy Guliani
Ron Paul
Tie
Not reported

In accordance with Republican National Committee rules, the New Hampshire Republican State Committee was stripped of half of its 24 delegates for holding primary contests before February 5, 2008. Delegates were allocated proportionally to candidates that received at least 10% of the vote statewide. A hand recount of the primary results was funded by supporters of Ron Paul.

2008 New Hampshire Republican presidential primary
Candidate	Votes	Percentage	National delegates
John McCain	88,713	37.00%	7
Mitt Romney	75,675	31.56%	4
Mike Huckabee	26,916	11.22%	1
Rudy Giuliani	20,344	8.48%	0
Ron Paul	18,346	7.65%	0
Fred Thompson	2,956	1.23%	0
Barack Obama	1,996	0.83%	0
Hillary Clinton	1,828	0.76%	0
Duncan Hunter	1,192	0.50%	0
John Edwards	747	0.31%	0
Bill Richardson	210	0.09%	0
Alan Keyes	205	0.09%	0
Stephen W. Marchuk	127	0.05%	0
Write-in candidates	94	0.04%	0
Tom Tancredo	63	0.03%	0
Cornelius O'Connor	46	0.02%	0
Albert Howard	43	0.02%	0
Vermin Supreme	43	0.02%	0
John H. Cox	39	0.02%	0
Vern Wuensche	36	0.02%	0
Hugh Cort	35	0.01%	0
Daniel Gilbert	35	0.01%	0
Jack Shepard	28	0.01%	0
James Creighton Mitchell Jr.	26	0.01%	0
Mark Klein	16	0.01%	0
Dennis Kucinich	15	0.01%	0
H. Neal Fendig Jr.	13	0.01%	0
Mike Gravel	5	0.00%	0
Joe Biden	1	0.00%	0
Total	239,793	100.00%	12

=== Michigan primary ===
Primary date: January 15, 2008
National delegates: 30 (was 60)

County results of the Michigan Republican primary. Mitt Romney John McCain

In accordance with Republican National Committee rules, the Michigan Republican Party was stripped of 27 of its 57 delegates for holding primary contests before February 5, 2008. Delegates were allocated to the winner in each congressional district and to candidates that received at least 15% of the vote statewide. Mitt Romney was projected to win the majority of the pledged delegates, but suspended his campaign on February 5, prior to delegate selection, which occurred at caucuses held on February 15. The Michigan Republican Party stated that his delegates would be uncommitted upon selection.

2008 Michigan Republican presidential primary
Candidate	Votes	Percentage	National delegates
Mitt Romney	338,316	38.92%	20
John McCain	257,985	29.68%	7
Mike Huckabee	139,764	16.08%	3
Ron Paul	54,475	6.27%	0
Fred Thompson	32,159	3.70%	0
Rudy Giuliani	24,725	2.84%	0
Uncommitted	18,118	2.08%	0
Duncan Hunter	2,819	0.32%	0
Tom Tancredo	457	0.05%	0
Sam Brownback	351	0.04%	0
Total	869,169	100.00%	30

=== Nevada caucuses ===
Caucus date: January 19, 2008
National delegates: 31 (of 34)

County results of the Nevada Republican caucuses. Mitt Romney Ron Paul

Precinct delegates selected during the caucuses gathered at county conventions on March 15 to select state delegates for the state convention on April 26. The state convention was unexpectedly recessed following a dispute between supporters of John McCain and Ron Paul, and the party failed to reestablish a quorum of delegates on a later date to conclude the process. The official slate of delegates was decided by the executive committee of the Nevada Republican Party on July 26. The national committeeman, the national committeewoman, and the chairman of the Nevada Republican Party also attended the national convention as unpledged delegates.

Tom Tancredo did appear on the official ballot, but Nevada Republican Party did not count or record votes cast for him.

2008 Nevada Republican presidential caucus
Candidate	Votes	Percentage	National delegates
Mitt Romney	22,646	51.10%	0
Ron Paul	6,084	13.73%	0
John McCain	5,650	12.75%	0
Mike Huckabee	3,616	8.16%	0
Fred Thompson	3,519	7.94%	0
Rudy Giuliani	1,910	4.31%	0
Duncan Hunter	890	2.01%	0
Tom Tancredo	-	0.00%	0
Uncommitted	-	0.00%	31
Total	44,315	100.00%	31

=== South Carolina primary ===
Primary date: January 19, 2008
National delegates: 24 (was 47)

County results of the South Carolina Republican primary. John McCain Mike Huckabee

In accordance with Republican National Committee rules, the South Carolina Republican Party was stripped of 23 of its 47 delegates for holding primary contests before February 5, 2008. Delegates were allocated to the winner in each congressional district in the state and to the winner statewide.

2008 South Carolina Republican presidential primary
Candidate	Votes	Percentage	National delegates
John McCain	147,686	33.15%	18
Mike Huckabee	132,943	29.84%	6
Fred Thompson	69,651	15.63%	0
Mitt Romney	68,142	15.30%	0
Ron Paul	16,154	3.63%	0
Rudy Giuliani	9,557	2.15%	0
Duncan Hunter	1,051	0.24%	0
Tom Tancredo	121	0.03%	0
Hugh Cort	88	0.02%	0
John H. Cox	83	0.02%	0
Cap Fendig	23	0.01%	0
Total	445,499	100.00%	24

=== Louisiana caucuses ===
Caucus date: January 22, 2008
National delegates: 24 (of 47)

The district caucuses selected state delegates for the state convention on February 16, 2008. At the state convention, 24 unpledged delegates were selected by the state delegates, in addition to 20 delegates pledged based on the results of the primary election on February 9. The national committeeman, the national committeewoman, and the chairman of the Republican Party of Louisiana also attended the national convention as unpledged delegates. Results of the delegates selected were released by the Republican Party of Louisiana on January 29. Delegates ran on multiple platforms, making it difficult to distinguish which candidate they would support. A large number of delegates ran on an uncommitted pro-life platform. In the days after the caucuses, it was reported McCain had the support of the most delegates, followed by Paul and Romney. According to party chairman Roger Villere Jr., supporters of John McCain had majorities in congressional districts 1, 2, 3, 6, and 7, which he predicted would give McCain control of 41 of 47 of Louisiana's delegates. By February 1, the uncommitted pro-life delegates supported McCain, along with Louisiana's three RNC members, ensuring McCain would have control of Louisiana's delegation.

=== Hawaii caucuses ===
Caucus dates: January 25, 2008 – February 5, 2008
National delegates: 17 (of 20)

Delegates selected in the precinct caucuses attended a state convention from May 16–18, 2008. The convention selected 17 unpledged national delegates, all of whom supported McCain. The national committeeman, the national committeewoman, and the chairman of the Hawaii Republican Party also attended the national convention as unpledged delegates.

=== Florida primary ===
Primary date: January 29, 2008
National delegates: 57 (was 114)

County results of the Florida Republican primary. John McCain Mitt Romney Mike Huckabee

In accordance with Republican National Committee rules, the Republican Party of Florida was stripped of 57 of its 114 delegates for holding primary contests before February 5, 2008. The Florida primary was a winner-take-all contest with 57 delegates pledged to the winner statewide.

2008 Florida Republican presidential primary
Candidate	Votes	Percentage	National delegates
John McCain	701,761	36.0%	57
Mitt Romney	604,932	31.0%	0
Rudy Giuliani	286,089	14.7%	0
Mike Huckabee	262,681	13.5%	0
Ron Paul	62,887	3.2%	0
Fred Thompson	22,668	1.2%	0
Alan Keyes	4,060	0.2%	0
Duncan Hunter	2,847	0.1%	0
Tom Tancredo	1,573	0.1%	0
Total	1,949,498	100.00%	57

=== Maine caucuses ===
Caucus date: February 1, 2008 – February 3, 2008
National delegates: 18 (of 21)

County results of the Maine Republican caucuses. Mitt Romney John McCain Ron Paul

Official allocation of delegates was decided during district caucuses and the state convention on May 3, 2008. Although the state's delegates were officially unpledged to any candidate, Paul supporters succeeded in selecting a single pro-Paul delegate at a district convention on May 3, while the state convention selected twelve McCain supporters as delegates. The national committeeman, the national committeewoman, and the chairman of the Maine Republican Party also attended the national convention as unpledged delegates.

2008 Maine Republican presidential caucuses
Candidate	Votes	Percentage	National delegates (projected)
Mitt Romney	2,837	51.66%	0
John McCain	1,176	21.41%	0
Ron Paul	1,002	18.24%	0
Mike Huckabee	318	5.79%	0
Uncommitted	136	2.47%	18
Write-in candidates	9	0.16%	0
Fred Thompson	8	0.14%	0
Rudy Giuliani	3	0.05%	0
Alan Keyes	1	0.02%	0
Duncan Hunter	1	0.02%	0
John H. Cox	0	0.00%	0
Total	5,491	100.00%	18

=== Alabama primary ===
Primary date: February 5, 2008
National delegates: 45 (of 48)

County results of the Alabama Republican primary. Mike Huckabee John McCain

Delegates were allocated to the winners in each congressional district if they received over 50% of the vote, and the winner and runner-up in each district if the winner received less. Delegates were also allocated proportionally statewide to candidates receiving at least 20% of the vote. The national committeeman, the national committeewoman, and the chairman of the Alabama Republican Party also attended the national convention as unpledged delegates.

2008 Alabama Republican presidential primary
Candidate	Votes	Percentage	National delegates
Mike Huckabee	227,766	41.25%	26
John McCain	204,867	37.10%	19
Mitt Romney	98,019	17.75%	0
Ron Paul	14,810	2.68%	0
Rudy Giuliani	2,134	0.39%	0
Fred Thompson	1,835	0.33%	0
Uncommitted	1,234	0.22%	0
Alan Keyes	778	0.14%	0
Duncan Hunter	391	0.07%	0
Hugh Cort	228	0.04%	0
Tom Tancredo	93	0.02%	0
Total	552,155	100.00%	45

=== Alaska caucuses ===
Caucus date: February 5, 2008
National delegates: 26 (of 29)

Delegates were allocated proportionally based on the statewide results of the caucuses. The national committeeman, the national committeewoman, and the chairman of the Alaska Republican Party also attended the national convention as unpledged delegates.

2008 Alaska Republican presidential primary
Candidate	Votes	Percentage	National delegates
Mitt Romney	5,988	43.70%	12
Mike Huckabee	2,996	21.86%	6
Ron Paul	2,363	17.24%	5
John McCain	2,132	15.56%	3
Uncommitted	224	1.63%	0
Total	13,703	100.00%	26

=== Arizona primary ===
Primary date: February 5, 2008
National delegates: 50 (of 53)

County results of the Arizona Republican primary. John McCain Mitt Romney

The Arizona primary was a winner-take-all contest with 50 delegates pledged to the winner statewide. The national committeeman, the national committeewoman, and the chairman of the Arizona Republican Party also attended the national convention as unpledged delegates.

2008 Arizona Republican presidential primary
Candidate	Votes	Percentage	National delegates
John McCain	255,197	47.17%	50
Mitt Romney	186,838	34.53%	0
Mike Huckabee	48,849	9.03%	0
Ron Paul	22,692	4.19%	0
Rudy Giuliani	13,658	2.52%	0
Fred Thompson	9,492	1.75%	0
Duncan Hunter	1,082	0.20%	0
Alan Keyes	970	0.18%	0
John R. McGrath	490	0.09%	0
Frank McEnulty	333	0.06%	0
Sean Murphy	269	0.05%	0
John Fitzpatrick	199	0.04%	0
James Creighton Mitchell	193	0.04%	0
David Ruben	104	0.02%	0
Michael Burzynski	98	0.02%	0
Jerry Curry	98	0.02%	0
Jack Shepard	78	0.01%	0
Bob Forthan	75	0.01%	0
Michael Shaw	62	0.01%	0
Hugh Cort	58	0.01%	0
Daniel Gilbert	53	0.01%	0
Rick Outzen	53	0.01%	0
Charles Skelley	50	0.01%	0
Rhett Smith	44	0.01%	0
Total	541,035	100.00%	50

=== Arkansas primary ===
Primary date: February 5, 2008
National delegates: 31 (of 34)

County results of the Arkansas Republican primary. Mike Huckabee

Delegates were allocated to the winners in each congressional district if they received over 50% of the vote, and the winner and runner-up in each district if the winner received less. Delegates were also allocated to candidates receiving at least 10% of the vote statewide. The national committeeman, the national committeewoman, and the chairman of the Republican Party of Arkansas also attended the national convention as unpledged delegates.

2008 Arkansas Republican presidential primary
Candidate	Votes	Percentage	National delegates
Mike Huckabee	138,557	60.46%	29
John McCain	46,343	20.22%	1
Mitt Romney	30,997	13.53%	1
Ron Paul	10,983	4.79%	0
Uncommitted	987	0.43%	0
Rudy Giuliani	658	0.29%	0
Fred Thompson	628	0.27%	0
Total	229,153	100.00%	31

=== California primary ===
Primary date: February 5, 2008
National delegates: 170 (of 173)

County results of the California Republican primary. John McCain Mitt Romney

Delegates were allocated to the winner in each congressional district in the state and to the winner statewide. The national committeeman, the national committeewoman, and the chairman of the California Republican Party also attended the national convention as unpledged delegates.

2008 California Republican presidential primary
Candidate	Votes	Percentage	National delegates
John McCain	1,238,988	42.25%	155
Mitt Romney	1,013,471	34.56%	15
Mike Huckabee	340,669	11.62%	0
Rudy Giuliani	128,681	4.39%	0
Ron Paul	125,365	4.27%	0
Fred Thompson	50,275	1.71%	0
Duncan Hunter	14,021	0.48%	0
Alan Keyes	11,742	0.40%	0
Tom Tancredo	3,884	0.13%	0
John H. Cox	3,219	0.11%	0
Sam Brownback	2,486	0.08%	0
Write-in candidates	10	0.00%	0
Total	2,932,811	100.00%	170

=== Colorado caucuses ===
Caucus date: February 5, 2008
National delegates: 43 (of 46)

County results of the Colorado Republican caucuses. Mitt Romney John McCain Mike Huckabee

The caucuses included a non-binding straw poll of presidential preference. Voters at each precinct then selected district delegates to convene in district conventions from May 17 to May 30, 2008, where 21 national delegates were selected, as well as delegates to the state convention on May 31. An additional 22 delegates were selected at a state convention. No delegates were pledged to any candidate. The national committeeman, the national committeewoman, and the chairman of the Colorado Republican Party also attended the national convention as unpledged delegates.

2008 Colorado Republican presidential caucuses
Candidate	State delegates	Percentage	National delegates
Mitt Romney	42,218	60.11%	0
John McCain	12,918	18.39%	0
Mike Huckabee	8,960	12.76%	0
Ron Paul	5,910	8.42%	0
Alan Keyes	67	0.10%	0
Fred Thompson	63	0.09%	0
Rudy Giuliani	58	0.08%	0
Duncan Hunter	25	0.04%	0
Tom Tancredo	10	0.01%	0
Uncommitted	-	0.00%	43
Total	70,229	100.00%	43

=== Connecticut primary ===
Primary date: February 5, 2008
National delegates: 27 (of 30)

County results of the Connecticut Republican primary. John McCain

The Connecticut primary was a winner-take-all contest with 27 delegates pledged to the winner statewide. The national committeeman, the national committeewoman, and the chairman of the Connecticut Republican Party also attended the national convention as unpledged delegates.

2008 Connecticut Republican presidential primary
Candidate	Votes	Percentage	National delegates
John McCain	78,836	52.00%	27
Mitt Romney	49,891	32.91%	0
Mike Huckabee	10,607	7.00%	0
Ron Paul	6,287	4.15%	0
Rudy Giuliani	2,470	1.63%	0
Uncommitted	2,462	1.62%	0
Fred Thompson	538	0.35%	0
Alan Keyes	376	0.25%	0
Duncan Hunter	137	0.09%	0
Total	151,605	100.00%	27

=== Delaware primary ===
Primary date: February 5, 2008
National delegates: 18

County results of the Delaware Republican primary. John McCain

The Delaware primary was a winner-take-all contest with 18 delegates pledged to the winner statewide.

2008 Delaware Republican presidential primary
Candidate	Votes	Percentage	National delegates
John McCain	22,226	45.10%	18
Mitt Romney	16,060	32.59%	0
Mike Huckabee	7,577	15.38%	0
Ron Paul	2,083	4.23%	0
Rudy Giuliani	1,161	2.36%	0
Tom Tancredo	174	0.35%	0
Total	49,281	100.00%	18

=== Georgia primary ===
Primary date: February 5, 2008
National delegates: 72

County results of the Georgia Republican primary. Mike Huckabee John McCain Mitt Romney

Delegates were allocated to the winner in each congressional district in the state and to the winner statewide.

2008 Georgia Republican presidential primary
Candidate	Votes	Percentage	National delegates
Mike Huckabee	326,874	33.92%	54
John McCain	304,751	31.63%	9
Mitt Romney	290,707	30.17%	9
Ron Paul	28,096	2.92%	0
Rudy Giuliani	7,162	0.74%	0
Fred Thompson	3,414	0.35%	0
Alan Keyes	1,458	0.15%	0
Duncan Hunter	755	0.08%	0
Tom Tancredo	324	0.03%	0
Total	963,541	100.00%	72

=== Illinois primary ===
Primary date: February 5, 2008
National delegates: 57 (of 70)

County results of the Illinois Republican primary. John McCain Mitt Romney Mike Huckabee

57 delegates were directly elected alongside a statewide presidential preference vote. 10 other unpledged delegates were selected during the state convention on June 7, 2008. The national committeeman, the national committeewoman, and the chairman of the Illinois Republican Party also attended the national convention as unpledged delegates.

2008 Illinois Republican presidential primary
Candidate	Votes	Percentage	National delegates
John McCain	426,777	47.45%	54
Mitt Romney	257,265	28.60%	3
Mike Huckabee	148,053	16.46%	0
Ron Paul	45,055	5.01%	0
Rudy Giuliani	11,837	1.32%	0
Fred Thompson	7,259	0.81%	0
Alan Keyes	2,318	0.26%	0
James Mitchell	483	0.05%	0
Tom Tancredo	375	0.04%	0
Totals	899,422	100.00%	57

=== Massachusetts primary ===
Primary date: February 5, 2008
National delegates: 40 (of 43)

Delegates were proportionally allocated to candidates that received at least 15% of the vote statewide. The national committeeman, the national committeewoman, and the chairman of the Massachusetts Republican Party also attended the national convention as unpledged delegates.

County results of the Massachusetts Republican primary. Mitt Romney John McCain

2008 Massachusetts Republican presidential primary
Candidate	Votes	Percentage	National delegates
Mitt Romney	255,892	50.97%	22
John McCain	204,779	40.79%	18
Mike Huckabee	19,103	3.81%	0
Ron Paul	13,251	2.64%	0
Rudy Giuliani	2,707	0.54%	0
No preference	1,959	0.29%	0
Write-in candidates	1,532	0.39%	0
Blank ballots	1,447	0.31%	0
Fred Thompson	916	0.18%	0
Duncan Hunter	258	0.05%	0
Tom Tancredo	153	0.03%	0
Total	501,997	100.00%	40

=== Minnesota caucuses ===
Caucus date: February 5, 2008
National delegates: 38 (of 41)

County results of the Minnesota Republican caucuses. Mitt Romney John McCain Mike Huckabee Ron Paul

The caucuses involved a non-binding straw poll and selection of precinct delegates to attend basic political organization unit conventions held between February 22 and March 15, 2008. These conventions selected delegates to attend congressional district conventions between March 29 and April 19, where 24 national delegates were selected. The district conventions also selected delegates to attend the state convention on May 29–31, where an additional 14 national delegates were selected. The national committeeman, the National Committeewoman, and the chairman of the Republican Party of Minnesota also attended the national convention as unpledged delegates. Six of the district delegates were reportedly Paul supporters, while the 14 delegates selected at the state convention supported McCain.

2008 Minnesota Republican presidential caucuses
Candidate	Votes	Percentage	National delegates
Mitt Romney	25,990	41.37%	0
John McCain	13,826	22.01%	0
Mike Huckabee	12,493	19.88%	0
Ron Paul	9,852	15.68%	0
Alan Keyes	368	0.59%	0
Write-in candidates	299	0.48%	0
Uncommitted	-	0.00%	38
Total	62,828	100.00%	38

=== Missouri primary ===
Primary date: February 5, 2008
National delegates: 58

County results of the Missouri Republican primary. John McCain Mike Huckabee Mitt Romney

The Missouri primary was a winner-take-all contest with 58 delegates pledged to the winner statewide.

2008 Missouri Republican presidential primary
Candidate	Votes	Percentage	National delegates
John McCain	194,053	32.95%	58
Mike Huckabee	185,642	31.53%	0
Mitt Romney	172,329	29.27%	0
Ron Paul	26,464	4.49%	0
Rudy Giuliani	3,593	0.61%	0
Fred Thompson	3,102	0.53%	0
Uncommitted	2,097	0.36%	0
Alan Keyes	892	0.15%	0
Duncan Hunter	307	0.05%	0
Virgil Wiles	124	0.02%	0
Tom Tancredo	107	0.02%	0
Daniel Gilbert	88	0.01%	0
Hugh Cort	46	0.01%	0
Total	588,844	100.00%	58

=== Montana caucuses ===
Caucus date: February 5, 2008
National delegates: 25

County results of the Montana Republican caucuses. Mitt Romney Ron Paul John McCain Mike Huckabee

The Montana caucus was a winner-take-all contest with 25 delegates pledged to the winner statewide.

2008 Montana Republican presidential caucuses
Candidate	State delegates	Percentage	National delegates
Mitt Romney	625	38.34%	25
Ron Paul	400	24.54%	0
John McCain	358	21.96%	0
Mike Huckabee	245	15.03%	0
Alan Keyes	2	0.12%	0
Total	1,630	100.00%	25

=== New Jersey primary ===
Primary date: February 5, 2008
National delegates: 52

County results of the New Jersey Republican primary. John McCain

The New Jersey primary was a winner-take-all contest with 52 delegates pledged to the winner statewide.

2008 New Jersey Republican presidential primary
Candidate	Votes	Percentage	National delegates
John McCain	313,459	55.36%	52
Mitt Romney	160,388	28.33%	0
Mike Huckabee	46,284	8.17%	0
Ron Paul	27,301	4.82%	0
Rudy Giuliani	15,516	2.74%	0
Fred Thompson	3,253	0.57%	0
Total	566,201	100.00%	52

=== New York primary ===
Primary date: February 5, 2008
National delegates: 87 (of 101)

County results of the New York Republican primary. John McCain

The New York primary was a winner-take-all contest with 87 delegates pledged to the winner statewide. Eleven other unpledged delegates were selected during the state committee meeting on May 20–21, 2008. The national committeeman, the national committeewoman, and the chairman of the New York Republican State Committee also attended the national convention as unpledged delegates.

2008 New York Republican presidential primary
Candidate	Votes	Percentage	National delegates
John McCain	333,001	49.70%	87
Mitt Romney	178,043	26.57%	0
Mike Huckabee	68,477	10.22%	0
Ron Paul	40,113	5.99%	0
Rudy Giuliani	23,260	3.47%	0
Blank/void/scattering	27,184	4.06%	0
Total	670,078	100.00%	87

=== North Dakota caucuses ===
Caucus date: February 5, 2008
National delegates: 23 (of 26)

State House district results of the North Dakota Republican caucuses. Mitt Romney John McCain Ron Paul Mike Huckabee

Delegates were allocated proportionally to candidates that received at least 15% of the vote statewide. The national committeeman, the national committeewoman, and the chairman of the North Dakota Republican Party also attended the national convention as unpledged delegates.

2008 North Dakota Republican presidential caucuses
Candidate	Votes	Percentage	Delegates
Mitt Romney	3,490	35.67%	8
John McCain	2,224	22.73%	5
Ron Paul	2,082	21.28%	5
Mike Huckabee	1,947	19.90%	5
Alan Keyes	42	0.43%	0
Total	9,785	100.00%	23

=== Oklahoma primary ===
Primary date: February 5, 2008
National delegates: 38 (of 41)

Delegates were allocated to the winner in each congressional district in the state and to the winner statewide. The national committeeman, the national committeewoman, and the chairman of the Oklahoma Republican Party also attended the national convention as unpledged delegates.

County results of the Oklahoma Republican primary. John McCain Mike Huckabee

2008 Oklahoma Republican presidential primary
Candidate	Votes	Percentage	Delegates
John McCain	122,772	36.64%	32
Mike Huckabee	111,899	33.40%	6
Mitt Romney	83,030	24.78%	0
Ron Paul	11,183	3.34%	0
Rudy Giuliani	2,412	0.72%	0
Fred Thompson	1,924	0.57%	0
Alan Keyes	817	0.24%	0
Jerry Curry	387	0.12%	0
Duncan Hunter	317	0.09%	0
Tom Tancredo	189	0.06%	0
Daniel Gilbert	124	0.04%	0
Total	335,054	100.00%	38

=== Tennessee primary ===
Primary date: February 5, 2008
National delegates: 52 (of 55)

County results of the Tennessee Republican primary. Mike Huckabee John McCain Mitt Romney

39 of the 52 delegates were directly pledged in the primary election, with the remaining 13 selected at the state executive committee meeting on March 1. The national committeeman, the national committeewoman, and the chairman of the Tennessee Republican Party attended the convention as unpledged delegates.

2008 Tennessee Republican presidential primary
Candidate	Votes	Percentage	Estimated delegates
Mike Huckabee	190,904	34.47%	24
John McCain	176,091	31.80%	20
Mitt Romney	130,632	23.59%	8
Ron Paul	31,026	5.60%	0
Fred Thompson	16,263	2.94%	0
Rudy Giuliani	5,159	0.93%	0
Uncommitted	1,830	0.33%	0
Alan Keyes	978	0.18%	0
Duncan Hunter	738	0.13%	0
Tom Tancredo	194	0.04%	0
Total	553,815	100.00%	52

=== Utah primary ===
Primary date: February 5, 2008
National delegates: 36

County results of the Utah Republican primary. Mitt Romney

The Utah primary was a winner-take-all contest with 36 delegates pledged to the winner statewide.

2008 Utah Republican presidential primary
Candidate	Votes	Percentage	National delegates
Mitt Romney	264,956	89.49%	36
John McCain	15,931	5.38%	0
Ron Paul	8,846	2.99%	0
Mike Huckabee	4,252	1.44%	0
Rudy Giuliani	988	0.33%	0
Fred Thompson	613	0.21%	0
Alan Keyes	261	0.09%	0
Duncan Hunter	211	0.07%	0
Tom Tancredo	3	0.00%	0
Total	296,061	100.00%	36

=== West Virginia state convention ===
Caucus date: February 5, 2008
National delegates: 18 (of 30)

18 delegates were pledged to the first candidate to receive the support of a majority of convention delegates. Nine other delegates were pledged based on a primary election on May 13, 2008. The national committeeman, the national committeewoman, and the chairman of the West Virginia Republican Party attended the convention as unpledged delegates.

The Ron Paul campaign claimed to have received three West Virginia delegates in exchange for supporting Huckabee at the state convention. Two West Virginia delegates voted for Paul at the national convention.

2008 West Virginia Republican state convention
Candidate	State delegates	Percentage	National delegates
Mike Huckabee	567	51.55%	18
Mitt Romney	521	47.36%	0
John McCain	12	1.09%	0
Total	1,100	100.00%	18

=== Kansas caucuses ===
Caucus date: February 9, 2008
National delegates: 36 (of 39)

Congressional district results of the Kansas Republican caucuses. Mike Huckabee

Delegates were allocated to the winner in each congressional district in the state and to the winner statewide. Kansas chose three additional unpledged delegates during the state committee meeting on May 22, 2008. The Green Papers reported two of the unpledged delegates supported McCain.

2008 Kansas Republican presidential caucuses
Candidate	Votes	Percentage	National delegates
Mike Huckabee	11,627	59.58%	36
John McCain	4,587	23.50%	0
Ron Paul	2,182	11.18%	0
Mitt Romney	653	3.35%	0
Alan Keyes	288	1.48%	0
Uncommitted	84	0.43%	0
Fred Thompson	61	0.31%	0
Rudy Giuliani	34	0.17%	0
Total	19,516	100.00%	36

=== Louisiana primary ===
Primary date: February 9, 2008
National delegates: 20 (of 47)

County results of the Louisiana Republican primary. Mike Huckabee John McCain

Party rules in Louisiana would pledge 20 delegates to the winner of the primary only if the candidate received 50% or more of the popular vote. Delegates were selected at the state convention on February 16. Since no candidate won the primary with this majority, the 20 delegates selected at the state convention on February 16 were officially unpledged. The convention, controlled by supporters of McCain, selected a slate of McCain supporters as national delegates. The McCain campaign had written or verbal support of 44 of the 47 delegates chosen at the convention.

2008 Louisiana Republican presidential primary
Candidate	Votes	Percentage	National delegates
Mike Huckabee	69,594	43.18%	0
John McCain	67,551	41.91%	0
Mitt Romney	10,222	6.34%	0
Ron Paul	8,590	5.33%	0
Fred Thompson	1,603	0.99%	0
Rudy Giuliani	1,593	0.99%	0
Alan Keyes	837	0.52%	0
Jerry Curry	521	0.32%	0
Duncan Hunter	368	0.23%	0
Daniel Gilbert	183	0.11%	0
Tom Tancredo	107	0.07%	0
Uncommitted	-	0.00%	20
Total	161,169	100.00%	20

=== Washington caucuses ===
Caucus date: February 9, 2008
National delegates: 18 (of 40)

County results of the Washington Republican caucuses. John McCain Mike Huckabee Ron Paul Mitt Romney Uncommitted

During the precinct caucuses, each precinct selected a delegate to attend county conventions. Between March 22 and May 3, the county conventions selected delegates to attend the district conventions, and the district conventions selected delegates to the state convention. The state convention convened from May 29–31 to select 18 unpledged delegates. An additional 19 delegates were pledged based on the results of a primary election on February 19. The national committeeman, the national committeewoman, and the chairman of the Washington State Republican Party attended the convention as unpledged delegates.

The Washington State Republican Party announced McCain as the winner of the caucuses with 87% of precincts reporting. Huckabee challenged the results, leading to a recount. McCain was again declared the winner based on the results of 96% of the precincts.

2008 Washington Republican presidential caucuses
Candidate	Votes	Percentage	National delegates
John McCain	3,468	25.74%	0
Mike Huckabee	3,226	23.94%	0
Ron Paul	2,799	20.77%	0
Mitt Romney	2,253	16.72%	0
Uncommitted	1,729	12.83%	18
Total	13,475	100.00%	18

=== District of Columbia primary ===
Primary date: February 12, 2008
National delegates: 16 (of 19)

Ward results of the Maryland Republican primary. John McCain Mike Huckabee

The District of Columbia primary was a winner-take-all contest with 16 delegates pledged to the winner statewide. The national committeeman, the national committeewoman, and the chairman of the District of Columbia Republican Party attended the convention as unpledged delegates.

2008 District of Columbia Republican presidential primary
Candidate	Votes	Percentage	National delegates
John McCain	4,198	67.59%	16
Mike Huckabee	1,020	16.42%	0
Ron Paul	494	7.95%	0
Mitt Romney	398	6.41%	0
Rudy Giuliani	101	1.63%	0
Total	6,211	100.00%	16

=== Maryland primary ===
Primary date: February 12, 2008
National delegates: 37

County results of the Maryland Republican primary. John McCain

The Maryland primary was a winner-take-all contest with 37 delegates pledged to the winner statewide.

2008 Maryland Republican presidential primary
Candidate	Votes	Percentage	National delegates
John McCain	176,046	54.84%	37
Mike Huckabee	91,608	28.54%	0
Mitt Romney	22,426	6.99%	0
Ron Paul	19,196	5.98%	0
Rudy Giuliani	4,548	1.42%	0
Alan Keyes	3,386	1.05%	0
Fred Thompson	2,901	0.90%	0
Duncan Hunter	522	0.16%	0
Tom Tancredo	356	0.11%	0
Total	320,989	100.00%	37

=== Virginia primary ===
Primary date: February 12, 2008
National delegates: 63

County results of the Virginia Republican primary. John McCain Mike Huckabee

The Virginia primary was a winner-take-all contest with 63 delegates pledged to the winner statewide.

2008 Virginia Republican presidential primary
Candidate	Votes	Percentage	National delegates
John McCain	244,829	50.04%	63
Mike Huckabee	199,003	40.67%	0
Ron Paul	21,999	4.50%	0
Mitt Romney	18,002	3.68%	0
Fred Thompson	3,395	0.69%	0
Rudy Giuliani	2,024	0.41%	0
Total	489,252	100.00%	63

=== Washington primary ===
Primary date: February 19, 2008
National delegates: 19 (of 40)

County results of the Washington Republican primary. John McCain

18 other unpledged delegates were selected at the state convention following caucuses on February 9, 2008. Delegates were allocated to the winner in each congressional district and proportionally to all candidates that received at least 20% of the vote statewide. The national committeeman, the national committeewoman, and the chairman of the Washington State Republican Party attended the convention as unpledged delegates.

2008 Washington Republican presidential primary
Candidate	Votes	Percentage	National delegates
John McCain	262,304	49.50%	16
Mike Huckabee	127,657	24.09%	3
Mitt Romney	86,140	16.25%	0
Ron Paul	40,539	7.65%	0
Rudy Giuliani	5,145	0.97%	0
Fred Thompson	4,865	0.92%	0
Alan Keyes	2,226	0.42%	0
Duncan Hunter	1,056	0.20%	0
Total	529,932	100.00%	0

=== Wisconsin primary ===
Primary date: February 19, 2008
National delegates: 40

County results of the Wisconsin Republican primary. John McCain Mike Huckabee

Delegates were allocated to the winner in each congressional district in the state and to the winner statewide.

2008 Wisconsin Republican presidential primary
Candidate	Votes	Percentage	National delegates
John McCain	224,755	54.74%	34
Mike Huckabee	151,707	36.95%	6
Ron Paul	19,090	4.65%	0
Mitt Romney	8,080	1.97%	0
Fred Thompson	2,709	0.66%	0
Rudy Giuliani	1,935	0.47%	0
Uncommitted	850	0.21%	0
Duncan Hunter	799	0.19%	0
Write-in candidates	497	0.12%	0
Tom Tancredo	185	0.05%	0
Total	410,607	100.00%	40

=== American Samoa caucuses ===
Caucus date: February 23, 2008
National delegates: 6 (of 9)

Six delegates were selected at a territorial party meeting. The national committeeman, the national committeewoman, and the chairman of the Republican Party of American Samoa also attended the convention as unpledged delegates. John McCain won the support of all nine delegates at the territorial meeting.

=== Northern Mariana Islands caucuses ===
Convention date: February 23, 2008
National delegates: 6 (of 9)

Six delegates were selected at a territorial party meeting. The national committeeman, the national committeewoman, and the chairman of the CNMI Republican Party also attended the convention as unpledged delegates. John McCain won the support of all nine delegates at the territorial meeting.

2008 Northern Mariana Islands Republican presidential caucuses
Candidate	Votes	Percentage	National delegates
John McCain	105	91.30%	6
Mike Huckabee	5	4.38%	0
Ron Paul	5	4.38%	0
Total	115	100.00%	6

=== Puerto Rico caucuses ===
Caucus date: February 24, 2008
National delegates: 20 (of 23)

Twenty delegates were pledged at the territorial caucus. The national committeeman, the national committeewoman, and the chairman of the Republican Party of Puerto Rico also attended the convention as unpledged delegates. Following the caucus, it was reported that McCain had the support of all 23 delegates.

2008 Puerto Rico Republican presidential caucuses
Candidate	Votes	Percentage	National delegates
John McCain	188	90.38%	20
Mike Huckabee	10	4.80%	0
Ron Paul	9	4.32%	0
Write-in candidates	1	0.48%	0
Total	208	100.00%	20

=== Ohio primary ===
Primary date: March 4, 2008
National delegates: 85 (of 88)

County results of the Ohio Republican primary. John McCain

Delegates were allocated to the winner in each congressional district in the state and to the winner statewide. The national committeeman, the national committeewoman, and the chairman of the Ohio Republican Party attended the convention as unpledged delegates.

2008 Ohio Republican presidential primary
Candidate	Votes	Percentage	National delegates
John McCain	656,687	60.03%	85
Mike Huckabee	335,356	30.65%	0
Ron Paul	49,027	4.48%	0
Mitt Romney	36,031	3.29%	0
Fred Thompson	16,879	1.54%	0
Total	1,093,980	100.00%	85

=== Rhode Island primary ===
Primary date: March 4, 2008
National delegates: 17 (of 20)

County results of the Rhode Island Republican primary. John McCain

Delegates were allocated proportionally to candidates that received at least 15% of the vote statewide. The national committeeman, the national committeewoman, and the chairman of the Rhode Island Republican Party attended the convention as unpledged delegates.

2008 Rhode Island Republican presidential primary
Candidate	Votes	Percentage	National delegates
John McCain	17,480	64.75%	13
Mike Huckabee	5,847	21.66%	4
Ron Paul	1,777	6.58%	0
Mitt Romney	1,181	4.37%	0
Uncommitted	570	2.11%	0
Alan Keyes	117	0.43%	0
Hugh Cort	24	0.09%	0
Total	26,996	100.00%	17

=== Texas primary ===
Primary date: March 4, 2008
National delegates: 137 (of 140)

County results of the Texas Republican primary. John McCain Mike Huckabee

Delegates were allocated to the winner in each congressional district if that candidate received at least 50% of the vote, or to the winner and runner-up if they received less. Delegates were also allocated to the statewide winner. The national committeeman, the national committeewoman, and the chairman of the Republican Party of Texas attended the convention as unpledged delegates.

2008 Texas Republican presidential primary
Candidate	Votes	Percentage	National delegates
John McCain	697,767	51.22%	120
Mike Huckabee	518,002	38.02%	17
Ron Paul	66,360	4.87%	0
Mitt Romney	27,264	2.00%	0
Uncommitted	17,574	1.29%	0
Fred Thompson	11,503	0.84%	0
Alan Keyes	8,260	0.61%	0
Duncan Hunter	8,222	0.60%	0
Rudy Giuliani	6,038	0.44%	0
Hugh Cort	728	0.05%	0
Hoa Tran	604	0.04%	0
Total	1,362,322	100.00%	137

=== Vermont primary ===
Primary date: March 4, 2008
National delegates: 17

Municipality results of the Vermont Republican primary. John McCain Mike Huckabee

The Vermont primary was a winner-take-all contest with 17 delegates pledged to the winner statewide.

2008 Vermont Republican presidential primary
Candidate	Votes	Percentage	National delegates
John McCain	28,417	71.32%	17
Mike Huckabee	5,698	14.30%	0
Ron Paul	2,635	6.61%	0
Mitt Romney	1,809	4.54%	0
Rudy Giuliani	931	2.34%	0
Write-in candidates	353	0.89%	0
Total	39,843	100.00%	17

=== Guam caucuses ===
Caucus date: March 8, 2008
National delegates: 6 (of 9)

Six delegates were selected at a territorial party meeting. The national committeeman, the national committeewoman, and the chairman of the Republican Party of Guam also attended the convention as unpledged delegates. John McCain won the support of all nine delegates at the territorial meeting.

=== Mississippi primary ===
Primary date: March 11, 2008
National delegates: 36 (of 39)

County results of the Mississippi Republican primary. John McCain

Delegates were allocated to the winner in each congressional district in the state and to the winner statewide. The national committeeman, the national committeewoman, and the chairman of the Mississippi Republican Party attended the convention as unpledged delegates.

2008 Mississippi Republican presidential primary
Candidate	Votes	Percentage	National delegates
John McCain	113,074	78.91%	36
Mike Huckabee	17,943	12.52%	0
Ron Paul	5,510	3.85%	0
Mitt Romney	2,177	1.52%	0
Fred Thompson	2,160	1.51%	0
Rudy Giuliani	945	0.66%	0
Alan Keyes	842	0.59%	0
Duncan Hunter	414	0.29%	0
Tom Tancredo	221	0.15%	0
Total	143,286	100.00%	36

=== United States Virgin Islands caucuses ===
Caucus date: April 5, 2008
National delegates: 6 (of 9)

Six delegates were selected at a territorial party meeting. The national committeeman, the national committeewoman, and the chairman of the Republican Party of the Virgin Islands also attended the convention as unpledged delegates.

2008 United States Virgin Islands Republican Territorial Meeting
Candidate	Votes	Percentage	National delegates
Uncommitted	153	47.22%	6
John McCain	102	31.48%	0
Mitt Romney	60	18.52%	0
Ron Paul	9	2.78%	0
Total	324	100	6

=== Pennsylvania primary ===
Primary date: April 22, 2008
National delegates: 61 (of 74)

County results of the Pennsylvania Republican primary. John McCain

All delegates elected in the Pennsylvania were officially unpledged. Ten additional unpledged delegates were selected by the Republican State Committee of Pennsylvania on June 6, 2008. The national committeeman, the national committeewoman, and the chairman of the Pennsylvania Republican Party also attended the convention as unpledged delegates.

2008 Pennsylvania Republican presidential primary
Candidate	Votes	Percentage	National delegates
John McCain	595,175	72.86%	0
Ron Paul	129,323	15.83%	0
Mike Huckabee	92,430	11.31%	0
Uncommitted	-	0.00%	61
Total	816,928	100%	61

=== Indiana primary ===
County results of the Indiana Republican primary. John McCain

Primary date: May 6, 2008
National delegates: 27 (of 57)

Delegates were allocated to the winner in each congressional district. 27 other unpledged delegates were selected during the state convention on June 9–10, 2008. The national committeeman, national committeewoman, and chairman of the Indiana Republican Party also attended the national convention as unpledged delegates.

2008 Indiana Republican presidential primary
Candidate	Votes	Percentage	National delegates
John McCain	320,318	77.62%	27
Mike Huckabee	41,173	9.98%	0
Ron Paul	31,612	7.66%	0
Mitt Romney	19,581	4.74%	0
Total	412,684	100.00%	27

=== North Carolina primary ===
Primary date: May 6, 2008
National delegates: 69

County results of the North Carolina Republican primary. John McCain

Delegates were allocated proportionally based on the results statewide.

2008 North Carolina Republican presidential primary
Candidate	Votes	Percentage	National delegates
John McCain	383,085	74.01%	53
Mike Huckabee	63,018	12.18%	9
Ron Paul	37,260	7.20%	5
Mitt Romney	20,624	3.98%	2
Alan Keyes	13,596	2.63%	0
Total	517,583	100.00%	69

=== Nebraska primary ===
Primary date: May 13, 2008
National delegates: 0 (of 33)

County results of the Nebraska Republican primary. John McCain

Nebraska's primary was nonbinding. 30 unpledged delegates were selected at the state convention on July 12, 2008. The national committeeman, national committeewoman, and chairman of the Nebraska Republican Party also attended the national convention as unpledged delegates.

2008 Nebraska Republican presidential primary
Candidate	Votes	Percentage	National delegates
John McCain	118,876	86.99%	0
Ron Paul	17,772	13.01%	0
Total	136,648	100.00%	0

=== West Virginia primary ===
Primary date: May 13, 2008
National delegates: 9 (of 30)

County results of the West Virginia Republican primary. John McCain

18 other delegates were selected during a state convention on February 5, 2008. The national committeeman, national committeewoman, and chairman of the West Virginia Republican Party also attended the national convention as unpledged delegates.

2008 West Virginia Republican presidential primary
Candidate	Votes	Percentage	National delegates
John McCain	90,469	76.00%	9
Mike Huckabee	12,310	10.34%	0
Ron Paul	5,969	5.01%	0
Mitt Romney	5,242	4.40%	0
Rudy Giuliani	2,875	2.42%	0
Alan Keyes	1,441	1.21%	0
Jerry Curry	728	0.61%	0
Total	119,034	100.00%	9

=== Kentucky primary ===
Primary date: May 20, 2008
National delegates: 42 (of 45)

County results of the Kentucky Republican primary. John McCain

Delegates were allocated proportionally to all candidates receiving at least 15% of the vote statewide. The national committeeman, the national committeewoman, and the chairman of the Republican Party of Kentucky attended the convention as unpledged delegates.

2008 Kentucky Republican presidential primary
Candidate	Votes	Percentage	National delegates
John McCain	142,918	72.26%	42
Mike Huckabee	16,388	8.29%	0
Ron Paul	13,427	6.79%	0
Mitt Romney	9,206	4.65%	0
Rudy Giuliani	3,055	1.54%	0
Alan Keyes	2,044	1.03%	0
Total	197,793	100.00%	42

=== Oregon primary ===
Primary date: May 20, 2008
National delegates: 27 (of 30)

County results of the Oregon Republican primary. John McCain

Delegates were allocated proportionally to all candidates receiving at least 3.5% of the vote statewide. The national committeeman, the national committeewoman, and the chairman of the Oregon Republican Party attended the convention as unpledged delegates.

2008 Oregon Republican presidential primary
Candidate	Votes	Percentage	National delegates
John McCain	285,881	80.88%	23
Ron Paul	51,100	14.46%	4
Write-in candidates	16,495	4.67%	0
Total	353,476	100.00%	27

=== Idaho primary ===
Primary date: May 27, 2008
National delegates: 24 (of 32)

County results of the Idaho Republican primary. John McCain

Delegates were allocated proportionally to candidates that received at least 5% of the vote statewide. Five other unpledged delegates were selected at the Idaho state convention on June 12–14, 2008. The national committeeman, the national committeewoman, and the chairman of the Idaho Republican Party also attended the national convention as unpledged delegates.

2008 Idaho Republican presidential primary
Candidate	Votes	Percentage	Delegates
John McCain	87,460	69.65%	17
Ron Paul	29,785	23.72%	6
None of the names shown	8,325	6.63%	1
Total	125,570	100.00%	24

=== Montana primary ===
Primary date: June 3, 2008
National delegates: 0 (of 25)

Montana's primary was nonbinding. All 25 delegates were pledged during the caucuses on February 5, 2008.

2008 Montana Republican presidential primary
Candidate	Votes	Percentage	National delegates
John McCain	72,791	76.04%	0
Ron Paul	20,606	21.53%	0
No preference	2,333	2.44%	0
Total	95,730	100.00%	0

=== New Mexico primary ===
Primary date: June 3, 2008
National delegates: 29 (of 32)

County results of the New Mexico Republican primary. John McCain

Delegates were allocated proportionally to candidates that received at least 15% of the vote statewide. The national committeeman, the national committeewoman, and the chairman of the Republican Party of New Mexico attended the convention as unpledged delegates.

2008 New Mexico Republican presidential primary
Candidate	Votes	Percentage	National delegates
John McCain	95,378	85.97%	29
Ron Paul	15,561	14.03%	0
Total	110,939	100.00%	29

=== South Dakota primary ===
Primary date: June 3, 2008
National delegates: 24 (of 27)

County results of the New Mexico Republican primary. John McCain

Delegates were allocated proportionally to candidates that received at least 20% of the vote statewide. The national committeeman, the national committeewoman, and the chairman of the South Dakota Republican Party attended the convention as unpledged delegates.

2008 South Dakota Republican presidential primary
Candidate	Votes	Percentage	National delegates
John McCain	42,788	70.19%	24
Ron Paul	10,072	16.52%	0
Mike Huckabee	4,328	7.10%	0
Mitt Romney	1,990	3.26%	0
Uncommitted	1,786	2.93%	0
Total	60,964	100.00%	24

== See also ==
- Results of the 2008 Democratic Party presidential primaries
- Super Tuesday (2008)
