= Results of the 2008 presidential primaries =

The Results of the 2008 presidential primaries are subdivided into:

- Results of the 2008 Democratic Party presidential primaries
- Results of the 2008 Republican Party presidential primaries
