= 2008 U.S. Virgin Islands Democratic presidential convention =

- February 9, 2008

Candidate	Barack Obama	Hillary Clinton
Home state	Illinois	New York
Delegate count	3	0
Popular vote	1,772	149
Percentage	89.95%	7.56%

The 2008 U.S. Virgin Islands Democratic presidential convention took place on February 9, 2008. The convention chose 6 delegates, all pledged to Senator Barack Obama. Each delegate, however, only counted for half a vote at the 2008 Democratic National Convention. The Virgin Islands' delegation also included 6 unpledged "superdelegates" not bound by the results of the convention.

== Results ==
United States Virgin Islands Democratic presidential territorial convention, 2008
Candidate	Votes	Percentage	Delegate votes
Barack Obama	1,820	90.1%	3
Hillary Clinton	150	7.4%	0
Uncommitted	50	2.5%	0
Totals	2,020	100.00%	3

== See also ==
- Democratic Party (United States) presidential primaries, 2008
- United States Virgin Islands Republican caucuses, 2008
