= 2008 Montana Democratic presidential primary =

- June 3, 2008

25 Democratic National Convention delegates (16 pledged, 9 unpledged)

Candidate	Barack Obama	Hillary Clinton
Party	Democratic	Democratic
Home state	Illinois	New York
Delegate count	9	7
Popular vote	103,174	74,889
Percentage	56.56%	41.05%
- Primary results by county Clinton: 40–50% 50–60% Obama: 50–60% 60–70% 70–80%

The 2008 Montana Democratic presidential primary took place on June 3, 2008, with 16 delegates at stake. Along with South Dakota, it was one of the last two elections in the 2008 Democratic Party Presidential Primary. The winner in Montana's at-large congressional district was awarded all of that district's delegates, which totaled 10 (the district was split into Western and Eastern halves). Another six delegates were awarded to the statewide winner, Barack Obama. The 16 delegates represented Montana at the Democratic National Convention in Denver, Colorado. Eight other unpledged delegates, known as superdelegates, also attended the convention.

At the same time as he lost the South Dakota Democratic Primary, Barack Obama won the Montana Democratic Primary and simultaneously secured enough delegates to clinch the Democratic Party's nomination for President over Hillary Clinton.

== Turnout ==
According to the Secretary of State of Montana, at the time of the primary, Montana had 630,658 registered voters from a 2007 population of 957,861 in 56 counties. Turnout was estimated to be at 28.80 percent.

== Results ==
Early on the day of the primary, hours before polls closed, the Associated Press projected Barack Obama's nomination for the presidency. The projection was based on the declarations of a large number of Democratic superdelegates, as well as exit polls of voters in South Dakota and Montana. However, the AP calculated that Obama would be the presumptive Democratic nominee even if he lost the primaries in both South Dakota and Montana simply because he was so far ahead in the delegate count.

2008 Montana Democratic Presidential Primary Results
Party	Candidate	Votes	Percentage	Delegates
Democratic	Barack Obama	103,174	56.56%	9
Democratic	Hillary Clinton	74,889	41.05%	7
Democratic	Uncommitted	4,358	2.39%	0
Totals		182,421	100.00%	16
Voter turnout		28.80%		—

== Analysis ==
Like many Western states, Montana was handily won by Barack Obama, although Hillary Clinton did considerably better here than in many other states in the area. According to exit polls, 91 percent of voters in the Montana Democratic Primary were Caucasians and they opted for Obama by a margin of 56-41 percent. Obama swept all age groups, socioeconomic classes and educational attainment ladders except senior citizens ages 65 and over who supported Clinton by a margin of 57–40. Obama won all ideological groups and voters from both major parties as well as Independents. Regarding religion, Clinton won Protestants by a margin of 52-45 while Obama won Roman Catholics by a margin of 52–46, other Christians by a margin of 56–41, and atheists/agnostics by a margin of 75–24.

Obama did well all throughout the state of Montana. His best performance was in Big Horn County which contains Native American reservations, where he received 78.09 percent, and Gallatin County, which contains Bozeman, the home of Montana State University. He was able to rack up the numbers by winning the more populous counties of Yellowstone County, which contains Billings, as well as Missoula County which contains left-leaning Missoula. Clinton performed best in some of the lesser populated and far more conservative rural counties in Eastern Montana, but also performed strongly in Silver Bow County, which contains Butte, as well as Deer Lodge County which contains Anaconda.

== See also ==
- 2008 Democratic Party presidential primaries
- 2008 Montana Republican presidential caucuses and primary
