= Colorado caucuses =

Electoral process for some offices in Colorado, U.S.

The Colorado caucuses were an electoral process used in Colorado to appoint candidates for certain political offices and start the process of electing new leaders for political party leadership. They took the form of a series of precinct caucuses, meetings of registered electors within a precinct who are members of a particular major political party. The purpose of precinct caucuses was to elect precinct committee persons and delegates to county assemblies, including those that elected delegates to the presidential nominating conventions. The caucus system was abolished by the passing of Proposition 107 in 2016.

== History ==
The Colorado legislature adopted the caucus system in a special session called by Governor John F. Shafroth in August 1910 as part of a package of progressive reforms. It was seen as a way to limit the power of party bosses and to attract more grassroots involvement. The caucus system was abolished in favor of presidential primaries in 1992 but restored in 2002 with the defeat of Amendment 29 and cost considerations. The fully restored Colorado Caucus was in 2004.

== Strengths and weaknesses ==
Research carried out in Iowa indicates that a well-designed caucus system "brings candidates’ arguments, strengths, and weaknesses into the open". However, it has recently been claimed that the system "is a poor way to begin the party nominating process in Colorado", in that it "is complicated and often disenfranchises all but the most politically motivated participants." Others feel that the Colorado Caucus is the best tool for the common person, the average, ordinary citizen, to serve in elected public office. The late Sue O'Brien, Editorial Page Editor of the Denver Post, whom some called "the conscience of Colorado," was particularly fond of the Colorado Caucus because it creates repeated opportunities for average, ordinary people to take the first steps toward becoming political leaders.

== Regulation ==
Over 3,000 caucuses are held in neighborhoods across Colorado. They are open to the public. Some now meet in homes accessible to disabled people, but many meet in public spaces such as schools.

The Colorado Secretary of State is charged with the responsibility of providing information about the system. Caucuses are regulated by Colorado law, but expenses for them are paid by the major political parties that use the system. Only the Republican Party and the Democratic Party have enough registered voters to use the caucus-assembly system.

== 2016 caucuses ==
On March 1, 2016 (Super Tuesday), each of the two major parties (determined by a number of votes in the previous election) held a caucus in each precinct. Members of both the Democratic and Republican parties chose delegates to represent their precincts at the county conventions. Additionally, Democratic party members participated in a presidential preference poll which determined the allocation of delegates based on their stated intent to vote for a given presidential candidate. Regardless of party, delegates are bound neither to their stated intent nor to the preference given by the population they were chosen by. On the weekend before March 1 caucuses, both major political parties had state chairs who unilaterally announced they wanted to see an end to the Colorado Caucus, the system that had been entrusted to their care. Partly as a result of poor leadership, the Colorado Caucus this year was chaotic.

== Propositions 107 and 108 ==
Widespread support for 2016 presidential candidate Bernie Sanders created chaos in the 2016 Colorado presidential primary caucuses, which were unprepared for the influx of first-time participants. Propositions 107 and 108 were proposed (and ultimately passed) in 2016 in large part as a response to this chaos.

Proposition 107 was passed on November 8, 2016, in Colorado with 1,701,599 votes for (64.09%) and 953,246 votes against (35.91%), resulting in a Yes vote intended to restore presidential primary elections held before the end of March and make them open in Colorado.

Proposition 108 was passed on November 8, 2016, in Colorado with 1,398,577 votes for (53.27%) and 1,227,117 votes against (46.73%), resulting in a Yes vote to allow unaffiliated electors to vote in the primary election of a major political party without declaring an affiliation with that political party and to permit a political party, in some circumstances, to select candidates by committee or convention, rather than through a primary election.

There was almost no organized opposition to these two measures, and as a result, they easily passed. Implementing them has proven to be difficult.

== See also ==
- Colorado Republican caucuses, 2008
- Colorado Democratic caucuses, 2008
- United States presidential election in Colorado, 2008
- United States presidential election in Colorado, 2012
- United States presidential election in Colorado, 2016
- Caucus
