= 2008 Minnesota Democratic presidential caucuses =

- February 5, 2008

88 Democratic National Convention delegates (78 pledged, 16 unpledged)

Candidate	Barack Obama	Hillary Clinton
Home state	Illinois	New York
Delegate count	48	24
Popular vote	142,109	68,994
Percentage	66.39%	32.23%
- Caucus results by county Obama: 40–50% 50–60% 60–70% 70–80% Clinton: 40–50% 50–60% 60–70%

The 2008 Minnesota Democratic presidential caucuses took place on Super Tuesday, February 5, 2008 with 78 delegates at stake. The winner in each of Minnesota's eight congressional districts was awarded all of that district's delegates, totaling 47. Another 25 delegates were awarded to the statewide winner, Barack Obama. The 72 delegates represented Minnesota at the Democratic National Convention in Denver, Colorado. Sixteen other unpledged delegates, known as superdelegates, also attended the convention and cast their votes as well.

== Candidates ==
- Hillary Clinton
- Mike Gravel
- Barack Obama

Candidates Joe Biden, Chris Dodd, Dennis Kucinich, Bill Richardson, and John Edwards dropped out of the presidential race before the Minnesota Democratic Caucus.

=== Money Raised from Minnesota ===
Candidate	Money raised (US$)
Joe Biden	$11,290
Hillary Clinton	$630,361
Chris Dodd	$63,130
John Edwards	$218,697
Mike Gravel	$500
Dennis Kucinich	$9,640
Barack Obama	$614,569
Bill Richardson	$82,094

== Process ==
Of the 88 delegates, 72 were allocated based on the results of the caucuses. Candidates were required to reach a threshold of 15 percent support at the precinct, congressional district, and statewide levels. Unlike other caucuses, there was no realignment of nonviable groups, and the results were binding for the delegates.

In 2008, there were more than 4,000 precinct caucus sites. Any Minnesotan who would be eligible to vote in the November general election, was not an active member of a party other than the Democratic-Farmer-Labor Party, and agreed with DFL party principles was allowed to participate. All participants, by signing in, affirmed their agreement with the DFL's principles. The caucus included a presidential preference primary, in which voters cast secret ballots for presidential candidates. These results were tallied and used to elect 47 delegates from each of the state's eight congressional districts as follows:

Congressional District	Pledged Delegates
1st	5
2nd	5
3rd	6
4th	7
5th	8
6th	5
7th	5
8th	6
Total	47

An additional 25 pledged delegates were then allocated based upon the statewide caucus vote. Sixteen of these delegates were allocated for Barack Obama while nine were allocated for Hillary Rodham Clinton.

The remaining 16 delegates were unpledged superdelegates. The 14 Democratic Party Leaders and Elected Officials (PLEOs) included seven Democratic National Committee members, six members of the United States Congress, and former Vice President Walter Mondale. There were also two unpledged add-on delegates, elected at the Minnesota Democratic-Farmer-Labor Party State Convention.

== Pre-Caucus Events, Predictions, and Polls ==
Polling showed a tightening race for the nomination.

Candidate	Sept. 18–23, 2007	Jan. 18–27, 2008
Hillary Clinton	47%	40%
Barack Obama	22%	33%
John Edwards	16%	12%

== Caucus Night ==
Minnesotans turned out in record numbers to attend the 2008 Democratic Caucuses in locations throughout the state. The previous record turnout was about 80,000 in 1968 or 1972; the 2008 turnout exceeded 214,000. As the caucus results came in, Barack Obama consistently held a two-to-one lead over Hillary Rodham Clinton with strong support all throughout the state. Turnout at the Democratic Caucuses was significantly higher than at the Minnesota Republican Caucuses that night.

Following the results of the Super Tuesday elections, U.S. Senator Amy Klobuchar endorsed Barack Obama.

== Results ==
2008 Minnesota Democratic Presidential Caucus Results
Party	Candidate	Votes	Percentage	Delegates
Democratic (DFL)	Barack Obama	142,109	66.39%	48
Democratic (DFL)	Hillary Clinton	68,994	32.23%	24
Democratic (DFL)	Uncommitted	1,312	0.61%	0
Democratic (DFL)	John Edwards	985	0.46%	0
Democratic (DFL)	Dennis Kucinich	361	0.17%	0
Democratic (DFL)	Joe Biden	129	0.06%	0
Democratic (DFL)	Bill Richardson	82	0.04%	0
Democratic (DFL)	Christopher Dodd	77	0.04%	0
Democratic (DFL)	Frank Lynch	17	0.01%	0
Totals		214,066	100.00%	72
Voter turnout		%		—

== See also ==
- 2008 Democratic Party presidential primaries
- 2008 Minnesota Republican presidential caucuses
