= 2008 Nevada Republican presidential caucuses =

- January 19, 2008
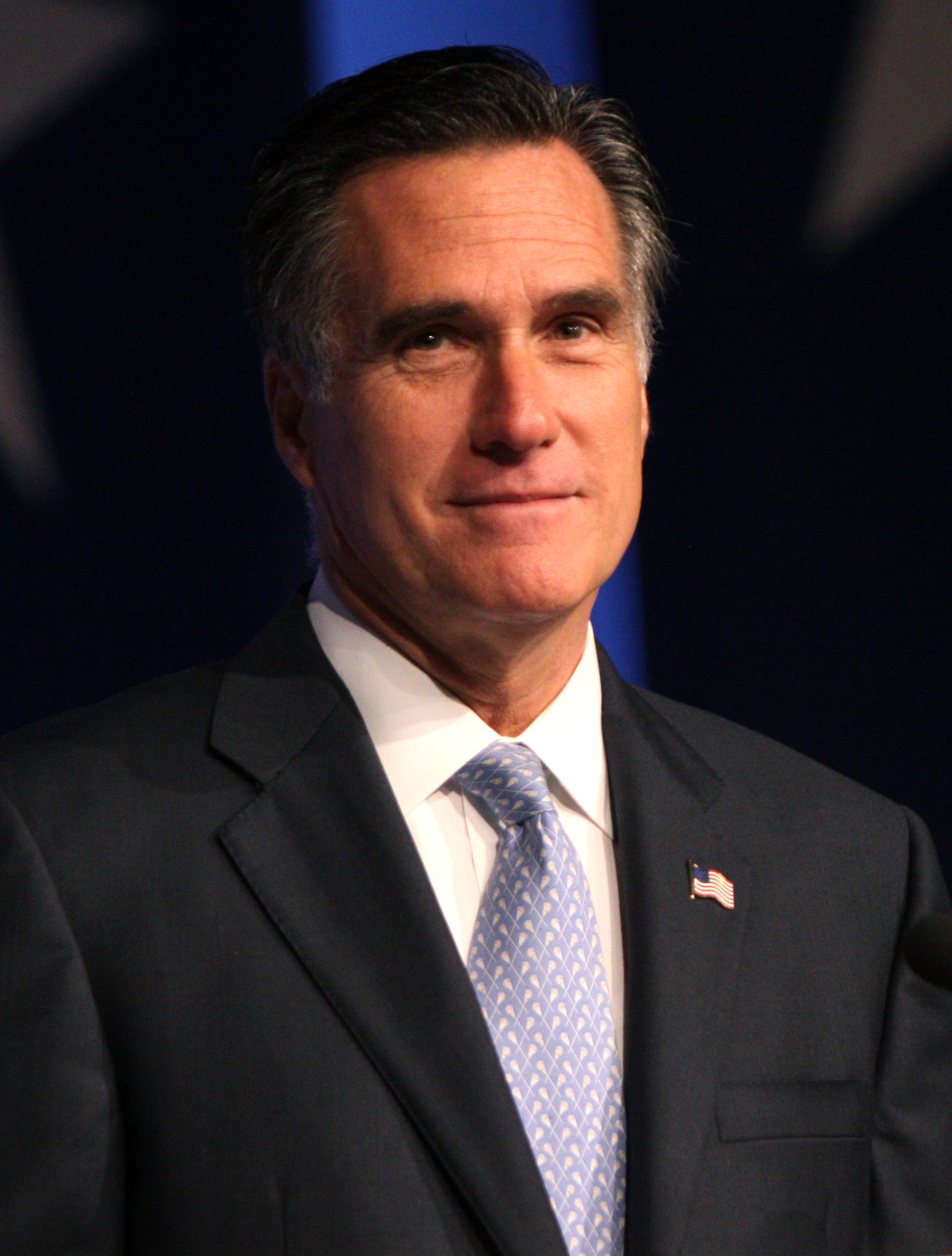

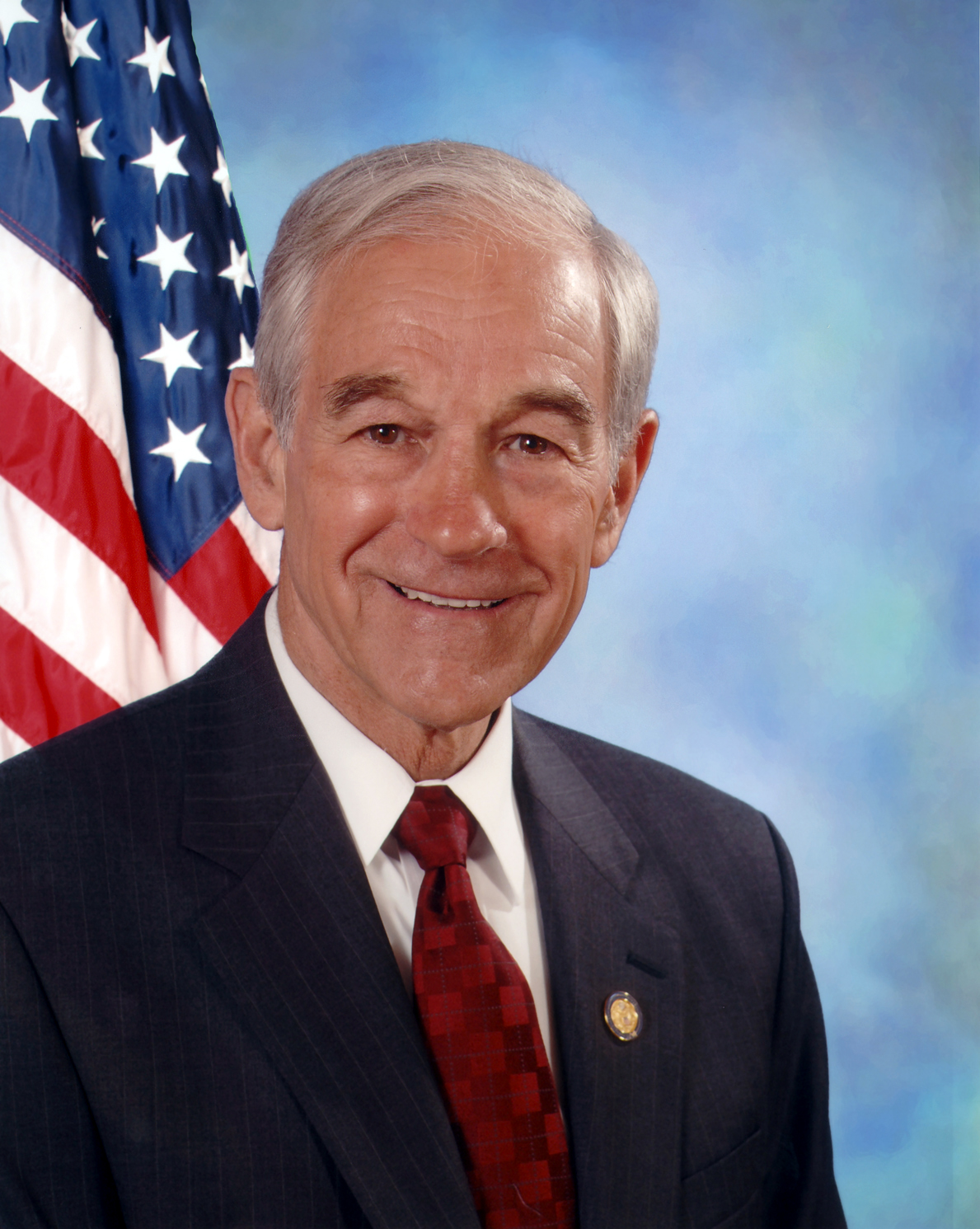

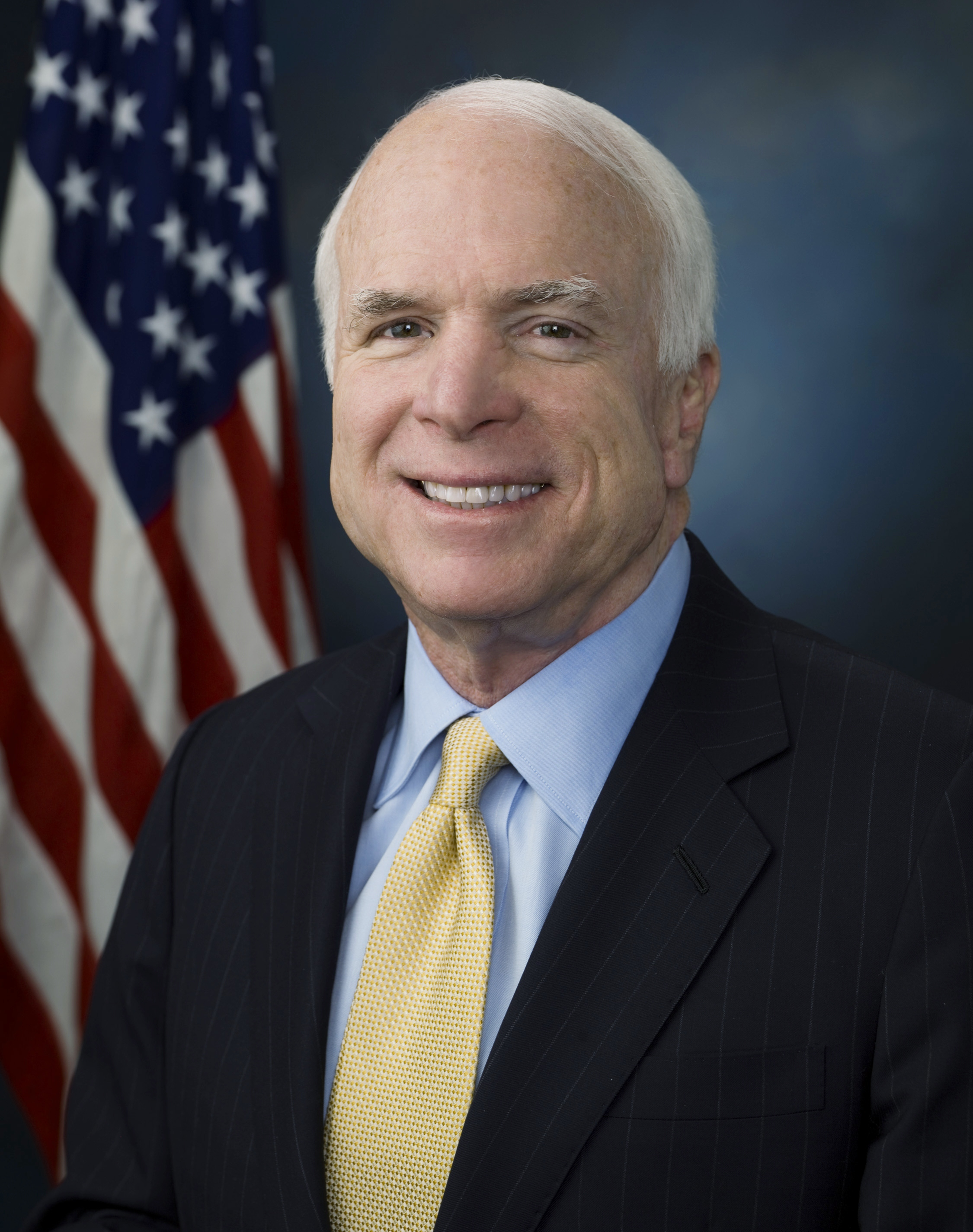

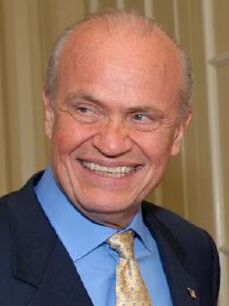
| Nominee | Mitt Romney | Ron Paul | John McCain |
| Party | Republican | Republican | Republican |
| Home state | Massachusetts | Texas | Arizona |
| Delegate count | 18 | 4 | 4 |
| Popular vote | 22,649 | 6,087 | 5,651 |
| Percentage | 51.1% | 13.73% | 12.75% |
| Nominee | Mike Huckabee | Fred Thompson |
| Party | Republican | Republican |
| Home state | Arkansas | Tennessee |
| Delegate count | 2 | 2 |
| Popular vote | 3,616 | 3,521 |
| Percentage | 8.16% | 7.94% |
- County results Mitt Romney Ron Paul

The 2008 Nevada Republican presidential caucuses was held on January 19, the same day as the 2008 South Carolina Republican primary, with 31 delegates at stake. Mitt Romney was the winner in Nevada with 51% of the votes, with Ron Paul in second place. Half of Romney's votes came from Mormons, while two-thirds of the independent voters favored Paul. According to the Las Vegas Sun, Republicans crossed over in large numbers to vote Democratic; CNN exit polls indicated that Republican voters made up 4% of the Democratic caucus turnout.

== Process ==
The Nevada Republican Party caucus was a closed caucus open to those who were registered 30 days before the caucus date, and 17-year-olds who were eligible to vote in the general election in November. As in most Republican caucuses, there were two components. First, precinct delegates were elected from the attendees. These delegates represented the caucusgoers at the county conventions in March, and generally announced who they support for president, and why they should go to the county convention. Election of delegates was by show of hands. Then, a supporter of each campaign spoke on behalf of their candidate. Finally, a straw poll, called a presidential preference poll, was taken of the individuals in the room. This preference poll was a secret ballot with candidate names printed on them.

Although the news media reported the results of the straw poll and proportionally assigned delegates to the Republican National Convention based on it, no delegates were selected at the caucus. Under Nevada Republican Party rules, the precinct delegates would convene at county conventions on March 15, from which a smaller group of delegates would be selected for a state convention on April 26. The state convention would select 31 of Nevada's delegates to the national convention.

== Campaign ==
Republican candidate Mitt Romney campaigned hard in Nevada, while the other leading Republican candidates, John McCain and Mike Huckabee, focused on South Carolina during the run-up to January 19. The Republican party did not cut Nevada's delegates to the national convention in half; therefore, Nevada had more delegates at stake than South Carolina. He was expected to benefit from Nevada's large Mormon population.

A poll ahead of the election predicted John McCain to win the election with 22 percent, followed by Rudy Giuliani (18 percent), Mike Huckabee (16 percent), Mitt Romney (15 percent), Fred Thompson (11 percent) and Ron Paul (6 percent).

On January 17, Ron Paul's Nevada campaign representatives warned state GOP officials that thousands of caucus goers had been given incorrect information on where to go to caucus. Party officials addressed the problem with a message on the Nevada GOP website that morning, two days before the caucus.

== Results ==
Romney's win in Nevada extended the lead that he then held in total delegates. After coming last in this caucus, Duncan Hunter withdrew his bid for the nomination.

Although delegates were not pledged to candidates until the state convention, the news media allocated delegates proportionally for reporting purposes.

100% of precincts reporting
| Candidate | Votes | Percentage | Delegates |
|---|---|---|---|
| Mitt Romney | 22,646 | 51.1% | 18 |
| Ron Paul | 6,084 | 13.73% | 4 |
| John McCain | 5,650 | 12.75% | 4 |
| Mike Huckabee | 3,616 | 8.16% | 2 |
| Fred Thompson | 3,519 | 7.94% | 2 |
| Rudy Giuliani | 1,910 | 4.31% | 1 |
| Duncan Hunter | 890 | 2.01% | 0 |
| Total | 44,315 | 100% | 31 (Note: There were 34 delegates in Nevada, but 3 of those delegates were unbound party leaders) |

Delegate selection to the national convention did not proceed as planned. By April 26, Romney had ended his campaign and endorsed McCain, hoping his supporters would do the same at the state convention. However, many delegates switched their support to Ron Paul instead. After Paul supporters successfully passed a rule change positioning themselves to send more Paul delegates to the national convention, the convention was recessed by its chairman, State Senator Bob Beers. The state convention failed to reconvene, and in July the twelve-member executive board of the Nevada Republican Party instead approved the slate of national delegates. All 34 voted for McCain at the national convention.

== See also ==
- Nevada Democratic caucuses, 2008
- Republican Party (United States) presidential primaries, 2008
