= 2008 Minnesota Republican presidential caucuses =

- February 5, 2008
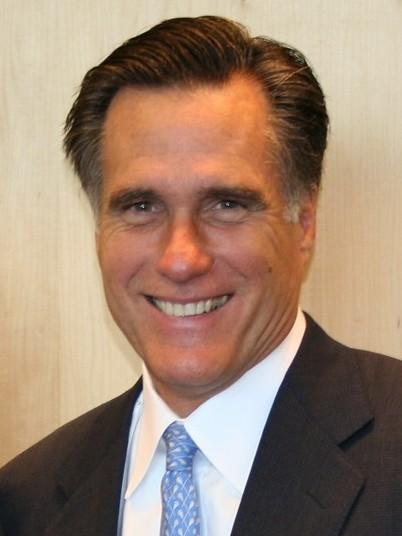

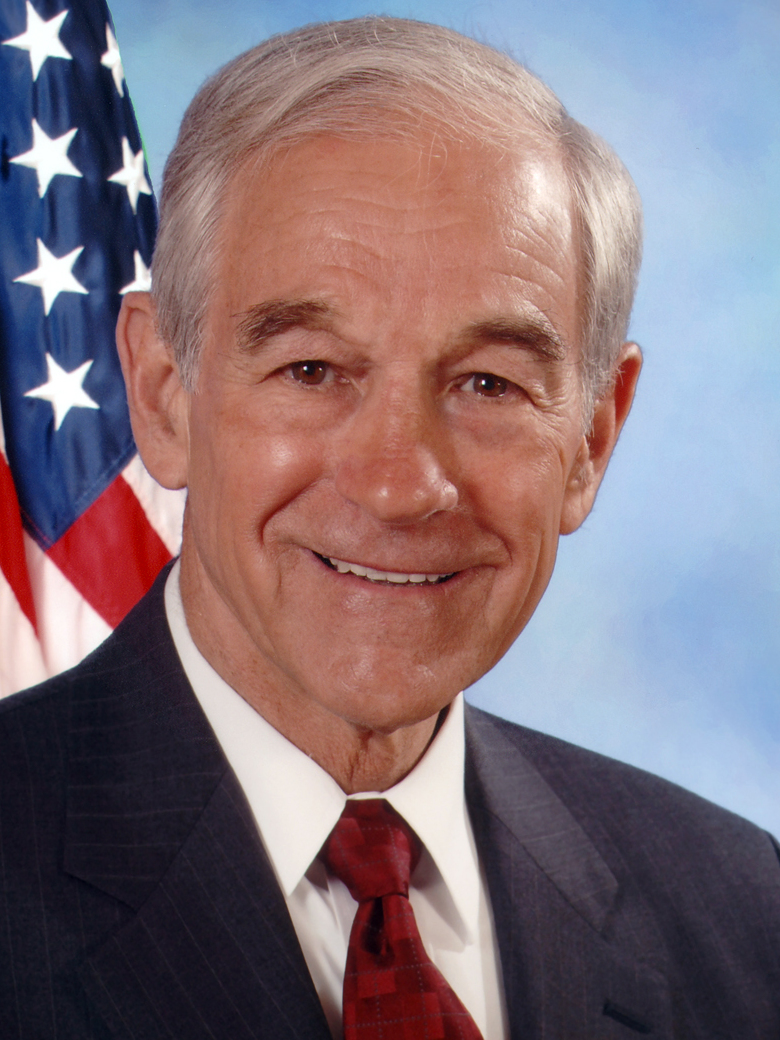
Candidate	Mitt Romney	John McCain
Home state	Massachusetts	Arizona
Delegate count	38	0
Popular vote	25,990	13,826
Percentage	41.37%	22.01%
Candidate	Mike Huckabee	Ron Paul
Home state	Arkansas	Texas
Delegate count	0	0
Popular vote	12,493	9,852
Percentage	19.88%	15.68%
- County results Mitt Romney John McCain Mike Huckabee Ron Paul Tie

The 2008 Minnesota Republican presidential caucuses took place on February 5, 2008, with 38 national delegates at stake. The caucuses were considered a non-binding straw poll, since the Republican Party of Minnesota officially chose 24 delegates to the 2008 Republican National Convention during district conventions from May 3 to May 24, 2008, and the remaining 14 delegates during the state convention on June 7, 2008. Those delegates to the national convention officially nominated the President. Mitt Romney was the winner of the Minnesota caucuses.

The 2008 Republican National Convention was held in St. Paul, Minnesota from September 1 until September 4, 2008.

== Results ==
100% of precincts reporting
Candidate	Votes	Percentage	Delegates
Mitt Romney	25,990	41.37%	38
John McCain	13,826	22.01%	0
Mike Huckabee	12,493	19.88%	0
Ron Paul	9,852	15.68%	0
Alan Keyes	368	0.59%	0
Total	62,828	100%	38

== See also ==
- 2008 Minnesota Democratic presidential caucuses
- 2008 Republican Party presidential primaries
