= 2008 Washington Republican presidential caucuses and primary =

- February 9, 2008 (caucus); February 19, 2008 (primary)
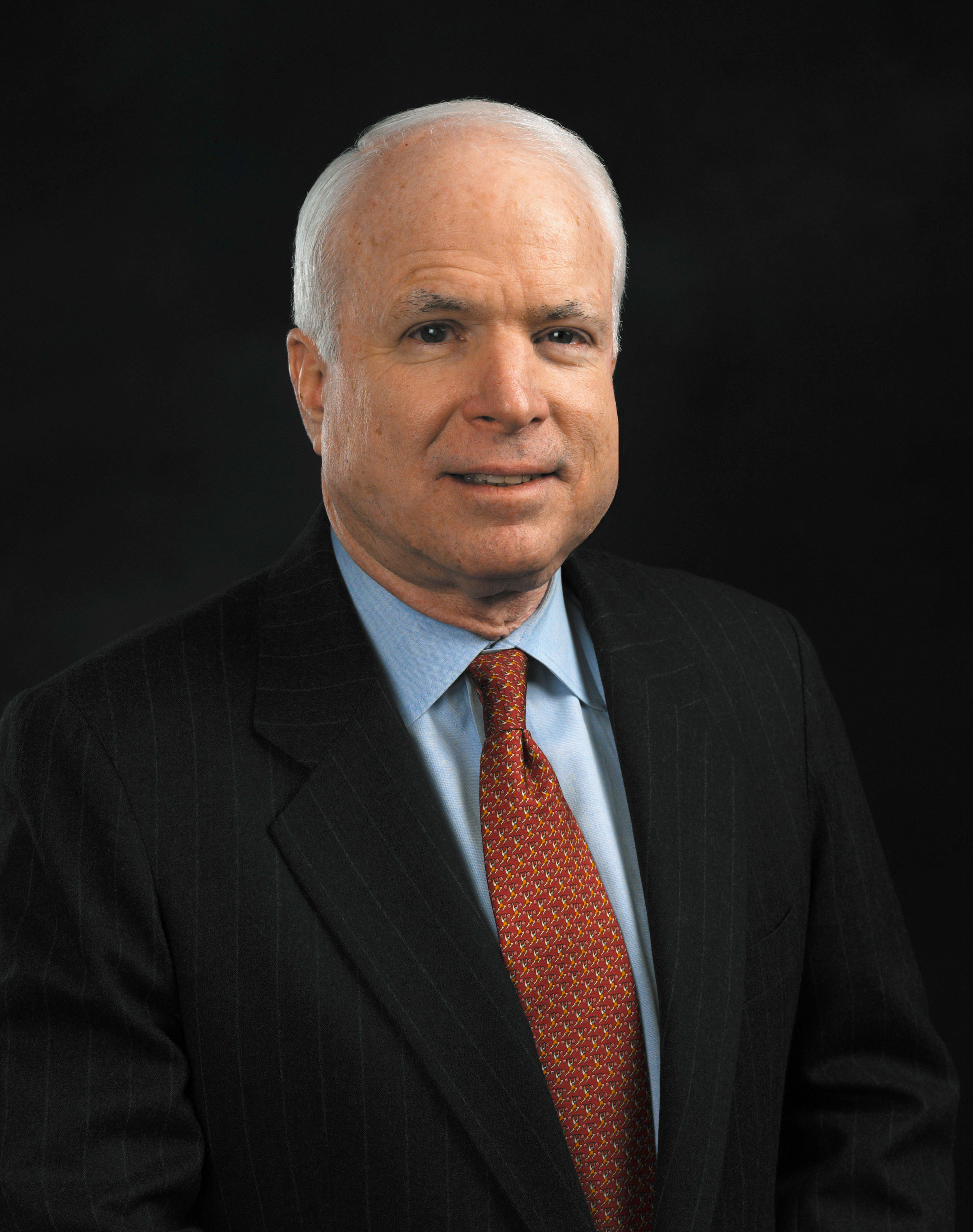

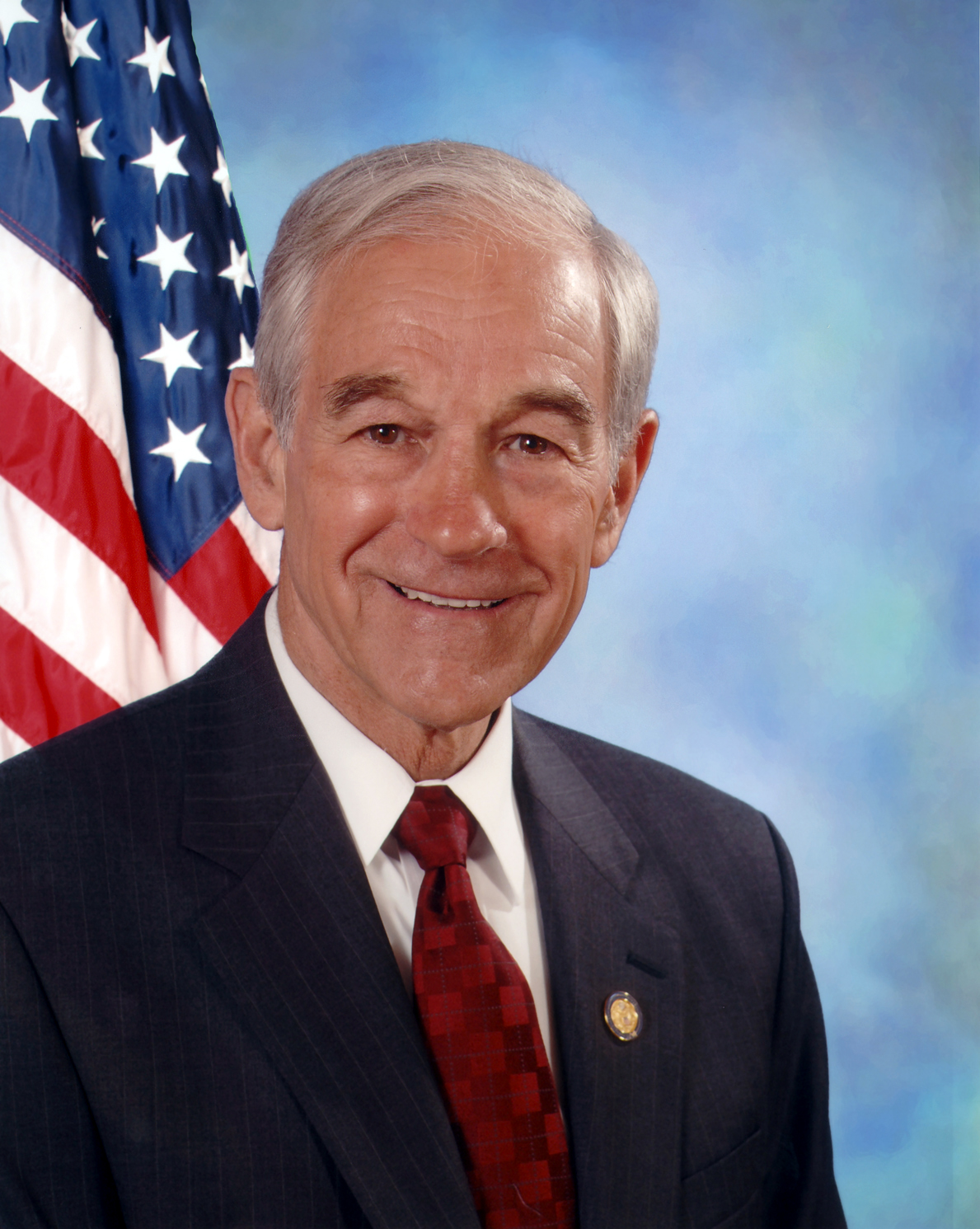

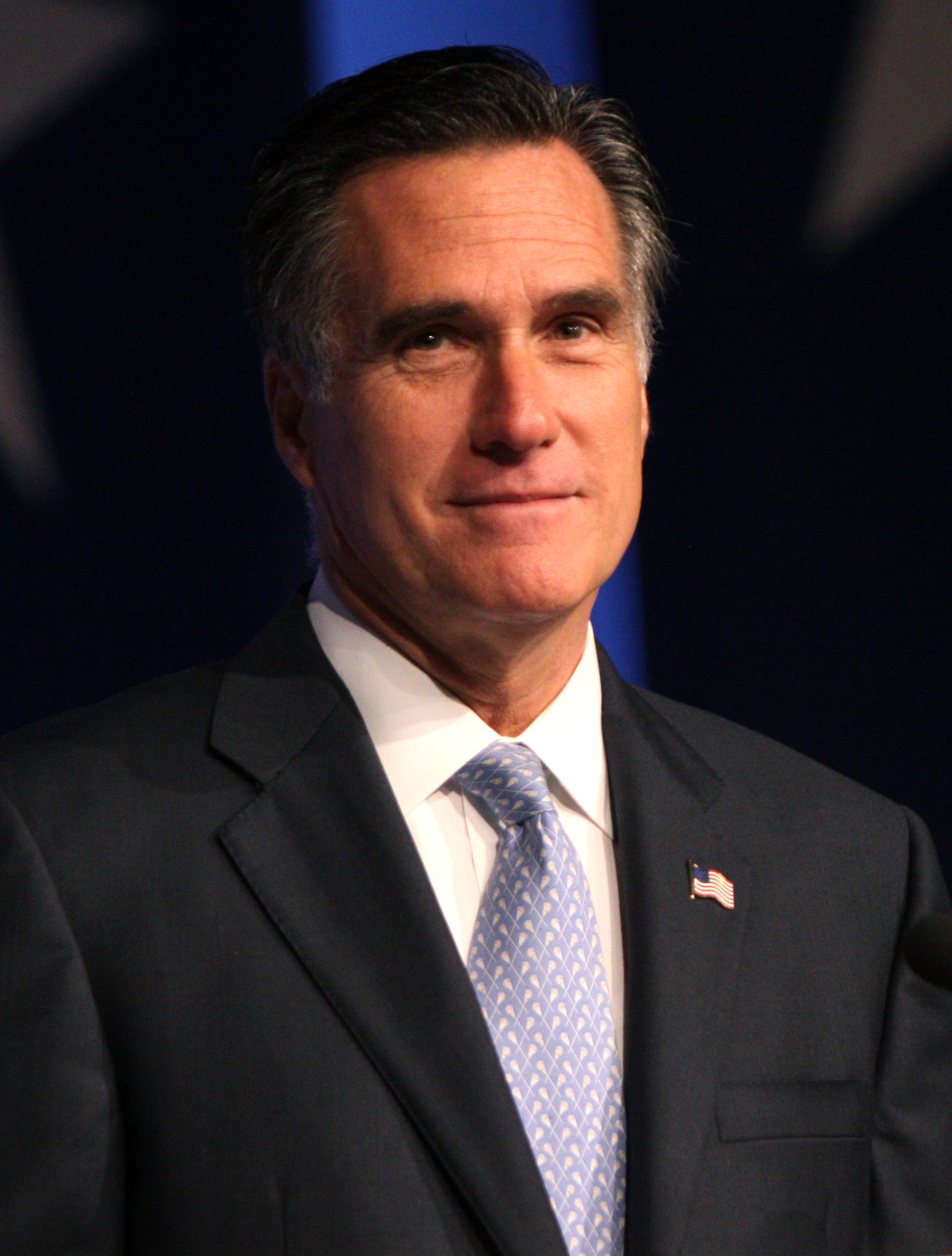
Candidate	John McCain	Mike Huckabee
Party	Republican	Republican
Home state	Arizona	Arkansas
Delegate count	16	8
Popular vote	3,228/262,304	2,959/127,657
Percentage	25.9%/49.50%	23.52%/24.09%
Candidate	Ron Paul	Mitt Romney
Party	Republican	Republican
Home state	Texas	Massachusetts
Delegate count	5	0
Popular vote	2,740/40,539	1,903/86,140
Percentage	21.64%/7.65%	15.45%/16.25%
- County results John McCain Mike Huckabee Ron Paul Mitt Romney Uncommitted

The 2008 Washington Republican presidential caucuses were held on Saturday February 9 and the primary on February 19, 2008 to compete 40 total delegates, of which 18 tied to the caucuses, 19 tied to the primary, and 3 unpledged RNC member delegates.

== Candidates ==
All following candidates appeared on the ballot for voters in Washington:

- Mike Huckabee
- John McCain
- Ron Paul
- Mitt Romney (candidate has suspended his campaign)

== Caucuses ==
Voting in Washington's caucuses closed at 9:00 pm EST February 9.

The Washington Republican Party declared John McCain the winner on the night of the election, after 87% of the votes were counted. Mike Huckabee disputed the results and accused the state party of calling the election prematurely. He demanded a state-wide caucus recount. However, by Tuesday, February 12, the Washington Republicans again declared McCain the winner after 96% of the votes were tallied, and never counted the rest of the votes.

96% of precincts reporting
Candidate	State Delegate	Percentage	Delegates	Counties Carries
John McCain	3,228	25.9%	16	11
Mike Huckabee	2,959	23.52%	8	11
Ron Paul	2,740	21.64%	5	9
Mitt Romney	1,903	15.45%	0	4
Uncommitted	1,662	13.49%	0	2
Total	12,320	100%	29	37

== Primary ==
The primary took place on February 19, 2008.

Official Results
Candidate	Votes	Percentage	Delegates
John McCain	262,304	49.50%	16
Mike Huckabee	127,657	24.09%	8
Mitt Romney*	86,140	16.25%	0
Ron Paul	40,539	7.65%	5
Rudy Giuliani*	5,145	0.97%	0
Fred Thompson*	4,865	0.92%	0
Alan Keyes	2,226	0.42%	0
Duncan Hunter*	799	0.19%	0
Total	529,932	100%	29

* Candidate stopped campaign before primary

== Money raised ==
The following table shows the amount of money each Republican Party candidate raised in the state of Washington.

Candidate	Money Raised
Mitt Romney	$689,329
Ron Paul	$531,471
John McCain	$308,074
Rudy Giuliani	$264,788
Fred Thompson	$81,208
Mike Huckabee	$81,208
Duncan Hunter	$15,378

== See also ==
- 2008 Republican Party presidential primaries
- 2008 Washington Democratic presidential caucuses
