= 2008 Montana Republican presidential caucuses and primary =

- February 5, 2008
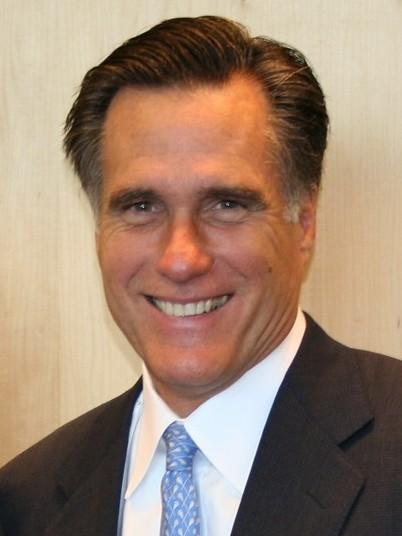

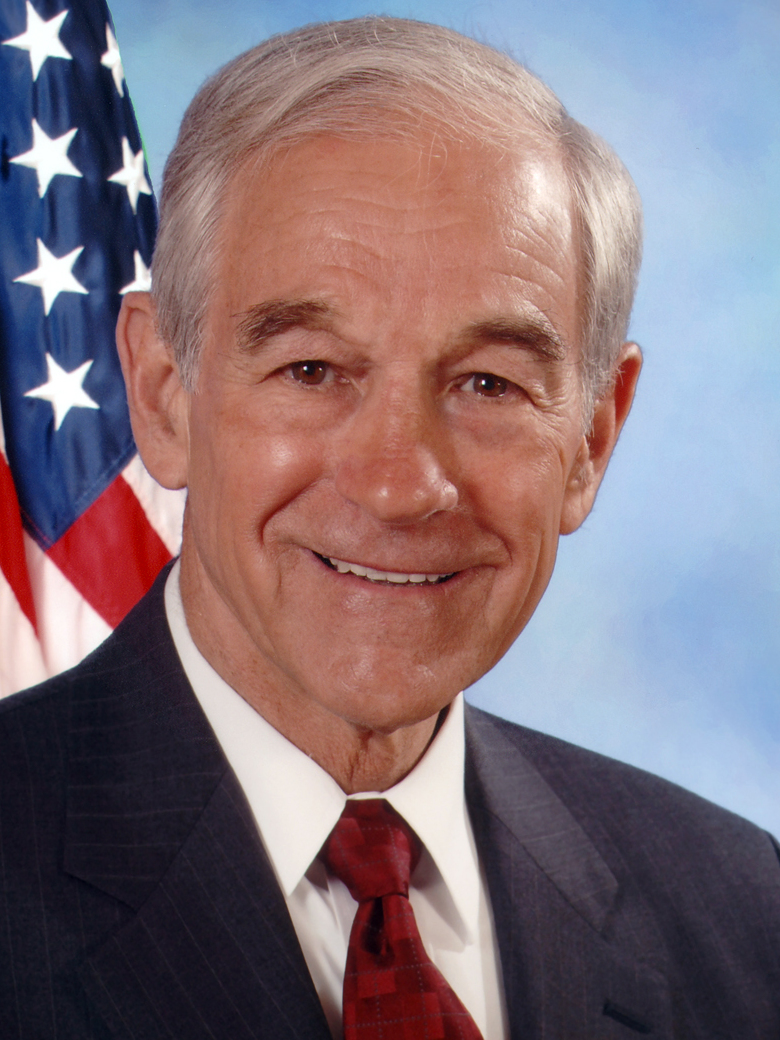

| Candidate | Mitt Romney | Ron Paul |
| Home state | Massachusetts | Texas |
| Popular vote | 625 | 400 |
| Percentage | 38.34% | 24.54% |
| Candidate | John McCain | Mike Huckabee |
| Home state | Arizona | Arkansas |
| Popular vote | 358 | 245 |
| Percentage | 21.96% | 15.03% |
- County results Mitt Romney Ron Paul John McCain Mike Huckabee Tie

The 2008 Montana Republican presidential caucuses took place on February 5, 2008, with 25 national delegates. The first caucuses were scheduled for midday in Sheridan County and Judith Basin County.

In the fall of 2007, Montana's Republican Party decided to create a caucus for Super Tuesday. They hoped to "boost the state's profile among the campaigns and energize the party." In spite of this change, only one presidential candidate actually visited Montana, Mitt Romney in June 2007. McCain, Romney, Huckabee and Paul each orchestrated last-minute conference calls with voters at caucus sites.

== Endorsements ==
Former Senator Conrad Burns endorsed McCain. Secretary of State Brad Johnson endorsed Romney. Former Governor Judy Martz endorsed Huckabee.

== Results ==
100% of precincts reporting
| Candidate | Votes | Percentage | Delegates |
|---|---|---|---|
| Mitt Romney | 625 | 38.34% | 25 |
| Ron Paul | 400 | 24.54% | 0 |
| John McCain | 358 | 21.96% | 0 |
| Mike Huckabee | 245 | 15.03% | 0 |
| Alan Keyes | 2 | 0.12% | 0 |
| Total | 1,630 | 100% | 25 |

== Primary ==
Montana held a non-binding Republican primary on June 3, 2008. John McCain won the primary.

100% of precincts reporting
| Candidate | Votes | Percentage |
|---|---|---|
| John McCain | 72,551 | 76.18% |
| Ron Paul | 20,452 | 21.48% |
| No Preference | 1,786 | 2.93% |

== See also ==
- 2008 Montana Democratic presidential primary
- 2008 Republican Party presidential primaries
