= 2008 U.S. Virgin Islands Republican presidential caucuses =

- April 5, 2008
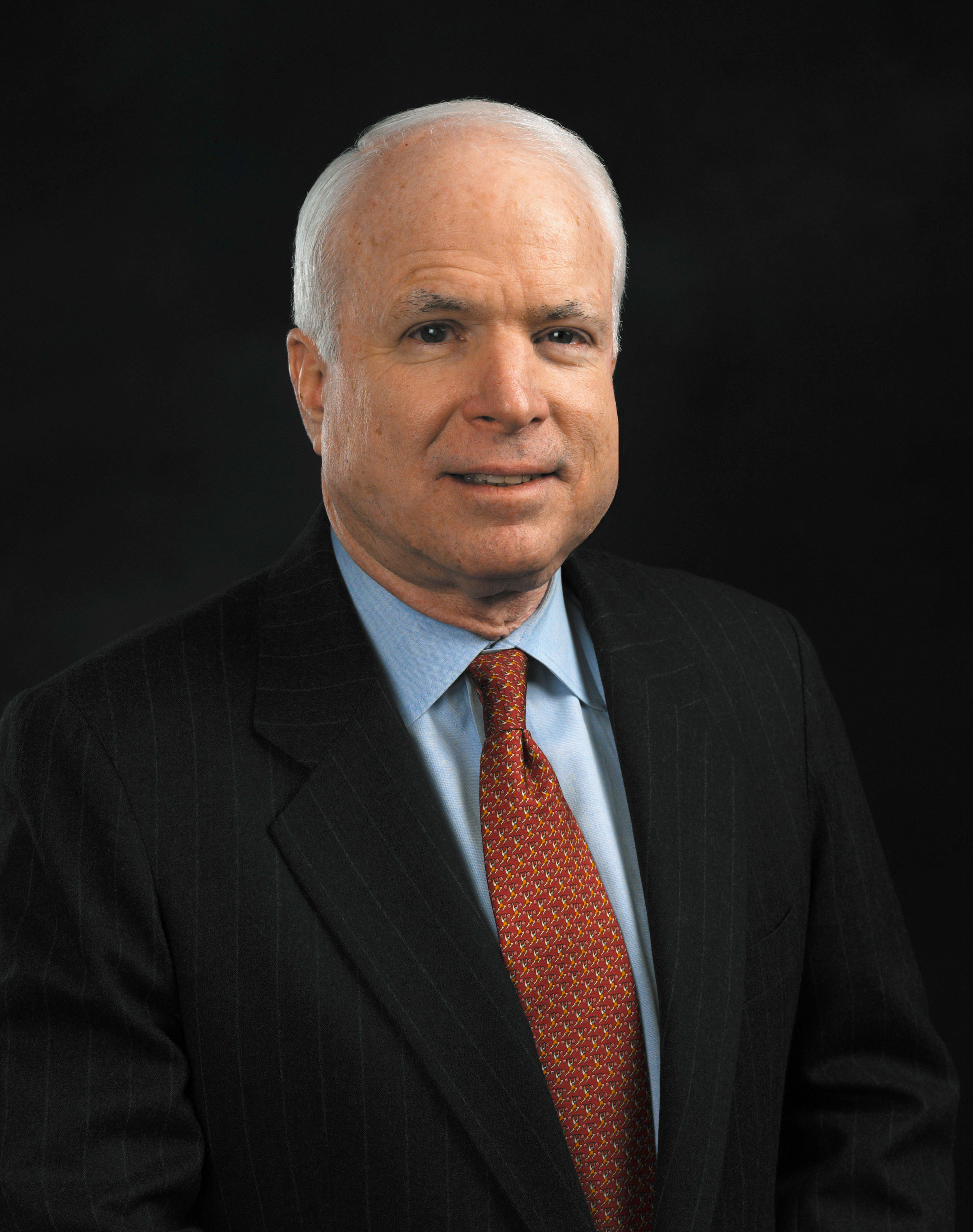

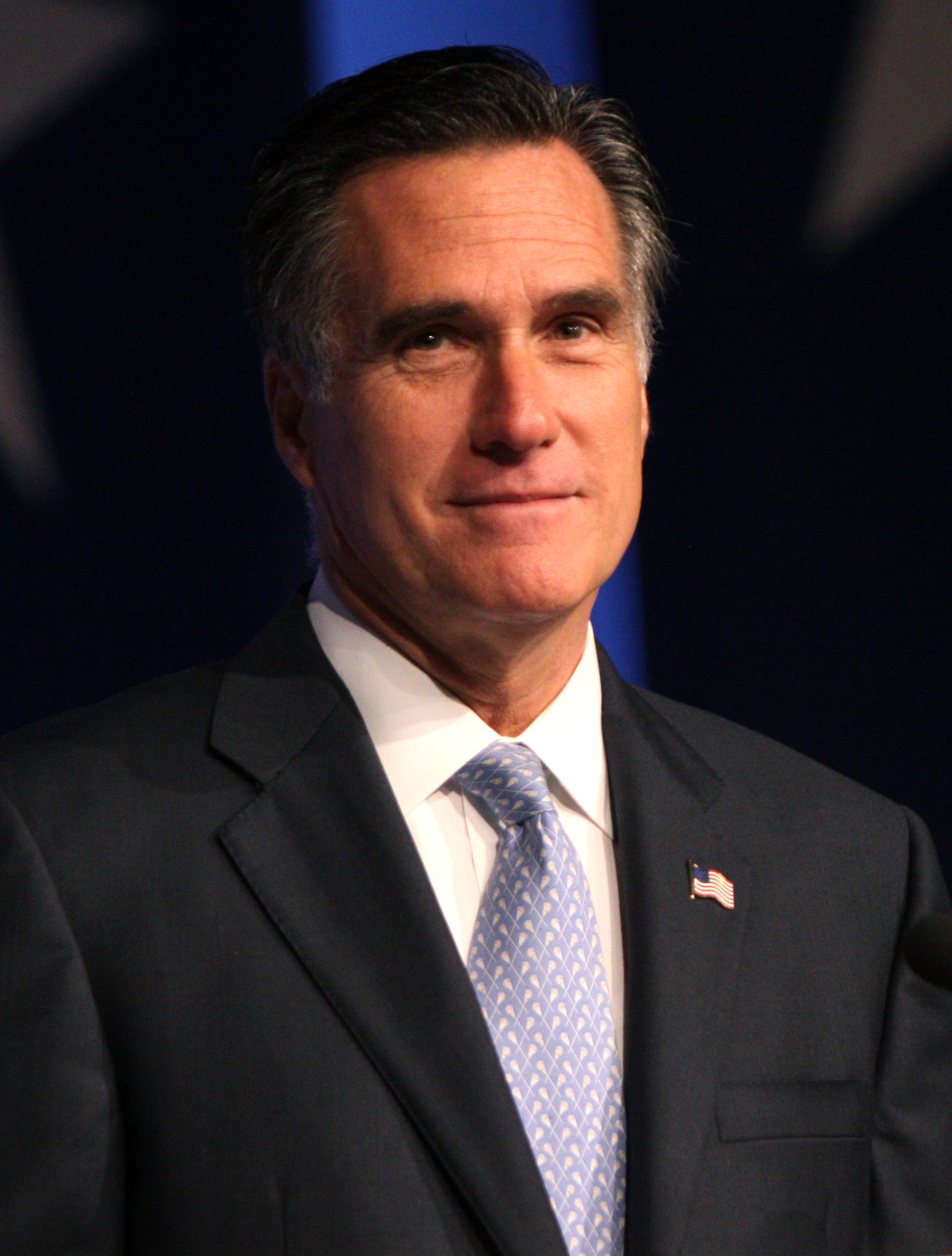

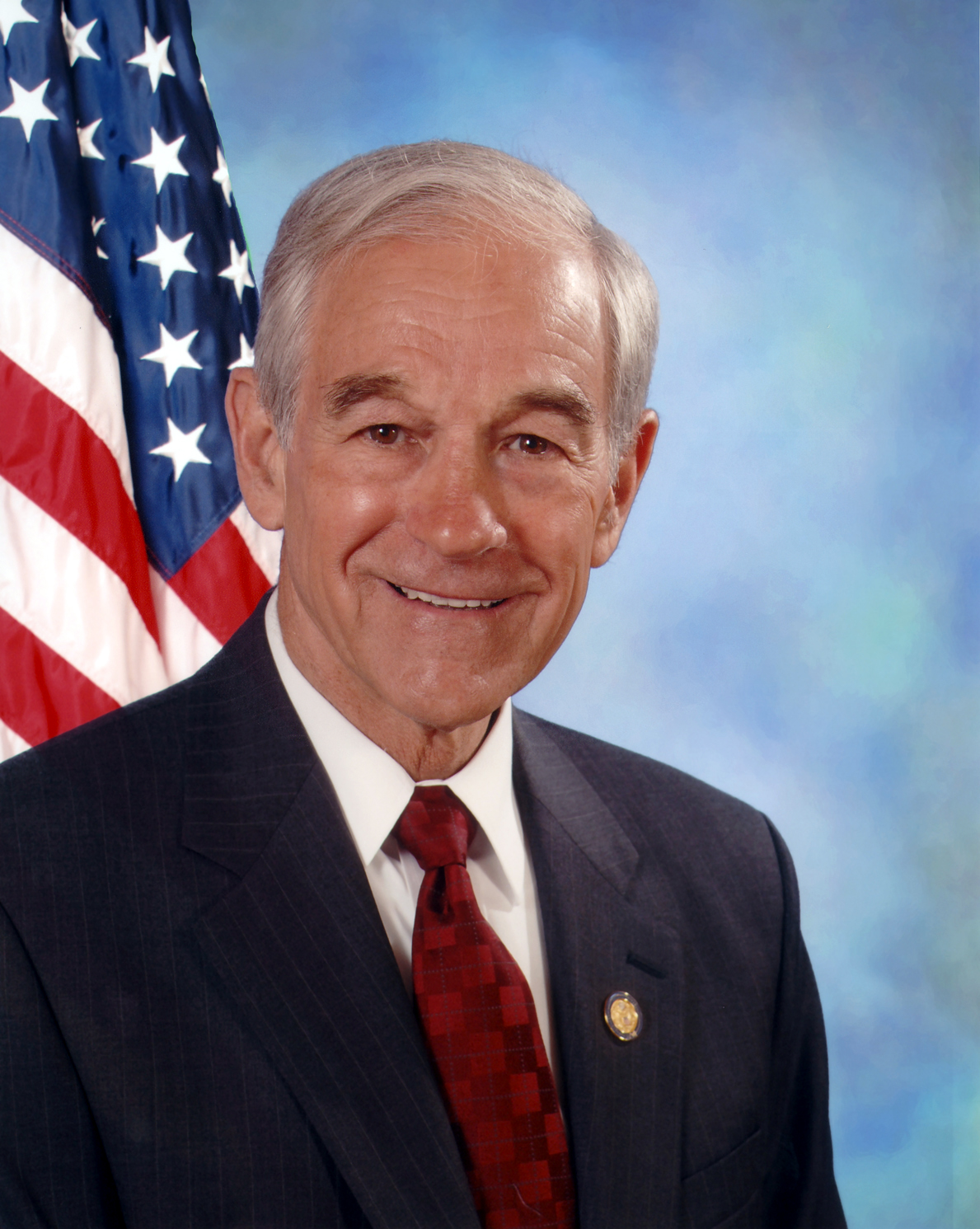
Candidate	John McCain	Mitt Romney	Ron Paul
Party	Republican	Republican	Republican
Home state	Arizona	Massachusetts	Texas
Popular vote	102	60	9
Percentage	31.5%	18.5%	2.8%

The 2008 U.S. Virgin Islands Republican territorial meeting, also known as the Republican caucuses, took place on the U.S. Virgin Islands of St. Croix and St. Thomas on April 5, 2008. Virgin Islands Republicans could select six pledged delegates for the 2008 Republican National Convention; three party leaders also attended the convention as unpledged delegates. However, the delegates chosen in the meeting did not support any presidential candidate, so all nine Virgin Islands delegates attended the convention as unpledged delegates.

The turnout, around 150 people, did not match the comparatively staggering number of voters in the Democratic Territorial Meeting, but it was still a record turnout for the Virgin Islands Republican Party. Caucus-goers voted for delegates rather than candidates. Of 25 people who sought delegate spots, the majority, 16, were not committed to any presidential candidate.

== Results ==
100% of precincts reporting
Candidate	Votes	Percentage	Delegates
Uncommitted	153	47.2%	6
John McCain	102	31.5%	0
Mitt Romney	60	18.5%	0
Ron Paul	9	2.8%	0
Total	324	100%	6

== Delegates ==
=== Chosen by voters ===
- Warren Cole, St. Croix District, uncommitted
- Krim Ballentine, St. Thomas-St. John District, uncommitted
- V. Anne Golden, St. Croix District, uncommitted
- Patricia Murphy, St. Thomas-St. John District, uncommitted
- April Newland, St. Thomas-St. John District, uncommitted
- Humberto O'Neal, Saint Croix District, uncommitted

=== Chosen by party ===
- Lilliana Belardo O'Neal, Republican National Committeewoman
- Holland Redfield, Republican National Committeeman
- Herb Schoenbohm, Republican State Chairman

== See also ==
- Republican Party (United States) presidential primaries, 2008
- United States Virgin Islands Democratic primary, 2008
