= 2008 Colorado Republican presidential caucuses =

- February 5, 2008
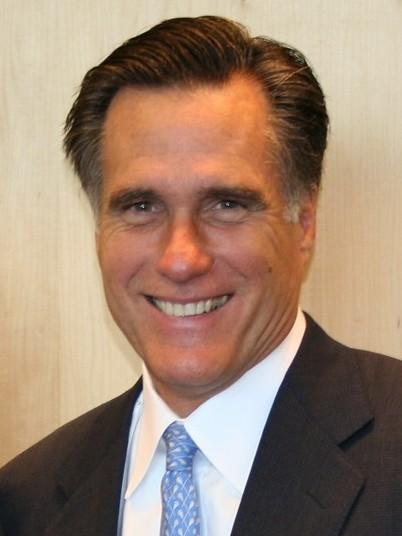

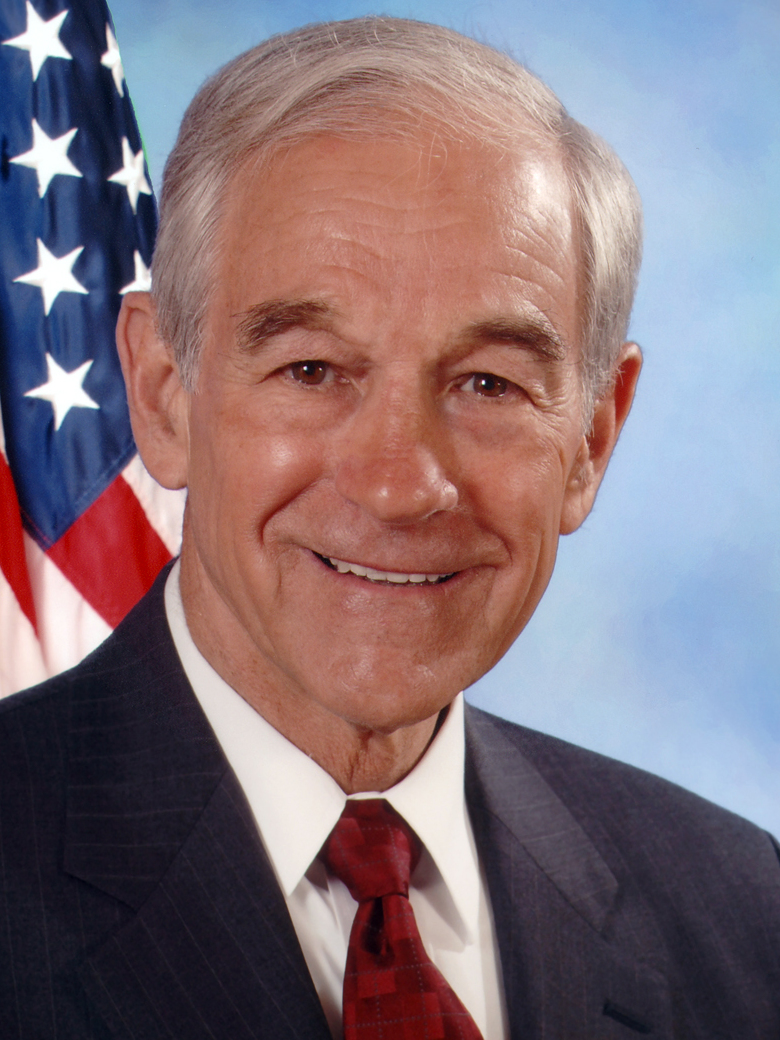
Candidate	Mitt Romney	John McCain
Home state	Massachusetts	Arizona
Delegate count	22	0
Popular vote	42,218	12,918
Percentage	60.11%	18.39%
Candidate	Mike Huckabee	Ron Paul
Home state	Arkansas	Texas
Delegate count	0	0
Popular vote	8,960	5,910
Percentage	12.76%	8.42%
- Election results by county. Mitt Romney John McCain Mike Huckabee Tie No votes

The 2008 Colorado Republican presidential caucuses took place on February 5, 2008, with two national delegates.

Colorado chose 21 other delegates during district conventions from May 24 to June 7, 2008.

== Results ==
Official Results
Candidate	Votes	Percentage	Delegates
Mitt Romney	42,218	60.11%	22
John McCain	12,918	18.39%	0
Mike Huckabee	8,960	12.76%	0
Ron Paul	5,910	8.42%	0
Alan Keyes	67	0.1%	0
Fred Thompson	63	0.09%	0
Rudy Giuliani	58	0.08%	0
Duncan Hunter	25	0.04%	0
Tom Tancredo	10	0.01%	0
Total	70,229	100%	22

== See also ==
- 2008 Colorado Democratic caucuses
- 2008 Republican Party presidential primaries
