= Mike Pompeo =

American politician and diplomat (born 1963)

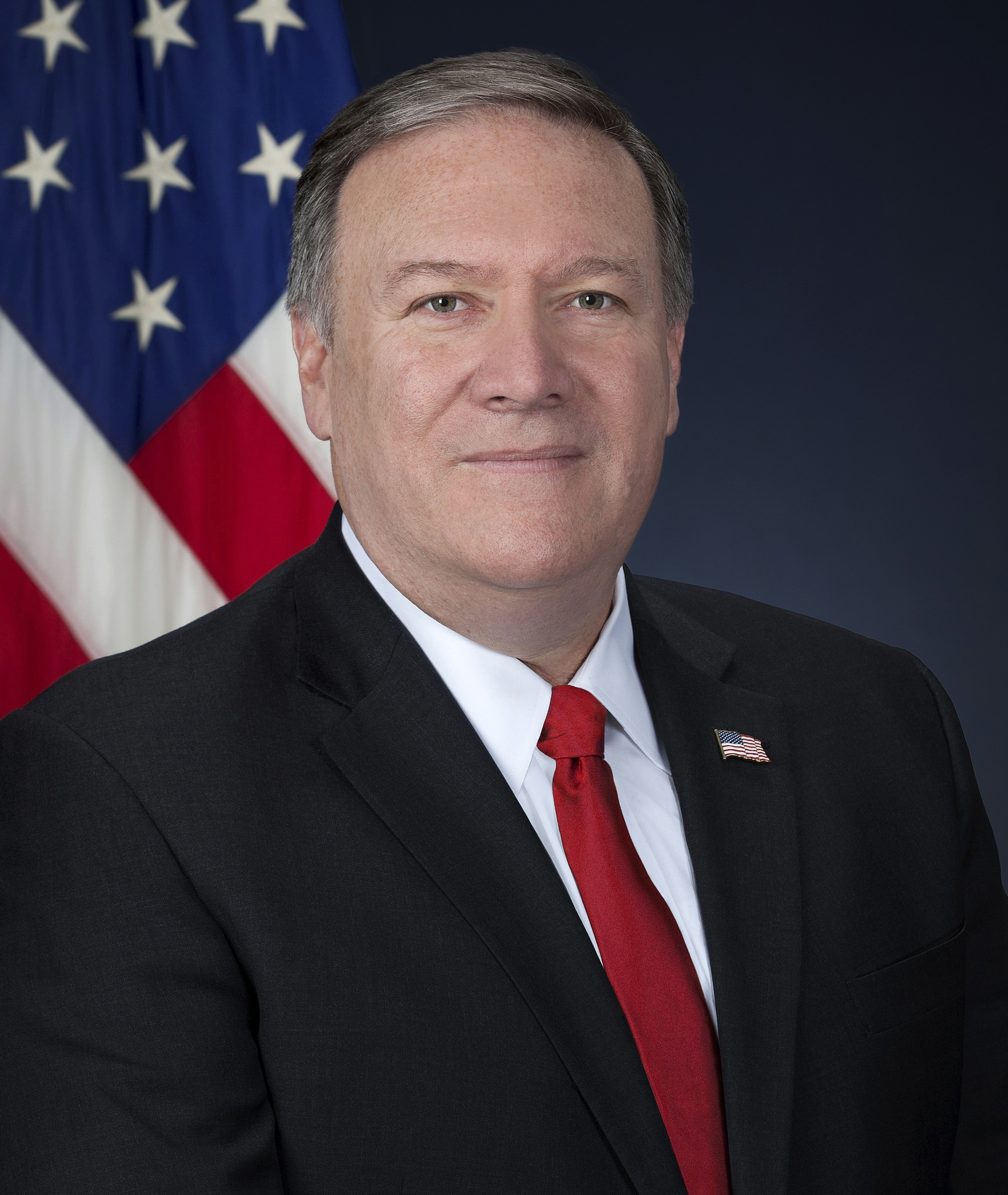
- Official portrait, 2018

70th United States Secretary of State
- In office April 26, 2018 – January 20, 2021
- President: Donald Trump
- Deputy: John Sullivan; Stephen Biegun
- Preceded by: Rex Tillerson
- Succeeded by: Antony Blinken

6th Director of the Central Intelligence Agency
- In office January 23, 2017 – April 26, 2018
- President: Donald Trump
- Deputy: Gina Haspel
- Preceded by: John Brennan
- Succeeded by: Gina Haspel

Member of the U.S. House of Representatives from Kansas's 4th district
- In office January 3, 2011 – January 23, 2017
- Preceded by: Todd Tiahrt
- Succeeded by: Ron Estes

Personal details
- Born: Michael Richard Pompeo; December 30, 1963 (age 62) Orange, California, U.S.
- Party: Republican
- Spouses: Leslie Libert (m. 1986; div. 1997); Susan Justice Mostrous (m. 2000)
- Children: 1
- Education: United States Military Academy (BS); Harvard University (JD)

Military service
- Branch/service: United States Army
- Years of service: 1986–1991
- Rank: Captain
- Unit: 7th Cavalry Regiment; 4th Infantry Division
- Pompeo's voice Pompeo on the restoration of U.S. sanctions against Iran. Recorded August 20, 2020

Michael Richard Pompeo (/pɒmˈpeɪoʊ/; born December 30, 1963) is an American politician, attorney, diplomat, and former U.S. Army officer who served in the first administration of Donald Trump as the director of the Central Intelligence Agency (CIA) from 2017 to 2018, and as the 70th United States secretary of state from 2018 to 2021. A member of the Republican Party, he previously represented Kansas's 4th district in the United States House of Representatives from 2011 to 2017.

Pompeo was born in Orange, California. After graduating from the United States Military Academy in 1986 and completing his obligatory five-year service as a U.S. Army officer, Pompeo went on to graduate from Harvard Law School. He worked as an attorney until 1998 and then became an entrepreneur in the aerospace and oilfield industries. Pompeo was elected to the United States House of Representatives in 2010, representing Kansas's 4th congressional district until 2017. Although Pompeo criticized Donald Trump, whom he called "authoritarian" and "not a conservative believer", as a surrogate for the Marco Rubio campaign, Pompeo later endorsed Trump after he became the Republican nominee in the 2016 presidential election. Trump appointed him Director of the CIA in January 2017 and Secretary of State in April 2018.

As a politician, Pompeo has been a vocal critic of the Chinese Communist Party and general secretary Xi Jinping whom he calls a "dictator"; he directed U.S.–China relations in opposition to China's policies regarding the oppression of Uyghurs, Hong Kong, Taiwan, and the South China Sea. He was sanctioned by China immediately after leaving office. He advocated for moving U.S. Embassy in Israel to Jerusalem, and the withdrawal of the United States from the 2015 nuclear deal with Iran.

As CIA director, Pompeo invoked the state secrets privilege to prevent CIA officers from testifying in the trials regarding the CIA's enhanced interrogation techniques. As secretary of state, Pompeo declared that the U.S.'s human rights policy should prioritize religious liberty and property rights. In relations with Israel, he oversaw the controversial moving the U.S. Embassy in Israel to Jerusalem, the recognition of the Golan Heights as part of Israel, and the end of recognition of Israeli settlement in the West Bank as a violation of international law. In other Middle East policy, he supervised the reduction of U.S. forces in Syria, and the assassination of Qasem Soleimani. He brokered the Abraham Accords, which normalized diplomatic relations between Israel and the United Arab Emirates, and disputed the role of Mohammed bin Salman in the assassination of Jamal Khashoggi. He unsuccessfully negotiated to dismantle North Korea's nuclear weapons program, at multiple summits of the 2017–2018 North Korea crisis.

He was among the staunchest Trump loyalists in the Cabinet and routinely flouted State Department norms in aid of Trump's objectives, including supporting Trump's efforts to overturn the 2020 presidential election, and a 2020 Republican National Convention speech found to be in violation of the Hatch Act. In an Instagram post after his victory in the 2024 election, President Trump declared that he would "not be inviting Mike Pompeo and Nikki Haley to join" his next administration.

== Early life and education ==
Pompeo was born in Orange, California, the son of Dorothy (born Mercer) and Wayne Pompeo. His paternal great-grandparents, Carlo Pompeo and Adelina Tollis were born in Pacentro, Abruzzo, Italy, and emigrated to the United States in 1899 and 1900, respectively. In 1982, Pompeo graduated from Los Amigos High School in Fountain Valley, California, where he played forward on the basketball team. In 1986, Pompeo graduated first in his class from the United States Military Academy at West Point, where he majored in engineering management. He was a classmate of Brian Bulatao and Ulrich Brechbuhl, who later helped him found Thayer Aerospace. Today, the tight-knit group of graduates—some cheekily refer to themselves (Mike Pompeo, Ulrich Brechbuhl and Brian Bulatao), as the "West Point Mafia"—constitutes a uniquely powerful circle at the highest levels of government.

From 1986 to 1991, Pompeo served in the U.S. Army as an armor officer with the West Germany-based 2nd Squadron, 7th Cavalry in the 4th Infantry Division. He served as a tank platoon leader before becoming a cavalry troop executive officer and then the squadron maintenance officer. Pompeo left the U.S. Army at the rank of captain.

In 1994, Pompeo earned a juris doctor from Harvard Law School, where he was an editor of the Harvard Law Review and the Harvard Journal of Law & Public Policy.

== Early career ==
After graduating from law school, he worked as a lawyer for Williams & Connolly in Washington.

In 1996, Pompeo moved to Wichita, Kansas, where he and three West Point friends, Brian Bulatao, Ulrich Brechbuhl, and Michael Stradinger, acquired three aircraft-parts manufacturers there (Aero Machine, Precision Profiling, B&B Machine) and in St. Louis (Advance Tool & Die), renaming the entity Thayer Aerospace after West Point superintendent Sylvanus Thayer. Venture funding for the private organization included a nearly 20% investment from Koch Industries as well as Dallas-based Cardinal Investment, and Bain & Company (Brechbuhl worked for Bain at the time). Brechbuhl and Stradinger left the company shortly after it was founded, but Pompeo and Bulatao continued.

In 2006, he sold his interest in the company, which by then had been renamed Nex-Tech Aerospace, to Highland Capital Management, which had clients including Lockheed Martin, Gulfstream Aerospace, Cessna Aircraft, Boeing, Spirit AeroSystems and Raytheon Aircraft. Pompeo then became president of Sentry International, an oilfield equipment manufacturer that was also a partner of Koch Industries.

In 2017, when Pompeo became head of the CIA, he named his former business partner, Brian Bulatao, the agency's chief operating officer.

== U.S. House of Representatives (2011–2017) ==
=== Elections ===
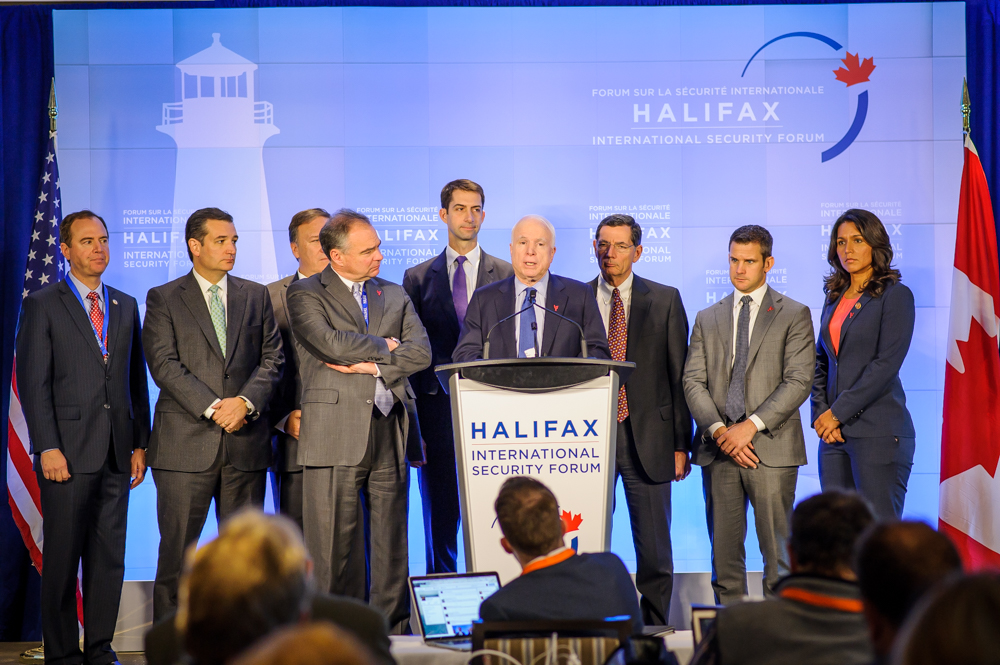
U.S. congressional delegation at the Halifax International Security Forum in 2014

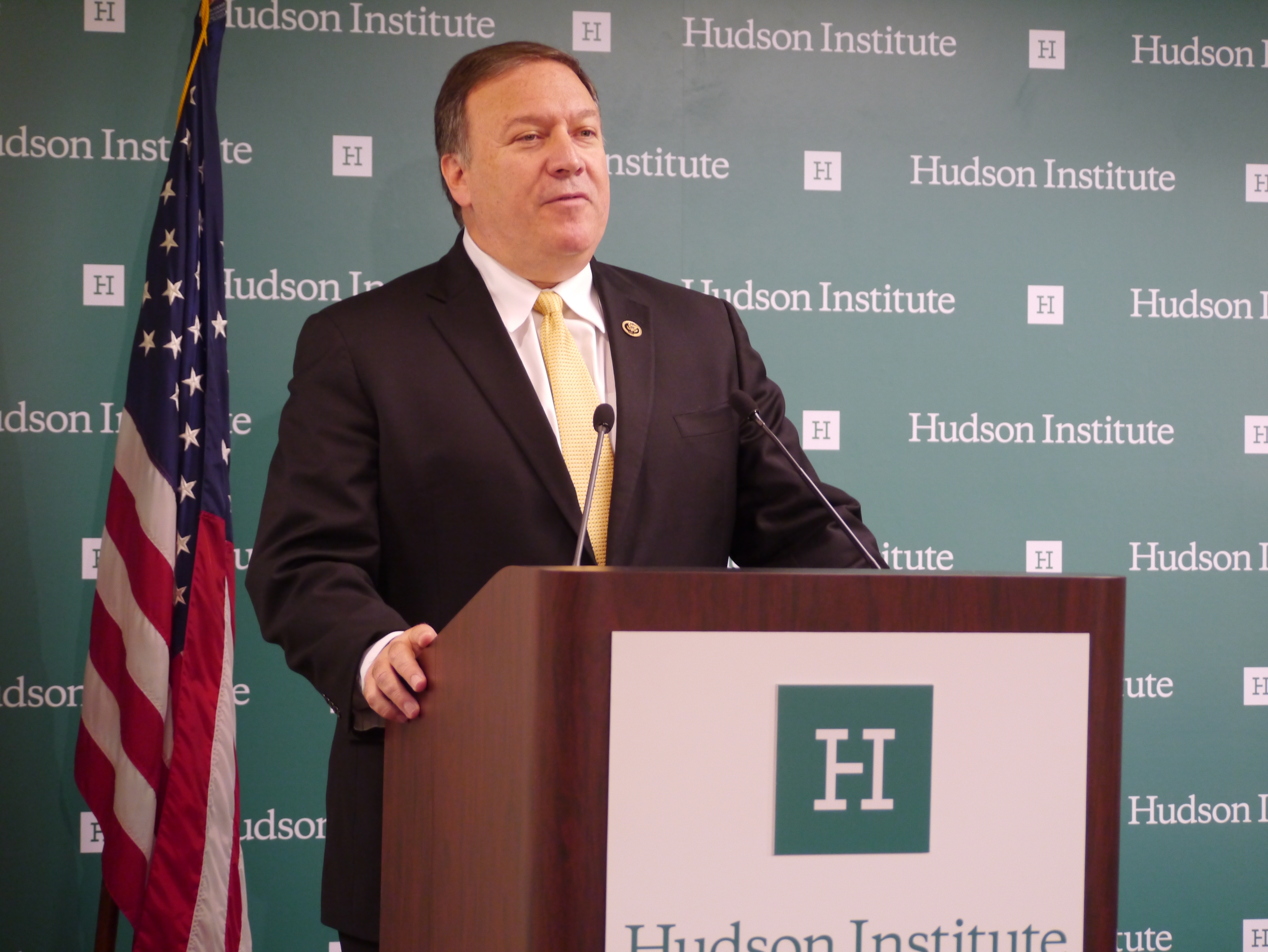
Pompeo speaking at the Hudson Institute in May 2015

Pompeo represented Kansas's 4th congressional district from 2011 until his January 2017 appointment to director of the Central Intelligence Agency (CIA).

In the 2010 election, Pompeo won the Republican primary for Kansas's 4th District congressional seat with 39% of the vote, defeating state senator Jean Schodorf (who received 24%) and two other candidates. Late in the primary, Schodorf began to surge in the polls, prompting two outside groups—Common Sense Issues and Americans for Prosperity—to spend tens of thousands of dollars in the campaign's final days to attack Schodorf and support Pompeo. A month before the general election, Pompeo was endorsed by former U.S. senator and former presidential candidate Bob Dole. In the general election, Pompeo defeated Democratic nominee Raj Goyle, a member of the Kansas House of Representatives. Pompeo received 59% of the vote (117,171 votes) to 36% for Goyle (71,866).

During Pompeo's campaign, its affiliated Twitter account praised as a "good read" a news article that called Goyle, his Indian-American opponent, a "turban topper" who "could be a Muslim, a Hindu, a Buddhist etc. who knows". Pompeo later apologized to Goyle for the tweet. Pompeo received $80,000 in donations during the campaign from Koch Industries and its employees.

In the 2012 election, Pompeo defeated Democratic nominee Robert Tillman by a margin of 62–32%. Koch Industries gave Pompeo's campaign $110,000.

In the 2014 election, Pompeo won the general election with 67% of the vote, defeating Democrat Perry Schuckman.

In the 2016 election, Pompeo beat Democrat Daniel B. Giroux in the general election with 61% of the vote.

=== Tenure in Congress ===
Pompeo served on the United States House Permanent Select Committee on Intelligence, the United States House Committee on Energy and Commerce, the United States House Energy Subcommittee on Digital Commerce and Consumer Protection, the United States House Energy Subcommittee on Energy, the United States House Intelligence Subcommittee on the CIA, and the United States House Select Committee on Benghazi.

Pompeo was a member of the Congressional Constitution Caucus.

Pompeo was original sponsor of the Safe and Accurate Food Labeling Act of 2015.

== CIA Director (2017–2018) ==
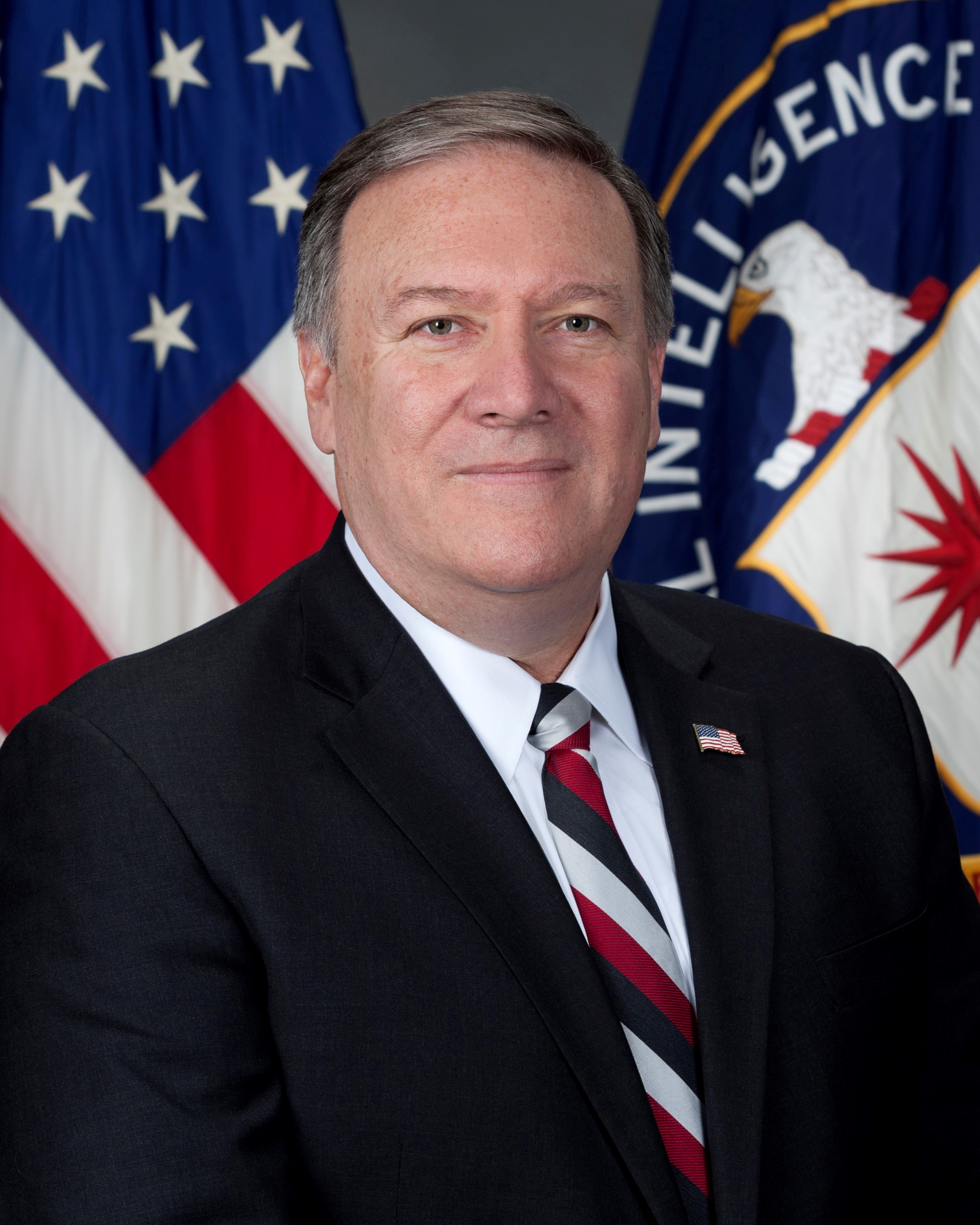
Official portrait of Mike Pompeo as CIA Director, 2017

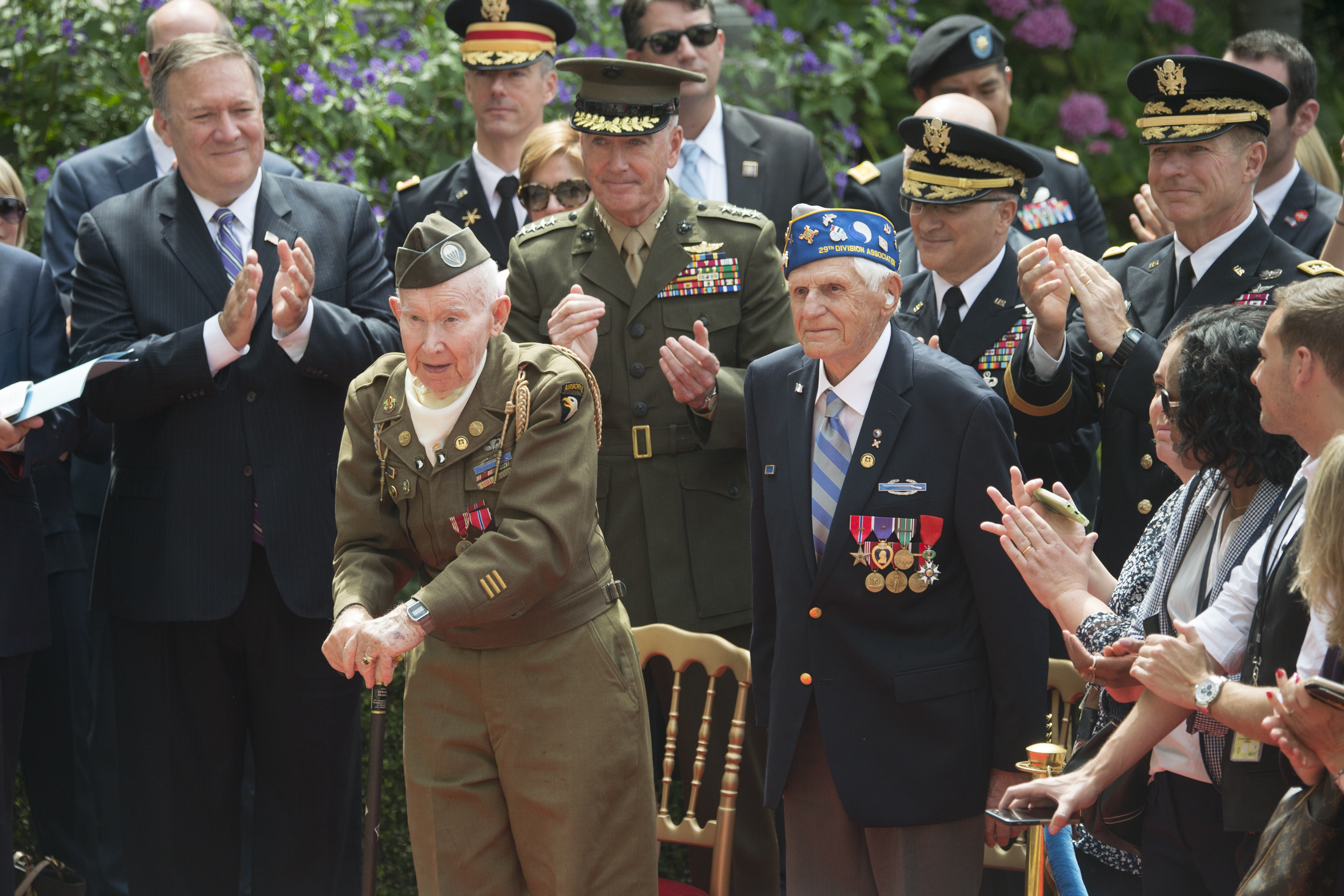
World War II veterans being honored at Bastille Day celebrations on July 13, 2017

On November 18, 2016, President-elect Donald Trump announced that he would nominate Pompeo to be the director of the Central Intelligence Agency. He was confirmed by the Senate on January 23, 2017, with a vote of 66–32, and sworn in later that day. In his confirmation he failed to disclose the links between his company in Kansas and a Chinese government-owned firm.

In February 2017, Pompeo traveled to Turkey and Saudi Arabia. He met with Turkish president Recep Tayyip Erdoğan to discuss policy on Syria and ISIL. Pompeo honored the then-crown prince of Saudi Arabia Muhammad bin Nayef with the CIA's "George Tenet" Medal. It was the first reaffirmation of Saudi Arabia–United States relations since Trump took office in January 2017. In March 2017, Pompeo formally invoked state secrets privilege to prevent CIA officers, including Gina Haspel and James Cotsana, from being compelled to testify in the trial of Bruce Jessen and James Elmer Mitchell.

On 13 April 2017, in an address at the Center for Strategic and International Studies, Pompeo described WikiLeaks as a "hostile intelligence service." This was in response to the publication of Vault 7, that detailed the electronic surveillance and cyber warfare capabilities of the CIA.

In June 2017, Pompeo named Michael D'Andrea head of the CIA's Iran mission center.

In August 2017, Pompeo took direct command of the Counterintelligence Mission Center, the department which had helped to launch an investigation into possible links between Trump associates and Russian officials. Former CIA officials, including John Sipher, expressed concern given Pompeo's proximity to the White House and Donald Trump.

In September 2017, Pompeo sought authority for the CIA to make covert drone strikes without the Pentagon's involvement, including inside Afghanistan. During Easter weekend 2018, Pompeo visited North Korea and met with Supreme Leader Kim Jong-un to discuss the upcoming 2018 North Korea–United States summit between Kim and Trump.

Pompeo usually personally delivered the president's daily brief in the Oval Office. At Trump's request, Pompeo met with former NSA official William E. Binney to discuss his doubts of Russian interference in the 2016 United States elections.

At the suggestion of Tony Perkins, president of the Family Research Council, Pompeo planned to hire chaplains at the CIA. In an April 2019 speech at Texas A&M University, Pompeo said "I was the CIA director. We lied, we cheated, we stole. It was like we had entire training courses . . . it reminds you of the glory of the American experiment."

== Secretary of State (2018–2021) ==
=== Nomination and confirmation ===
President Trump announced on March 13, 2018, that he would nominate Pompeo to serve as secretary of state, succeeding Rex Tillerson, who stepped down on March 31, 2018.

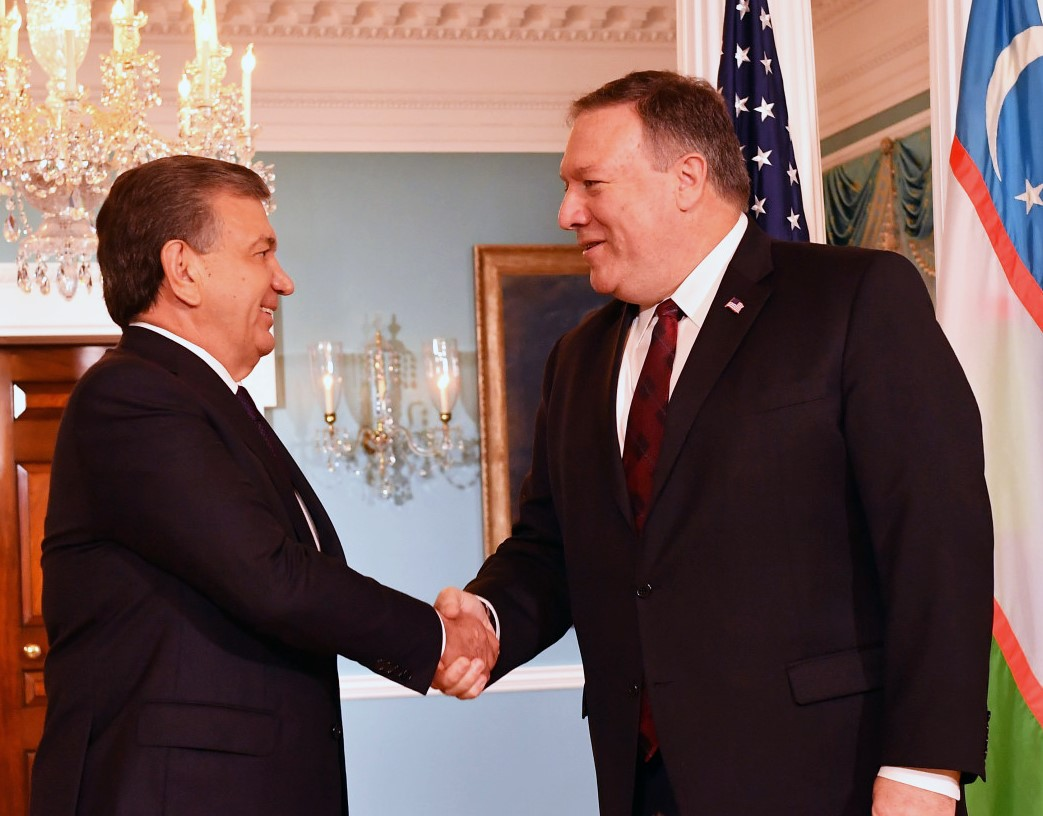
Pompeo with Uzbekistan's president Shavkat Mirziyoyev, shortly after becoming secretary of state

On April 23, the Senate Foreign Relations Committee voted 11–9 in favor of sending Pompeo's nomination to the full Senate, with Senator Chris Coons voting "present" and Johnny Isakson, who was absent that day, voting "yes by proxy". In the interest of saving the committee's time, Coons decided to vote "present", as the vote would have been tied if he had voted no on the nomination with Isakson absent, a situation that would have nullified his vote. The Senate floor vote took place on April 26 and Pompeo was confirmed by the full Senate by a 57–42 vote, with five of ten Democratic senators running for reelection in the 2018 midterms in states that Trump won in 2016, voting to confirm Pompeo.

Pompeo was sworn in on April 26, 2018. In testimony before the Senate, he promised to prioritize improving the low-morale issue at the State Department.

Confirmation process
| Voting body | Vote date | Vote results |
|---|---|---|
| Senate Committee on Foreign Relations | April 12, 2018 | 11–9 |
| Full Senate | April 23, 2018 | 57–42 |

=== Tenure ===
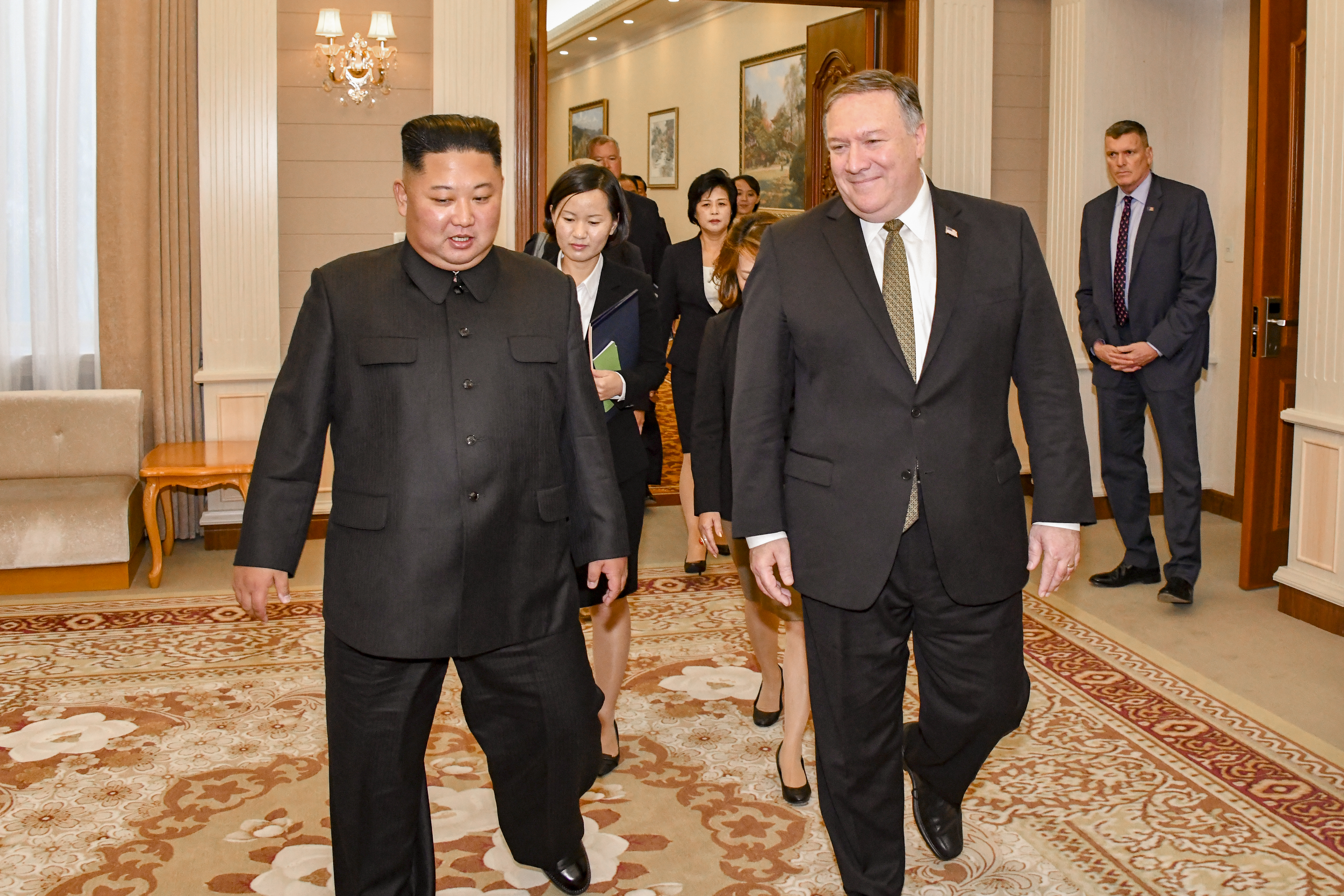
Pompeo and North Korean leader Kim Jong Un met in Pyongyang, October 2018.

During his tenure as secretary of state, Pompeo was described as among the staunchest Trump loyalists in the Cabinet. During his tenure, he routinely flouted norms followed by his predecessors. These included a speech via satellite from Jerusalem supporting Trump's re-election, firing State Department inspector general Steve Linick, and standing on the sidelines while Trump and his allies conducted a smear campaign against career diplomat Marie Yovanovitch. Under Pompeo's tenure, career State Department officials quit, were forced into retirement or fired, and were replaced by inexperienced political appointees. Like Trump, Pompeo praised dictators and criticized the U.S.'s traditional democratic allies. International relations scholars Daniel Drezner, Richard Sokolsky, and Aaron David Miller described Pompeo as the worst secretary of state in American history, citing numerous foreign policy failures, fealty to Trump at the cost of U.S. national interest, and improprieties in office.

Pompeo played a role in Trump's three summits with North Korean supreme leader Kim Jong Un. The summits failed to achieve any reduction in North Korea's nuclear arsenal. In a 2021 interview with a conservative podcast, Pompeo said that "I regret that we didn't make more progress" on North Korea.

In August 2018, Pompeo thanked Crown Prince Mohammad bin Salman "for Saudi Arabia's support for northeast Syria's urgent stabilization needs". Pompeo and Crown Prince also discussed the situation in war-torn Yemen.

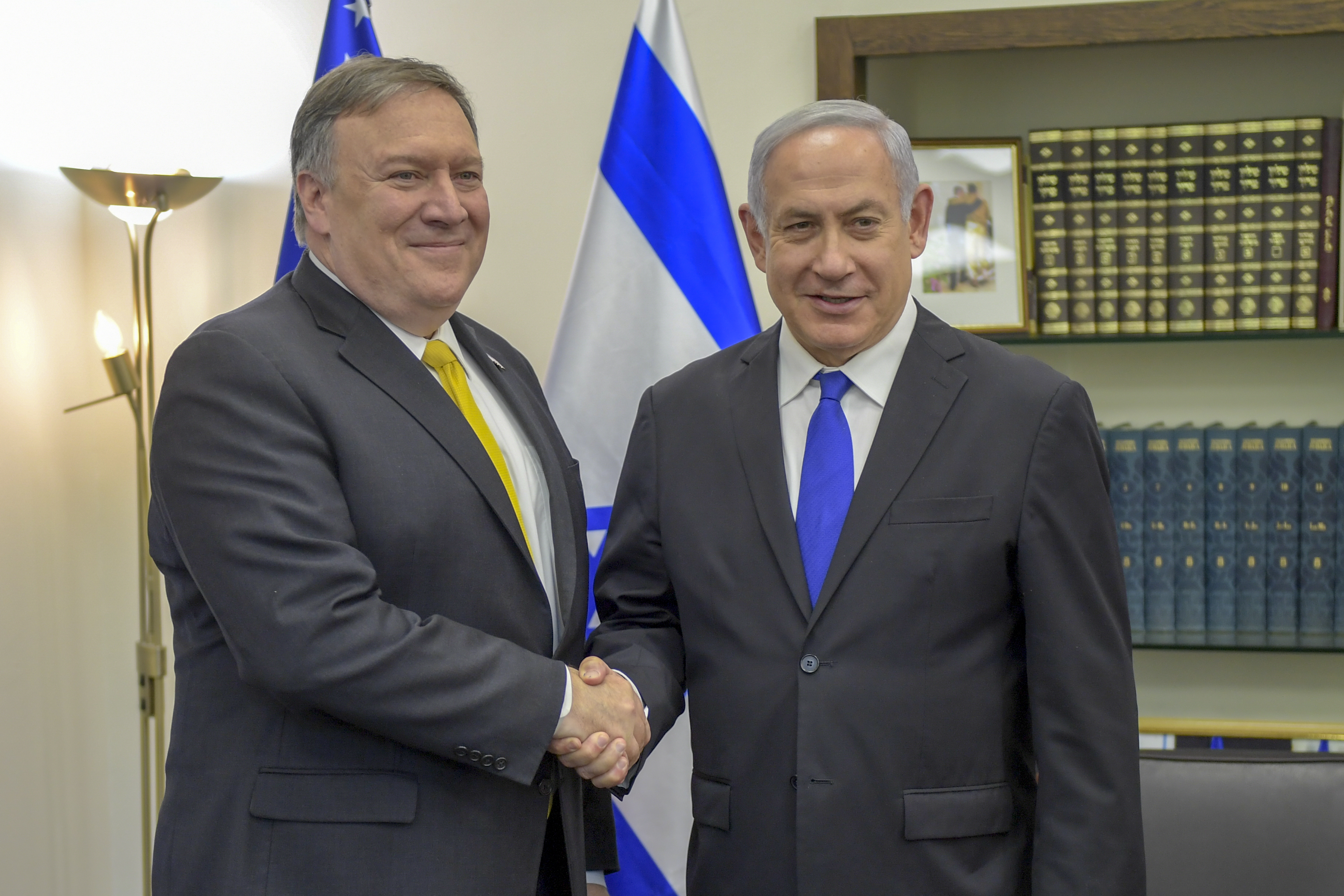
Pompeo with Israeli prime minister Benjamin Netanyahu in April 2018

Pompeo condemned the military crackdown by the Myanmar Army and police on Rohingya Muslims. In July 2018, Pompeo raised the issue of Xinjiang re-education camps and human rights abuses against the Uyghur minority in China. Pompeo criticized Iran's supreme leader Ayatollah Ali Khamenei for his refusal to condemn the Chinese government's repressions against the Uyghurs.

On October 10, 2018, Pompeo said Israel "is everything we want the entire Middle East to look like going forward" and that the Israel–United States relations are "stronger than ever". In March 2019, when questioned regarding Israel's conflicts with Iran and following a visit to the Western Wall with Israeli prime minister Benjamin Netanyahu, Pompeo spoke to "the work that our administration's done to make sure that this democracy in the Middle East, that this Jewish state, remains ... I am confident that the Lord is at work here."

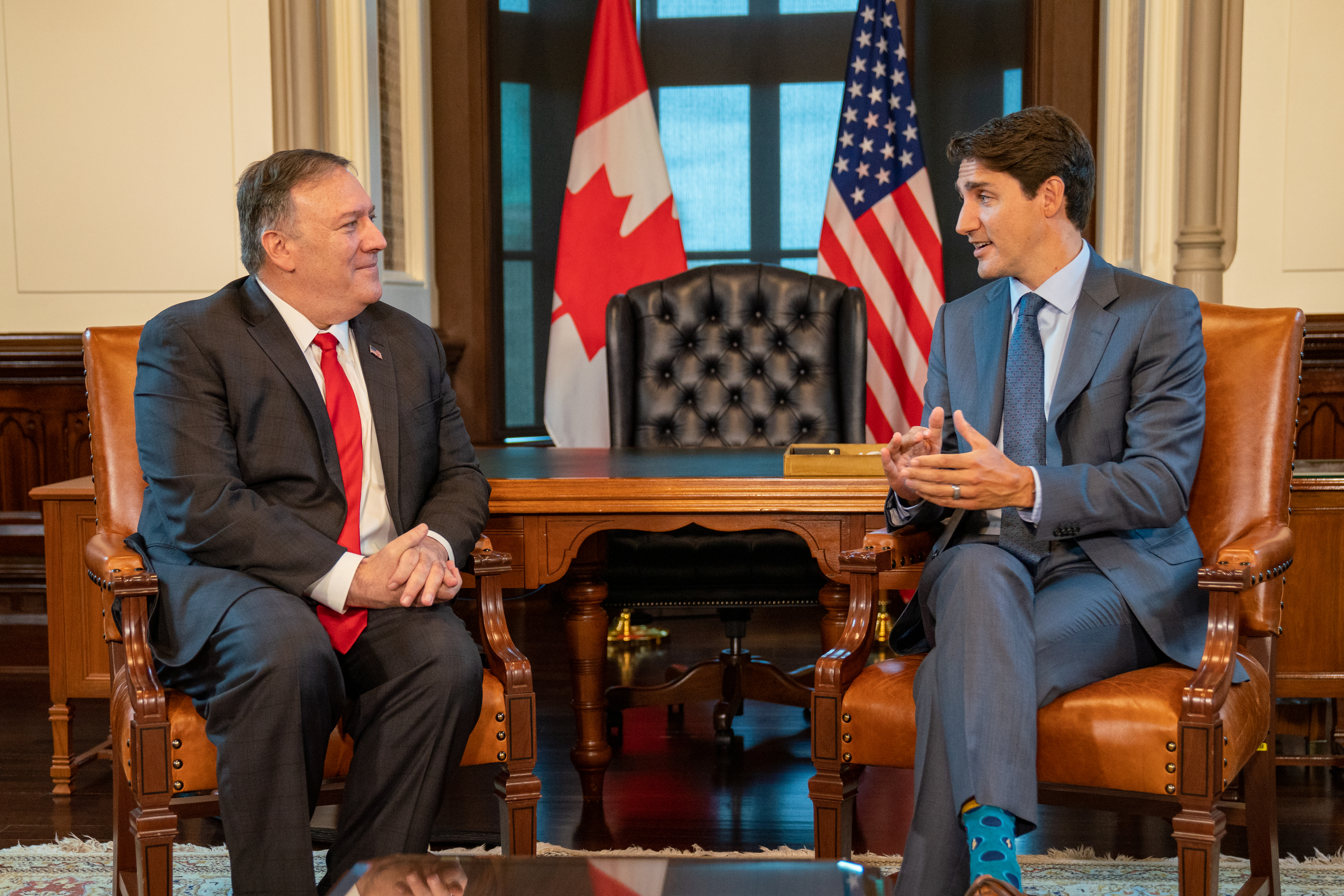
Pompeo with Canadian prime minister Justin Trudeau in August 2019

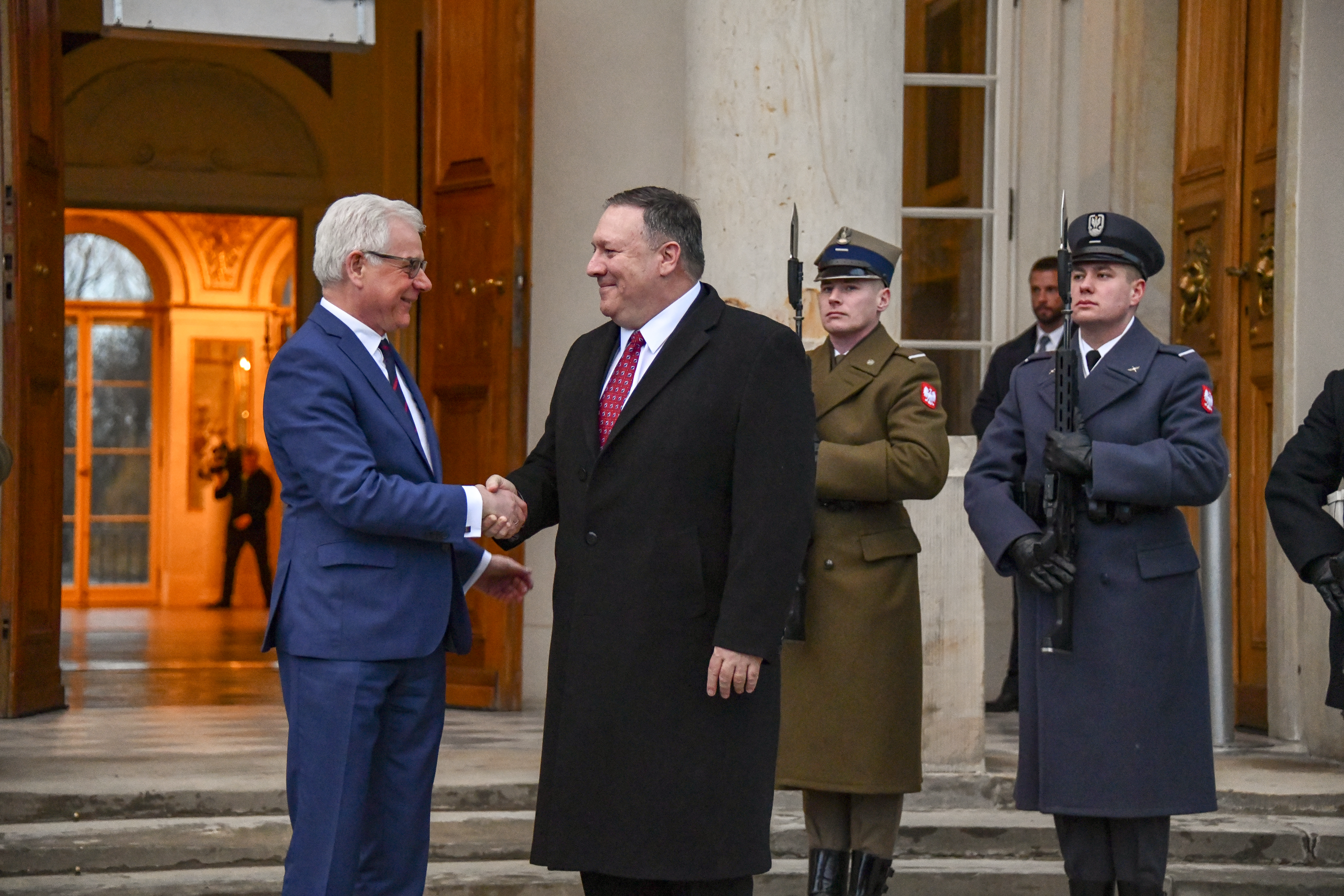
Pompeo meeting with Polish foreign minister Jacek Czaputowicz in February 2019

On November 16, 2018, a CIA assessment was leaked to the media, that concluded with "high confidence" Saudi Arabia's crown prince Mohammad bin Salman ordered the October 2, 2018, assassination of Washington Post columnist Jamal Khashoggi. Under mounting pressure from lawmakers who wanted action against Saudi Arabia, Pompeo disputed the CIA's conclusion and declared there was no direct evidence linking the Crown Prince to the Khashoggi's assassination.

In what was seen as an effort to promote his presumed candidacy in the 2024 Republican presidential primary, Pompeo's book, Never Give an Inch: Fighting for the America I Love, returned to his theme that the assassination and dismemberment was of little international consequence, that the victim was not a reporter of much, if any consequence, and was merely an "activist." He further denigrated Khashoggi as, "...cozy with the terrorist-supporting Muslim Brotherhood."

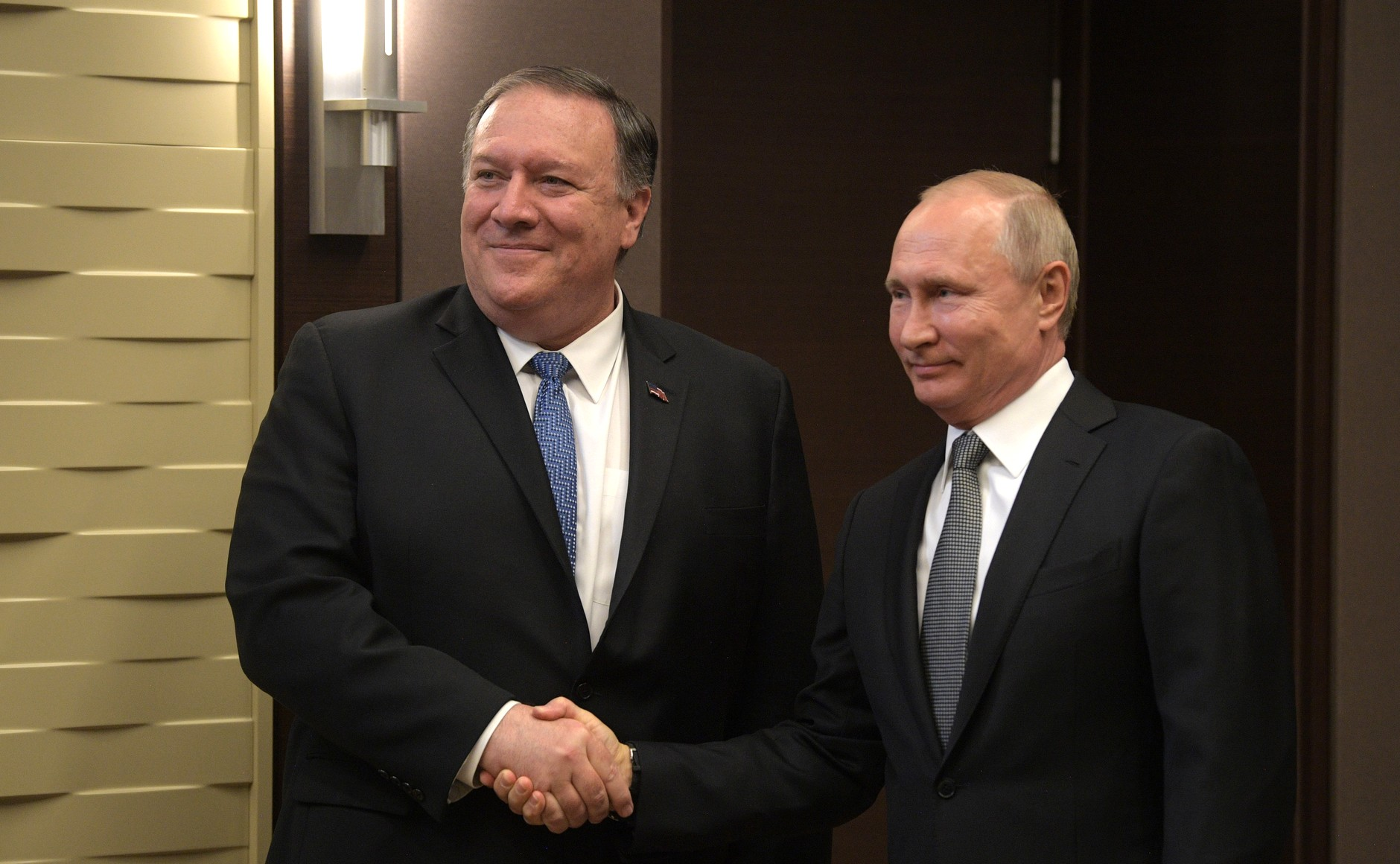
Pompeo and Russian president Vladimir Putin met in Sochi, May 2019.

On January 7, 2019, Pompeo began a diplomatic tour of the Middle East to assure regional U.S. partners that, amid the sudden withdrawal of U.S. troops from Syria, the U.S. mission to degrade and destroy the Islamic State and to counter Iranian influence in the region had not changed. The trip included stops in Jordan, Iraq, Egypt, and the Gulf nations.

Pompeo announced on January 23, 2019, that Juan Guaidó would be recognized by the U.S. as the legitimate interim president of Venezuela, and that American diplomats in Caracas would remain at their posts, even as Nicolás Maduro gave them three days to evacuate the country upon Guaidó assumption of the presidency. After protests for over "homophobic, racist and misogynist remarks" by Brazilian president Jair Bolsonaro, a ceremony hosted by the Brazilian-American Chamber of Commerce (originally set to honor Pompeo and Bolsonaro) was canceled.

On May 14, 2019, Pompeo met for three hours with Russian foreign minister Sergey Lavrov and for ninety minutes with Russian president Vladimir Putin in Sochi, Russia. According to a Kremlin aide, they discussed Syria, North Korea, Iran, Venezuela, and the New Strategic Arms Reduction Treaty (New START); Pompeo said he brought up—and Putin again denied—Russian election interference.

In October 2019, the State Department web site promoted a speech by Pompeo "On Being a Christian Leader", which he delivered to the American Association of Christian Counselors in his official government role. Pompeo touts Christianity in his speech, describes how he applies his faith to his government work. The promotion of the speech by the State Department was met with criticism from those who believed it was incompatible with separation of church and state. He also created the Commission on Unalienable Rights, and created a faith-based employee affinity group that includes contractors.

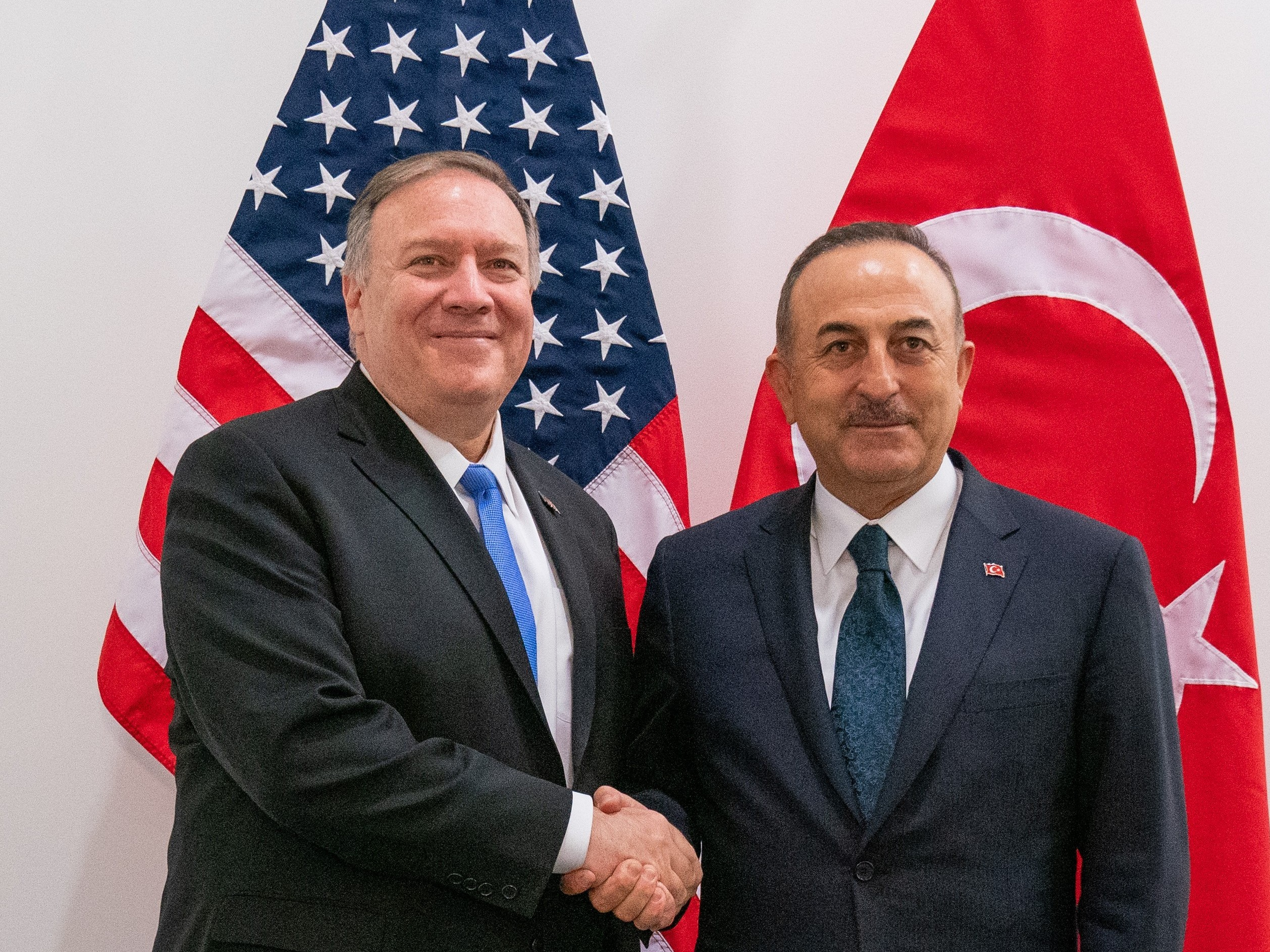
Pompeo meeting with Turkish foreign minister Mevlüt Çavuşoğlu in November 2019

Pompeo defended the 2019 Turkish offensive into north-eastern Syria, saying Turkey has a "legitimate security concern" with "a terrorist threat to their south". However, Pompeo denied that the United States had given a "green light" for Turkey to attack the Kurds.

In November 2019, Pompeo said the U.S. no longer views Israeli settlements in the occupied West Bank as a violation of international law, breaking with decades of U.S. policy.

In rejecting a claimed double standard in recognizing Israel's annexation of the Golan Heights but placing sanctions on Russia for annexing Crimea in 2014, Pompeo said "What the President did with the Golan Heights is recognize the reality on the ground and the security situation necessary for the protection of the Israeli state."

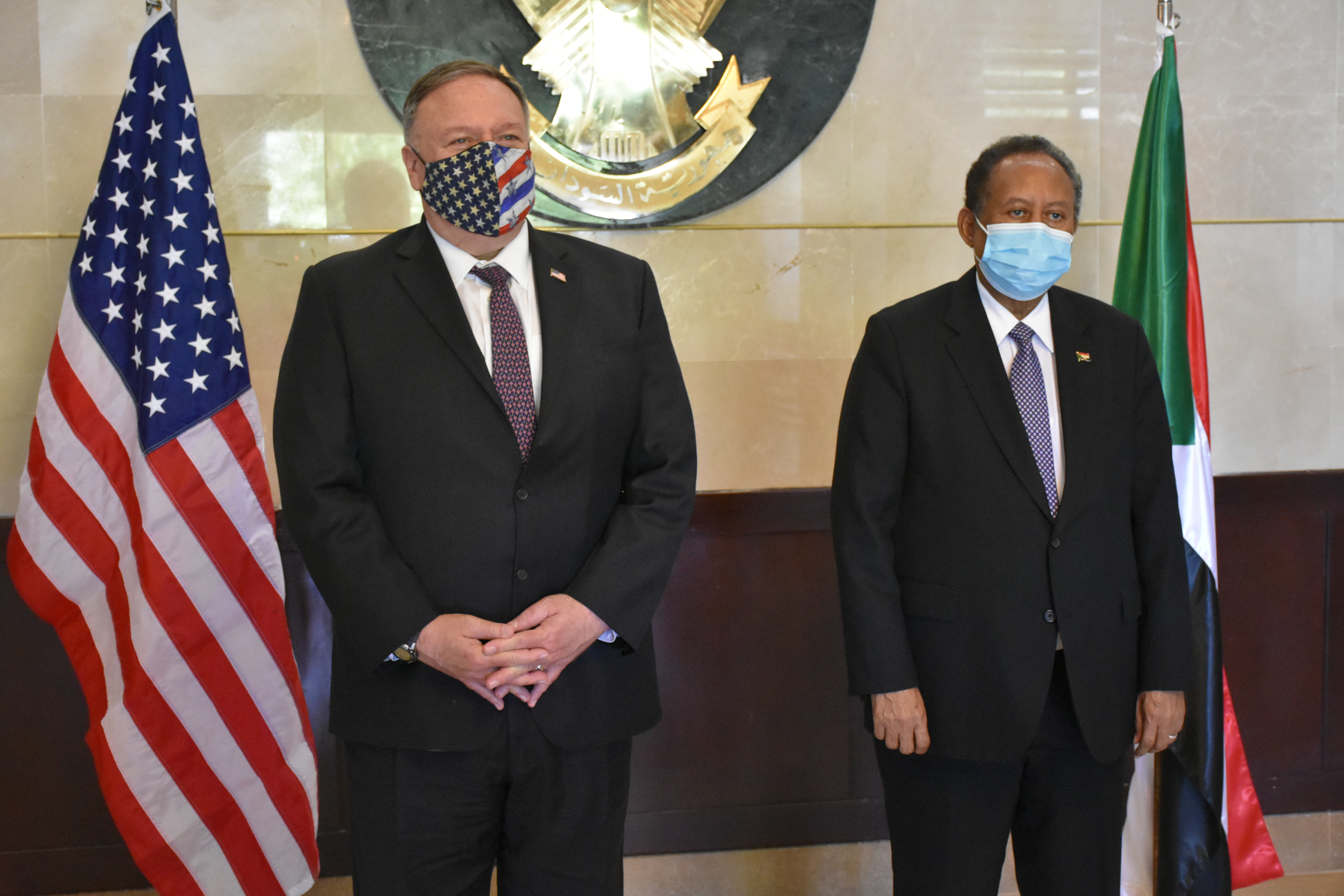
Pompeo with Sudanese prime minister Abdalla Hamdok, in Khartoum, Sudan, on August 25, 2020

In January 2020, the Trump administration approved a drone strike that assassinated Iranian General Qasem Soleimani. Pompeo was reportedly among the most hawkish advisors within the administration during the meeting in which Trump decided to assassinate Soleimani. On the day of the strike, Pompeo asserted the attack was ordered by Trump to disrupt an "imminent attack" by Soleimani operatives, although subsequent reports on that rationale were mixed.

In January 2020, Pompeo abruptly ended an interview with Mary Louise Kelly of NPR's All Things Considered, and called her to private quarters where he admonished her for asking questions regarding Ukraine during the interview.

After four-term U.S. senator Pat Roberts of Kansas announced that he would not seek re-election in the 2020 election, Pompeo considered leaving the Trump administration to run for the seat. In June 2020, he ultimately declined to enter the race.

Pompeo praised the Trump-brokered normalization agreement between Israel and the United Arab Emirates as an "enormous" step forward on the "right path". On August 27, 2020, Pompeo, after visiting Omani Sultan Haitham bin Tarik Al-Said, concluded a Middle East trip aimed at encouraging Arab countries to follow the UAE's move. According to Hugh Lovatt of the European Council on Foreign Relations, "... the lack of any additional public commitments during Secretary Pompeo's regional tour looks like an anti-climax [and] it is possible that a lack of clarity on the U.S. commitment to deliver F-35s to the UAE could have also played a part in slowing a second wave of normalization."

In 2020, Pompeo declined to offer U.S. consular protection to Hong Kong democracy activist Joshua Wong, despite appeals from Wong and several members of Congress. While Pompeo had publicly supported Hong Kong's pro-democracy movement, internal State Department discussions concluded that protecting Wong could risk retaliation from Beijing and compromise broader U.S. interests in the region. During a January 2024 House Select Committee on the Chinese Communist Party hearing titled "Authoritarian Alignment: The CCP's Support for America's Adversaries," in response to a question from Rep. Raja Krishnamoorthi about whether he was "personally in favor of" Wong receiving refuge at the time, Pompeo said: "I don't want to talk about the discussions we had inside. I think the United States can always do more whether it's for him, Nathan Law, Jimmy Lai, who's now been prosecuted, the United States can do more and do better to protect these people in their capacity to just do the basic things that every human being is entitled, to speak their mind peaceably."

==== Madison dinners ====
From the time he took office in April 2018 until spring 2020, Pompeo had hosted about two dozen taxpayer-funded "Madison dinners" at the Diplomatic Reception Rooms in the State Department's headquarters) for hundreds of elite attendees. The dinners were not mentioned on Pompeo's public schedule. 14% of the invitees were diplomats or foreign officials while approximately 25% were from—mostly conservative—media or the entertainment industry, 29% from the corporate world, and 30% from U.S. politics or government. Every invited congressional member was a Republican. State Department officials and others raised concerns that the dinners did not serve any foreign policy purpose but were intended for Pompeo to cultivate supporters and donors for future political ambitions, especially since detailed contact information for each attendee was sent to Pompeo's wife's personal email address. Pompeo temporarily suspended the "Madison dinners" when the COVID-19 pandemic hit the U.S., but resumed the dinners at the Blair House in September 2020, despite the controversy over them and concerns about public health.

Records obtained by the watchdog group Citizens for Responsibility and Ethics in Washington (CREW) in 2021 through a Freedom of Information Act (FOIA) lawsuit revealed that the dinners had cost almost $65,000, including more than $10,000 for custom-engraved, Chinese-made pens given as gifts to the attendees. The funds for the dinners were taken from a special appropriation fund for emergencies in the diplomatic service called the K Fund. The Office of the inspector general told CREW that it had not conducted an audit of K Fund expenditures during Pompeo's tenure.

==== Threatening of the International Criminal Court ====
On March 17, 2020, Pompeo threatened two staff members of the International Criminal Court (ICC), Phakiso Mochochoko and ICC prosecutor Fatou Bensouda's in their effort to use the ICC to investigate Americans. Pompeo claimed that they were putting Americans at risk, and intimidated them that the US could act against them, as well as other ICC personnel and their families.

Initially the ICC decision had given a decision to approve an investigation into US crimes in Afghanistan for the victims in the hope of justice on March 5, 2020. Conditions however included restrictions on the issuance of visas on Mike Pompeo´s instruction from the Department of State.

Immediately after the March 5 decision, Pompeo disparaged the court. The ensuing comments against the ICC staffers were even more pointed. These threats were to used to distract from the US´s failure to hold to account perpetrators of torture and other mistreatment in CIA "black sites" throughout Afghanistan, Poland, Romania, and Lithuania where the ICC had the authority to investigate.

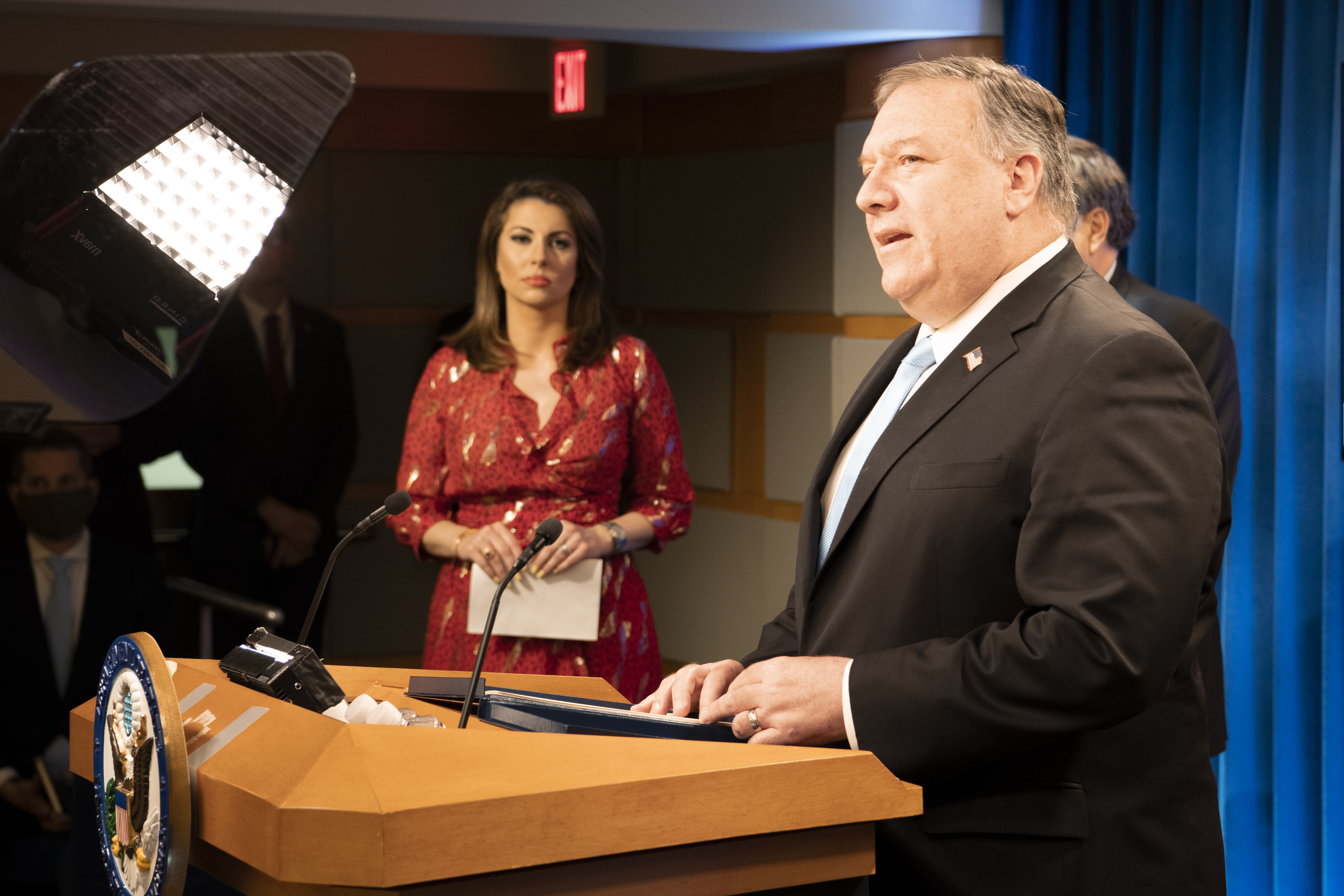
Pompeo holds a news conference on sanctions imposed on the International Criminal Court, June 11, 2020. Executive Order 13928,

Eventually, sanctions were applied to the ICC´s personnel without giving the specific reasons other than that they were "specially designated nationals" which would have categorized them within same groupings of terrorists and narcotics traffickers. On june 11, 2020, Trump issued executive order Executive Order 13928, Blocking Property of Certain Persons Associated With the International Criminal Court. In parallel, while this impeded the ICC investigations in Afghanistan and associated "black site" countries where the Americans had allegedly carried out torture. Concurrently the US also opposed ICC scrutiny of potential Israeli crimes against Palestinians as part of an investigation that also looked into abuses carried out by Israel.

Eventually these sanctions were repealed by the Biden administration though Executive Order 14022, on April 1, 2021.

==== Inspector general investigations ====
After Trump fired the State Department inspector general, Steve Linick in May 2020, it became known that Linick had begun an investigation into ethics violations by Pompeo and his wife alleged by whistle-blowers. The investigation continued after his firing, and the review report was released in April 2021. The review had found more than 100 instances of misconduct where Pompeo requested that State Department staff perform personal errands for him and his wife, "from booking salon appointments and private dinner reservations to picking up their dog and arranging tours for the Pompeos' political allies." The inspector general concluded that the behavior was inconsistent with regulations and "recommended that various divisions at the State Department, such as the Office of the Legal Adviser, update or draft new guidance that establishes or further clarifies the appropriate use of department funds and staffers when it comes to personal tasks."

The inspector general had also investigated Pompeo's role in the Trump administration's decision to declare an "emergency" to bypass a congressional freeze on arms sales to Saudi Arabia and the UAE. Prior to his firing, Linick had requested an interview with Pompeo, which Pompeo had declined. After Linick's firing, it was also revealed that he was investigating claims that a top Pompeo aide had failed to report allegations of workplace violence. Pompeo denied that he sought to fire Linick in retaliation.

==== Impeachment inquiry against Donald Trump ====
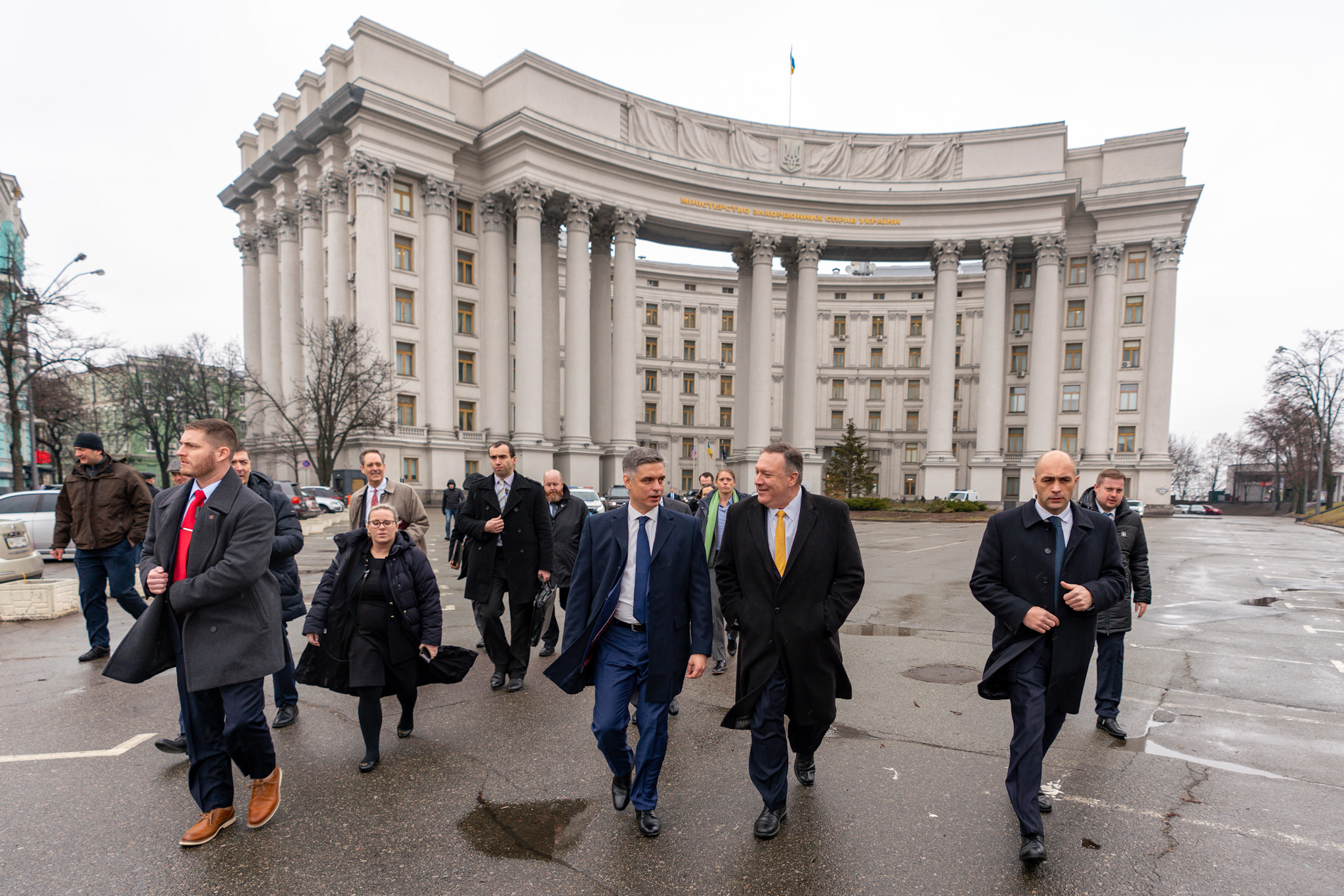
Pompeo with Ukrainian foreign minister Vadym Prystaiko in Kyiv, January 31, 2020

When asked about his knowledge of the controversial call made by President Trump on July 25, 2019, to Ukraine's president Volodymyr Zelenskyy, in which Trump solicited assistance in investigating the son of former vice president and presidential candidate Joe Biden, Pompeo initially said he had little knowledge of Trump's call with Zelenskyy since he had not yet read the transcript of the call. It was later confirmed by officials that he himself had been on the call.

Pompeo informed the chairmen of the House Foreign Affairs Committee, the House Intelligence Committee, and the House Oversight Committee that their subpoenas for documents regarding Trump's communications with the government of Ukraine "can be understood only as an attempt to 'intimidate, bully, and treat improperly, the distinguished professionals of the Department of State'". The three chairmen stated on October 1, 2019, "Any effort to intimidate witnesses or prevent them from talking with Congress—including State Department employees—is illegal and will constitute evidence of obstruction of the impeachment inquiry."

William B. Taylor Jr., acting ambassador to Ukraine and one of several current and former State Department officials appearing before congressional investigators, testified on October 22, 2019, that the White House was withholding military aid to Ukraine to force cooperation on U.S. domestic political issues, that Rudy Giuliani was running a shadow foreign policy effort parallel to official lines in the State Department, that when John Bolton and others fought the "effort to hijack" the U.S. relationship with Ukraine, Pompeo failed to respond directly to complaints, leaving Taylor to conclude that lack of timely, congressionally approved military aid would leave Ukrainians dying at the hands of Russian-led forces.

In his public testimony on November 20, 2019, ambassador to the European Union Gordon Sondland noted in his opening statement that United States Secretary of Energy Rick Perry, then-U.S. ambassador to NATO Kurt Volker and Sondland himself stayed in touch with Rudy Giuliani regarding the president's expectation that a public statement should be made by President Zelenskyy committing Ukraine to look into corruption issues, and that Giuliani "specifically mentioned the 2016 election (including the DNC server) and Burisma as two topics of importance to the President". Sondland said they kept the leadership of the NSC and State Department, including Pompeo, informed about their activities, and that as late as September 24, Pompeo was still telling Volker to talk with Giuliani.

An October 23, 2019, Freedom of Information Act (FOIA) request by the liberal watchdog group American Oversight persuaded a federal judge to give the State Department 30 days to release Ukraine-related records, including communications between Pompeo and President Trump's personal attorney, Rudy Giuliani. On November 22, the State Department released internal emails and documents bolstering Sondland's congressional testimony that Pompeo had participated in Giuliani's activities relating to Ukraine. Pompeo and Giuliani exchanged emails and phone calls in late March 2019, before Ambassador Marie Yovanovitch was recalled from Ukraine. The documents also showed that the State Department had deliberately deceived Congress about the rationale for Marie Yovanovitch's removal as ambassador to Ukraine. Giuliani later admitted he had spoken to Pompeo on the phone in late March 2019 "to relay information he had gathered during his Ukrainian research". Upon Pompeo's request, he then provided him memos of his interviews of two former Ukrainian prosecutors. Giuliani said he later heard that the details of the memos were passed on to the State Department inspector general (IG) and the FBI for investigation.

On November 26, 2019, Pompeo appeared to grant legitimacy to a debunked conspiracy theory that Ukraine, rather than or in addition to Russia, was behind interference in the 2016 United States elections. He had been asked by a reporter "Do you believe that the U.S. and Ukraine should investigate the theory that it was Ukraine and not Russia that hacked the DNC emails in 2016?" Pompeo responded "Any time there is information that indicates any country has messed with American elections, we not only have a right but a duty to make sure we chase that down," adding "to protect our elections, America should leave no stone unturned."

==== COVID-19 pandemic ====
Pompeo said the U.S. government is trying to determine if the COVID-19 virus emanated from the Wuhan Institute of Virology. On April 23, 2020, Pompeo claimed that China had denied U.S. scientists permission to enter the country, in an effort to ascertain the origin of the current pandemic. He did not give details of any requests for such visits. On May 13, 2020, Pompeo made a swift visit to Israel for his first trip overseas since the outbreak of the coronavirus pandemic.

During a spike in case and death numbers in the pandemic, Pompeo hosted large indoor holiday parties involving hundreds of guests, as well as alcohol and food. The parties violated public health guidance and were described as superspreader events. They also violated Washington D.C.'s restrictions on sizable indoor gatherings. At the same time, the State Department was advising its employees not to have in-person gatherings. Photos from the event showed attendees not wearing masks consistently. In mid-December 2020, hundreds of invitees rejected invitations to go to one of Pompeo's parties. A day later, Pompeo cancelled the final holiday party after he had come in contact with a COVID-19 positive individual.

==== 2019 emergency arms sale ====
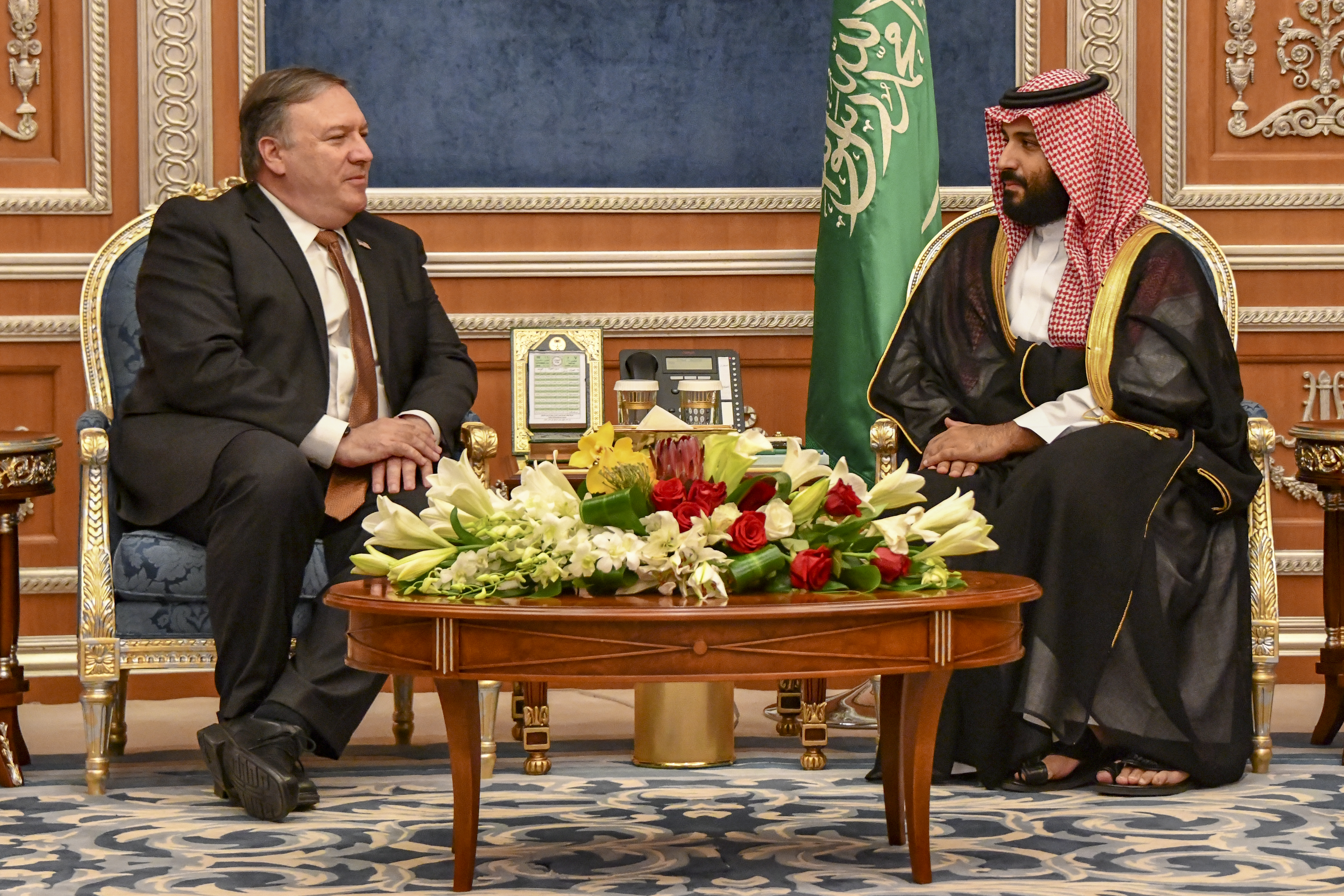
Pompeo with Saudi crown prince Mohammad bin Salman in October 2018

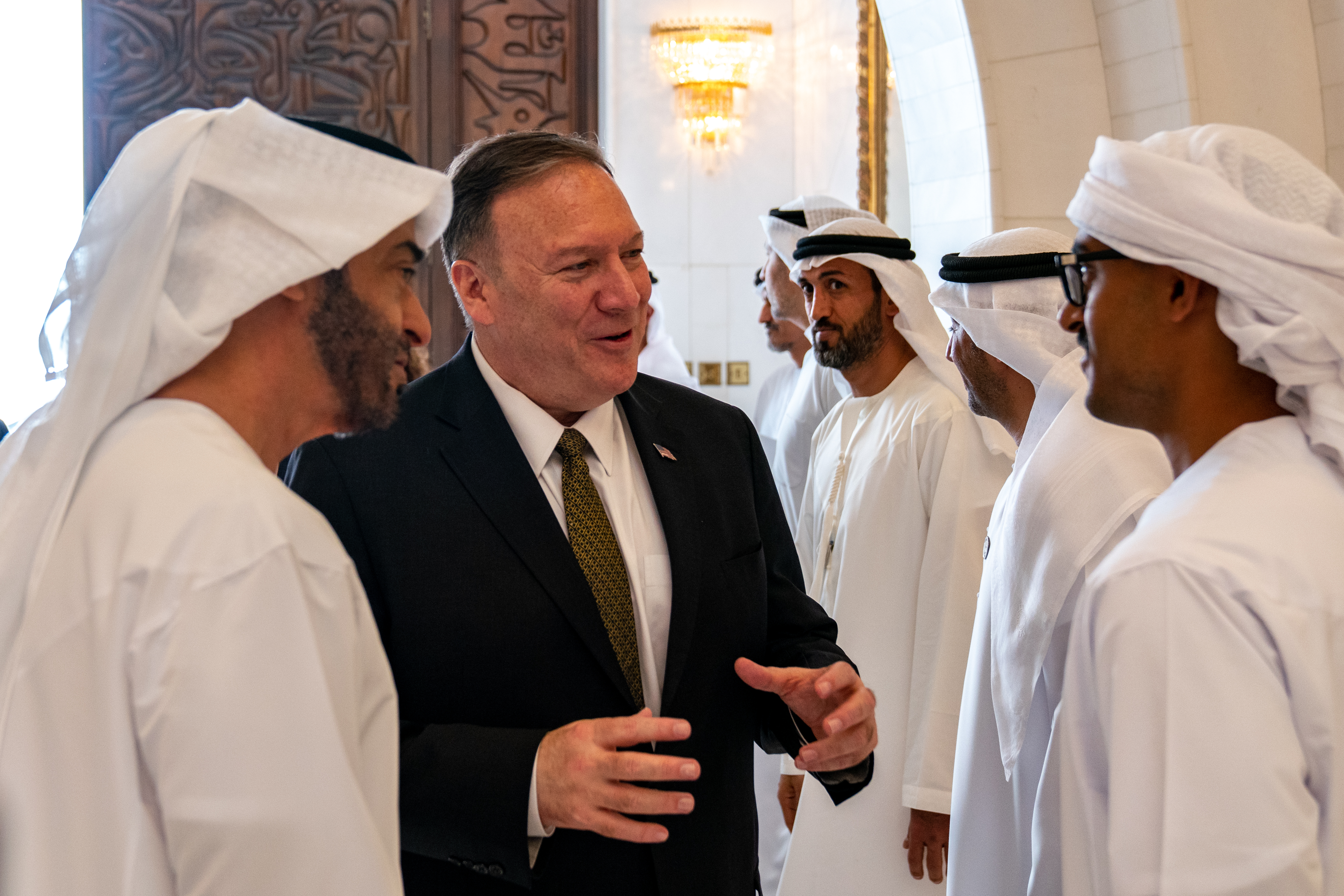
Pompeo with Crown Prince Mohammed bin Zayed Al Nahyan in Abu Dhabi, September 2019

In May 2019, Pompeo announced an "emergency" to push through $8.1 billion of arms sales to Saudi Arabia and the United Arab Emirates, citing Iranian activity in the Middle East. This led to widespread congressional opposition, given the Saudi-led intervention in the Yemeni civil war that contributed to a humanitarian crisis in Yemen. The emergency arms sale triggered a probe by then-State Department inspector general Steve Linick, into the propriety of the arms sale. Pompeo refused to be interviewed by Linick, who was also leading a separate Office of Inspector General (OIG) investigation into whether Pompeo and his wife used official resources for personal business.

In May 2020, Trump fired Inspector General Linick at Pompeo's recommendation. The firing was scrutinized by Congress, and in June 2020, Linick testified that Brian Bulatao, a senior State Department appointee and Pompeo ally, attempted to "bully" and improperly pressure him into halting the investigation. Stephen Akard, who became acting IG upon Linick's firing, resigned in August 2020. A week later, OIG issued a report following the investigation into emergency arms sales; the report found that Pompeo did not violate any procedures in declaring the "emergency" but also determined that the State Department had failed to fully consider the humanitarian impact of the arms sale to Saudi Arabia and the UAE, including the Gulf Arab states' use of U.S. bombs in Yemen, killing thousands of civilians. The State Department leadership, in a statement issued after the OIG report was released, hailed the former finding, but made not mention of the latter finding.

==== Republican National Convention speech ====
On August 25, 2020, Pompeo recorded a speech during an official diplomatic visit to Jerusalem, during the Republican National Convention, in support of the incumbent and Republican presidential nominee Donald Trump. The speech broke precedent, which established that State Department employees and leaders do not speak at political party events. Four days before the speech, Pompeo announced a change to longstanding State Department policy to allow the speech, but specified that the change was a special exceptions that applied only to him. Pompeo made the change to the department's rule—allowing the Secretary of State to speak to "political party convention when requested by or for the President"—against the advice of the State Department's senior legal advisers.

Following the speech, the House Foreign Affairs Committee's Oversight Subcommittee announced an investigation into whether the speech constituted a violation of the Hatch Act, which restricts executive branch civil service employees from participating in certain forms of political activity. A spokesperson for Pompeo said that the department was not bearing any of the costs of the speech and that Pompeo spoke in his "personal capacity. After the speech, Eliot Engel, chairman of the Foreign Affairs Committee announced that the committee would draft resolution holding Pompeo in contempt, saying "he has demonstrated alarming disregard for the laws and rules governing his own conduct and for the tools the constitution provides to prevent government corruption." The Oversight Subcommittee Chairman, Joaquin Castro, said the "likely unprecedented" speech "may also be illegal."

The Office of the Special Counsel launched a probe into Pompeo's speech, and in November 2021, the Office released a report concluding that Pompeo was one of at least 13 senior Trump administration officials who violated the Hatch Act. The office found that Pompeo had known of the Hatch Act's restrictions before giving the speech and had ignored advice from State Department personnel on "how to comply with the Hatch Act when delivering the speech."

==== Afghanistan and the Taliban ====
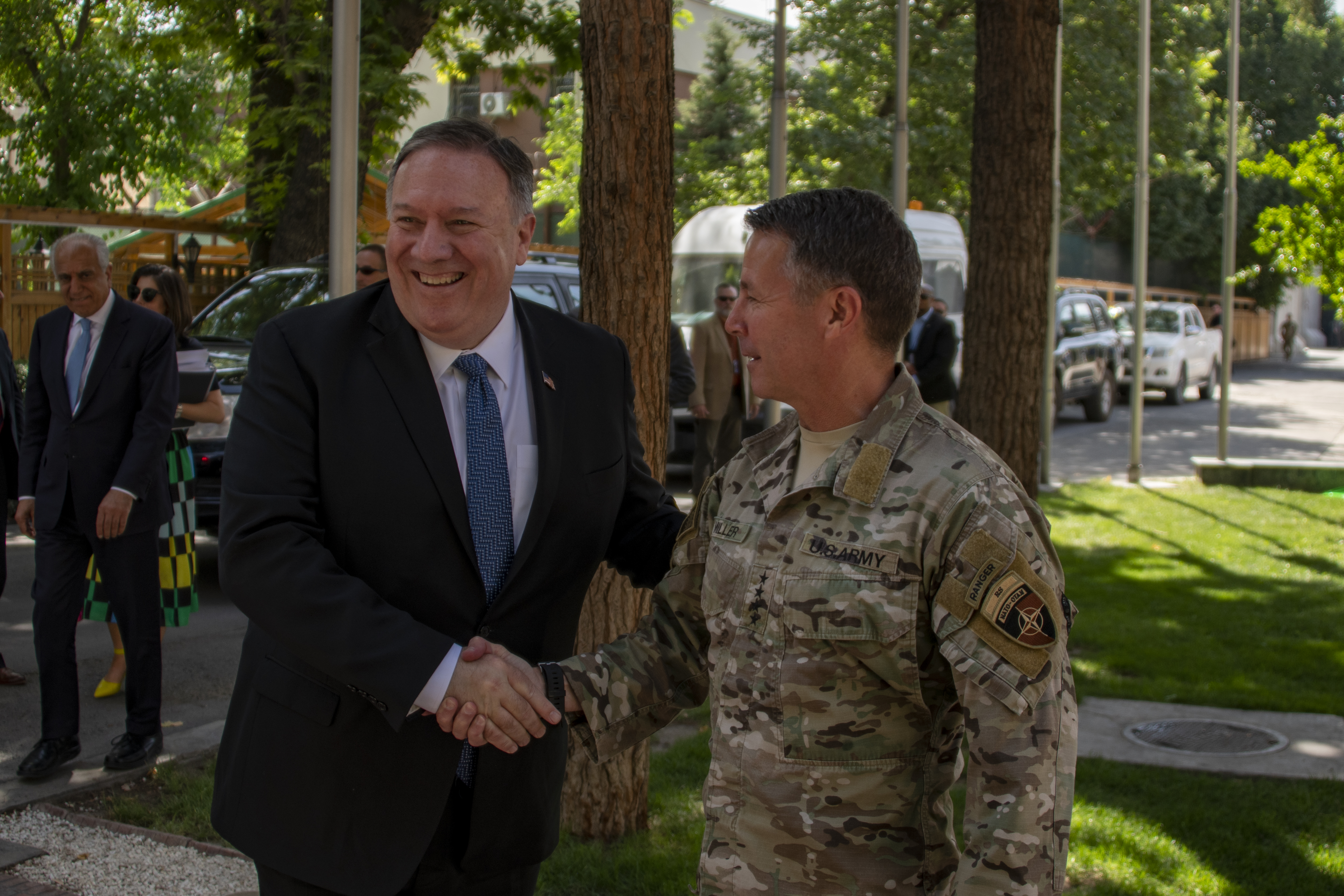
Pompeo with General Austin S. Miller in Kabul on June 25, 2019

Pompeo was involved in negotiations with the Taliban that set the stage for a U.S. departure from Afghanistan. In early 2020, Pompeo touted the Trump administration's agreement with the Taliban that put the U.S. on a trajectory to leave Afghanistan by May 2021. The deal required the Afghan government to release 5,000 imprisoned Taliban members. By August 2020, the Afghan government released all but 400 of the prisoners, as these prisoners had been accused of committing major crimes, according to the Council on Foreign Relations. Pompeo urged the Afghan government to release the remaining prisoners to remove "the last obstacle to the start of intra-Afghan negotiations". Within three days, Afghan president Ashraf Ghani agreed to the release, which was completed the next month.

==== Final days in office ====
After Joe Biden won the 2020 United States presidential election and Trump refused to concede while making false claims of fraud, Pompeo, when asked whether there would be a "smooth transition" to the Biden administration, responded on November 10, 2020: "There will be a smooth transition to a second Trump administration, all right. We're ready. The world is watching what's taking place here. We're gonna count all the votes. When the process is complete, they'll be electors selected."

The day after a pro-Trump mob stormed the U.S. Capitol to prevent the counting of the electoral votes (thus formalizing the upcoming presidency of Biden), the State Department told diplomats to affirm Biden's victory. On January 8, Pompeo met with Biden's incoming secretary of state Antony Blinken. While other Trump Cabinet members resigned or took a low profile after the attack on the Capitol, in which Trump's role was debated, Pompeo remained a vocal defender of Trump, sending a Twitter message that promoted him as a potential Nobel Peace Prize nominee. He urged followers of the State Department's Twitter account to follow his personal account; criticized the news media, and complained about purported "censorship" of conservatives on social media websites.

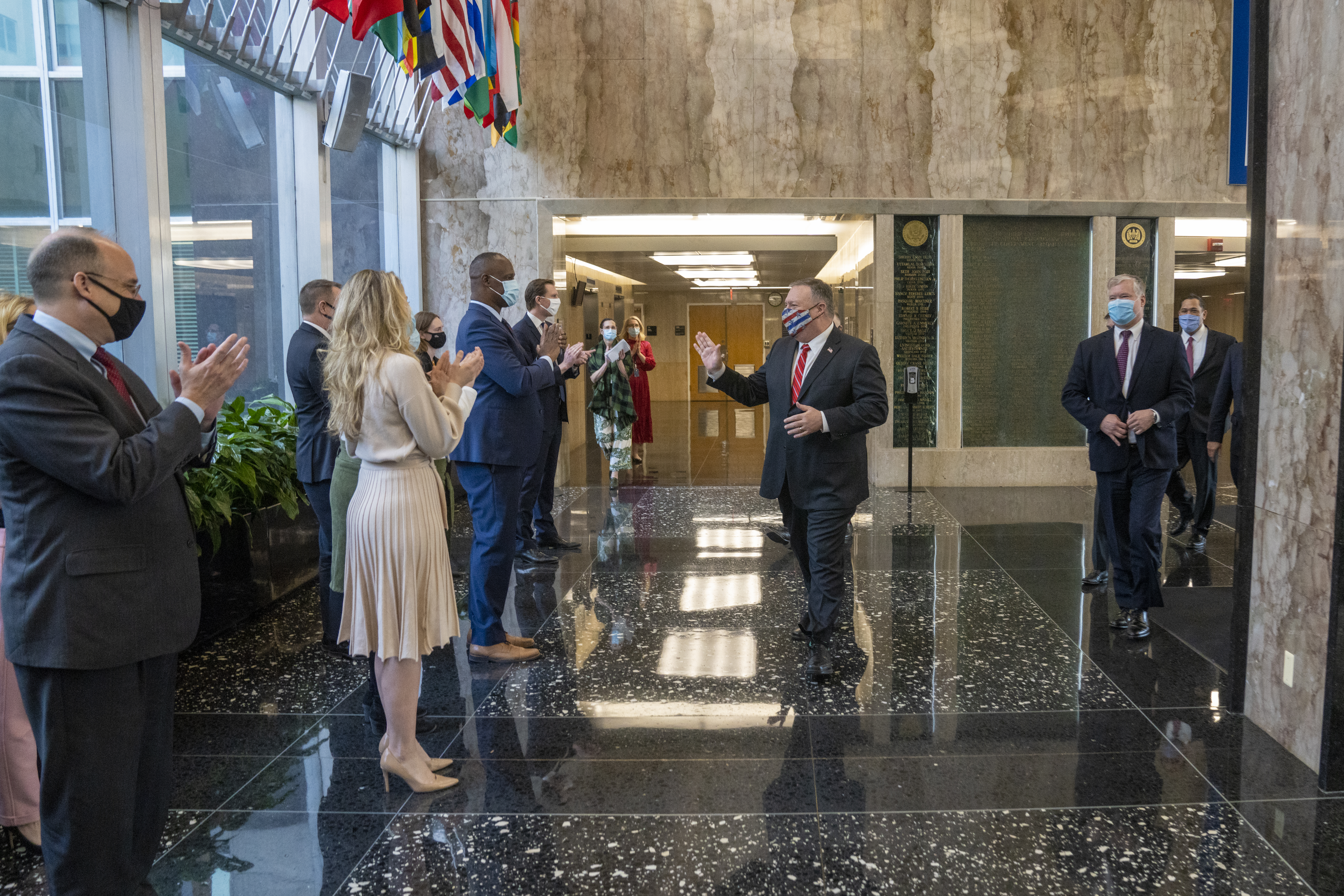
Pompeo departs the Department of State on January 20, 2021.

On January 12, 2021, Pompeo cancelled a planned European trip when European diplomats declined to meet with him.

Pompeo made a large number of foreign policy decisions during the lame duck period of the Trump administration in the weeks leading up to the inauguration of Joe Biden, including many likely to be reversed under Biden. Pompeo ordered the re-designation of Cuba as a "state sponsor of terrorism" and the designation of the Houthi rebels as a "foreign terrorist organization". The latter decision indirectly reduced humanitarian aid to Yemeni people, and it was quickly reversed by the Biden administration.

On January 19, 2021, Pompeo announced that the Department of State had determined that "genocide and crimes against humanity" had been perpetrated by China against the Uyghur Muslims and other ethnic minorities in Xinjiang. The announcement was made on the last full day of the presidency of Donald Trump. On January 20, 2021, Pompeo and several other Trump administration officials were sanctioned by China. In a statement, the Ministry of Foreign Affairs of China stated that it had decided to sanction those "who have seriously violated China's sovereignty and who have been mainly responsible for such U.S. moves on China-related issues." The targeted individuals and their immediate family members were banned from entering mainland China, Hong Kong and Macau, and were also restricted from doing business with China either individually or through their companies and institutions. President Biden's National Security Council called the sanctions "unproductive and cynical".

== Post-Trump administration (2021–present) ==
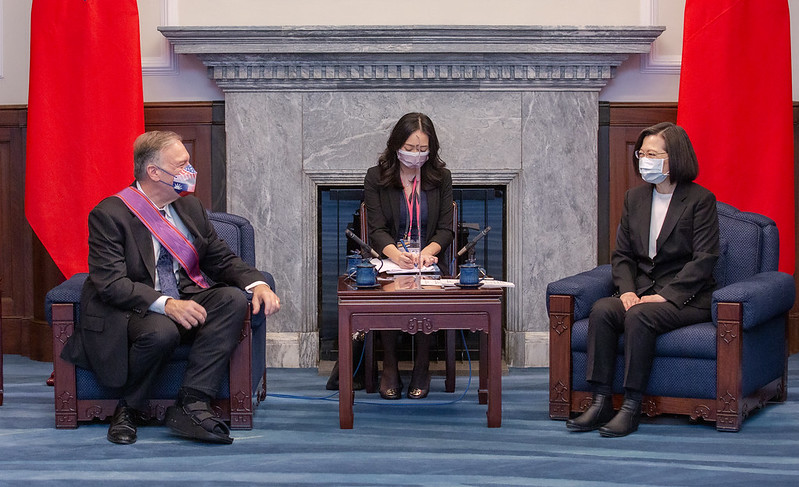
Pompeo meeting with President of Taiwan Tsai Ing-wen in Taipei, March 2022

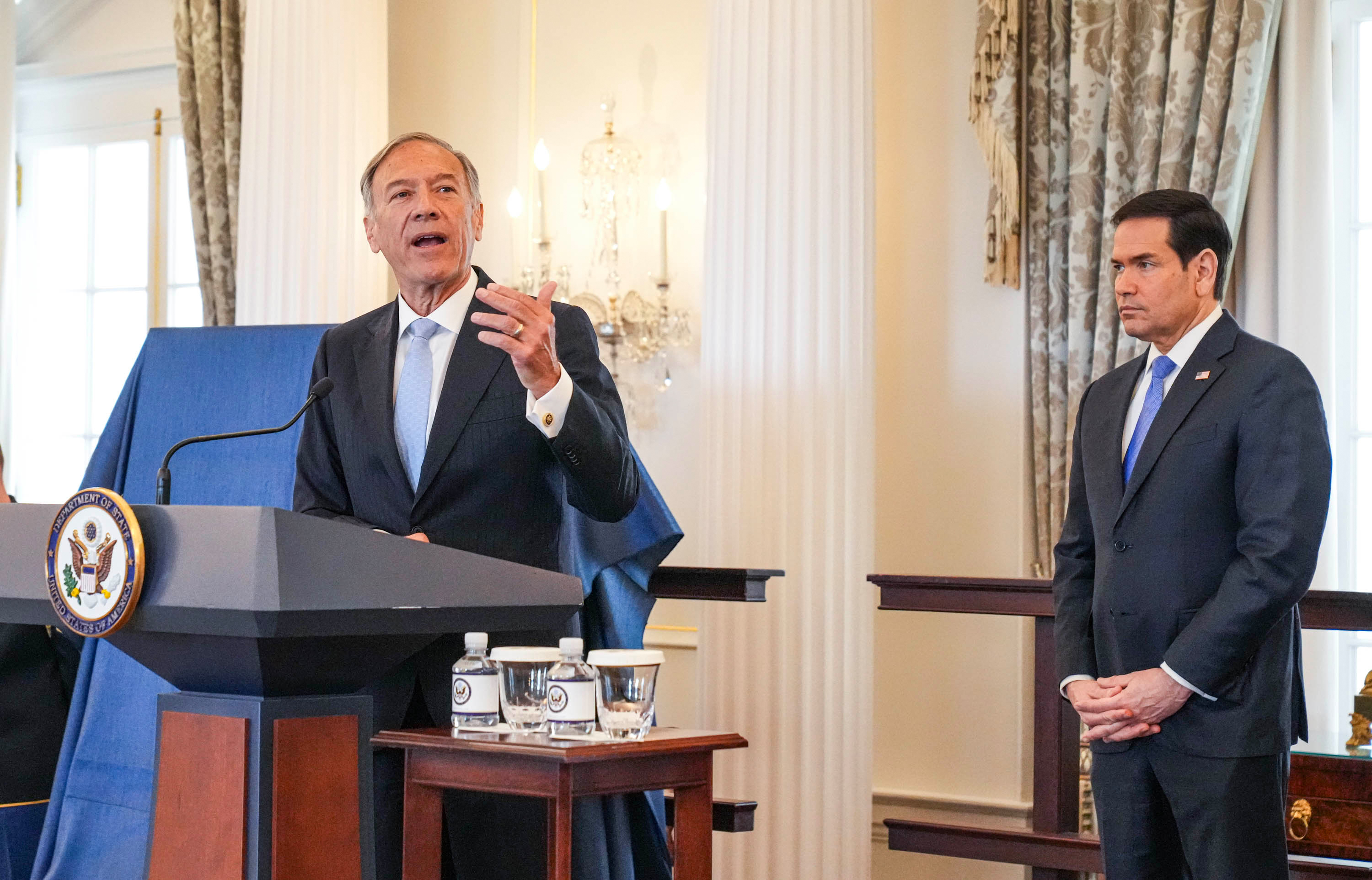
Pompeo and Secretary of State Marco Rubio, April 2026

In January 2021, Pompeo joined the Hudson Institute as a distinguished fellow. As of June 2025, he is no longer listed on the Hudson Institute website.

In June 2021, Pompeo founded the Champion American Values PAC (CAVPAC). In June 2024, Pompeo launched the Pompeo Foundation by creating an account on X and registering for 501(c)3 status. A website, PompeoFoundation.com, was launched in 2025.

Pompeo expressed support for the Biden administration's extension of the withdrawal timeline of U.S. troops from Afghanistan to August 2021. He ultimately distanced himself and the Trump administration from the situation facing Afghanistan post-withdrawal, following the fall of Kabul to the Taliban.

Pompeo was paid by the Taiwanese government-affiliated think tank Prospect Foundation to deliver a speech on March 4, 2022. Reporting of Pompeo's pay varied, with $150,000 being the most commonly reported figure. In his speech, Pompeo called on the United States to recognize the Republic of China as an independent and sovereign country.

In August 2022, it emerged that Pompeo was the target of an alleged plot by Iran to assassinate him, and other officials.

In January 2023, HarperCollins published Pompeo's memoir of his tenure in the Trump administration, Never Give an Inch: Fighting for the America I Love.

Pompeo considered a candidacy for the 2024 Republican presidential nomination and toured early primary states, but ultimately announced his decision not to run in April 2023.

Alongside David M. Friedman, Pompeo featured in the 2023 documentary Route 60: The Biblical Highway, directed by Matt Crouch.

In 2023, Pompeo joined the board of directors of Cyabra, an Israeli disinformation company which has recorded a 20% revenue growth in recent years.

In October 2023, Pompeo became Of counsel for Texas-based law firm Oberheiden, P.C., a federal criminal defense law firm, joining former US Congressman Trey Gowdy and former Director of National Intelligence John Ratcliffe.

After Trump's victory in the 2024 election, he declared that Pompeo and Nikki Haley would "not be invited to join" his next administration. According to The Wall Street Journal, Tucker Carlson and Donald Trump Jr. played a key role in blocking Pompeo's return; Carlson argued that Pompeo was a "warmonger". On January 22, 2025, President Trump revoked Pompeo's security detail.

In February 2025, Pompeo was hired by Columbia University as a distinguished fellow at its Institute of Global Politics to teach a course on diplomacy, decision-making, and organizational leadership. Pompeo said that he suspected he was hired because Columbia was "seeking to bring onto campus…someone with a view that is very different than most of the faculty on their staff."

In June 2025, The Washington Post, citing intelligence sources, reported that Iranian operatives came close to assassinating Pompeo during his visit to Paris in 2022. According to the report, the operation was part of a broader Iranian campaign to target former senior U.S. officials involved in the 2020 killing of Quds Force commander Qasem Soleimani. While the plot ultimately failed, sources revealed that Iranian agents had come alarmingly close to executing the plan on European soil.

In November 2025, Pompeo joined the advisory board of Ukrainian defence technology company Fire Point which specializes in the development and production of long-range strike drones.

== Political positions ==
=== Foreign policy ===
In 2013, Pompeo supported the surveillance programs of the National Security Agency, referring to the agency's efforts as "good and important work". In 2016 Pompeo stated, "Congress should pass a law re-establishing collection of all metadata, and combining it with publicly available financial and lifestyle information into a comprehensive, searchable database. Legal and bureaucratic impediments to surveillance should be removed. That includes Presidential Policy Directive-28, which bestows privacy rights on foreigners and imposes burdensome requirements to justify data collection." In March 2017, WikiLeaks began publishing a series of documents known as Vault 7, detailing the CIA's electronic surveillance and cyber warfare activities and capabilities. In an April 2017 speech addressing the Center for Strategic and International Studies, Pompeo called WikiLeaks "a non-state hostile intelligence service" and described its founder, Julian Assange, as a "narcissist" and "a fraud—a coward hiding behind a screen". In 2022 a lawsuit was filed against Pompeo and other defendants alleging that they have illegally placed Assange and his guests under surveillance.

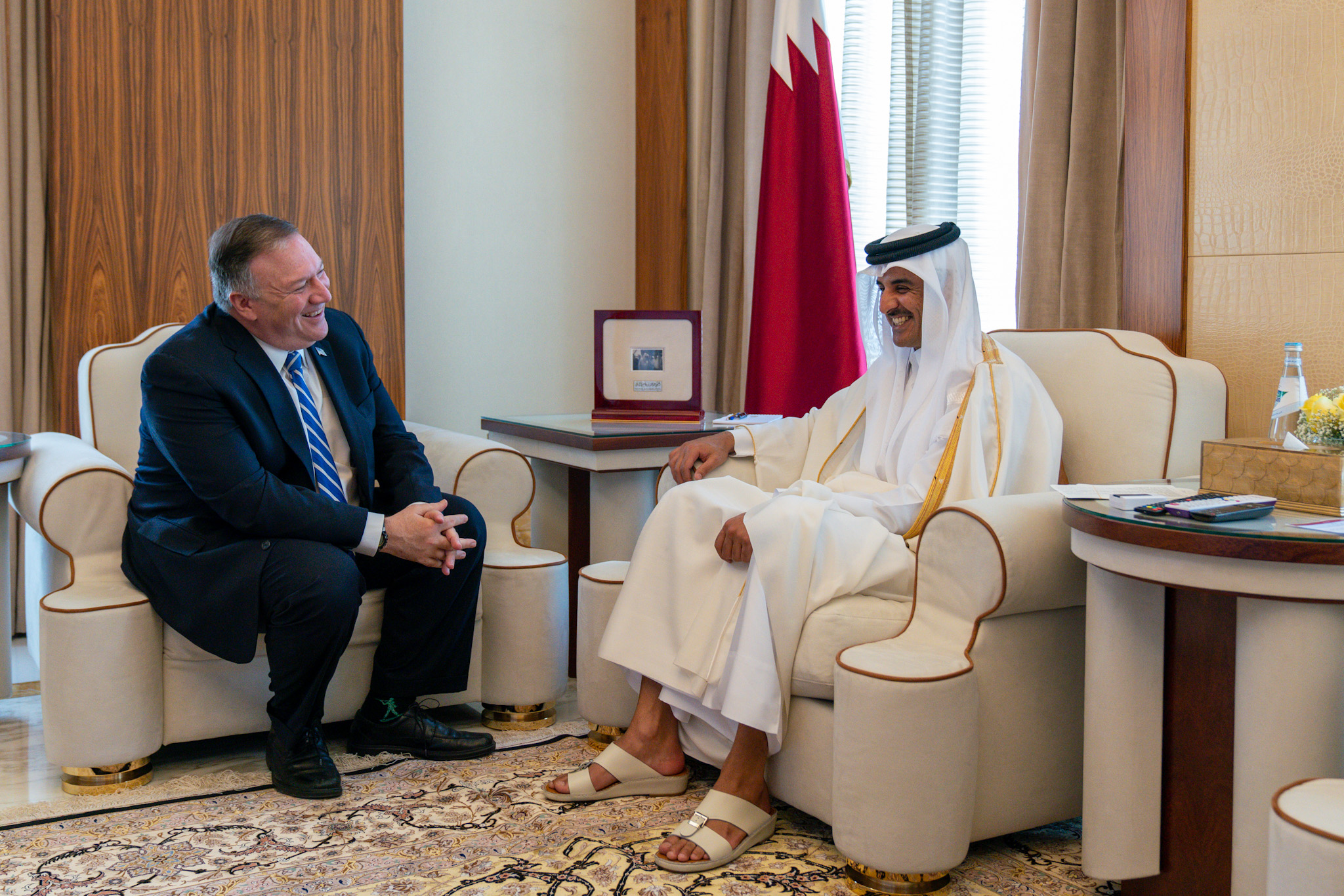
Pompeo with Qatar's emir Tamim bin Hamad Al Thani in Doha, Qatar, February 2020

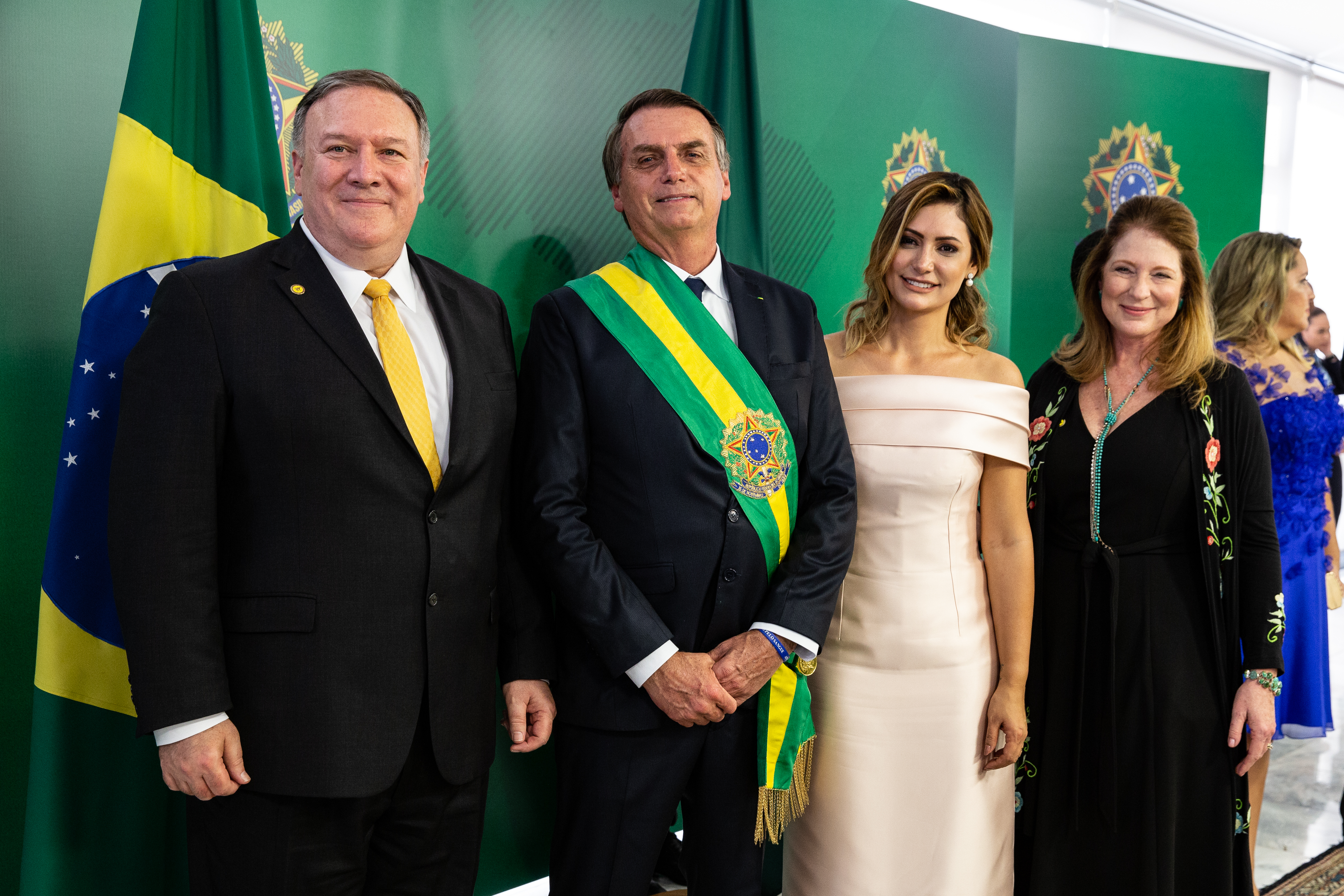
Pompeo with Brazilian president Jair Bolsonaro in January 2019

In a 2013 speech on the House floor, Pompeo said Muslim leaders who fail to denounce acts of terrorism done in the name of Islam are "potentially complicit" in the attacks. The Council on American–Islamic Relations called on him to revise his remarks, calling them "false and irresponsible". In 2016, ACT for America gave Pompeo a "national security eagle award" for his comments on Islam. Pompeo has been a frequent guest on anti-Muslim activist Frank Gaffney's radio show for the Center for Security Policy. As a congressman, he cosponsored legislation to add the Muslim Brotherhood to the United States State Department list of Foreign Terrorist Organizations.

Pompeo opposed closing the Guantanamo Bay detention camp. After a 2013 visit to the prison, he said, of the prisoners who were on hunger strike, "It looked to me like a lot of them had put on weight." He criticized the Obama administration's decision to end secret prisons and its requirement that all interrogators adhere to anti-torture laws.

In March 2014, he denounced the inclusion of a telecast by Edward Snowden at the South by Southwest conference in Austin, Texas, and asked that it be cancelled, predicting it would encourage "lawless behavior" among attendees. In February 2016, Pompeo said Snowden "should be brought back from Russia and given due process, and I think the proper outcome would be that he would be given a death sentence." But he has spoken in favor of reforming the Federal Records Act, one of the laws under which Snowden was charged, saying, "I'm not sure there's a whole lot of change that needs to happen to the Espionage Act. The Federal Records Act clearly needs updating to reflect the different ways information is communicated and stored. Given the move in technology and communication methods, I think it's probably due for an update."

On July 21, 2015, Pompeo and Senator Tom Cotton alleged the existence of secret side agreements between Iran and the International Atomic Energy Agency (IAEA) on procedures for inspection and verification of Iran's nuclear activities under the Joint Comprehensive Plan of Action. Obama administration officials acknowledged the existence of agreements between Iran and the IAEA governing the inspection of sensitive military sites but denied that they were "secret side deals", calling them standard practice in crafting arms-control pacts and saying the administration had provided information about them to Congress.

In November 2015, Pompeo visited Israel and said, "Prime Minister [Benjamin] Netanyahu is a true partner of the American people." He supported Trump's 2017 decision to move America's embassy in Israel to Jerusalem.

In 2017, Pompeo worked to undermine the Joint Comprehensive Plan of Action nuclear deal with Iran (which had been negotiated by the Obama administration) saying, "I look forward to rolling back this disastrous deal with the world's largest state sponsor of terrorism." He also said a better option than negotiating with Iran would be to use "under 2,000 sorties to destroy the Iranian nuclear capacity. This is not an insurmountable task for the coalition forces."

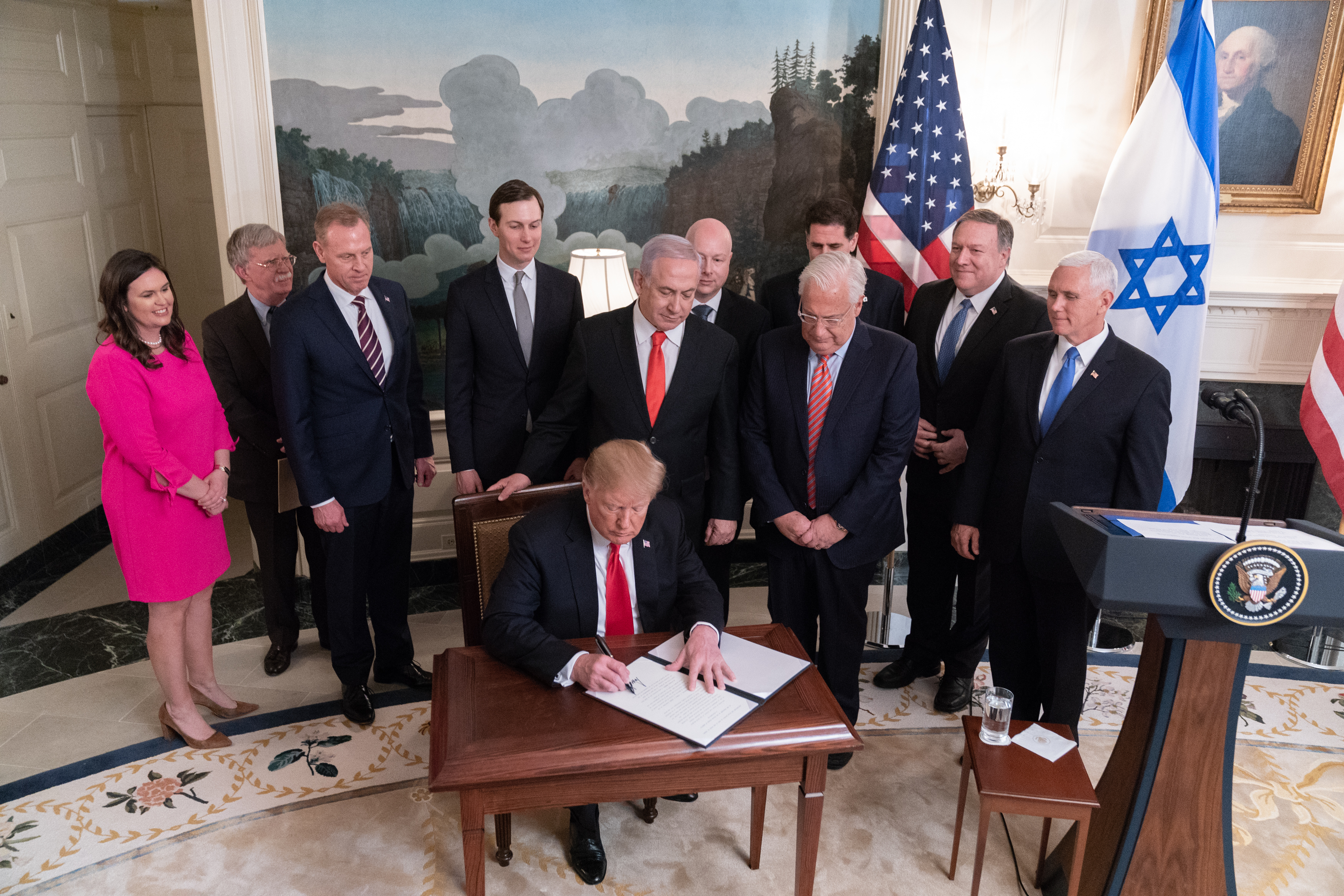
President Trump, joined by Pompeo and Netanyahu behind, signs the proclamation recognizing Israel's 1981 annexation of the Golan Heights, March 25, 2019

In 2017, it was reported that Pompeo had expressed desire for regime change in North Korea. In July 2017, he said "It would be a great thing to denuclearize the peninsula, to get those weapons off of that, but the thing that is most dangerous about it is the character who holds the control over them today."

In September 2018, Pompeo "backed continued U.S. military support for Saudi Arabia's war in Yemen over the objections of staff members after being warned that a cutoff could jeopardize $2 billion in weapons sales to America's Gulf allies, according to a classified memo and people familiar with the decision".

In November 2018, Pompeo blamed Iran for the humanitarian crisis in Yemen, saying, "Iran causes death and destruction inside of Yemen and does nothing to prevent the starvation," while Saudi Arabia has "provided millions and millions of dollars of humanitarian relief" for Yemen.

Israel

Pompeo has consistently expressed strong support for Israel, describing it as a major ally of the United States and an anchor of regional stability. He has advocated for close US—Israel relations and supported Israel's security policies. Pompeo has repeatedly affirmed Israel's right to defend itself, condemned Hamas, and stressed the importance of maintaining strong deterrence against hostile actors in the Middle East, while criticizing policies he believes undermine Israel' security. He has also criticized moves by countries such as Britain, Portugal, France, Canada, and Australia to recognize a "so-called Palestinian state" and called it "nothing short of perverse". He contended that such recognition will prolong the suffering of the people of Gaza rather than securing peace in the region. Furthermore, Pompeo has expressed a negative view of the Boycott Divestment and Sanctions (BDS) movement, arguing that is unfairly targets Israel and should be regarded as antisemitic.

While being interviewed on a podcast in 2023, Pompeo has argued that Israel's long-standing control of the West Bank and Gaza should not be described as an occupation, claiming that Israel has biblical and historical ties to the land. He made several striking statements during the interview, including calling Palestinian president Mahmoud Abbas a "known terrorist".

==== China ====
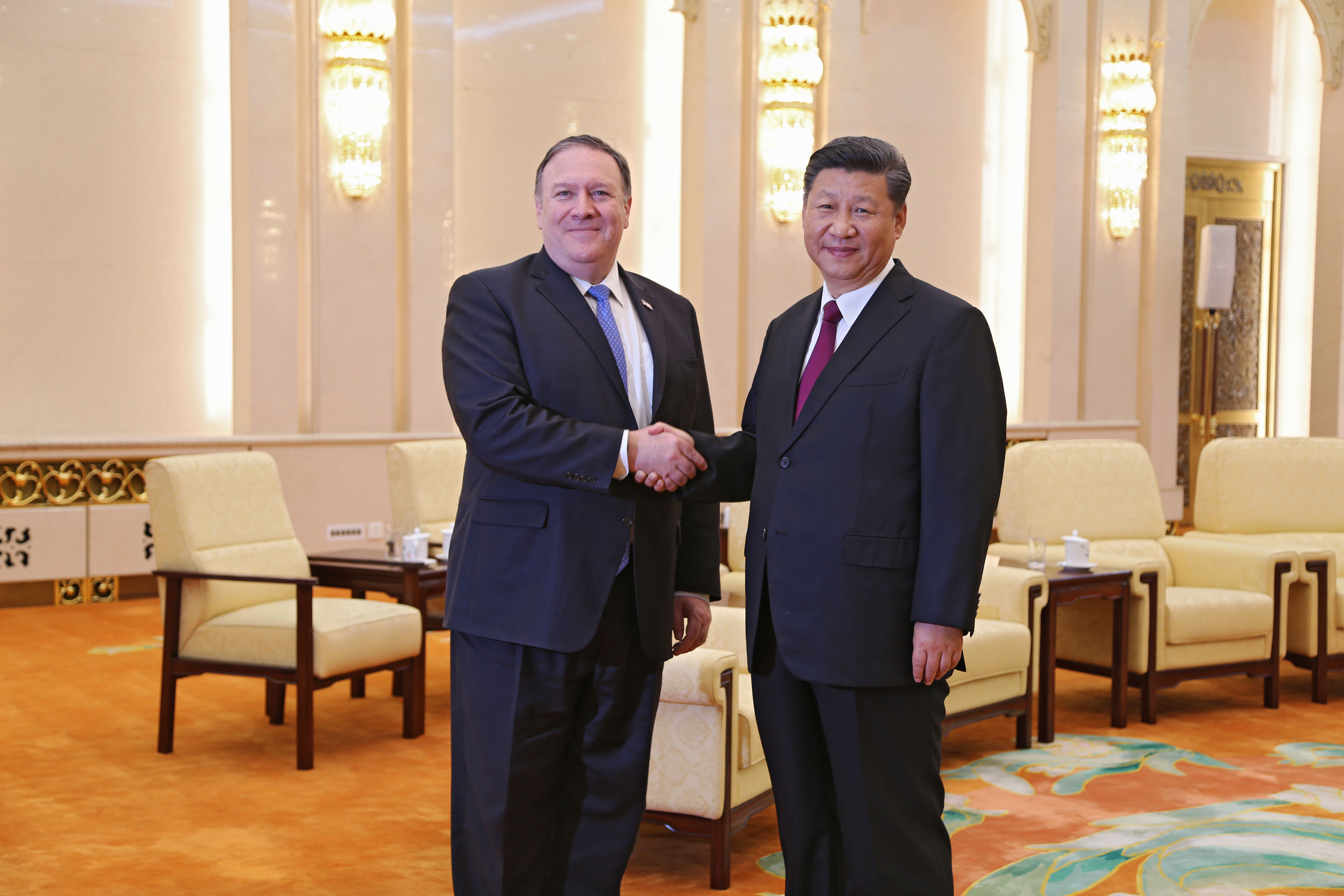
Pompeo and Chinese Communist Party general secretary and Chinese president Xi Jinping

During his tenure as secretary of state, Pompeo was an outspoken critic of China. Pompeo suggested that Chinese investment in Israel would create issues between the U.S. and Israel, and threatened to reduce security arrangements between the countries, although he also claimed that he would have no problems with open and transparent investments. He accused the World Health Organization of being under control of the People's Republic of China and implicated China as being behind the significant number of deaths in the UK as a result of the COVID-19 pandemic. He praised the UK when they started to push back against the Chinese Communist Party and its General Secretary Xi Jinping, especially with respect to Huawei. He also said he preferred a new coalition that did not need to go through established institutions that were set up by the United States, such as the United Nations. He argued that China was a "new tyranny" and it was the duty of "every leader of every nation" to stand up to China.

Pompeo has also argued that China's claims and activities in the South China Sea were illegal. In addition he said the Chinese authorities were not allowed to take unilateral action in the area. Michael Hirson, at Eurasia Group, argued that Pompeo was calling for regime change. He called on the Chinese people to betray their government and rise up to change the Chinese Communist Party.

On July 23, 2020, Pompeo, during his Communist China and the Free World's Future speech, announced the end of what he called "blind engagement" with the Chinese government. He also criticized Chinese Communist Party general secretary Xi Jinping as "a true believer in a bankrupt totalitarian ideology".

The former assistant secretary of state for East Asian and Pacific affairs, Daniel Russel, argued that it would have "the opposite effect, in bolstering support in China for Xi Jinping and deepening anger towards the United States". Michael Hirson noted that with the 2020 U.S. presidential election nearing, it was unlikely Chinese policymakers would do anything to change their relationship.

In September 2020, Pompeo accused the Chinese government of trying to foment racial unrest in the United States during an address to state lawmakers in Wisconsin.

In October 2020, Donald Trump was diagnosed with COVID-19, and Pompeo cancelled scheduled visits to South Korea and Mongolia. However, he still held a meeting with the foreign ministers of Quad allies Australia, India and Japan, during which he accused the Chinese Communist Party of "exploitation, corruption and coercion".

==== Taiwan ====
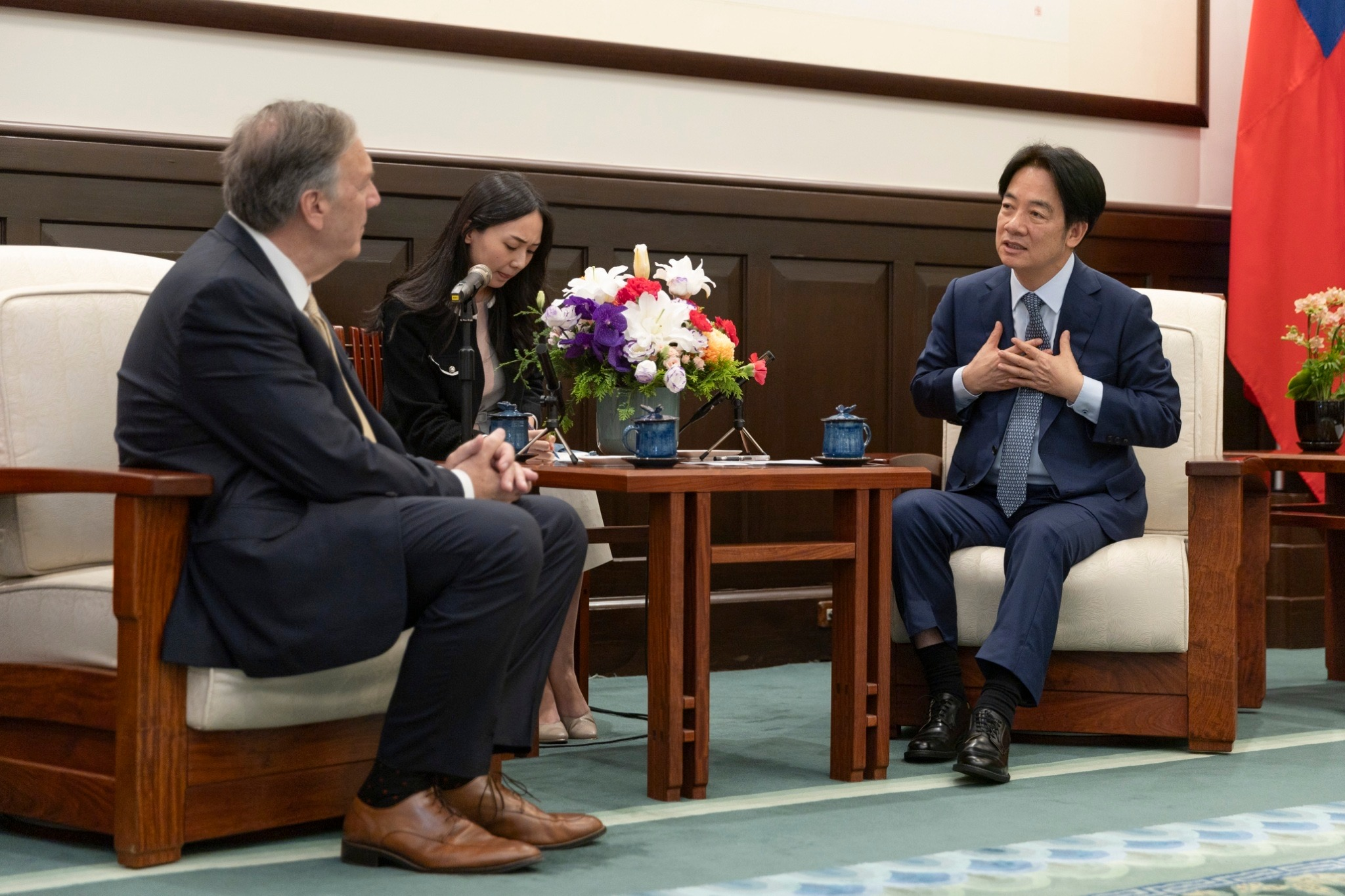
Pompeo with Taiwanese President William Lai in May 2024. Pompeo supports official U.S. recognition of Taiwan as a sovereign country.

Visiting Taipei in 2022, Pompeo said that the U.S. should recognize the Republic of China (Taiwan) as an independent country. He returned to Taiwan in May 2024, as part of the American delegation to the inauguration of President William Lai. Pompeo met with Lai the following day, reiterating his support for official U.S. recognition of the country.

==== Russia ====
During his confirmation hearing, Pompeo said Russia "has reasserted itself aggressively, invading and occupying Ukraine, threatening Europe, and doing nearly nothing to aid in the destruction and defeat of ISIS".

In August 2018, Pompeo called Russia to "immediately release" jailed Ukrainian filmmaker Oleg Sentsov.

In February 2022, right before Russia invaded Ukraine, Pompeo gave an interview in which he praised Russian president Vladimir Putin. Russian state television aired the interview. Pompeo's comments reflected comments made by Trump after the invasion praising Putin. The same month, during a speech at the Conservative Political Action Conference, Pompeo called Putin a "dictator" over the invasion, though also stated that he continued to believe that China was a greater national security threat to the United States than Russia.

During a speech at the Hudson Institute in June 2022, Pompeo described the Russian invasion of Ukraine as a "planned genocide" designed to create a "new Russian Empire" similar to the Soviet Union with large amounts of energy reserves.

=== Energy and environment ===
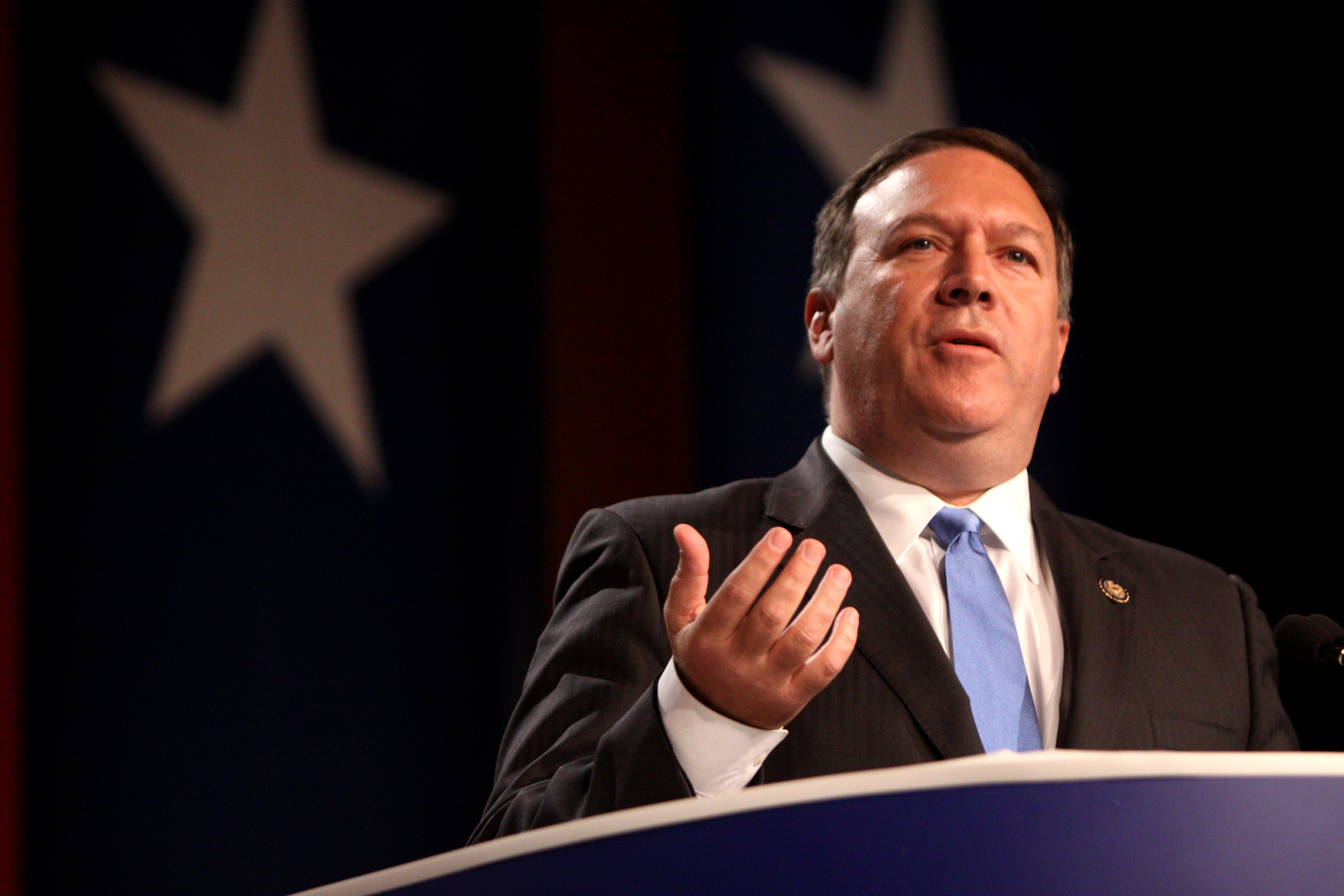
Pompeo at the Values Voter Summit in Washington, D.C.

Speaking about climate change in 2013, Pompeo said: "There are scientists who think lots of different things about climate change. There's some who think we're warming, there's some who think we're cooling, there's some who think that the last 16 years have shown a pretty stable climate environment." He has said, "Federal policy should be about the American family, not worshipping a radical environmental agenda." In 2009 Pompeo signed the No Climate Tax pledge of Americans for Prosperity. He called the Obama administration's environment and climate change plans "damaging" and "radical". In 2012 he called for the permanent elimination of wind power production tax credits, calling them an "enormous government handout".

In 2015, Pompeo opposed the regulation of greenhouse gas emissions by the United States and supported eliminating the United States federal register of greenhouse gas emissions. As a member of the United States House Committee on Energy and Commerce, he voted for two resolutions disapproving of the Clean Power Plan implemented by the United States Environmental Protection Agency during the Obama administration.

In May 2019, Pompeo acted against environmental protection at the Arctic Council. He refused to sign on to a joint statement addressing the need for protection of the Arctic region from the threat of rapidly melting ice unless all mentions of climate change were removed from the document. He said, "Climate change is actually good for the Arctic, since melting ice caps are 'opening up new shipping routes' and thus making it more economically viable to expand oil drilling in the region."

He described the Paris climate accord, along with the World Health Organization and Human Rights Council, as one of the "three sins".

=== Health care ===
Pompeo opposed the Affordable Care Act (ACA). Pompeo has been criticized for saying he supports funding for certain programs, yet opposing them when they are a part of the ACA. He accused the World Health Organization of being under control of the People's Republic of China. The WHO responded by saying Pompeo's comments were unacceptable and a distraction from dealing with the coronavirus pandemic. Dr. Maria Van Kerkhove, an American who was head of the WHO's emerging diseases and zoonosis unit at the time of the pandemic also expressed pride at the WHO for "saving lives". It was argued that the attempt to blame the WHO was a way to draw attention away from the failings of the Trump administration.

=== Social issues ===
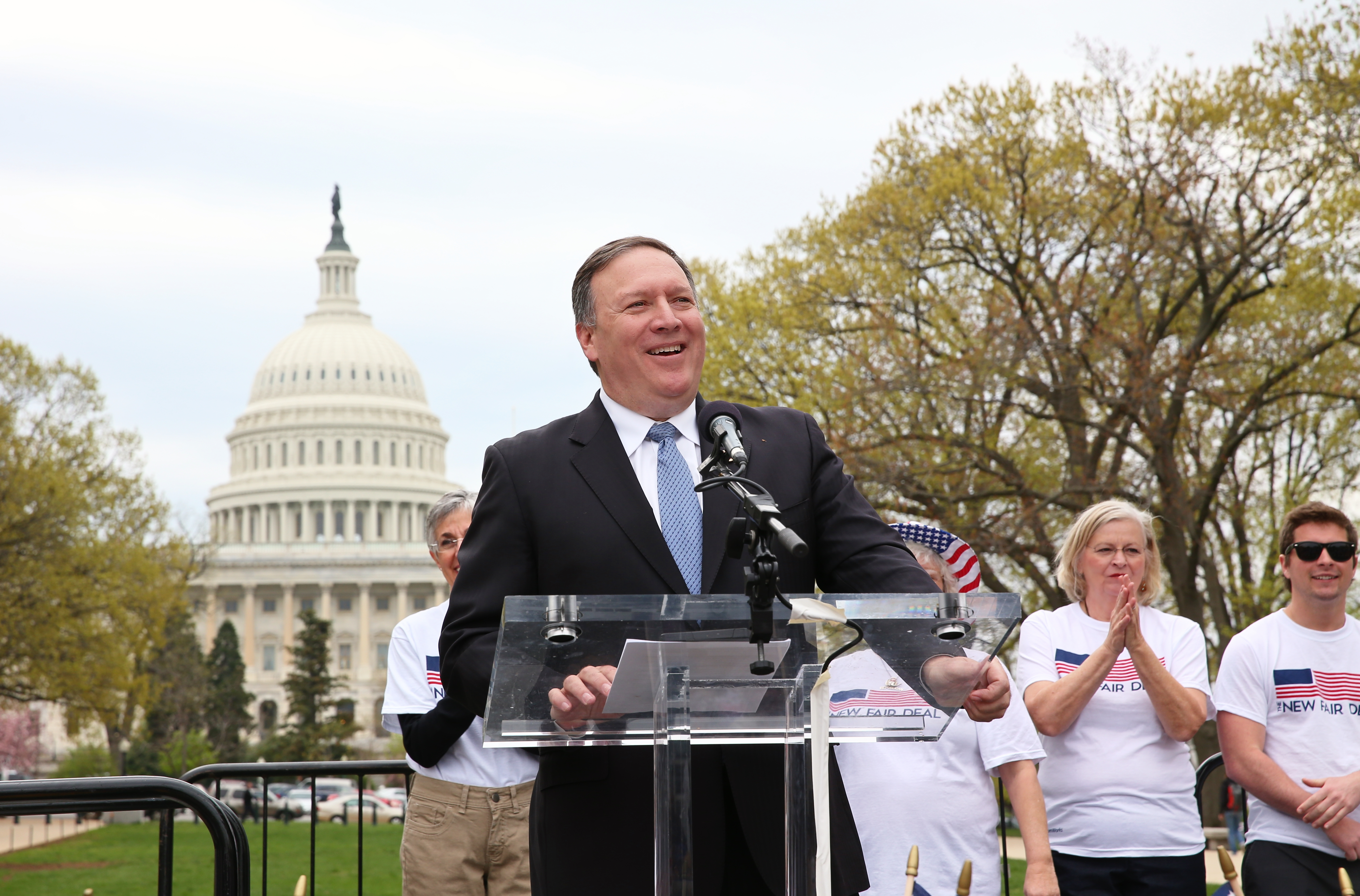
Congressman Pompeo at FreedomWorks New Fair Deal rally outside the U.S. Capitol, April 2013

Pompeo has stated that life begins at conception and believes abortions should be allowed only when necessary to save the life of the mother, with no exceptions for rape. In 2011, he voted for the No Taxpayer Funding for Abortion Act, which would have banned federal health coverage that includes abortion. On May 31, 2011, he voted for H.R.2059 11-HR2059, which eliminated funding for the United Nations Population Fund.

He opposes same-sex marriage and sponsored bills to let states prevent same-sex couples from marrying.

Pompeo was instrumental in the development of the anti-abortion Geneva Consensus Declaration.

=== Economy ===
Pompeo supported the United States federal government shutdown of 2013, blaming President Obama. He said he believed the shutdown was necessary to avoid an "American financial collapse 10 years from now".

=== International Criminal Court ===
Pompeo continued a non-cooperative policy towards the International Criminal Court in The Hague, enacting sanctions against the ICC's chief prosecutor and other officials in September 2020. Some security experts have suggested Pompeo himself could potentially face charges under the ICC statutes for CIA activities in Afghanistan during his time as director of that agency.

== Personal life ==
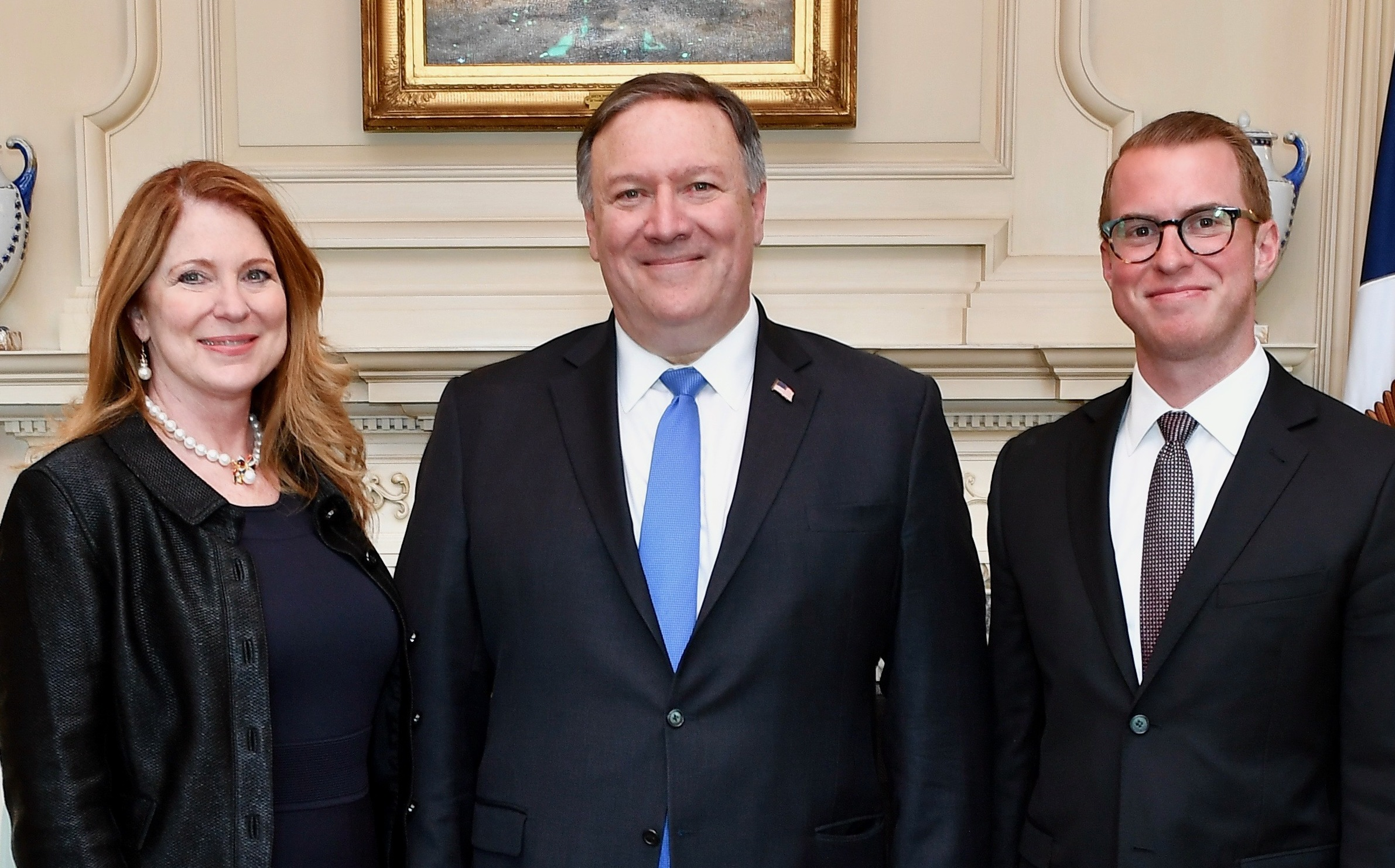
Mike Pompeo (center) with wife Susan and son Nicholas in 2018

Pompeo married Leslie Libert in 1986. The couple later divorced. He then married Susan Justice Mostrous in 2000 and formally adopted her son, Nicholas.

Pompeo is affiliated with the Evangelical Presbyterian Church. Pompeo served as a local church deacon from 2007 to 2009 and taught Sunday school.

In 2014, Pompeo told a church group that Christians needed to "know that Jesus Christ as our savior is truly the only solution for our world". In 2015 in a talk at a church, Pompeo said that "politics is a never-ending struggle ... until the Rapture."

In an interview with Fox News in January 2022, Pompeo said he has lost over 90 lb (41 kg) in the prior six months through self-guided exercises and dietary changes. Experts were skeptical of Pompeo's claim that such changes could have produced this weight loss in a man his age, and The Guardian said that Pompeo's history of misleading statements cast further doubt on his claims.

== Foreign honors ==
- (Taiwan) Order of Brilliant Star with Special Grand Cordon (2021)
- (Albania) Doctor Honoris Causa, University of Tirana (2022)

== See also ==
- Foreign interference in the 2020 United States elections
- List of members of the American Legion
- List of people who have held multiple United States Cabinet-level positions
- Timeline of investigations into Trump and Russia (2019)

U.S. House of Representatives
| Preceded by Todd Tiahrt | Member of the U.S. House of Representatives from Kansas's 4th congressional district 2011–2017 | Succeeded by Ron Estes |
Government offices
| Preceded by John O. Brennan | Director of the Central Intelligence Agency; 2017–2018 | Succeeded by Gina Haspel |
Political offices
| Preceded by Rex Tillerson | United States Secretary of State; 2018–2021 | Succeeded by Antony Blinken |
U.S. order of precedence (ceremonial)
| Preceded by Rex Tillerson as Former U.S. Secretary of State | Order of precedence of the United States as Former U.S. Secretary of State | Succeeded by Antony Blinken as Former U.S. Secretary of State |
