= Allen, Allen, Allen & Allen =

American law firm

- Headquarters: Richmond, Virginia
- No. of offices: 8
- No. of attorneys: 41
- No. of employees: 200
- Major practice areas: Personal injury; Medical malpractice
- Date founded: 1910
- Founder: George E. Allen, Sr.
- Website: allenandallen.com

Allen, Allen, Allen & Allen is a United States law firm in Richmond, Virginia. It was founded in Lunenburg County, Virginia, by George E. Allen Sr. The firm has seven offices in Virginia, in Richmond, Charlottesville, Chesterfield, Fredericksburg, Mechanicsville, Petersburg, and Stafford.

The name of the law firm has sometimes drawn the attention of the press for the four occurrences of the same last name.

== History ==
Allen, Allen, Allen & Allen was founded by George E. Allen Sr. and his three sons George E. Jr., Ashby B., and Wilbur C.

In 1951 Allen & Allen represented the plaintiffs in Mahone v. Ford Motor Company.

In February 2009, Coleman Allen, Jr., a trial lawyer with the firm, was co-signer with Rodney A. Smolla for Vicki Iseman of the public statement released upon Ms. Iseman's settlement (without cash) of her defamation suit against The New York Times. Ms. Iseman had sued over coverage of her part in the John McCain lobbyist controversy, during Sen. McCain's 2008 presidential campaign. The statement rested much of the case on whether Ms. Iseman was a private citizen or public figure in the situation, with her lawyers arguing for her rights as a private citizen.

In 2013, Matthew Murray, an attorney with the Allen, Allen, Allen & Allen firm was disciplined by the Virginia State Bar for obstructionist conduct in Lester v. Allied Concrete. Murray accepted a five year suspension from the Virginia State Bar and resigned his position from the Allen, Allen, Allen & Allen law firm.

== Presidents ==
- 1957-1990: Wilbur C. Allen
- -2024: Edward L. Allen
- Since 2024: Jason W. Konvicka
