= John McCain lobbyist controversy =

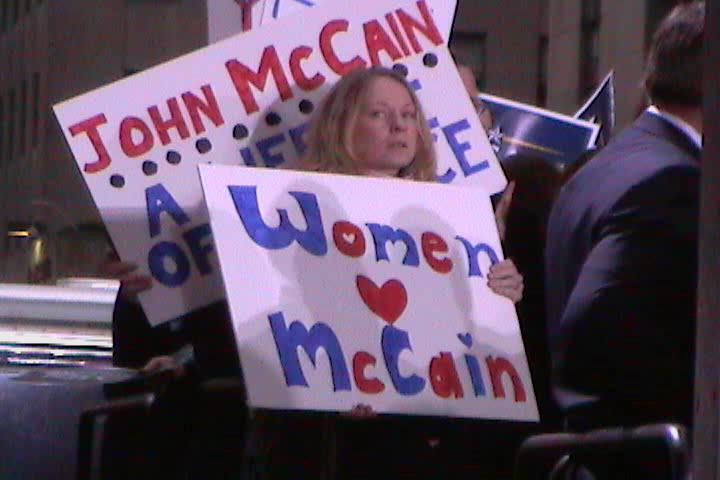
Vicki Iseman attending a February 5, 2008 rally for McCain's 2008 presidential campaign

On February 21, 2008, in the midst of John McCain's campaign in the 2008 Republican Party presidential primaries, both The New York Times and the Washington Post published articles detailing rumors of an improper relationship between John McCain and lobbyist Vicki Iseman.

According to The New York Times story, McCain, who was a member of the Senate Commerce Committee during the period when Iseman was lobbying the committee, developed a close personal relationship with Iseman. The New York Times came under intense criticism for the article because of its use of anonymous sources and its timing.

In December 2008, Iseman filed a US$27 million defamation lawsuit against The New York Times, alleging that the paper falsely communicated an illicit romantic relationship between her and McCain. The Times said they "fully stood behind the article" and the story was "true and accurate". The lawsuit was settled in February 2009 with no money changing hands between the parties. However, as a condition of the settlement The New York Times printed an unusual "Note to Readers" stating that The Times had not intended to allege any affair.

== McCain and the FCC ==
McCain wrote letters in 1998 and 1999 to the Federal Communications Commission encouraging it to uphold marketing agreements allowing a television company to control two stations in the same city, a position which Iseman had been advocating on behalf of her client Glencairn Ltd. (now Cunningham Broadcasting). McCain also introduced a bill to create tax incentives for minority ownership of stations, which several businesses Iseman represented were seeking.

In February 1999, McCain and Iseman attended a small fund-raising dinner with several clients at a Miami- area home of a cruise line executive, then flew back to Washington along with a campaign aide on the corporate jet of Paxson Communications (now ION Media Networks), one of her clients. Later in 1999, Iseman requested McCain to write to the FCC urging it to reach a speedy decision in a case involving Paxson Communications. Iseman, according to an email sent to The Times, provided McCain's staff with the information to write the letter. McCain's two letters to the FCC resulted in William Kennard, the FCC chairman, issuing a rare public rebuke to McCain for his interference in FCC deliberations.

McCain also frequently denied requests from Iseman and the companies she represented, including attempts in 2006 to break up cable packages, something opposed by companies she represented. His proposals for satellite distribution of local television stations also failed to match the desires of Iseman's clients.

Iseman said she never received special treatment from McCain's office, and McCain said he never demonstrated favoritism to Iseman or her clients. During a phone call to Bill Keller, executive editor of The New York Times, he said, "I have never betrayed the public trust by doing anything like that."

Iseman's clients contributed tens of thousands of dollars to McCain's campaigns.

== Alleged concerns about alleged romantic relationship with McCain ==
According to The Times story, Iseman began visiting McCain's offices and campaign events so frequently in 2000 that his aides were "convinced the relationship had become romantic". One staff member supposedly asked, "Why is she always around?"

According to The Times narrative, staff aides also worried that McCain's relationship with Iseman would receive negative media attention due to the letters McCain wrote to government regulators on her behalf, especially since McCain's campaign stressed his probity and included proposals for more stringent regulation of lobbying in the United States. The Times story never explicitly alleged that an affair took place. Daniel Schnur, McCain's 2000 communication director with no current connection to the campaign, called The Times account "highly implausible".

== McCain's aides allegedly intervene to "save McCain from himself" ==
The New York Times and Washington Post reported that unnamed staff members began a campaign to "save McCain from himself" by restricting Iseman's access to McCain during the course of the 2000 presidential primary. According to the Washington Post story published the same day as The New York Times story, Weaver met with Iseman at Union Station (Washington, D.C.) to tell Iseman not to see McCain anymore. Weaver, who arranged the meeting after a discussion among campaign leaders, said Iseman and he discussed "her conduct and what she allegedly had told people, which made its way back to us." Weaver heard that she was saying "she had strong ties to the Commerce Committee and his staff" and told her this was wrong and for it to stop. No discussion of a romantic involvement occurred because, according to Weaver, "there was no reason to". Iseman confirmed she met with Weaver, but disputed his account of the conversation.

Supposedly, an unnamed campaign adviser was instructed to keep Iseman away from McCain at public events, and plans were made to limit her access to his offices. It was reported that campaign associates confronted McCain directly about the risks he was taking with campaign and career. McCain allegedly admitted he was behaving inappropriately and promised to distance himself from Iseman. Concerns about the relationship eventually receded as the campaign continued.

== Response from McCain's campaign ==
On February 20, the night before the article appeared in the printed newspaper, but just after the story was available online, the McCain presidential campaign issued the following statement: "It is a shame that The New York Times has lowered its standards to engage in a hit-and-run smear campaign. John McCain had a 24-year record of serving our country with honor and integrity. He has never violated the public trust, never done favors for special interests or lobbyists, and he will not allow a smear campaign to distract from the issues at stake in this election. Americans are sick and tired of this kind of gutter politics, and there is nothing in this story to suggest that John McCain has ever violated the principles that have guided his career." A McCain campaign adviser added that the report "reads like a tabloid gossip sheet".

Robert S. Bennett, whom McCain had hired to represent him in this matter, defended McCain's character. Bennett, a registered Democrat, was the special investigator during the Keating Five scandal that The Times revisited in the article. Bennett, who was coincidentally on Fox News' Hannity and Colmes program to promote his autobiography shortly after the paper published the story on their website, said that he fully investigated McCain back then and suggested to the Senate Ethics Committee to not pursue charges against McCain.

And if there is one thing I am absolutely confident of, it is John McCain is an honest and honest man. I recommended to the Senate Ethics Committee that he be cut out of the case, that there was no evidence against him, and I think for the New York Times to dig this up just shows that Senator McCain's public statement about this is correct. It's a smear job. I'm sorry.

McCain spoke in a press conference the following day saying, "I'm very disappointed in the article. It's not true." He stated he never showed favoritism for her clients: "At no time have I ever done anything that would betray the public trust." He went on to characterize Iseman as a friend but no closer than other lobbyists. Both he and his wife strenuously denied any impropriety. He said he wasn't aware of the meeting Weaver had with Iseman nor of any concerns among his staff about his association.

== Ethics of publication questioned ==
The Times' decision to publish the article while relying almost entirely on anonymous sources has raised ethical questions relating to the story's veracity and importance.

George Stephanopoulos, an ABC News correspondent, said that — while damaging — as long as the sources remain anonymous this story will not throw the campaign off course. He quoted McCain aides that they will go after The New York Times "with extreme aggression — if the newspaper was going to act like a partisan they were going to treat them as a partisan." On the same day, fellow Senator Joe Lieberman, who endorsed McCain for the presidency, said, "The story I think is outrageously unfair to him. There's no 'there' there." U.S. News & World Report publisher Mort Zuckerman said, "I don't think that there is enough acknowledged sourcing for this story." Commentator Bill O'Reilly raised the question about why the paper had endorsed McCain on January 25, 2008, for the Republican nomination if they had information that alleged an inappropriate relationship.

Academics and legal journals offered both support and criticism of the story. The editor of the American Journalism Review said that, while the article wasn't entirely convincing, it did put to question McCain's reputation as a reformer. The editor of the Columbia Journalism Review said the circumstances outlined in the story were sufficient to justify its publication. However, a dean at the Columbia Graduate School of Journalism disagreed, saying, "[If] you haven't covered all your bases or been transparent about where you got the information ... then the criticism takes over and the story loses its significance." Kathleen Hall Jamieson, director of the Annenberg Public Policy Center faulted the paper for focusing on the purported affair.

Several conservative voices, who had recently criticized McCain, came to his defense. Brent Bozell of the watchdog Media Research Center (widely viewed as conservative) speculated that the story was done hastily because it feared the embarrassment of an imminent New Republic article reporting on internal dissension about the story. Talk show host Rush Limbaugh said, "This is what you get when you walk across the aisle and try to make these people your friends. I'm not surprised in the least that the NYT would try to take out John McCain." Jay Ambrose, an opinion columnist for the Boston Herald, summarized their sentiment by writing, "One of the first rules of decent, principles-abiding journalism is that you don't print rumors. That is nevertheless what The New York Times [NYT] just did in a smear job on John McCain. ... " San Francisco Chronicle columnist Debra Saunders wrote, "The paper set out to shine a spotlight on McCain's ethics, but it ended up turning a harsh light on its own ethical lapses."

Some liberal commentators and critics of the Republican Party have also questioned the purpose of the story. Jonathan Alter of Newsweek said the article lacked physical evidence, noting, "[L]et's face it, people are more interested in sex than they are in telecommunications lobbying activity." John Dean argued that, if false, the article is both unfair and damaging, suggesting that legal recourse was possible. Journalist Hanna Rosin, writing in Slate, said the Times rushed the story to publication and left key questions unanswered, writing "Either write the cheating story or don't. As it is, it just looks like a lame story where they quote a bunch of anonymous old campaign sources but don't have any actual evidence of the affair themselves. And they make it much easier for McCain to just stomp on the story." Also writing for Slate, Michael Kinsley criticized the Times for "semantic acrobatics" in "defending itself with a preposterous assertion that it wasn't trying to imply what it obviously was trying to imply".

In defense of the article, reporters for Politico wondered that if the story was about McCain's possible 2008 presidential opponent, Senator Barack Obama, whether conservatives may have been more curious about the details of the story which they felt had substance, a sentiment echoed by The New Republic. Times editor Bill Keller defended the story, saying the facts were well vetted and the timing was a result of waiting until the story was ready. Other Times editors defended the use of anonymous sources, saying they knew their identities and that they provided thorough and consistent stories. However, Clark Hoyt, the ombudsman for The New York Times, criticized the article for its lack of details and independent proof.

== Follow-up article ==
On February 23, The New York Times followed up their original article with an article on McCain's efforts to help a client of Iseman's before the FCC. According to the article, "In late 1998, Senator John McCain sent an unusually blunt letter to the head of the Federal Communications Commission, warning that he would try to overhaul the agency if it closed a broadcast ownership loophole."

Former staffer to President Bill Clinton and current Hillary Clinton supporter Lanny Davis said the article "had no merit". Stating that he did not support McCain's bid for the White House, Davis, who had himself lobbied for the same cause Iseman lobbied McCain for, said that McCain only wrote a letter to the FCC to ask them to "act soon" and refused to write a letter that supported the sale of the television station the article talked about.

== Defamation lawsuit and settlement ==
In December 2008, Iseman filed a US$27 million defamation lawsuit against The New York Times, alleging that the paper falsely communicated an illicit romantic relationship between her and McCain. The Times said they "fully stood behind the article" and the story was "true and accurate".

In February, 2009, the lawsuit was settled with no money changing hands between the parties. From The Times coverage of the settlement: "On Thursday, the two sides released a joint statement saying: 'To resolve the lawsuit, Ms. Iseman has accepted The Times's explanation, which will appear in a Note to Readers to be published in the newspaper on Feb. 20, that the article did not state, and The Times did not intend to conclude, that Ms. Iseman had engaged in a romantic affair with Senator McCain or an unethical relationship on behalf of her clients in breach of the public trust.' That statement was published on The Times's Web site, as was a statement from Ms. Iseman's lawyers. They wrote, in part: 'Had this case proceeded to trial, the judicial determination of whether she is entitled to the protections afforded a private citizen would have been the subject of a ferocious, pivotal battle, with Ms. Iseman insisting on her status as a private person and The New York Times asserting that she had entered the public arena, and was therefore fair game.'" Ms. Iseman's lawyers for the published the statement were Rodney A. Smolla is an attorney, and Dean of the Washington and Lee University School of Law. W. Coleman Allen Jr. is a trial lawyer with Allen, Allen, Allen & Allen, based in Richmond, Virginia.

Iseman spoke out personally against The New York Times story for the first time during a March 2, 2009, interview on The Early Show, where she vehemently denied having an affair with McCain, and said of the story, "Any assertions that there was anything inappropriate, ethically or professionally or personally are just not true." Iseman criticized the way the story was handled, and felt the newspaper became so invested in proving it was true that it became "out of control." She also said the entire story appeared to be based on a single source, who she claimed was John Weaver, a McCain political consultant she believed was offended when Iseman criticized a speech Weaver may have written. She said of Weaver's influence on the story, "[it] all went back to one singular person, a political operative who had left the senator's campaign under acrimonious circumstances. ... All roads lead back to him." Weaver, who was quoted in the original Times story saying he met with Iseman after concerns were raised about her presence in the campaign, previously said he did not speak to the paper without permission from the McCain campaign.
