= John McCain 2008 presidential campaign =

John McCain for President 2008
- Campaign: 2008 Republican primaries; 2008 U.S. presidential election
- Candidate: John McCain; U.S. Senator from Arizona; (1987–2018); Sarah Palin; 9th Governor of Alaska; (2006–2009)
- Affiliation: Republican Party
- Status: Announced: February 28, 2007; Presumptive nominee: March 4, 2008; Official nominee: September 3, 2008; Lost election: November 4, 2008
- Headquarters: Arlington, Virginia
- Key people: Steve Schmidt (operations chief); Rick Davis (campaign manager); Robert Mosbacher (general chairman); Tom Loeffler (co-chair); Tim Pawlenty (co-chair); Jill Hazelbaker (spokeswoman)
- Receipts: US$370 million (December 31, 2007)
- Slogan(s): Country First; The Original Maverick; Best Prepared to Lead from Day One; Courageous Service, Experienced Leadership, Bold Solutions. A leader we can believe in Reform • Prosperity • Peace
- Theme song: "My Hero" by Foo Fighters
- Chant: 'Maverick; Drill, Baby, Drill!'

Website
- JohnMcCain.com (archived – November 4, 2008)

The 2008 presidential campaign of John McCain, the longtime senior U.S. senator from Arizona, was launched with an informal announcement on February 28, 2007, during a live taping of the Late Show with David Letterman, and formally launched at an event on April 25, 2007. His second candidacy for the Presidency of the United States, he had previously run for his party's nomination in the 2000 primaries and was considered as a potential running mate for his party's nominee, then-Governor George W. Bush of Texas. After winning a majority of delegates in the Republican primaries of 2008, on August 29, leading up to the convention, McCain selected Governor Sarah Palin of Alaska as his running mate for Vice President. Five days later, at the 2008 Republican National Convention, McCain was formally selected as the Republican Party presidential nominee in the 2008 presidential election.

McCain began the campaign as the apparent frontrunner among Republicans, with a strategy of appearing as the establishment, inevitable candidate; his campaign website featured an Associated Press article describing him as "[a] political celebrity". He made substantial overtures towards elements of the Republican base that had resisted his 2000 insurgency campaign. However, he soon fell behind in polls and fundraising; by July 2007 his campaign was forced to restructure its size and operations. The tide of Republican sentiment against immigration reform legislation he sponsored also led to the erosion of his lead.

Towards the end of 2007, McCain began a resurgence, which was capped by his January 2008 wins in the New Hampshire, South Carolina, and Florida primaries. This made him the front-runner for the Republican nomination. On Super Tuesday, McCain won both the majority of states and delegates in the Republican primaries, giving him a commanding lead toward the Republican nomination. McCain clinched a majority of the delegates and became the presumptive Republican nominee with wins in several more primaries on March 4. The following day, President George W. Bush endorsed McCain at the White House.

In the general election, facing Democratic nominee, Senator Barack Obama of Illinois, McCain was trailing during most of the season, only gaining a lead in national polls for a period after the Palin announcement and the 2008 Republican National Convention. The dominant issue of the campaign became the 2008 financial crisis. Unable to gain traction against Obama in presidential debates, the final stages of the campaign saw McCain criticizing Obama for being a "redistributionist" and adopting symbols such as Joe the Plumber.

On November 4, 2008, McCain lost to Barack Obama in the general election, receiving 173 votes of the electoral college to Obama's 365 and gaining forty-six percent of the popular vote to Obama's fifty-three percent. Had McCain been elected, he would have been the first president not born in a U.S. state, as he was born in the Panama Canal Zone (which was a U.S. territory at the time of McCain's birth). McCain would have also been the first president from the state of Arizona, and he would have become the oldest elected president. This would have surpassed Ronald Reagan's age of sixty-nine, whereas Palin would have been the first female vice president, as well as the first vice president from Alaska and outside the mainland United States, and Todd Palin would have also become the first second gentleman of the United States. Notably he also would have been the second alumni of the United States Naval Academy since Jimmy Carter to serve as president. These feats would eventually be accomplished twelve years later by Joe Biden—seventy-eight at the time of his election—and Kamala Harris and her husband, Doug Emhoff, who would become the first female vice president and second gentleman, respectively.

McCain would win two more terms as a senator from Arizona in 2010 and 2016 until his death in 2018.

== Leading up to the announcement ==
McCain's oft-cited strengths as a potential presidential candidate in 2008 included national name recognition, sponsorship of major lobbying and campaign finance reform initiatives and leadership in exposing the Abramoff scandal.

He was well known for his military service (including years as a tortured POW) and competing in the 2000 presidential campaign, in which he won the New Hampshire primary before eventually losing the nomination to George W. Bush. McCain also impressed many Republicans with his strong support for President Bush's re-election campaign in 2004, and his role in the confirmation of many of Bush's judicial nominees. He also served as chairman of the International Republican Institute, a U.S. government-funded organization involved in supporting political democracy around the world.

A Time magazine poll dated January 2007 showed McCain deadlocked with possible Democratic opponent Senator Hillary Clinton at 46%; in the same poll McCain trailed Democratic senator Barack Obama 41% to 48%. An earlier Time poll indicated that more Americans were familiar with McCain than any of the other frontrunners, including Obama and Republican candidate and former mayor of New York Rudy Giuliani. During the 2006 election cycle, McCain attended 346 events and raised more than $10.5 million on behalf of Republican candidates. He also donated nearly $1.5 million to federal, state and county parties.

In May 2006, McCain gave the commencement address at Jerry Falwell's Liberty University. During his 2000 presidential bid, McCain had called Falwell an "agent of intolerance". With significant coverage during the campaign, McCain said that he would never back down from his earlier statement. His later appearance at Liberty University prompted questions about the McCain–Falwell relationship and a possible presidential run in 2008. McCain backtracked and stated that Falwell was no longer as divisive and the two had discussed their shared values. McCain delivered a similar address at The New School commencement in Madison Square Garden. McCain was booed, and several students and professors turned their backs or waved fliers reading "McCain does not speak for me." McCain's speech mentioned his unwavering support for the Iraq War and focused on hearing opposing viewpoints, listening to each other, and the relevance of opposition in a democracy.

== Announcement ==
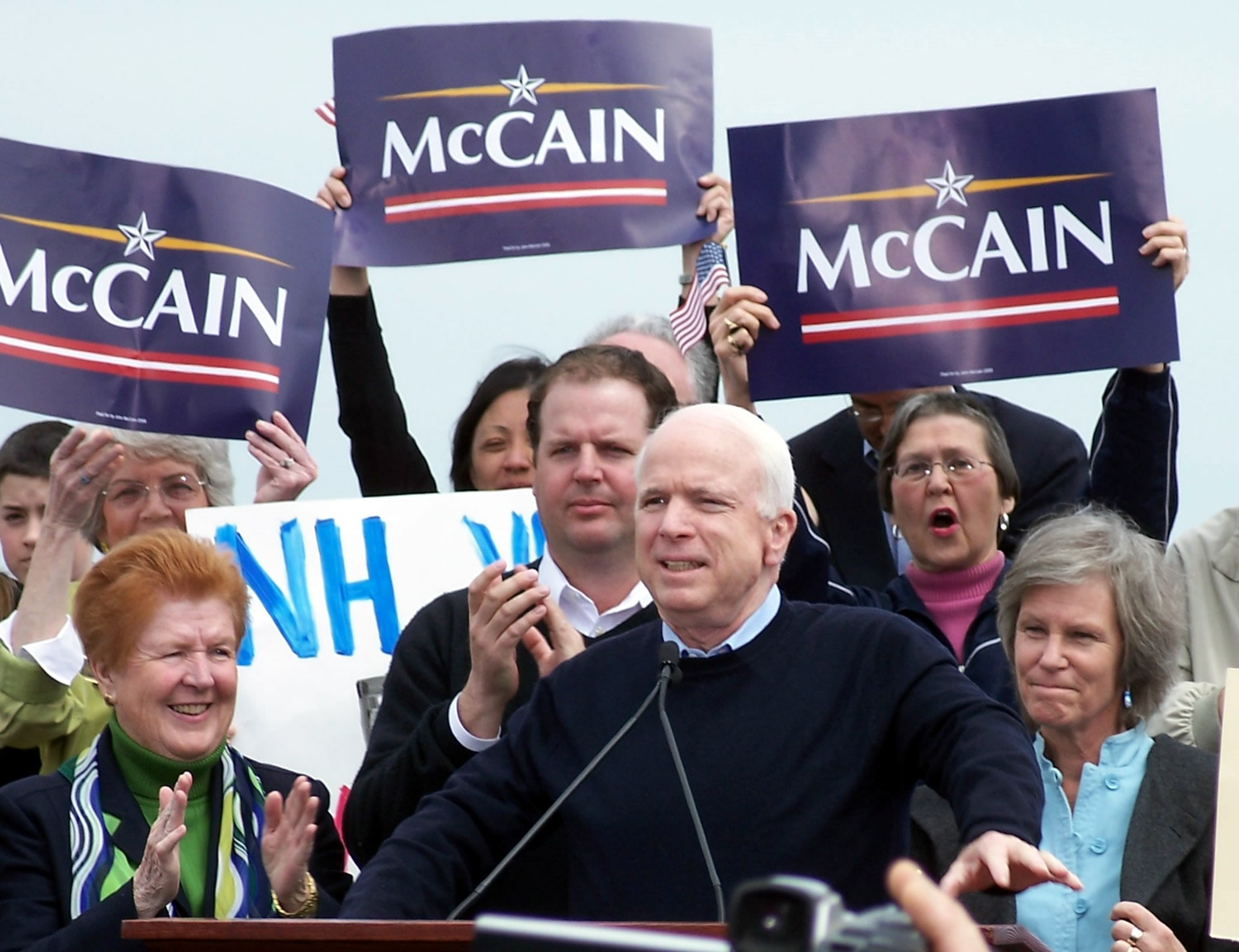
John McCain officially announcing his 2008 run for President in Portsmouth, New Hampshire, April 25, 2007.

McCain informally announced his candidacy on the Wednesday, February 28, 2007, telecast of the Late Show with David Letterman.

He officially announced his candidacy for the presidency of the United States and in turn, his intention to seek the nomination of the Republican Party for the 2008 presidential election, shortly after noon in Prescott Park on the waterfront of Portsmouth, New Hampshire, on Wednesday, April 25, 2007. In his announcement, McCain emphasized that "America should never undertake a war unless we are prepared to do everything necessary to succeed," and he also stated that, "I'm not running for president to be somebody, but to do something; to do the hard but necessary things not the easy and needless things." The audience was somewhat listless. He then visited Saint Anselm College and several other spots around Manchester, New Hampshire, on a cold rainy day, before starting a planned three-day campaign rally in South Carolina, Iowa, Nevada, and Arizona.

== Campaign staff and policy team ==
On July 2, 2008, Steve Schmidt was given "full operational control" of McCain's campaign. Schmidt had managed Arnold Schwarzenegger's 2006 re-election and was a top Dick Cheney aide. Rick Davis had the title of McCain's campaign manager throughout 2008, but his role was reduced when Schmidt was given control.

Davis was previously the campaign's chief executive, and had become campaign manager when John Weaver, McCain's chief aide, and Terry Nelson, his previous campaign manager, resigned on July 11, 2007. Davis was also campaign manager during McCain's 2000 presidential campaign, when Weaver had been McCain's chief campaign strategist. In 2005 and 2006, U.S. intelligence warned McCain's Senate staff about the Senator's involvement with Davis, who was then a lobbyist in business with Paul Manafort, but U.S. intelligence gave no further warnings about Davis's Russian connections when Davis was McCain's national campaign manager from July 2007 to November 2008.

Other top staffers included McCain's former chief of staff Mark Salter and long-time political strategist Charlie Black who worked for Reagan, both Bushes and South Carolina Senator Lindsey Graham. Former Bush advisor Mark McKinnon also worked for the campaign before leaving in May 2008 to avoid working against Barack Obama. Jill Hazelbaker was the campaign's chief spokeswoman. McCain's press secretary was Melissa Shuffield.

Neoconservative pundit Bill Kristol served as a foreign policy advisor. Randy Scheunemann, a board member of the Project for the New American Century, was hired in January 2007 as McCain's foreign-policy aide. He was the top advisor for security and international issues. Douglas Holtz-Eakin was a senior policy adviser, Nicolas Muzin was medical advisor and Nicolle Wallace was senior adviser on message.

== Campaign developments 2007 ==
=== Initial stages ===
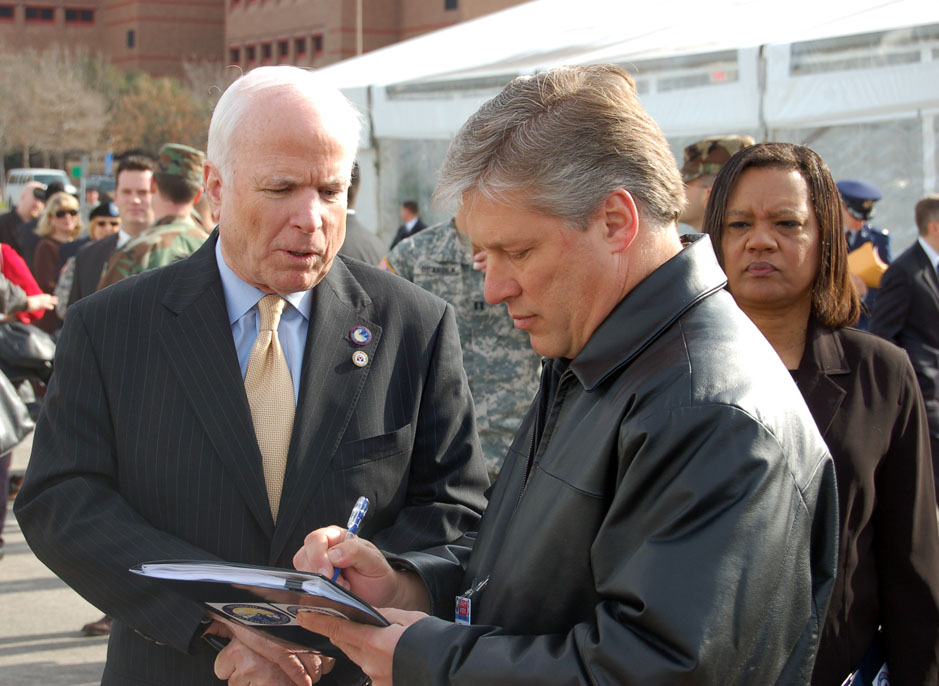
Senator John McCain interviewed at Fort Sam Houston, Texas, prior to the ribbon cutting ceremony of The Center for the Intrepid, a $50 million physical rehabilitation facility designed for servicemembers wounded in Operations Iraqi Freedom and Enduring Freedom. January 29, 2007.

By a few weeks prior to making his announcement on Letterman, McCain was already beginning to trail behind former Mayor of New York City Rudy Giuliani in the polls, a situation attributed to his steadfast support for the Iraq War troop surge of 2007.

In March 2007, with considerable press attention and in hopes of reigniting his efforts, McCain brought back the "Straight Talk Express" campaign bus that he had used to much positive effect in his outsider run in 2000. Like many candidates, McCain took to the internet in order to help boost his campaign; appealing to younger audiences by creating Facebook and MySpace pages, along with an account on YouTube.

=== Claims about Iraq safety ===
McCain supported the Iraq War troop surge of 2007 proposed by President George W. Bush. On March 28, 2007, McCain said that, "General Petraeus goes out [in Baghdad] almost every day in an unarmed humvee". On March 29, CNN's John Roberts reported, "I checked with General Petraeus's people overnight and they said he never goes out in anything less than an up-armored humvee." On the same day, McCain also said that, "There are neighborhoods in Baghdad where you and I could walk through those neighborhoods, today... The US is beginning to succeed in Iraq." On the same day, retired U.S. Army General Barry McCaffrey issued a report saying, "... no Iraqi government official, coalition soldier, diplomat, reporter could walk the streets of Baghdad without heavily armed protection".

On April 1, 2007, McCain and other lawmakers visited a Baghdad market and claimed that "things are better and there are encouraging signs". The visit was accompanied by enormous security measures, as McCain himself wore a bullet-proof vest, and was surrounded by more than 100 troops and escorted by attack helicopters. The day after McCain's visit, 21 workers and children from the market were killed in a suicide bombing.

=== Missed votes in Senate ===
In May 2007, it was reported that McCain had missed 42 consecutive votes (five straight weeks) in the Senate while he was conducting his presidential campaign. From March to May, McCain only attended three-floor votes in the Senate, though none of McCain's missed votes altered a bill's fate. According to The Washington Post statistics, McCain missed more votes than any senator including Tim Johnson, who missed many votes after suffering a brain hemorrhage in December 2006. As of August 2008, McCain had missed 63.8% of votes in the 110th Congress during his campaign. Because of their majority status, Senate Democrats could sometimes delay votes in order to accommodate the schedules of Democratic presidential candidates.

=== Immigration bill ===
As early as 2005, McCain conducted bipartisan efforts with fellow Senator Ted Kennedy to create a bill—the Secure America and Orderly Immigration Act—that would have changed America's immigration policy and provide a path to citizenship for illegal immigrants already in the country. Later McCain championed the Comprehensive Immigration Reform Act of 2007.

=== Iowa straw poll ===
In June 2007, McCain drew some criticism for dropping out of the August Iowa Straw Poll. Some Republican officials felt the move could be seen as "dissing Iowa". In response, a man in a chicken suit, known as the Iowa Chicken, began demonstrating at McCain's appearances in Iowa and carrying a sign reading "you balked at the straw poll." Despite this, McCain maintained that he was still planning on competing in the Iowa Caucus. Some political observers have opined that the Straw Poll results are bought by campaigns.

However, polls taken in June showed that McCain's Iowa support had dropped to the single digits, from the mid-20s to 6%.

=== Campaign downsizing and restructuring ===
McCain's second quarter 2007 fundraising results and campaign financials were poor. Both McCain supporters and political observers pointed to McCain's support for the Comprehensive Immigration Reform Act of 2007, very unpopular among the Republican base electorate, as a primary cause of his fundraising problems.

Large-scale campaign staff downsizing took place in early July, with 50 to 100 staffers let go and others taking pay cuts or switching to no pay. McCain's aides said the campaign was considering taking public matching funds, and would focus its efforts on the early primary and caucus states. McCain however said he was not considering dropping out of the race.

Fellow Senator, but Immigration Reform Act opponent, Tom Coburn, wrote a piece for National Review praising McCain for showing great political courage in sticking behind the Act even though it was damaging his presidential hopes.

Campaign shakeups reached the top level on July 10, 2007, when campaign manager Terry Nelson and campaign chief strategist John Weaver both departed. Another senior aide and co-author of McCain's books, Mark Salter, reduced his role in the campaign as well (he would later return to a full role). McCain's co-chair for his Florida campaign, State Rep Bob Allen, was arrested on July 11, 2007, on charges of sexual solicitation (prostitution). In addition, on July 16, 2007, nine members of McCain's staff, including Brian Jones, McCain's communications director, and two deputies, Matt David and Danny Diaz, announced their resignations.

=== "Living off the Land" ===
Following the upheaval, the new McCain campaign put out a plan for how to continue on. Entitled "Living Off the Land: A Plan for Financial Viability", it called for expenses to be greatly cut and for McCain to take advantage of free media such as debates and sponsored events. McCain would focus on the early caucus and primary states, instead of trying to run a nationally-scoped effort, would try to "win debates and outperform other candidates", and thereby regain momentum and recapture the faith of potential donors.

McCain's strategy was hampered by several other events within the Republican field dominating the political discussion in the ensuing months: Fred Thompson's entry into the race in early September; the focus in debates over battles between Rudy Giuliani and Mitt Romney; and the discussion over the impact of Romney's religion. Mike Huckabee's sudden surge from the second tier into near-frontrunner status dominated much of the news in November and December 2007. Nevertheless, McCain persevered, riding his "Straight Talk Express" bus through New Hampshire and, as in the past, granting reporters and bloggers far more direct access than would other campaigns.

=== December 2007: Comeback ===
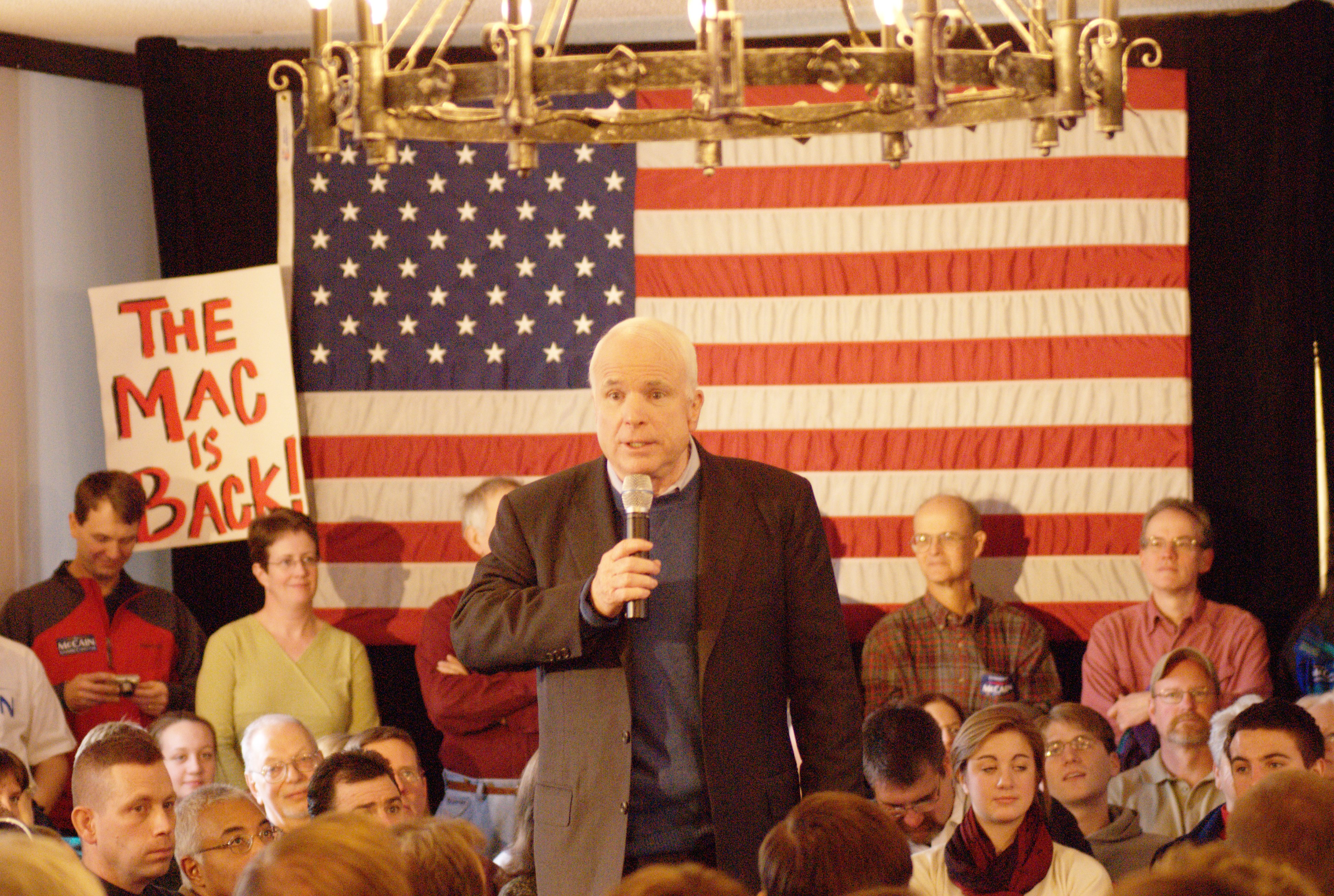
John McCain campaigning in Merrimack, New Hampshire, on December 29, 2007. "Mac is back!" became a familiar chant in his appearances once his campaign fortunes improved.

In the final months before the caucuses and primaries began, McCain had still not quite reclaimed his previous front-runner status. However, the Republican race was quite unsettled, with none of the top-tier candidates dominating the race and all of them possessing major vulnerabilities. Huckabee's ascendence was damaging to Romney, as they traded shots during the days leading up to the Iowa caucuses. Romney and Huckabee put much of their early efforts into Iowa, making the caucus particularly crucial for each of them. Giuliani's campaign was suffering from conflicts regarding strategy, damaging revelations about his personal life and the federal indictment of longtime ally and friend Bernard Kerik. Thompson's campaign had not gained momentum after his late entry to the race and had been described as "lackluster". Through November, McCain had put little effort into Iowa, instead focusing on New Hampshire, where he had staged a big win in his 2000 campaign. By mid-December McCain had climbed back to second place in some New Hampshire polls, and also hoped to benefit from independents, who are able to vote in the New Hampshire Republican primary. Political observers also saw McCain as the "second choice" of many voters, one who could benefit from the troubles of Romney and Giuliani in particular.

McCain's candidacy in New Hampshire was bolstered by a December 2 endorsement from the often-influential New Hampshire Union Leader. This was followed by an endorsement from The Boston Globe, which is circulated within New Hampshire, on December 15. He was endorsed by the smaller Portsmouth Herald on December 16, and by the Boston Herald on December 20. The Boston Herald endorsement prompted McCain to state in an ad that "Romney's hometown newspaper says the choice is clear: John McCain". These coincided with an unusual national candidate-level, cross-party endorsement of McCain by 2000 Democratic vice presidential nominee Joe Lieberman on December 16; the McCain camp hoped that this would help him appeal to independent voters in New Hampshire. McCain also won the endorsement of the influential Des Moines Register in Iowa, which surprised even McCain because he had not focused many resources on the state, and because of his opposition to federal subsidies for ethanol—a favorite issue of Iowan farmers. By a few days before Christmas, there were multiple press reports of a "McCain surge", with poll numbers improving both in early states—including Iowa—and nationwide. The New Hampshire resurgence was further confirmed by Romney now changing the focus of his criticisms from Giuliani to McCain. By the time the Concord Monitor endorsed him on December 29, over twenty New Hampshire papers, large and small, had given him their nods. Some political analysts cautioned that even if the McCain campaign staged some surprise early showings or victories, it was still short on the money and ground organization necessary to exploit a breakthrough. Conservative columnist Robert Novak, though, predicted on December 27 that if McCain could win New Hampshire, he would be the favorite to "sweep through subsequent primaries despite meager finances and organization". Novak also stated that McCain was seen by Republican insiders as the "best bet" to win the nomination and the candidate most likely to defeat a Democrat in the November general election.

When the close proximity of the first contests to the holidays prompted many candidates to release Christmas videos—allowing them to continue presenting their messages, but in more seasonal settings—McCain chose one which told his Good Samaritan story of a POW camp guard in North Vietnam who undid his torture ropes for a night and then later drew a cross in the dirt for him on Christmas Day.

The December 27 assassination of former Pakistani prime minister Benazir Bhutto drew responses from all of the major candidates. McCain, a longtime member of the Senate Armed Services Committee, called attention to his foreign policy experience, as well as his personal interaction with Pakistani president Pervez Musharraf. He also drew a contrast with his main Republican rivals, who did not have experience in foreign policy matters. Many observers saw McCain as the candidate most likely to benefit from a heightened focus on international events.

== Caucuses and primaries 2008 ==
=== Iowa ===
The first vote of the 2008 election season took place in the Iowa caucuses on January 3, 2008. McCain came in fourth place, with 13.1% of the vote. Mike Huckabee was the winner with 34%. Because McCain, unlike Romney and Huckabee, had not focused on Iowa early, his campaign officials said they were satisfied with his placement. Many political observers considered Huckabee's easy win a blow to Romney, McCain's main rival in New Hampshire. Romney spent about five times as much as Huckabee on advertising in Iowa.

=== New Hampshire ===
The New Hampshire primaries came only five days after Iowa. McCain's rising New Hampshire poll numbers indicated that he could benefit from Romney's poor Iowa showing. McCain participated in a January 5 debate along with Romney, Giuliani, Huckabee, Thompson and Ron Paul. The debate particularly highlighted differences between McCain and Romney, as the two traded shots on the immigration issue. Polls in the days leading up to the vote showed McCain leading Romney in a tight race, and all candidates campaigned in the state in the days following the Iowa vote. McCain held over 100 of his signature town hall-style meetings in the state, in many cases repeating visits that he had made during his successful 2000 primary there. A "pivotal moment" for the campaign came a month before the primary, when the New Hampshire Union Leader endorsed McCain. Despite McCain's resurgence, his campaign was still strapped for funds: top-level staff was working without paychecks, commercials were being prepared at cost, and event mailers were only a quarter of what he was able to send out in his 2000 campaign.

A strong performance in the ABC, Facebook Debates at Saint Anselm College, combined with months of hard work from his dedicated staff resulted in McCain winning the New Hampshire primary, gaining about 37 percent of the vote to Mitt Romney's 32 percent. Amid chants of "Mac is back!", McCain made his victory remarks. "When the pundits declared us finished, I told them, 'I'm going to New Hampshire where the voters don't let you make their decisions for them... I'm going to New Hampshire, and I'm going to tell people the truth.'"

=== Michigan ===
With different winners in Iowa and New Hampshire—and Mitt Romney taking the lower-profile Wyoming caucus—the January 15 Michigan primary loomed as an important battle, despite the state's delegation size being cut in half for holding the primary too early. Polls after New Hampshire showed a tight race between McCain and Romney, with Huckabee a close third. Many saw Michigan as Romney's last chance for a campaign-saving win after disappointments in the first two races. Others said that a win in Michigan could cement McCain's status as the "front-runner" for the nomination. McCain's campaign garnered about $1 million in newly contributed funds immediately after the New Hampshire win, but still had $3.5 million in bank debt. He was not alone in feeling a financial pinch; the entire Republican field suffered from a lack of enthusiasm and lower donations than the Democratic candidates were receiving.

Nevertheless, some polls showed McCain getting a significant national bounce from his New Hampshire win; the January 11 CNN nationwide poll had him leading with 34 percent support, a 21-point increase from where he had been just a month before. As the Michigan race entered its final days, McCain gained some notoriety by sending out mailers there and in South Carolina attacking Romney's tax record and touting his own. A Romney campaign spokesman called the ad "as sloppy as it is factually incorrect", and FactCheck.org called the piece "misleading". McCain responded by saying, "It's not negative campaigning. I think it's what his record is." "It's a tough business," he added.

The dominant issue in Michigan was the state of the economy. Michigan had by far the nation's largest unemployment rate, at 7.4 percent, and was continuing to lose jobs from its historical manufacturing base. McCain offered a bit of his "straight talk" strategy, saying that "There are some jobs that aren't coming back to Michigan," and proposing federal job training plans and other remedies to compensate. Romney seized on McCain's statement as overly pessimistic and promoted instead his family heritage—"[I've] got the automobile industry in my blood veins"—as well as his being a Washington outsider who would go there and "turn Washington inside out".

In the end, McCain finished second in the primary behind Romney, gaining 30 percent of the vote to Romney's 39 percent.

=== South Carolina and Nevada ===
The campaign then moved towards the January 19 South Carolina primary, the state which effectively ended McCain's 2000 campaign for president. Unlike 2000, McCain had the support of much of the state Republican establishment, both in terms of endorsements and campaign staff support. Nevertheless a bit of 2000 surfaced when a group of unknown size called "Vietnam Veterans Against John McCain" set up a website and began sending crude mailers to media members alleging that McCain passed military information to the North Vietnamese during his time as a POW. McCain set up a Truth Squad to combat such attacks and emphasized that he was supported by 75 former POWs. Orson Swindle, who was a POW with McCain, called the flier a "vicious" fraud. "Nothing could be further from the truth," Swindle said. "I know because I was there. The truth is, the North Vietnamese offered John McCain early release, and he refused." After that, however, there was little in the way of dirty tricks during the rest of the campaign.

McCain won the South Carolina primary on January 19, gaining 33% of the vote compared to second-place finisher Mike Huckabee's 30%, winning groups he usually did well with, such as veterans and seniors, and doing well enough with other groups, such as evangelicals. In his victory remarks to supporters that evening, he said, "It took us awhile, but what's eight years among friends?," noting the reversal of fortune from his 2000 defeat there. Indeed, The New York Times described McCain's win as "exorcising the ghosts of the attack-filled primary here that derailed his presidential hopes eight years ago". Pundits credited third-place finisher Fred Thompson with drawing votes from Huckabee in South Carolina, thereby giving a narrow victory to McCain.

There had been a steady barrage of apocalyptic statements and predictions in the days before the South Carolina vote from movement conservative icons: Rush Limbaugh said that if Huckabee or McCain won the nomination, it would "destroy the Republican Party... be the end of it," while Tom DeLay said "McCain has done more to hurt the Republican Party than any elected official I know of." Other talk radio hosts also subjected McCain to criticism for being insufficiently conservative. Prominent conservative radio host Michael Medved said after McCain's win that talk radio was the "big loser" of the primary, adding that the medium has "unmistakably collapsed in terms of impact, influence and credibility because of its hysterical and one-dimensional involvement in the GOP nomination fight".

The Nevada caucus the same day drew less attention from Republican candidates, although the state had 31 delegates at stake compared to South Carolina's 24. McCain did not seriously compete in Nevada, and finished third with 13% of the vote, finishing behind both Romney and Ron Paul.

=== Florida ===
The race then moved to the January 29 Florida primary. This would be a test for McCain among core Republican voters, as unlike New Hampshire and South Carolina, independents and Democrats would not be able to vote in the Republican primary. McCain, Giuliani and Romney were closely matched in pre-election polls, and the contest was seen as important to each campaign, as it was the last primary before Super Tuesday, when 41% of the total delegates were up for grabs. It was also the first time that Rudy Giuliani would seriously compete for delegates since a partial effort in New Hampshire, and the first primary after Fred Thompson withdrew his candidacy.

A January 24 debate at Florida Atlantic University was sedate, with none of the candidates attacking each other and economics the predominant theme. By the next day, however, McCain and Romney were going at each other, with McCain accusing Romney of having once advocated timetables for withdrawal from Iraq, and Romney saying that was untrue—an assessment shared by news organizations, which labeled McCain's charge as misleading—and demanding an apology. Certain statements dogged McCain. NBC News's Tim Russert during a debate raised a McCain quote in which McCain said, "I know a lot less about economics than I do about military and foreign policy issues. I still need to be educated."

Romney seized on these and declared that he, not McCain, was the right choice to lead the country during times of economic uncertainty. On the day before the vote, McCain slammed Romney for flip-flopping, while Romney released a "top ten list" of times McCain had attacked fellow Republicans. Both candidates used the ultimate Republican insult, calling each other a liberal. Overall, McCain was outspent by Romney on Florida television ads by a 3-to-1 margin. Conservative talk radio continued to hammer McCain, with Laura Ingraham saying she was "concerned about the mental stability of the McCain campaign" and Mark Levin continuing his practice of calling him "John McLame".

As the election neared, Giuliani slumped to a battle for third place with Huckabee, while McCain and Romney each had polls showing them in the lead. McCain garnered the late endorsements of Florida Senator and former Chairman of the Republican National Committee Mel Martinez and the highly popular Governor of Florida, Charlie Crist; Crist had reportedly pledged his support to Giuliani, and the Giuliani campaign was described as "visibly upset" by the McCain endorsement.

On January 29, 2008, McCain won the Florida primary and the state's 57 delegates, taking 36% of the total vote. Romney was second with 31% and Giuliani was third at 15%.

=== Super Tuesday ===
After Florida, the campaigns focused their attention on the 21 states voting on February 5, known as Super Tuesday. McCain was seen as the front-runner for the nomination heading in to this most important of primary dates. He had the lead in delegates to the national convention, and on January 30 he was officially endorsed by the withdrawing Giuliani. The candidates sparred at a debate at the Ronald Reagan Presidential Library in Simi Valley, California, on January 30, with former First Lady Nancy Reagan present in the front row. The most heated exchange came as Romney accused McCain of dirty tricks in his misleading Florida statements about Romney having proposed an Iraq withdrawal timetable.

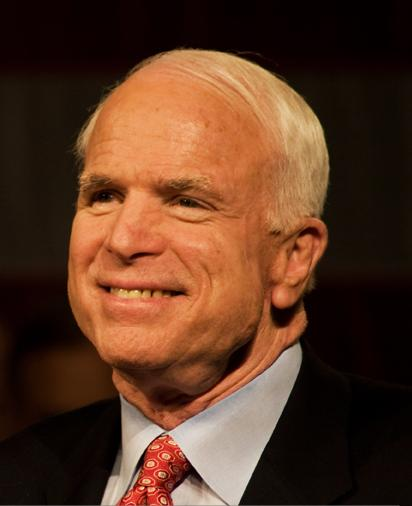
McCain reacts to his Super Tuesday victories during a celebration that night at the Arizona Biltmore Hotel in Phoenix

On January 31, McCain received the important endorsement of Governor of California Arnold Schwarzenegger and began campaigning with him; Schwarzenegger had previously refrained from endorsing either McCain or Giuliani because he counted both men as friends. The same day, Governor Rick Perry of Texas, formerly a supporter of Giuliani, threw his support behind McCain as well. Meanwhile, Romney, still burning about McCain's misleading Iraq withdrawal timetable charge, compared McCain to disgraced former president Richard Nixon, saying that McCain's claim was "reminiscent of the Nixon era" and that "I don't think I want to see our party go back to that kind of campaigning."

McCain won his home state of Arizona, taking all 53 of the state's delegates, and won too the largest of the Super Tuesday prizes, garnering nearly all of California's 173 delegates. McCain also scored wins in Connecticut, Delaware, Illinois, Missouri, New Jersey, New York and Oklahoma.

=== Romney ends campaign ===
Both McCain and Romney addressed the Conservative Political Action Conference (CPAC) in Washington, D.C., on February 7. Romney used his speech to announce the end of his campaign, solidifying McCain's status as the likely Republican nominee. McCain spoke about an hour later, again appealing to conservative uncertainty about his ideology. He focused on his opposition to abortion and gun control, as well as his support for lower taxes and free-market health care solutions. He told the CPAC audience that he arrived in Washington as "a foot soldier in the Reagan Revolution", and addressed the issue of illegal immigration—one of the major issues where conservatives had attacked McCain. He said that "it would be among my highest priorities to secure our borders first", before addressing other immigration laws.

=== More February contests ===
February 9 saw voting in Louisiana, Kansas and Washington state. Huckabee won an easy victory in Kansas, claiming all 36 of the state's delegates to the national convention. Only 14,016 votes were cast, and the McCain campaign expressed no concern over the lightly attended caucus. However, social conservatives had a strong presence in the Kansas Republican party, and the results served to highlight conservative dissatisfaction with the Senator. Louisiana was much closer, but Huckabee won there as well, beating McCain by less than one percentage point. McCain was declared the winner of the Washington caucuses, where 18 delegates were at stake. The February 19 primary would determine the other 19 delegates from the state. After the caucuses, Huckabee's campaign indicated that they would challenge the results.

Next up was the Potomac primary on February 12, with voting in Virginia, Maryland and the District of Columbia. McCain swept the three races and took all 113 delegates which were at stake. The next day, the McCain camp released a memo calling a Huckabee win "mathematically impossible". McCain began to focus on the Democrats, particularly leading candidate Barack Obama, in anticipation of the general election.

On February 14, Mitt Romney officially endorsed McCain. Huckabee vowed to stay in the race, saying, "I may get beat, but I'm not going to quit." A few days later, McCain was endorsed by former president George H. W. Bush, in a move intended to shore up his support among base party elements.

On February 19, McCain continued his winning ways, picking up wins over Huckabee in the Wisconsin primary and the Washington state primary. McCain and Barack Obama engaged in a pointed exchange over Al-Qaeda in Iraq on February 27.

=== New York Times article on lobbyist ===
On February 20, 2008, The New York Times broke a story involving an alleged romantic affair eight years earlier between McCain and lobbyist Vicki Iseman, both of whom deny the allegations. The relationship allegedly existed during McCain's 2000 presidential campaign. In separate interviews with The New York Times, two unnamed former associates of McCain said they "became convinced" that a romantic relationship existed and warned him that he was risking his campaign and his political career. Both said McCain acknowledged behaving inappropriately and that he pledged to keep his distance from Iseman. The associates said they had become disillusioned with the senator, spoke independently of each other and provided details that were corroborated by others.

A McCain spokesperson characterized the story as a "hit and run smear campaign" and "gutter politics" and went on to say, "It is a shame that the New York Times has lowered its standards [...]" Iseman's employer, Lowell Paxson, disputed McCain's assertion that he had never met with Paxson over a Federal Communications Commission matter mentioned in the original New York Times article. The article received widespread criticism among both liberals and conservatives, McCain supporters and non-supporters as well as talk radio personalities. Former staffer to President Bill Clinton and current Hillary Clinton supporter Lanny Davis said the article "had no merit". Stating that he did not support McCain's bid for the White House, Davis, who had himself lobbied for the same cause Iseman lobbied McCain for, said that McCain only wrote a letter to the FCC to ask them to "act soon" and refused to write a letter that supported the sale of the television station the article talked about.

In December 2008, Iseman filed a $27 million defamation lawsuit against The New York Times, alleging that the paper falsely communicated an illicit romantic relationship between her and McCain.

In February 2009, the lawsuit was settled and no money exchanged hands. From the Times coverage of the settlement: "On Thursday, the two sides released a joint statement saying: 'To resolve the lawsuit, Ms. Iseman has accepted The Times's explanation, which will appear in a Note to Readers to be published in the newspaper on February 20, that the article did not state, and The Times did not intend to conclude, that Ms. Iseman had engaged in a romantic affair with Senator McCain or an unethical relationship on behalf of her clients in breach of the public trust.' (and) "a statement from Ms. Iseman's lawyers. They wrote, in part: 'Had this case proceeded to trial, the judicial determination of whether she is entitled to the protections afforded a private citizen would have been the subject of a ferocious, pivotal battle, with Ms. Iseman insisting on her status as a private person and The New York Times asserting that she had entered the public arena, and was therefore fair game.'"

=== March contests—wrapping up the nomination ===
John McCain officially clinched the Republican presidential nomination on March 4, 2008, sweeping the primaries in Ohio, Texas, Rhode Island, and Vermont. That night, Mike Huckabee withdrew from the race and endorsed McCain.

=== Delegate counts ===
2008 Republican presidential primaries delegate count As of June 10, 2008
Candidates	Actual pledged delegates^{1} (1,780 of 1,917)	Estimated total delegates^{2} (2,159 of 2,380; 1,191 needed to win)
John McCain	1,378	1,575
Mike Huckabee	240	278
Mitt Romney	148	271
Ron Paul	14	35
Color key: / 1st place / Candidate has withdrawn
Sources:^{1} "Primary Season Election Results". The New York Times. September 16, 2008. Archived from the original on September 16, 2008.^{2} "Election Center 2008 - Republican Delegate Scorecard". CNN. June 4, 2008.

== General election campaign 2008 ==
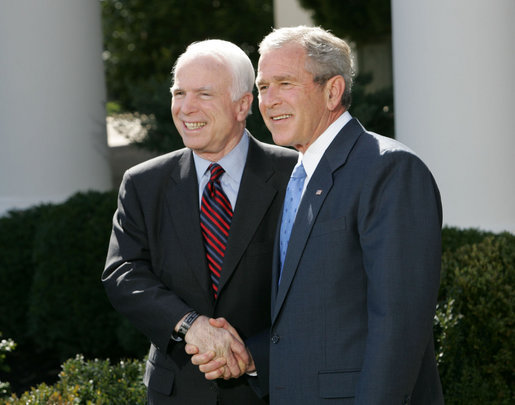
President George W. Bush endorsing Senator McCain at the White House March 5, 2008, following McCain's March 4 primary victory.

=== Main issues ===
The McCain campaign focused on many issues. These issues included national security, education reform, energy independence, and tax cuts to stimulate the economy.

=== Eligibility ===
Article Two of the Constitution sets one of the principal qualifications to be eligible for election of the office of president as being a natural born citizen of the United States. Although McCain was not born within a state of the United States, his status as a natural-born citizen (and future eligibility to be elected to the presidency) may have been assured at birth by either jus sanguinis, since his parents were U.S. citizens, or jus soli, as the Panama Canal Zone was at that time (1936) a United States possession (1903–1979), or both. However, Internet talk questioned whether McCain, who was born at Coco Solo Naval Air Station in Panama, qualified as a natural-born citizen. A bipartisan legal review by Laurence Tribe and Theodore Olson, as well as a unanimous but nonbinding Senate resolution, indicate that McCain does indeed fulfill the requirement. However, University of Arizona constitutional law professor Gabriel J. Chin argues both that the Tribe-Olson opinion is unsound under current law and that McCain was actually granted citizenship by a law which was passed eleven months after McCain's birth, disqualifying him under the Constitution from natural-born citizenship and the presidency. Commenting on the Chin paper, Temple University law and citizenship expert Peter Spiro said, "No court will get close to it, and everyone else is on board, so there's a constitutional consensus, the merits of arguments such as this one aside." Catholic University law professor Sarah Duggan agreed that no legal challenge would prevail, but said only a constitutional amendment could fully resolve the question.

During the general election phase of the campaign, a lawsuit by an American Independent Party member challenging McCain's eligibility was dismissed by a federal judge in San Francisco in September 2008 due both to lack of evidence and lack of standing; U.S. District Court Judge William Alsup also issued an order stating that it was "highly probable" that McCain was a natural born citizen.

The McCain campaign also looked into lawsuits claiming that Barack Obama was not a natural-born citizen, but saw no evidence or chance of success behind them.

=== Bush endorsement ===
On March 5, 2008, President Bush welcomed McCain to the White House and officially endorsed the man who would be his party's standard-bearer in November. The endorsement was seen as helping McCain rally conservatives, and brought with it the promise of much-needed fundraising help heading in to the general election. Democrats painted a different picture, hoping to capitalize on Bush's low approval ratings. The Democratic National Committee said that McCain would offer a "third term of George W. Bush".

=== Establishing himself ===
McCain turned his attention to the November general election, while the Democratic primaries continued to be a battle between Clinton and Obama. McCain faced the challenge of staying in the news as the Democrats garnered headlines with their protracted nomination battle, which showed no signs of ending before the Democratic National Convention in late August. However, having the nomination locked up early also gave McCain time to build a national organization and put his general election strategy into action for the six months leading up to the Republican National Convention. McCain planned to raise money and visit several sites in the U.S. before embarking on a tour of Europe and the Middle East as part of a congressional delegation. McCain did not immediately indicate when he would make his choice for vice president. Even before his March 4 primary wins, McCain indicated that he would campaign "everywhere" in the general election—including traditionally Democratic states like California, New Jersey and Connecticut. A Wall Street Journal/NBC News poll released March 12 showed McCain in a virtual tie with both Obama and Clinton in hypothetical November matchups. In an attempt to make up for his fundraising disadvantage in relation to the Democratic candidates, the campaign merged its resources with the Republican National Committee, and named former Hewlett-Packard CEO Carly Fiorina head of the "Victory 2008" committee charged with fundraising and Get Out The Vote efforts. The campaign also announced that it would use an unorthodox organizational structure, opting to have several regional campaign directors rather than one centralized staff.

McCain began his overseas trip on March 16, arriving in Baghdad to meet with U.S. military officials as well as Iraqi political leaders. While the campaign was not involved in the trip, which was official Senate business, it served as a chance for McCain to highlight his credentials in foreign affairs, seen to be the main strength of his candidacy. After Iraq, the group planned to travel to Israel, London and Paris.

Polls released later in March showed McCain ahead of both Clinton and Obama in hypothetical general election matchups. Both leads were above the margin of error in the polls by Zogby International and Rasmussen Reports.

=== Nancy Reagan endorsement ===
A boost to McCain's campaign came on March 25, when former First Lady Nancy Reagan endorsed the Senator at her home in Bel Air, Los Angeles, California. Reagan released a statement, reading, "John McCain has been a good friend for over thirty years. My husband and I first came to know him as a returning Vietnam War POW, and were impressed by the courage he had shown through his terrible ordeal. I believe John's record and experience have prepared him well to be our next president." Standing with Reagan, McCain said, "This is an important, most important kind of expression of confidence in my ability to lead the party that I could have." McCain's friendship with Nancy Reagan had survived a period of coldness following his divorce from his first wife Carol, of whom the Reagans were quite fond.

=== Reiterating and elaborating positions ===
On March 26, McCain gave his first major speech on foreign policy since securing the nomination. While McCain warned that national security could not be achieved through "passive" measures, he sounded a conciliatory tone in regards to foreign policy in general. Speaking to the World Affairs Council in Los Angeles, he stressed the need for more cooperation with allies, called for nuclear disarmament and said that he "detest[s]" war. He stated that America's power "does not mean we can do whatever we want, whenever we want".

On March 31, McCain began a "biographical tour", visiting several places that were key to his early life and military career.

In early April, McCain said he had compiled a list of roughly 20 potential running mates, and that he hoped to have selected a vice president well before the Republican Convention in September.

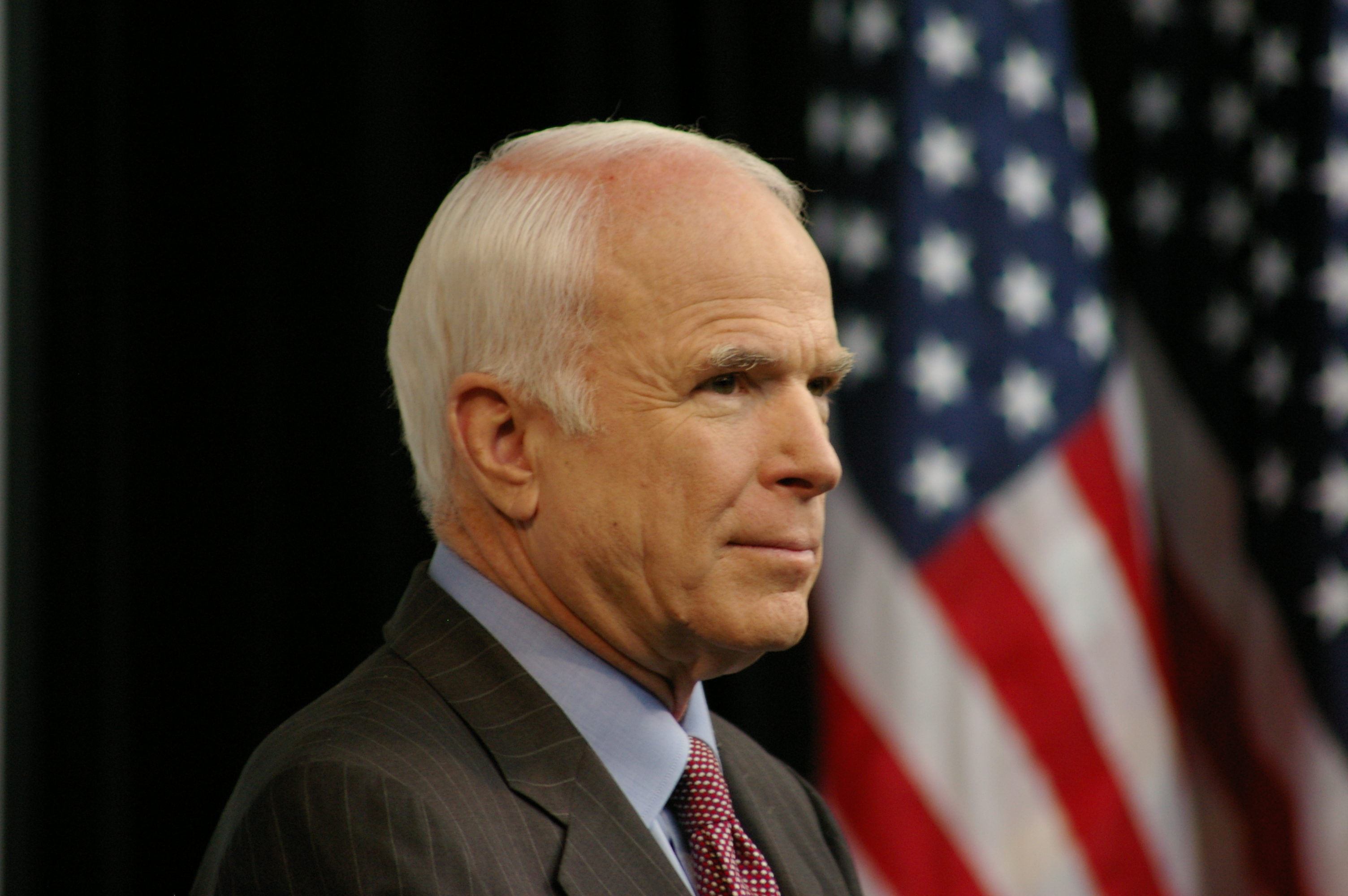
Waiting to make nuclear policy proposals in May 27, 2008, speech at Denver, Colorado.

Foreign policy and the Iraq War were again in the campaign spotlight on April 8, 2008. McCain questioned General David Petraeus, the top U.S. commander in Iraq, during the latter's testimony before the Senate Armed Services Committee. McCain told the committee that a promise of withdrawal would be "reckless" and a "failure of moral and political leadership". While McCain was supportive of Petraeus, he questioned the general on recent outbreaks of violence and some failures among the Iraqi military.

Despite the earlier opposition from conservatives, in April 2008, there were signs that the Republican Party base was coalescing behind McCain's candidacy. A CBS News/New York Times poll showed that McCain was viewed favorably by 78 percent of conservatives, and unfavorably by only 18 percent. This was the same percentage who had an unfavorable opinion of George W. Bush at the same time in 2000. On May 5, 2008, the McCain campaign announced the launch of a Spanish-language site call Bienvenidos McCain or "McCain Welcomes". It presented the candidate's positions and appeals in Spanish.

During a May 15 speech in Columbus, Ohio, McCain laid out his vision for January 2013, which would be the end of his first term had he won the presidency. He predicted that the Iraq War would be won by that time, and that most American troops would be out of the country. He pledged a bipartisan approach to governing a robust economy as well, and the implementation of a flat tax rate.

=== Campaign staff departures due to new lobbyist rules ===
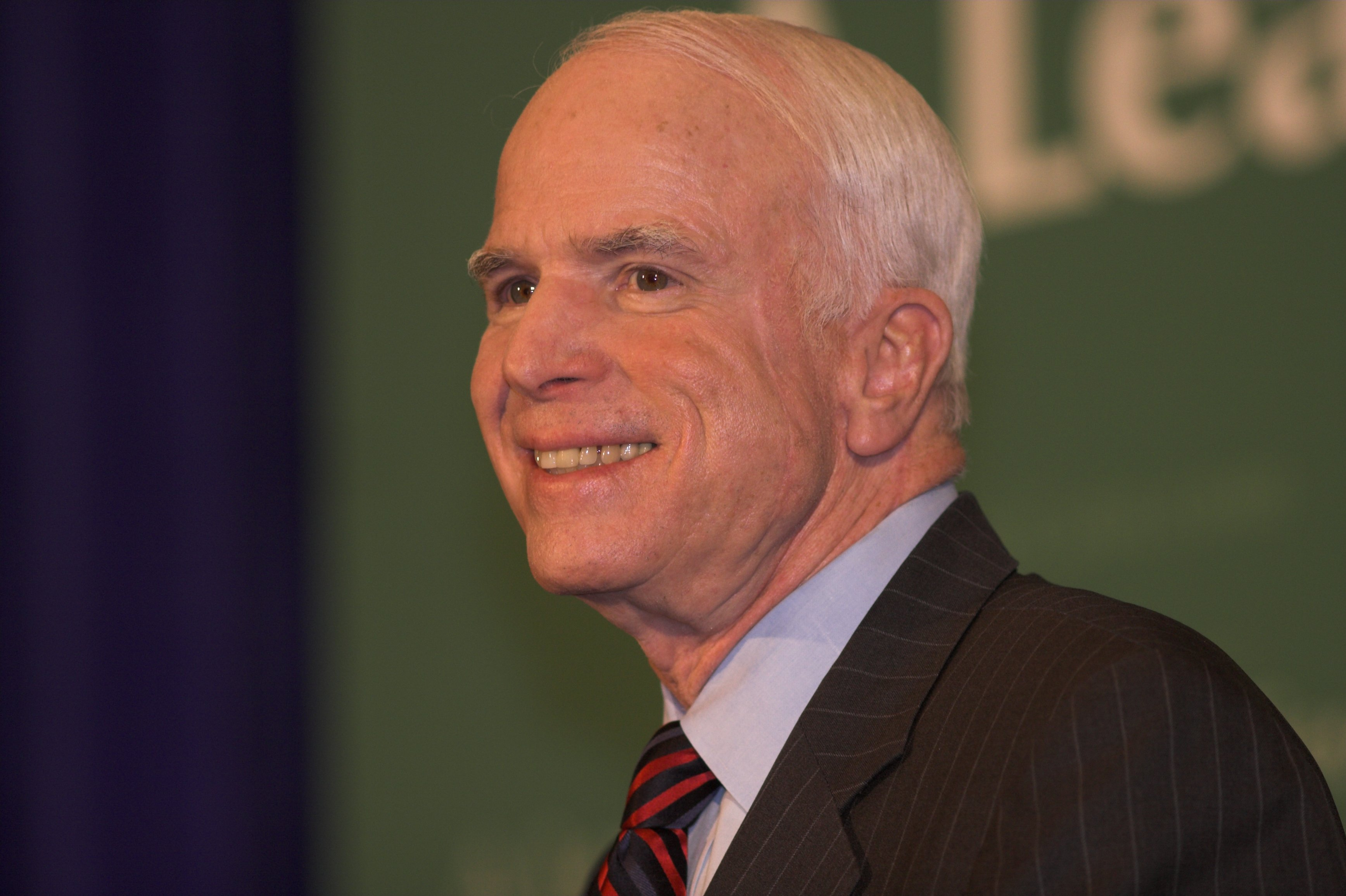
McCain at a campaign rally in Kenner, Louisiana, in June 2008

During much of 2008, McCain faced criticism that significant numbers of lobbyists were top members of his campaign staff; the associations made his reputation as a Washington reformer who fought lobbyists and special interests open to attack from political opponents. In May 2008, the campaign issued new rules regarding possible lobbying or other conflict-of-interest entanglements, which required campaign workers to either cut ties to lobbying groups or outside political groups that did political advertising, or leave the campaign. The rules also looked forward, and stated that "anyone serving in a McCain administration must commit not to lobby the administration during his presidency."

After the new rules were issued, two campaign staffers, regional campaign manager Doug Davenport and Republican National Convention chief Doug Goodyear, both of whom had represented the Burmese military government, departed. So too did Eric Burgeson, who had lobbied the U.S. government on energy issues. Republican political consultant Craig Shirley left the campaign due to ties with anti-Hillary Clinton group Stop Her Now. National finance co-chair Tom Loeffler left the campaign due to his lobbying group's work for Saudi Arabia and other foreign countries. Other top campaign staff such as campaign manager Rick Davis (who devised the new rules), strategist Charles Black, and foreign policy advisor Randy Scheunemann, had already stopped such activities and remained with the campaign. McCain was criticized by Campaign Money Watch and MoveOn.org for retaining Black, but Public Citizen came to McCain's defense, saying that "Regardless of how many lobbyists are working on his campaign or raising money for him, John McCain has fought for 14 long, hard years for reforms that seriously limit lobbyists' power." Some other lobbyists and academics said that despite highly publicized abuses, lobbyists were an important part of the governmental process, and that the campaign-time criticisms and reactions were grandstanding. Meanwhile, outside Republicans feared the lobbying rules activities were hampering the McCain campaign, which was lagging in organizational and fundraising progress.

As of May 19, 2008, McCain had at least 134 lobbyists involved with his campaign, either directly or as fundraisers.

=== Barack Obama the presumptive Democratic nominee ===
Barack Obama became the Democratic presumptive nominee on June 3. McCain immediately proposed a series of ten joint town hall meetings with him, at which the two could engage each other, beginning the next week. Obama first agreed in principle to the notion, but later rejected McCain's proposal, offering instead one town-hall event on the Independence Day holiday and four traditional debate-style joint appearances. McCain, in turn, rejected that proposal saying that Americans would pay less attention to the town-hall appearance due to the holiday. He was quoted as having said, "I want the American people to have the exposure to a number of town hall meetings, not just one." Following the exchange, former first lady Nancy Reagan as well as Luci Baines Johnson and Lynda Bird Johnson Robb, daughters of former president Lyndon B. Johnson, invited both McCain and Obama to town-hall appearances at the Reagan and Johnson presidential libraries. McCain accepted the invitation, though the candidates never reached agreement on the event formats.

Following Obama's victory over Hillary Clinton, and taking advantage of a divide within the Democratic Party, McCain encouraged Clinton supporters to abandon their party and vote for him in November. The McCain campaign viewed the Democratic divide as an opportunity to court the "Reagan Democrats" who supported Clinton, and began sending high-profile female supporters to states that Clinton won in an effort to garner their votes.

=== Gramm departs ===
Former senator Phil Gramm was a co-chairman of the McCain campaign, and McCain's chief economic adviser. He stepped down from the campaign on July 18, 2008, about a week after he made remarks to The Washington Times about the 2008 financial crisis. Gramm had said, "You've heard of mental depression; this is a mental recession," and "We have sort of become a nation of whiners. You just hear this constant whining." McCain had quickly repudiated Gramm's remarks, saying "Phil Gramm doesn't speak for me, I speak for me. I strongly disagree." When asked if Gramm was still in contention for the U.S. Treasury Secretary position as previously speculated, McCain had said, "I think Senator Gramm would be in serious consideration for ambassador of Belarus, though I'm not sure the citizens of Minsk would welcome that." Gramm said upon leaving that he had become a distraction to the campaign.

=== Obama-as-celebrity TV advertisement ===
A McCain campaign ad crafted by Fred Davis compared Barack Obama to known celebrities such as Britney Spears and Paris Hilton, and questioned his readiness to lead while criticizing his energy policy. The ad received criticism from The New York Times and MSNBC for claims that it featured racial undertones reminiscent of the attacks against Harold Ford during the 2006 Tennessee Senate Election. The ads resulted in a tightening of Obama's lead in polls. After the election, Obama deputy campaign manager Steve Hildebrand said: "It was the first time during the general election where I started to freak out... I thought if they can brand him as a celebrity rather than as a serious leader we're going to be in serious trouble."

=== Running mate selection ===
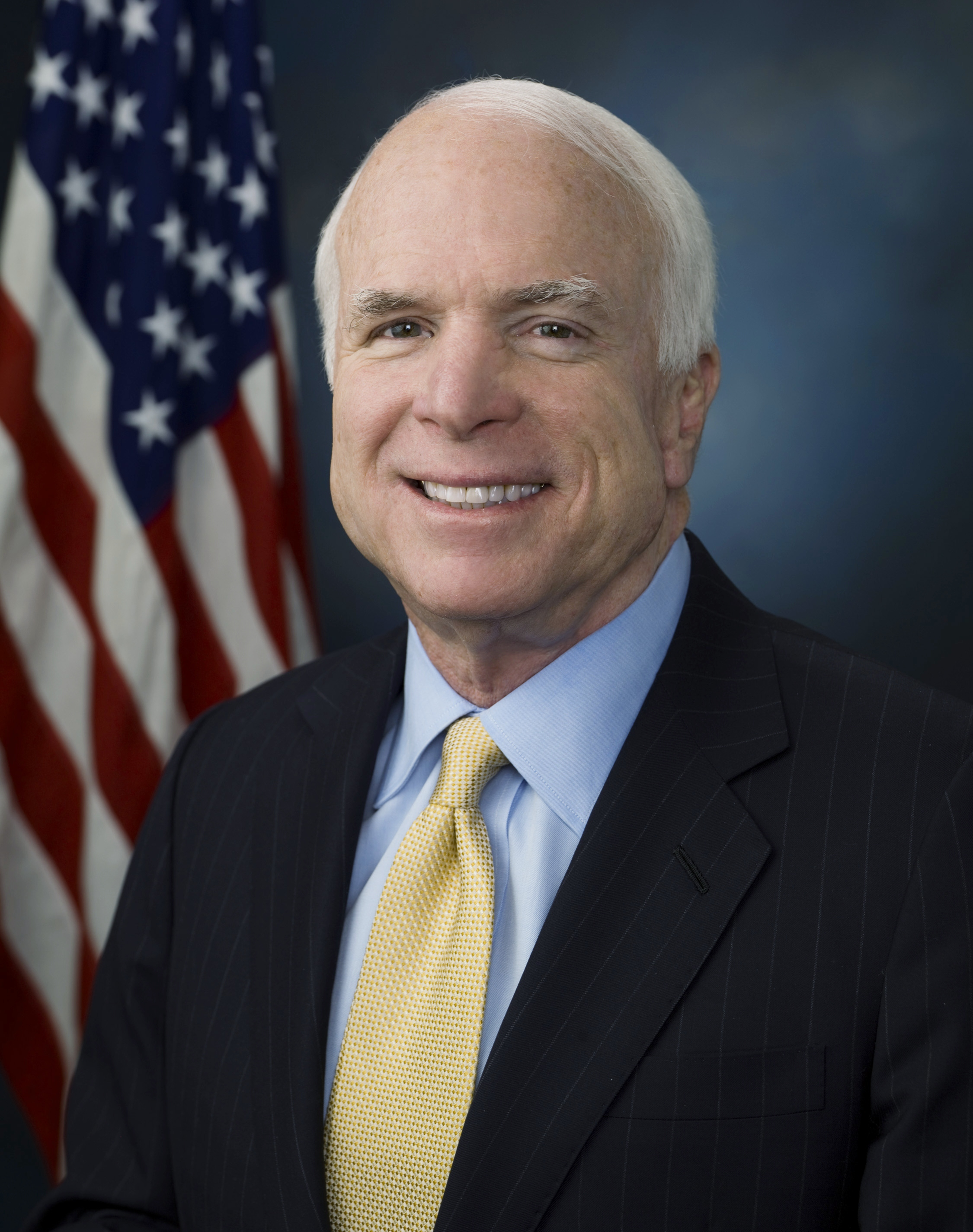
- Presidential nominee
- John McCain
- Arizona

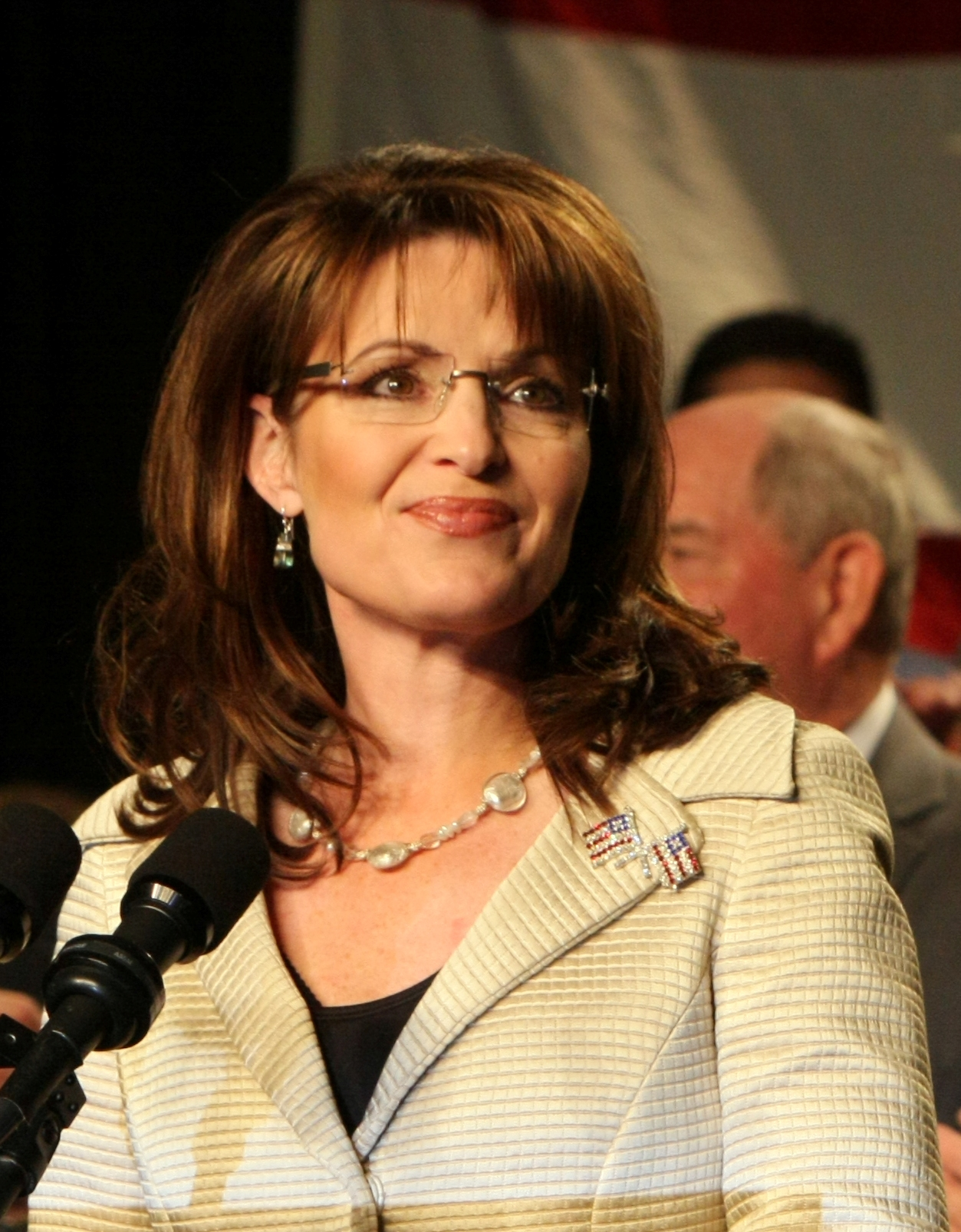
- Vice presidential nominee
- Sarah Palin
- Alaska

McCain began a search for a running mate to join the Republican ticket after clinching the Republican nomination. Former candidates Mitt Romney and Mike Huckabee were mentioned as possibilities, as were many other leaders in the Republican Party and the business world. Over Memorial Day weekend, McCain invited Romney, Florida Governor Charlie Crist, and Louisiana Governor Bobby Jindal to his Sedona, Arizona, ranch for informal get-togethers intended to assess personal chemistry for possible running mate selection.

McCain then announced plans to reveal his running mate the day following the conclusion of the Democratic National Convention, and just a few days before the start of the Republican National Convention. During the running mate deliberations, McCain had favored Joe Lieberman, who shared his romantic sense of righteousness and honor. But the opposition from social conservatives, who objected to Lieberman's pro-choice views, was too strong, and a Lieberman pick might have caused a floor fight at the convention. McCain wanted someone who would shake up the race and reinforce his image as a maverick, so he decided against more conventional choices on his short list including Romney and Governor Tim Pawlenty.

According to the book Game Change, on the weekend before John McCain made his vice presidential pick, McCain's advisor Arthur Culvahouse asked attorney Ted Frank to prepare a written vetting report on Sarah Palin:

Thrown together from scratch in less than forty hours, the document highlighted her vulnerabilities: "Democrats upset at McCain's anti-Obama 'celebrity' advertisements will mock Palin as an inexperienced beauty queen whose main national exposure was a photo-spread in Vogue in February 2008. Even in campaigning for governor, she made a number of gaffes, and the Anchorage Daily News expressed concern that she often seemed 'unprepared or over her head' in a campaign run by a friend.

On August 29 (McCain's 72nd birthday), at the Nutter Center of Wright State University in Dayton, Ohio, McCain's running mate was revealed in a surprise pick as Alaska Governor Sarah Palin. McCain had only talked to her a few times, and the campaign's vetting operation had mostly relied on Internet searches to check her background. Palin's career in Alaska had shown maverick tendencies similar to McCain's, and McCain hoped that Palin's youth, reformist record, appeal to social conservatives, and appeal to disaffected Hillary Clinton voters would outweigh her lack of national and international visibility and experience. One of McCain's aides privately remarked via an American football metaphor during the announcement: "We just threw long."

=== Convention ===
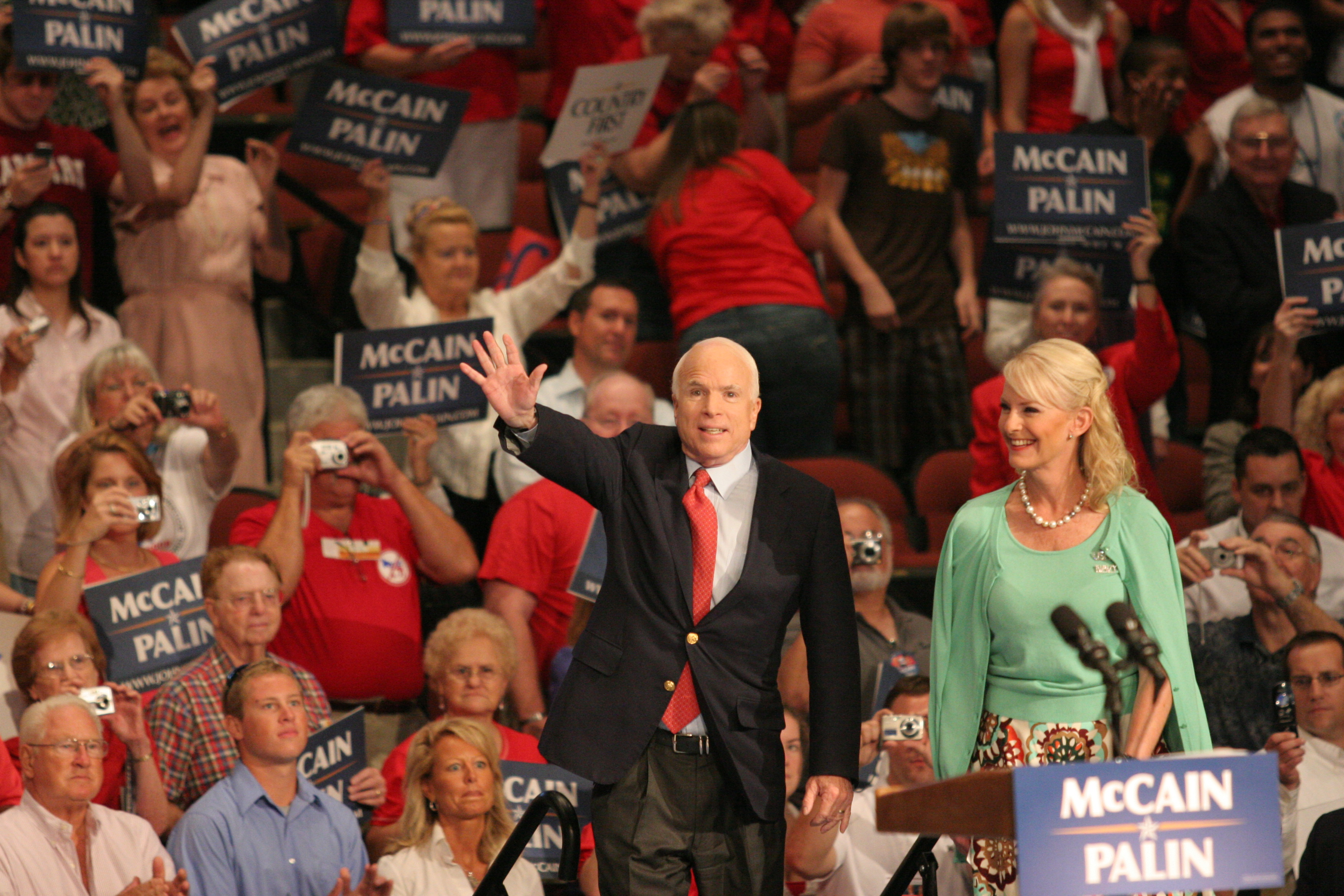
The McCains campaign on September 15, 2008, following the Republican National Convention

At the 2008 Republican National Convention, McCain was formally nominated by roll call on the night of September 3, following Palin's vice presidential nomination acceptance speech. McCain himself appeared onstage at the convention for the first time following her speech, telling the cheering delegates, "Don't you think we made the right choice for the next vice president of the United States?" McCain accepted his party's nomination the following night.

According to Nielsen Media Research, almost 39 million Americans watched McCain deliver his acceptance speech, while 37 million watched Palin the night before. Television viewership was unusually high for both parties' conventions, indicating that the election season was producing compelling drama.

=== Sarah Palin's vice presidential candidacy ===
==== Initial reaction ====
After announcing Palin as the presumptive vice presidential nominee, the McCain campaign received $7 million in contributions in a single day. According to a Washington Post/ABC News survey published on September 9, 2008, he had gained huge support among white women voters since the announcement; he had not only surpassed Obama in white women voters, but also amassed a lead of five percentage points in the Gallup polls. John Zogby found that the effects of Palin's selection were helping the McCain ticket since "She has high favorability numbers, and has unified the Republican Party."

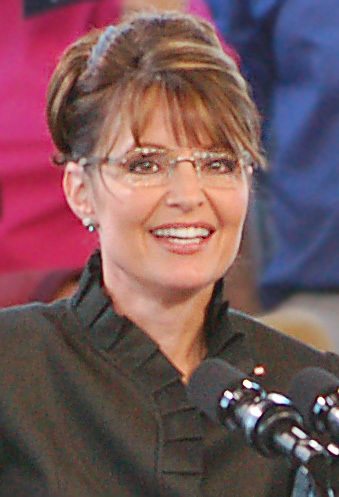
Sarah Palin at campaign rally in Carson City, Nevada, September 13, 2008

The choice received generally positive reactions from Republicans and conservatives. Victor Davis Hanson stated "the timing and choice were inspired", and Mark Steyn stated he was "happy" over the choice. Connecticut Governor M. Jodi Rell said of Palin, "She is strong. She is capable. She is articulate," and suggested opponents should not underestimate her. Independent-Democratic Senator Joe Lieberman stated that McCain made a "bold choice" in picking a "maverick who has done exactly the same thing at the state level that he's done at the federal level". However, some Republicans did not receive the choice favorably. Charles Krauthammer of The Washington Post wrote, "The Palin selection completely undercuts the argument about Obama's inexperience and readiness to lead. . . . To gratuitously undercut the remarkably successful 'Is he ready to lead' line of attack seems near suicidal." David Frum of National Review wrote: "The longer I think about it, the less well this selection sits with me . . . If it were your decision, and you were putting your country first, would you put an untested small-town mayor [sic] a heartbeat away from the presidency?". Following an NBC interview, Peggy Noonan commented, "It's over . . . the most qualified? No."

Republicans in Palin's home state, Alaska, had mixed reactions to the news. Alaska Attorney General Talis Colberg, a Palin appointee, remarked that, "It's wonderful. It was an emotional thing to see the governor walk out with her family and I say, wow, I work for her." Alaska State Senate President Lyda Green, a Republican who had repeatedly sparred with Palin after she became governor, remarked, "She's not prepared to be governor. How can she be prepared to be vice president or president?" Larry Persily, a Palin staffer, and Jim Whitaker, the Republican mayor of Fairbanks, indicated their support of Palin as Governor, but questioned whether she was ready to serve as vice president. Other Alaskan politicians, such as Republican Gail Phillips, expressed surprise.

Kari Sleight, publisher of the Mat-Su Valley Frontiersman, which covered much of Palin's life in Wasilla, endorsed Palin for Vice-President. "While some question Palin's experience, they cannot question her leadership. A person is either a good leader or not, and Palin has exhibited great leadership skills in all positions she's held. There is an argument to be made that leadership, and the qualities that define a good leader, are inherently more important than experience."

Palin's positions and policies became the focus of "intense media attention" and "scrutiny" following her selection. Expectations from her speech at the Republican National Convention was heavily covered by the media. Some Republicans argued that Palin was subjected to unreasonable media coverage, and a Rasmussen survey showed that slightly more than half of Americans believed that the press was "trying to hurt" Palin with negative coverage, a sentiment referenced by Palin in her acceptance speech. A poll taken just after the speech found that Palin was then slightly more popular than either Obama or McCain with a 58% favorability rating. Palin was also a draw with Catholic voters; the poll found that 54% favor Palin and 42% find her unfavorable, a 12% difference, while Joe Biden was viewed favorable by 49% to 47% unfavorable.

Palin also became a "ubiquitous presence on newsstands", appearing on the cover of both Newsweek and Time, among others. The appearance on the cover of Time was particularly notable as Jay Carney, the newsmagazine's Washington bureau chief, has been vocally critical on what he has said is a lack of media access to Palin, concerns which were dismissed by the McCain campaign.

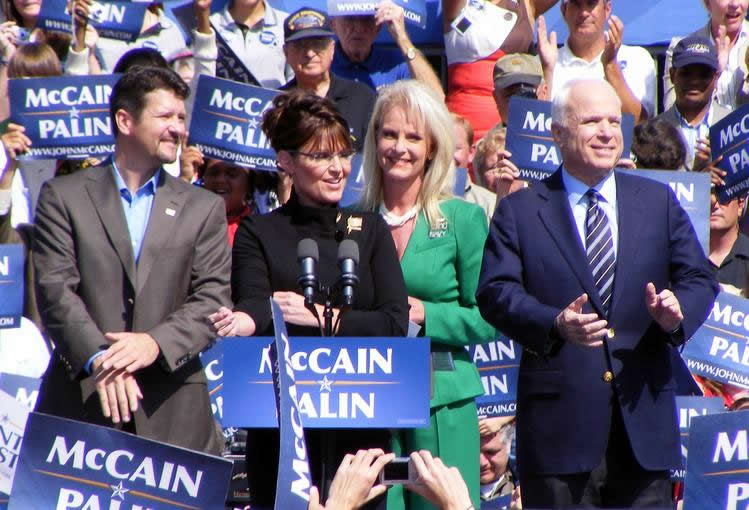
The Palins and McCains campaigning in Fairfax, Virginia, September 10, 2008, following the Republican National Convention

Former New York City Mayor Giuliani said that Palin was more qualified to be president than Democratic presidential nominee Obama, citing Palin's executive experience, saying of her, "She's vetoed legislation, she's taken on corruption, and in her party, and won. She took on the oil companies and won. She administered a budget successfully," and of Obama, "He's never run a city, he's never run a state, he's never run a business, he's never administered a payroll, he's never led people in crisis". He also stated, if Sarah Palin had been president when the U.S. came under attack on September 11, 2001, he is confident she would have been able to handle the crisis.

According to the Washington Times, Palin's faith made her a "favorite with the staunchly pro-Israel neoconservative elements in the Republican Party". Palin displayed an Israeli flag in her governor's office in Juneau. Palin received a strong endorsement from the Republican Jewish Coalition, and has been described as a "direct affront to all Jewish Americans" by Democratic Congressman Robert Wexler of Florida, and as being "totally out of step with Jewish public opinion" by the National Jewish Democratic Council.

Obama commented on Palin in an interview with 60 Minutes:

Well, I don't know Governor Palin, I have not met her before. I had a brief conversation with her after she was selected to congratulate her and wish her luck—but, not too much luck!—on the campaign trail. And she seems to have a compelling life story. Obviously, she's a fine mother and an up-and-coming public servant. So, it's too early for me to gauge what kind of running mate she'll be. My sense is that she subscribes to John McCain's agenda. And ultimately, this [election] is going to be about where I want to take the country and where Joe Biden wants to take the country, and where John McCain and his running mate want to take the country.

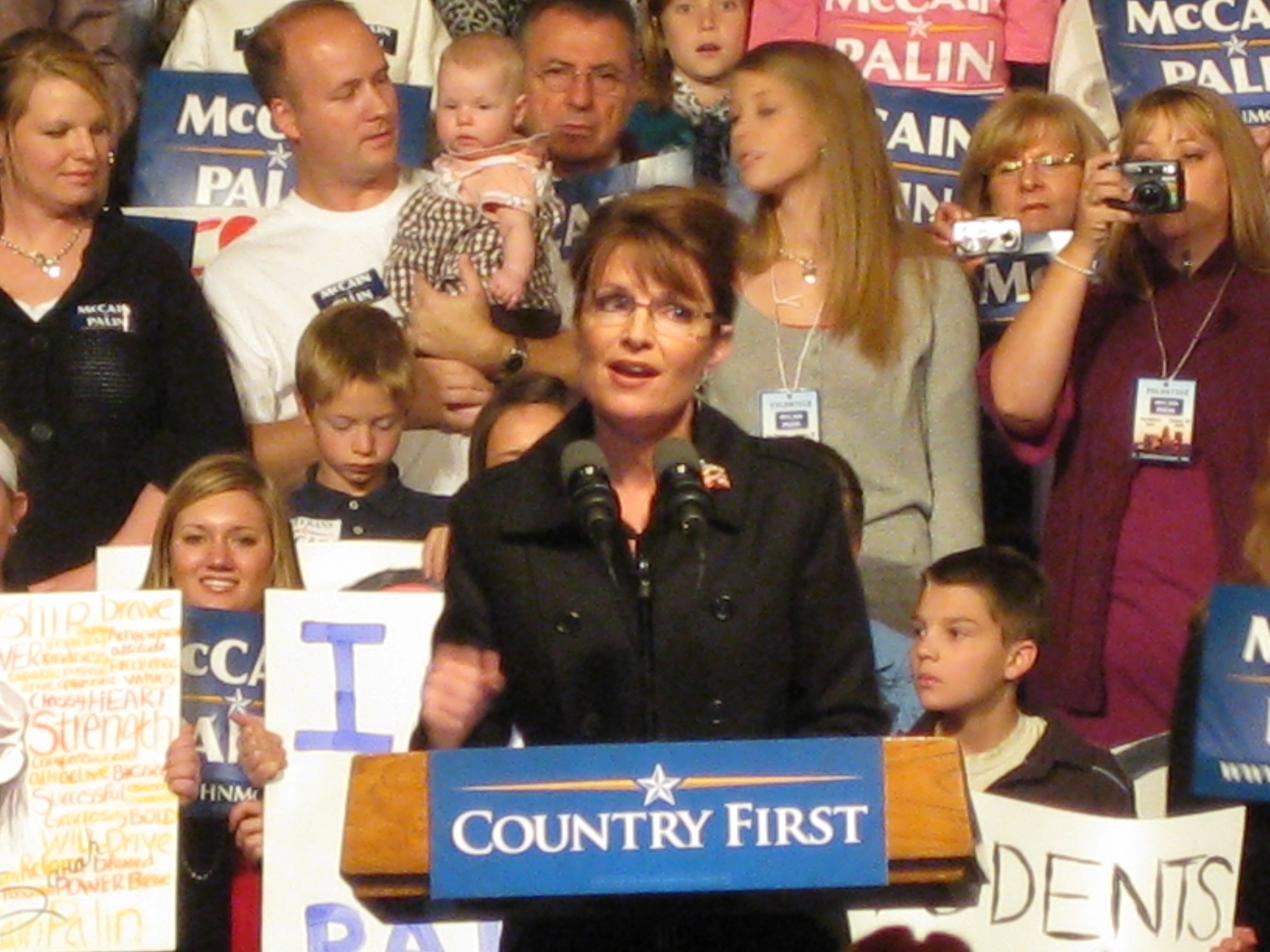
Sarah Palin at a campaign rally in Des Moines, Iowa

==== Vice presidential campaign developments ====
By September 2008, Governor Palin had submitted to two media interviews, the first with ABC's Charles Gibson, and the second with Fox News's Sean Hannity. Gibson asked Palin, "Do you agree with the Bush doctrine?," to which Palin responded, "In what respect, Charlie?" After asking Palin for her definition, Gibson defined the concept to be for the United States to "have the right of anticipatory self-defense". Gibson also asked Palin about a prayer she had offered with regard to soldiers in Iraq. Commentators' reactions varied. Those generally critical of Palin's candidacy applauded Gibson's penetrating questions and thought aspects of Palin's responses showed that she was not ready to serve as vice president, whereas those generally supportive of her candidacy took a more positive view of her performance.

During the campaign, some pointed out alleged differences between Palin's positions as a gubernatorial candidate and her position as a vice presidential candidate. While campaigning for vice president, Palin touted her stance on "the bridge to nowhere" as an example of her opposition to pork barrel spending. In her nomination acceptance speech and on the campaign trail, Palin often said, "I told the Congress 'thanks, but no thanks,' on that Bridge to Nowhere." Although Palin was originally a main proponent of the Gravina Island Bridge, McCain–Palin television advertisements asserted that Palin "stopped the Bridge to Nowhere". These statements have been widely questioned or described as misleading or exaggerations by many media groups in the U.S. Newsweek remarked, "Now she talks as if she always opposed the funding."

After McCain announced Palin as his running mate, Newsweek and Time put Palin on their magazine covers, as some of the media alleged that McCain's campaign was restricting press access to Palin by allowing only three one-on-one interviews and no press conferences with her. Among the reasons that the news organizations criticized the restrictions was Palin's first major interview, with Charles Gibson of ABC News, met with mixed reviews. Her interview five days later with Fox News's Sean Hannity focuses on many of the same questions from Gibson's interview. However, Palin's performance in her third interview, with Katie Couric of CBS News, was widely criticized. Palin's responses to several of Couric's questions were considered embarrassing, most notably failing to name any newspapers she read. The fallout from the interview prompted a decline in her poll numbers, concern among Republicans that she was becoming a political liability, and calls from some conservative commentators for Palin to resign from the presidential ticket. Other conservatives remained ardent in their support for Palin, accusing the columnists of elitism. Following this interview, some Republicans, including Mitt Romney and Bill Kristol, questioned the McCain campaign's strategy of sheltering Palin from unscripted encounters with the press.

Palin was reported to have prepared intensively for the October 2 vice presidential debate with Democratic Vice-Presidential nominee Joe Biden at Washington University in St. Louis. Some Republicans suggested that Palin's performance in the interviews would improve public perceptions of her debate performance by lowering expectations. Polling from CNN, Fox and CBS found that while Palin exceeded most voters' expectations, they felt that Biden had won the debate.

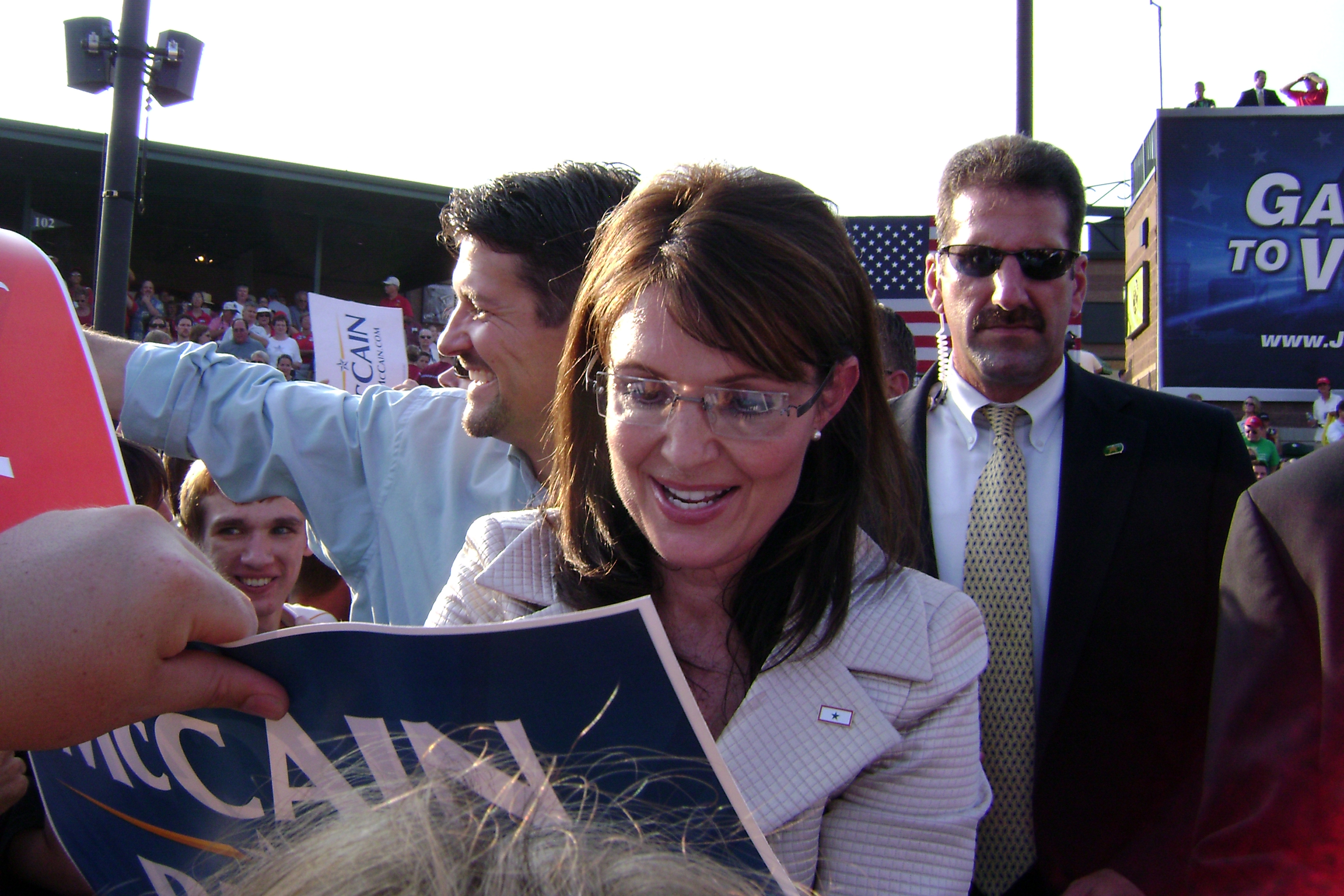
Palin signing an autograph at a campaign rally in O'Fallon, Missouri

Upon returning to the campaign trail after her debate preparation, Palin stepped up her attacks on the Democratic candidate for president, Senator Barack Obama. At a fundraising event, Palin explained her new aggressiveness, saying, "There does come a time when you have to take the gloves off and that time is right now." In a campaign appearance on October 4, Palin accused Obama of regarding America as "so imperfect that he's palling around with terrorists who would target their own country". The accusation referred to Obama's contacts with Bill Ayers, a founder of the 1960s radical group called the Weathermen, and a New York Times article describing such contacts. The Obama campaign called the allegation a "smear", citing newspaper commentaries critical of Palin's attack. Obama has condemned the Weathermen's violent actions. The criticism of Obama based on his purported relationship with Ayers was subsequently carried on by McCain himself.

By late October, voter reactions to Palin had grown increasingly negative, especially among independents and other voters concerned about her qualifications. Republican and former Secretary of State Colin Powell endorsed Obama on October 19 and said of Palin, "Now that we have had a chance to watch her for some seven weeks, I don't believe she's ready to be president of the United States, which is the job of the vice president." A McCain aide said Palin had "gone rogue", placing her own future political interests ahead of the McCain–Palin ticket, directly contradicting her running mate's positions and disobeying directions from campaign managers. (A year after the election, Palin would title her memoir after this accusation.)

Although McCain said later in life that he expressed regret for not choosing the independent Senator Joe Lieberman as his running mate instead, he consistently defended Palin's performances in later years.

==== RNC campaign expenditures ====
The Republican National Committee's monthly financial disclosure report for September 2008 showed that $150,000 had been spent on Palin's wardrobe, hair and makeup as well as clothing and accessories for her family. Campaign finance experts expressed concern about the legality of the spending and the tax implications to Palin. A campaign spokesperson responded saying that the clothing will be donated to charity following the election. By January 2009, it was reported that the clothing was stored in garbage bags at the Republican National Convention headquarters. In March 2009, a spokesperson for Palin stated that the clothes had been donated to charities The spending was later reviewed and approved by the U.S. Federal Election Commission by a 5–0 vote.

Another controversy erupted when it was revealed that her campaign paid makeup artist, Amy Strozzi, a sum of $22,800, making her the highest paid staffer on the McCain campaign. This prompted calls from Republican donors to "return the money".

==== Legacy ====
The New York Times journalist David Brooks says that, in nominating Palin as his running mate, McCain "took a disease that was running through the Republican party—anti-intellectualism, disrespect for facts—and he put it right at the centre of the party". Laura McGann in Vox says that McCain gave the "reality TV politics" and Tea Party movement more political legitimacy, as well as solidifying "the Republican Party's comfort with a candidate who would say absurdities . . . unleashing a political style and a values system that animated the Tea Party movement and laid the groundwork for a Trump presidency".

=== Post-convention poll surge and retreat ===
After the Republican National Convention in early September, McCain saw his poll numbers increase nationwide, traced in part to movement among previously undecided voters.

From mid-September to mid-October, however, the trend lines were all in Obama's direction. For example, the RealClearPolitics electoral map went from an Obama 228–163 electoral vote lead on August 20 to a 227–207 McCain lead on September 17 and then back to a 306–157 Obama lead on October 24.

=== 2008 financial crisis ===
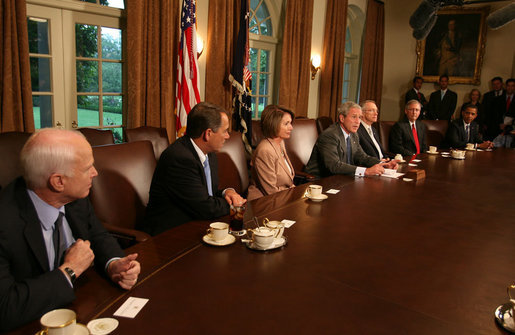
McCain (far left) participates in a bipartisan meeting with President Bush and members of Congress, including Barack Obama (far right), regarding the Emergency Economic Stabilization Act of 2008, September 25, 2008

In September 2008, the subprime mortgage crisis worsened and precipitated the 2008 financial crisis; the federal takeover of Fannie Mae and Freddie Mac was quickly followed by the bankruptcy of Lehman Brothers, sale of Merrill Lynch, and government bailout of American International Group. At first McCain emphasized that "the fundamentals of our economy are strong", but when questioned on that statement he clarified that the fundamentals refer to the American workforce. He then recast his message into emphasizing that the country's economy was in "a total crisis", condemning "greed", and proposing that a national commission be set up to study the situation, akin to the 9/11 Commission. He later commented on the Federal Reserve loan of $85 billion to AIG by saying, "I didn't want to do that...and I don't think anybody I know wanted to do that." McCain then said that government regulators had been "asleep at the switch" and said if he were president he would fire U.S. Securities and Exchange Commission chairman Christopher Cox.

On September 24, McCain announced that he would "suspend" his campaign and seek to delay a debate with Barack Obama scheduled for September 26 so that he could work with Congress toward a reworking of and agreement on the Paulson financial rescue plan. McCain urged Obama to do the same, but Obama did not. McCain's intervention helped dissatisfied House Republicans forestall a bailout plan that was otherwise close to agreement between the White House, Senate Republicans, and Congressional Democrats. At a bipartisan meeting at the White House on September 25 (pictured) McCain came across as unconstructive and ineffectual to Bush, who felt that McCain had forced him to hold a pointless meeting and then had said nothing at it.

Two days later, McCain announced that he would resume his campaign, and he went ahead with the debate. Some commentators questioned whether the campaign had ever in fact been suspended, as McCain ads continued to play, McCain spokesmen continued giving statements criticizing Obama, and McCain campaign offices remained open, while McCain himself continued to make speeches and give interviews.

The revised plan, the $700 billion Emergency Economic Stabilization Act of 2008, failed a House vote on September 29, with large-scale opposition from House Republicans. On October 1, a similar bill, HR1424, passed the Senate 74–25 with McCain voting in favor.

=== Symbols ===
==== Joe the Plumber ====
"Joe the Plumber", making reference to Samuel Joseph Wurzelbacher, was used as an example of middle-class Americans during the 2008 U.S. presidential election season. Wurzelbacher was videotaped questioning Democratic candidate Barack Obama about his small business tax policy during a campaign stop in Ohio. He received prominence when he was mentioned frequently as "Joe the Plumber" in exchanges between Republican candidate McCain and Obama during the third presidential debate on October 15, 2008. After that "Joe the Plumber" was often used by the McCain campaign and the media as a metaphor for middle class Americans and to refer to Wurzelbacher himself.

==== Tito the Builder ====
Tito Muñoz, also known as Tito the Builder, received substantial media attention for various campaign activities. Muñoz publicly defended Joe Wurzelbacher in front of the media. Muñoz also campaigned with Sarah Palin. Consequently, Tito Muñoz received substantial media attention. Muñoz, a Colombian immigrant, is presently a small construction company owner and a United States citizen. He became known for wearing a yellow hard hat with a McCain–Palin bumper sticker and an orange reflector jacket, as well as appearing on television wearing sunglasses when he attended a campaign rally for John McCain in Leesburg, Virginia. At the rally, he introduced Sarah Palin. He also had a confrontation with reporters. Will Rabbe, of the Independent Film Channel, has posted a video about Muñoz and his interaction with reporters. Five days before the election, Muñoz appeared on Fox News' 'Hannity & Colmes. Muñoz told Alan Colmes that he became involved in the 2008 presidential election by giving newspapers "hiding the truth about Obama" a piece of his mind.

=== Debates and final stretch ===
After Obama declined McCain's suspension suggestion, McCain went ahead with the debate on September 26 as scheduled in Oxford, Mississippi, and as moderated by Jim Lehrer. On October 1, McCain voted in favor of a revised $700 billion rescue plan. Another debate was held on October 7; like the first one, polls afterward suggested that Obama had won it. A final presidential debate occurred on October 15. During and after it, McCain compared Obama's proposed policies to socialism, specifically making reference to the term "redistributionist", and often invoked Joe the Plumber as a symbol of American small business dreams that would be thwarted by an Obama presidency. McCain barred using the Jeremiah Wright controversy in ads against Obama, but the campaign did frequently criticize Obama regarding his purported relationship with Bill Ayers.

On October 10, 2008, a female McCain supporter at a rally in Minnesota said she did not trust Barack Obama because "he's an Arab." McCain's rallies had become increasingly vitriolic, with hecklers denigrating Obama and with rallygoers displaying a growing anti-Arab, anti-Muslim, and anti-African-American sentiment. McCain replied to the woman, "No ma'am. He's a decent family man, citizen, that I just happen to have disagreements with on fundamental issues." McCain's response was considered one of the finer moments of the campaign and was still being viewed several years later as a marker for civility in American politics. However, several commentators criticised McCain for not challenging the supporter's anti-Arab racism: in a blog post Campbell Brown praised McCain for "setting the record straight", but asked: "So what if Obama was Arab or Muslim? So what if John McCain was Arab or Muslim?... Whenever this gets raised, the implication is that there is something wrong with being an Arab-American or a Muslim". Academic Juan Cole stated: "McCain should have said, 'there would be nothing wrong with being an Arab, but Obama is not.' The way he put it strongly implied that he had a low opinion of Arabs". Afghan-American novelist Khaled Hosseini wrote that "simply calling Obama 'a decent person' is not enough", whilst US-resident Jordanian journalist Salameh Nematt said: "Instead of rejecting the notion that being an Arab is a pejorative term, the Arizona senator, by denying that Obama is an Arab, succeeded in insulting millions of Arabs and Arab-Americans". Lebanese-American political scientist As'ad AbuKhalil suggested that McCain "clearly implied that an Arab can't be a decent family man".

Down the stretch, McCain was outspent by Obama by a four-to-one margin.

=== Results ===
The election took place on November 4, and Barack Obama was projected the winner at about 11:00 pm Eastern Standard Time (EST). McCain delivered his concession speech at the Arizona Biltmore Hotel in Phoenix, Arizona, at about 11:20 pm EST. In the end, McCain won 173 electoral college votes to Obama's 365, reflecting McCain's failure to win the key battleground states of Florida, Ohio, and Pennsylvania, and the Democratic Party's upset victories in traditional Republican strongholds such as Virginia, North Carolina, and Indiana. McCain gained 46 percent of the nationwide popular vote, compared to Obama's 53 percent.

McCain's concession speech that night congratulated Obama on his victory and said, "We have come to an end of a long journey. The American people have spoken, and they have spoken clearly." He said:

This is an historic election, and I recognize the special significance it has for African-Americans and for the special pride that must be theirs tonight. I've always believed that America offers opportunities to all who have the industry and will to seize it. Senator Obama believes that, too. But we both recognize that, though we have come a long way from the old injustices that once stained our nation's reputation and denied some Americans the full blessings of American citizenship, the memory of them still had the power to wound. A century ago, President Theodore Roosevelt's invitation of Booker T. Washington to dine at the White House was taken as an outrage in many quarters. America today is a world away from the cruel and frightful bigotry of that time. There is no better evidence of this than the election of an African-American to the presidency of the United States.

McCain added: "Whatever our differences, we are fellow Americans. And please believe me when I say, no association has ever meant more to me than that." Commentators praised the speech, using terms such as "gracious and eloquent". McCain and his staff did not permit Palin to deliver her prepared speech, as there was no formal tradition of running mates making speeches on election night, and this proved an enduring source of bitterness to Palin.

=== Aftermath ===
In the wake of the election results, anonymous members of McCain's staff reportedly criticized Palin and her campaign staff's conduct of the campaign. Some of the criticisms were later attributed erroneously to staff at a non-existent think-tank as part of the Martin Eisenstadt hoax.

A month later, McCain demurred from putting too much stress on the effect the 2008 financial crisis had had on his chance to win the presidency: "That would sound like I am detracting from President-elect Obama's campaign. I don't want to do that . . . Nobody likes a sore loser." McCain said, "I spent a period of time feeling sorry for myself. It's wonderful. It's one of the most enjoyable experiences that you can have. But the point is: You've got to move on . . . I'm still a senator from the state of Arizona. I still have the privilege and honor of serving this country, which I've done all my life, and it's a great honor to do so."

In campaign post-mortems, top McCain staffers conceded that the Palin rollout to the national media had not gone well. But they generally defended the decision to pick Palin, because the other "game changing" choice of Joe Lieberman would have been politically unacceptable to conservative Republicans at the convention and because there were not many good alternatives available. Regarding McCain having barred using the Jeremiah Wright controversy in ads against Obama, McCain's pollsters said it was the right decision both on the merits and on the politics. McCain himself also defended both the Palin pick and the decision not to attack on the Wright controversy. The staffers agreed that McCain's remark that the "fundamentals of our economy are strong" at the beginning of the financial crisis had been a blunder, and said that the subsequent suspension of the campaign was an attempt to recover from the remark but had led to charges that McCain was erratic.

Overall, a deputy campaign manager said, "We could spend [a long time] talking about the strategy of the McCain campaign because we had so many of them." When the campaign's chief pollster was asked if they could have pulled out the election if they had only had some more time, he responded "No—we lost. We were happy it was over."

A year after the election, there was still ongoing feuding between the McCain and Palin camps over the conduct of the campaign, culminating with the November 2009 publication of Palin's memoir Going Rogue: An American Life. Palin criticized McCain campaign manager Steve Schmidt heavily, and contended that the McCain campaign had mismanaged her media appearances. Schmidt replied that Palin's telling was "all fiction", and prior McCain strategist John Weaver denounced Palin for "petty and pathetic" attempts to get even. McCain himself simply said that he had read the book, was still very good friends with Palin, and stated: "Look, I'm just moving on. I'm just moving on, and I've got too many other things to worry about except to say that I'm proud of my campaign." McCain told his staff repeatedly, "Don't look back in anger."

Several months before his death in August 2018, McCain published his memoir The Restless Wave: Good Times, Just Causes, Great Fights and Other Appreciations in which he remarked that he regretted choosing Palin as his running mate and wished that he instead picked Joe Lieberman. In commenting on his campaign staff's advice to not choose Lieberman, McCain wrote that "it was sound advice that I could reason for myself, but my gut told me to ignore it and I wish I had."

== Campaign opinion and projections ==
=== Opinion polling ===
An average of fifteen national polls taken between October 29 and November 3 showed an average 7.6% lead for McCain's opponent Barack Obama before election day. The poll average was off by 0.3%, with Obama instead gaining only 7.3% more of the popular vote than McCain. The poll average projected McCain would receive 44.5% of the popular vote. He bested this by 1.1%, actually garnering 45.6% of the popular vote.

Poll numbers varied greatly the day before the election and through the election season. This can be attributed to varying polling methods, demographics, and sample sizes between pollsters, amongst other things. Final polls ranged from an 11% advantage for Obama to only a 2% advantage. The most accurate final poll numbers were from Fox News, Ipsos/McClatchy, and CNN/Opinion Research which predicted a 7% advantage for Obama. Rasmussen Reports and Pew Research predicted a 6% advantage.

During the election season, McCain's highest support among an average of national polls was 2.9% on September 8, four days after the end of the 2008 Republican National Convention. Amongst individual polls, before the primary season McCain's highest support was recorded in a Fox News poll conducted between December 5 and December 6 showing a 19% lead. After the primaries, McCain's highest support was recorded in a USA Today/Gallup poll conducted between September 5 and September 7 showing a 10% lead.

Gallup conducted weekly polls of registered voters to measure support among the candidates by political ideology. The last poll conducted before election day, taken between October 27 and November 2, showed 32% of pure Independents supporting McCain, leading Obama's 24% support. McCain's Independent support peaked at 38% the week of September 15–21.

=== Electoral College projections ===
Statewide opinion polling for the 2008 United States presidential election up to November 3, 2008.

Leading up to the day before the general election, the RealClearPolitics electoral map, an average of statewide opinion polls, projected 132 electoral votes for McCain/Palin and an electoral majority of 278 votes for opponents Obama/Biden. 128 electoral votes were considered toss ups. With toss up votes attributed to poll leaders, McCain/Palin were projected to receive 200 electoral votes, trailing 338 votes for Obama/Biden.

McCain received 173 electoral votes, trailing Obama's 365. By November 19, 2008, all states had decided their electoral votes. The last state to decide was Missouri, where McCain held a lead of less than 0.1% of the popular vote. With the election already decided, the close results in Missouri were not contested, and Missouri was called for McCain.

McCain ultimately underperformed his projected electoral vote count. Toss-ups such as North Carolina, Indiana, and Nebraska's 2nd congressional district went for Obama. Opinion poll averages prior to the election projected these votes for McCain.

=== Favorability ===
An average of four national polls measuring favorable/unfavorable opinions taken between October 31 and November 2 showed an average 52.3% favorable opinion and 41.5% unfavorable opinion of McCain before election day. Favorable and unfavorable opinions of McCain varied during the election season, but his favorable opinion remained higher than his unfavorable opinion throughout the duration of the election season according to poll averages. McCain's highest ratings was 57.6% favorable and 35.2% unfavorable on July 13.

=== World opinion ===
Opinions of the 2008 U.S. presidential election and the candidates varied around the world. Those who expressed an opinion favored McCain's opponent. According to Gallup polls conducted worldwide from May to October 2008, 7% of the people in the 73 countries polled supported McCain, compared to 24% who supported Obama. Most (about 70% of those polled) either had no opinion or offered no opinion at all.

== Media coverage ==
An October 29, 2007, study by the Project for Excellence in Journalism and the Joan Shorenstein Center on the Press, Politics and Public Policy found that through the first five months of 2007, McCain had received the most unfavorable media coverage of any of the major 2008 presidential candidates, with 12 percent of the stories having a favorable tone towards him, 48 percent having an unfavorable tone, and with the balance neutral. In terms of amount of coverage, McCain was the subject of 7 percent of all stories, second-most among Republicans and fourth-most overall. McCain's negative coverage mostly included pessimistic "horse race" stories that focused on his campaign's slippage in national polls and fundraising difficulty; it also included his support for the then-unpopular Iraq troop surge. McCain's campaign went through its near-total collapse soon after the window of this study; the press subsequently focused on a "McCain is dead" story line through the summer, which it was slow to change away from.

By the time the 2008 primary season began, McCain's media coverage had shifted and he was now viewed as a "comeback" story. In addition, McCain returned to his long-standing practice of granting almost unlimited media access to him on this bus; this as well as the notion that he engages in "straight talk" free of political calculation gave him a positive personal sentiment in the press. Reflecting this feeling, MSNBC's Joe Scarborough joked of the media, "I think every last one of them would move to Massachusetts and marry John McCain if they could." Measurements by the University of Navarra indicated that throughout January 2008, McCain's global media attention surged from being a distant third among Republican candidates to being the equal of Romney and Huckabee.

In July 2008, the McCain campaign shifted to a much more restrictive attitude toward the press, virtually ending the former time for open-ended questions. McCain's press conferences became infrequent and, as one reporter stated, "He no longer ventures to the press section of his campaign plane to talk to reporters."

== Music use ==
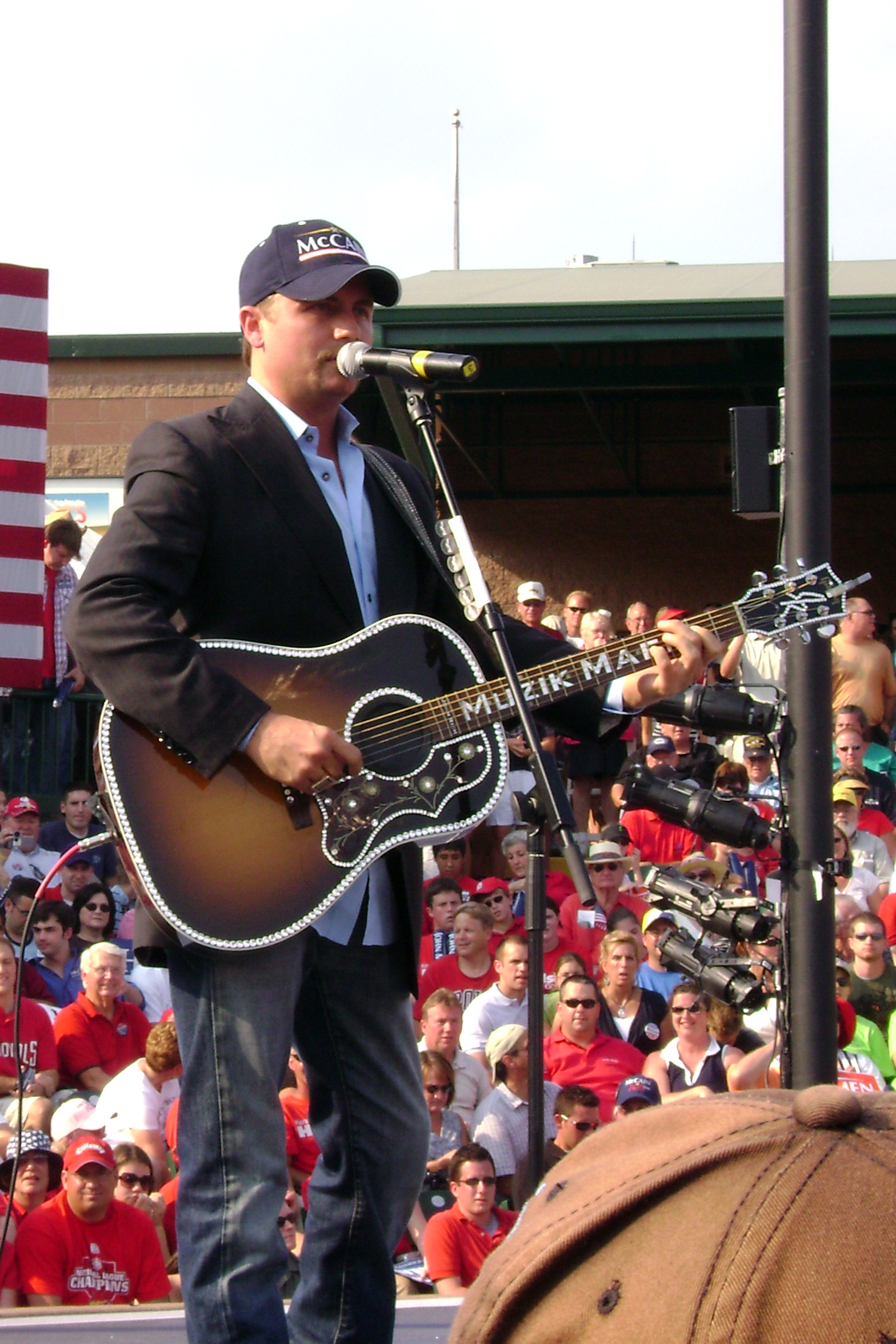
John Rich performing his song "Raisin' McCain" at a campaign rally in O'Fallon, Missouri, August 31, 2008

The campaign was criticized and in one case a lawsuit filed for its use of music during campaign events and in advertising. Pioneering rock-n-roll artist Chuck Berry publicly snubbed McCain's use of his song "Johnny B. Goode" on the campaign, which had been selected by McCain "mainly because it has the chorus "Go Johnny Go Go Go" in it". When Berry publicly stated his support for Obama in June, the McCain campaign began using ABBA's "Take a Chance on Me" instead. In August 2008, singer Jackson Browne filed suit against the McCain Campaign, the Republican National Committee and the Ohio Republican Party for use of "Running on Empty" in a commercial stating that the use violates the Lanham Act by implying an endorsement by Browne. In October, the Foo Fighters asked the campaign to stop using "My Hero", stating that this use of the song "tarnished" the original intent. The campaign also drew criticism from Heart for its use of "Barracuda" to accompany Sarah Palin's appearance at the Republican National Convention, with the group saying "Sarah Palin's views and values in no way represent us as American women." Members of Van Halen objected to use of "Right Now", although former lead singer and co-writer of the song Sammy Hagar said he had no problem with the use: "Whether it was McCain who used the song or if Obama had chosen to use the song, with the current political climate, the lyrics still have the same meaning."

A McCain–Palin spokesperson responded saying that the campaign had properly licensed these songs giving them to permission to play them. The music has reportedly been used under blanket licensing, which does not require the artists' permission but still follows proper legal channels and includes royalty payments.

McCain had better success in country music, where award-winning and popular songwriter John Rich wrote the campaign song "Raisin' McCain" in August 2008. Rich had a penchant for producing songs with political overtones, although The New York Times called this a "far less imaginative slice of propaganda" than some of his other efforts. He performed it at the closing ceremony of the Republican National Convention and at campaign rallies.

In February 2009, a judge rejected motions made by the legal team for McCain and the Republican National Committee to dismiss the Browne lawsuit which charged possible copyright infringement, false endorsement and violation of Browne's right of publicity. The case was settled out of court for an undisclosed sum in July 2009, with the McCain campaign, the Ohio Republican Party, and the Republican National Committee issuing a joint apology for using the song. Their statement declared that McCain himself had been unaware of the use and did not condone it.

== Fundraising and finances ==
After first-quarter fundraising totals were released in early April, totals showed McCain's $13.6 million lagging behind rivals in the race. He spent more than $8 million in campaign funds during the first quarter, leaving him with $5.2 million in the bank and $1.8 million in debts. McCain exceeded 51,000 individual donors, more than rivals Giuliani, with 28,356, and Romney, with 36,538. However, McCain was worried at the high "burn rate" of money used during the first quarter and retooled his entire financial operations after the reports came back.

McCain's second-quarter fundraising totals were worse, with intake falling to $11.2 million and expenses continuing such that only $2 million cash was on hand. McCain's aides said the campaign was considering taking public matching funds

As of September 30, 2007, McCain had raised $32,124,785 for his campaign for presidency. Private donors had given $30,183,761 toward his campaign, PACs have given $458,307, and $1,482,717 had come from other sources. 70% of the PAC contributions have come from business groups, 1% from labor groups, and the final 29% from ideological organizations. So far 95.6% of his finances have been disclosed, while 4.4% had not.

McCain was the first candidate to accept financing from the presidential election campaign fund checkoff.

During the campaign's summer 2007 financial woes, it used a list of donors as collateral in order to get approval on a bank loan. This raised the question of whether the campaign's privacy policy was violated by such a use. A McCain spokesperson said it did not, since all of the campaign's assets were pledged as collateral at the time, not just the donor list.

By December 2007, McCain was using thirty-two lobbyists as fundraisers, more than any other candidate.

Although McCain accepted public financing for the general election campaign, and the restrictions that go with it, his opponent did not, and McCain criticized Obama for becoming the first major party candidate in history to opt out of public financing.

The McCain campaign received $7 million in contributions in a single day after announcing Palin as the presumptive vice presidential nominee.

Nevertheless, down the stretch run of the general election campaign, McCain was outspent by Obama by a four-to-one margin. In the end, from September 1 to the end of the campaign, McCain spent directly the $84 million allotted to him by the public financing rules, while Obama, having opted out of that system, spent $315 million directly during the same period.

== Endorsements ==
McCain gained the endorsements of many high profile Republican figures and organizations, including then incumbent president George W. Bush, Vice President Dick Cheney, former president George H. W. Bush, former First Lady Nancy Reagan, and the National Rifle Association of America.

An endorsement by Texas pastor John Hagee stirred controversy due to past remarks, which some alleged to be anti-Catholic and anti-Jewish. McCain initially sought and accepted Hagee's endorsement, but on April 20, 2008, he described accepting the endorsement as a mistake. He formally rejected the endorsement on May 22, 2008, following news reports of a sermon Hagee gave in the 1990s alleging that Adolf Hitler driving the Jewish people from Europe was "God's will" as it was part of a divine plan to gather Jews in the Holy Land. McCain condemned Hagee's sermon as "crazy and unacceptable".

McCain also received the support of Independent Democrat Joe Lieberman, who said, "I happen to think (McCain) is the best of all candidates to unite our country across political lines so we can begin to solve some of the problems people have."

== Transition planning ==
A presidential transition was contingently planned from Bush to McCain in accordance to occur in the event McCain was elected president. It would have been a "friendly takeover", in which the outgoing president and the incoming president are of the same political party. Since McCain lost the 2008 election to Democratic presidential nominee Barack Obama, this transition never went into effect.

Very low-key transition planning efforts began even before the Republican National Convention. Early on, six people from McCain's presidential campaign staff were handling transition concerns. These were William L. Ball, Rick Davis, Russ Gerson, John Lehman, Trevor Potter, and William Timmons.

The Bush administration began working with both the teams of McCain and Barack Obama regarding their potential transitions as early as the summer of 2008. In the summer of 2008, representatives of the McCain and Obama campaigns had a joint meeting with officials from the United States Department of Justice to discuss transition resources.

In the first half of September, McCain officially appointed William Timmons as his transition chief. Timmons was a former senior adviser to Vice President George H. W. Bush in 1988, an advisor to Senator Bob Dole in 1996, the founder and chairman emeritus of lobbying firm Timmons and Company, and a former lobbyist for Freddie Mac. He had been involved in the presidential transitions of Ronald Reagan and George W. Bush. Leading the transition planning effort alongside Timmons was John Lehman. Also involved in leading the effort was William L. Ball.

McCain's transition planners worked out of his campaign headquarters in Arlington, Virginia.

By late October, both the Obama and McCain camps had requested that the Bush administration quickly grant security clearances to key members of their transition teams.

McCain's transition team was much smaller, and had a less formal structure, than Obama's. By late October, McCain's transition efforts were far behind those of Obama. However, Obama's transition efforts were seen as being well ahead of any past transition effort. Amid his campaign's downturn at the time, McCain had ordered his transition team to limit their activities. McCain took the opportunity to criticize Obama for being presumptuous with his heavier transition planning, declaring, "Senator Obama is measuring the drapes." However, there was criticism that McCain was doing too little in regards to his transition planning.

Lehman, as part of the 9/11 Commission, had, in the past, expressed strong concerns over the national security threat that slow transitions can be. However, McCain was concerned about being too quick to prepare. In late October 2008, The New York Times reported that, "many Republicans who would normally be consulted about plans and personnel said they had detected little preparation".

McCain's transition team focused largely on the federal budget and on creating a list of potential administration personnel. Many of the volunteers staffing the McCain campaign were not professional experts in personnel searches, but rather professionals that were more of policy experts. Many were individuals that had longtime acquaintance with McCain.

== See also ==
- 2008 Republican Party presidential primaries
- 2008 Republican Party vice presidential candidate selection
- 2008 Republican National Convention
- 2008 United States presidential election
- Barack Obama 2008 presidential campaign
- 72 Things Younger Than John McCain
- Iowa Electronic Market 2008 US Presidential Election Markets graphs

== Bibliography ==
- Balz, Dan; Johnson, Haynes (2009). The Battle for America, 2008: The Story of an Extraordinary Election. New York: Viking Penguin. ISBN 978-0-670-02111-6.
- Heilemann, John; Halperin, Mark (2010). Game Change: Obama and the Clintons, McCain and Palin, and the Race of a Lifetime. New York: HarperCollins. ISBN 978-0-06-173363-5.
- Vassallo, Salvatore (2009). Jones, Erik (ed.). The 2008 Presidential Elections: A Story in Four Acts. Palgrave Macmillan. ISBN 978-0-230-61938-8.
- Kornblut, Anne E. (2009). Notes from the Cracked Ceiling: Hillary Clinton, Sarah Palin, and What It Will Take for a Woman to Win. Crown Books. ISBN 978-0-307-46425-5.
- Palin, Sarah (2009). Going Rogue: An American Life. HarperCollins and Zondervan. ISBN 978-0-06-193989-1.
- Plouffe, David (2009). The Audacity to Win: The Inside Story and Lessons of Barack Obama's Historic Victory. Viking Adult. ISBN 978-0-670-02133-8.
- Thomas, Evan (2009). "A Long Time Coming": The Inspiring, Combative 2008 Campaign and the Historic Election of Barack Obama. New York: PublicAffairs. ISBN 978-1-58648-607-5.
- Todd, Chuck; Gawiser, Sheldon (2009). How Barack Obama Won: A State-by-State Guide to the Historic 2008 Presidential Election. Vintage Press. ISBN 978-0-307-47366-0.
