= George E. Allen Jr. =

American politician (1914–1990)

Member of the Virginia House of Delegates from the 33rd district
- In office January 13, 1954 – January 13, 1982
- Preceded by: Albert O. Boschen
- Succeeded by: None (seat abolished)

Personal details
- Born: George Edward Allen Jr. April 14, 1914 Victoria, Virginia, U.S.
- Died: February 21, 1990 (aged 75) Richmond, Virginia, U.S.
- Resting place: Hollywood Cemetery
- Party: Democratic
- Parent: George E. Allen Sr. (father)
- Education: Virginia Tech (BA); University of Richmond (LLB)
- Occupation: Lawyer; politician

George Edward Allen Jr. (April 14, 1914 – February 21, 1990) was a Virginia attorney who, with his father and two brothers, founded the law firm Allen, Allen, Allen & Allen.

== Early life and education ==
Allen was born in Lunenburg County, Virginia to George E. Allen, Sr. (1885–1972) and Susie Lee Jones Allen (1892–1918). After attending Virginia Polytechnic Institute, Allen graduated from the T.C. Williams School of Law, University of Richmond and began practicing law in 1936.

== Career ==
Active in politics, Allen served as President of the Young Democratic Clubs of Virginia before he ran for a seat in the Virginia General Assembly's House of Delegates in 1954. He served in the House of Delegates for 28 years until 1982. From 1974 to 1982, Allen was Chairman of the House Courts of Justice Committee.

During his years in the state legislatures, George Allen Jr. championed the rights of persons injured through the negligence of others and voted for laws to protect their interests. Major pieces of legislation he supported include the repeal of a Virginia law which limited monetary recovery in wrongful death cases. Prior to repeal, a judge or jury could not award damages exceeding $25,000 in a wrongful death case regardless of the number of dependents the deceased person had, or how large his earned income was. Allen also advocated the repeal of a longstanding Virginia law which prohibited an injured guest passenger from making a monetary recovery from his negligent host driver unless the passenger could prove gross as opposed to simple negligence or willful and wanton disregard on the operator's part.

Allen's bar association activities included service as the Vice-President of the Virginia Trial Lawyers' Association from 1962–1963 and terms as Secretary (1956–1957) and Governor (1966–68) of the American Trial Lawyers Association. He served as trustee of the Law Science Academy and Foundation and was the recipient of the Southern Trial Lawyers Association's "War Horse Award" which recognizes attorneys who have made extraordinary contributions to the trial bar over a period of thirty years or more.
