= George E. Allen Sr. =

American politician (1885–1972)

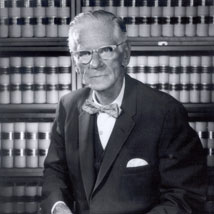
- Allen in 1966

Member of the Virginia Senate from the 28th district
- In office January 12, 1916 – January 14, 1920
- Preceded by: Robert K. Brock
- Succeeded by: Louis S. Epes

Personal details
- Born: George Edward Allen; March 31, 1885 Lunenburg, Virginia, U.S.
- Died: July 21, 1972 (aged 87) Richmond, Virginia, U.S.
- Party: Democratic
- Spouse(s): Susie Lee Jones; Mary Bridgeforth
- Children: George E. Allen Jr. Ashby B. Allen; Wilbur C. Allen; Anna Florence Allen
- Education: Virginia Polytechnic Institute; University of Virginia

George Edward Allen Sr. (March 31, 1885 – July 21, 1972) was a Virginia state senator from 1916 to 1920 and a trial attorney who, with his three sons, founded the law firm of Allen, Allen, Allen & Allen. He was born in Lunenburg County, Virginia, and studied law at The University of Virginia. In 1910 he started practicing law in Victoria, Virginia, and in 1914 became the youngest mayor in the town's history. After having practiced law for more than twenty years in southside Virginia and having served as a state senator, he moved both his family and his law practice to the state capital of Richmond during the depression.

== Legal career ==
Allen was a general practitioner who represented a wide range of clients from a Black Muslim prisoner to depositors in a failed country bank. His legal interests were broad, and as a result over his long career he handled cases involving a variety of issues including witchcraft, alienation of affection, obscenity, as well as election disputes and contested utility rates.

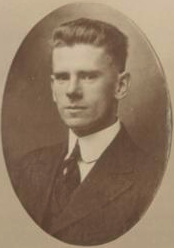
Allen as a state senator during the 1916 General Assembly

In the early 1950s, when his sons decided to devote their law practice exclusively to personal injury law, Allen declined to restrict his own practice. It was during this period that he undertook a civil rights case representing Fred Wallace, an African American law student at Harvard University who had been charged in Prince Edward County, Virginia, where he had been doing civil rights work, with multiple misdemeanors and a felony. Although Allen approached white lawyers for assistance in Wallace's defense, none would associate themselves in the case. After failing in his attempt to remove the case to federal court and after exhausting his appeals to the Court of Appeals for the Fourth Circuit and the United States Supreme Court, Allen reached an agreement with the prosecutor whereby the felony and some of the misdemeanors were dismissed and the remaining misdemeanors concluded through the payment of small fines. Thereafter, Mr. Wallace graduated from law school and obtained his license to practice law in New York State. In recognition of his work in the Wallace case, The American College of Trial Lawyers gave Allen its first Award for Courageous Advocacy.

In 1971, Allen undertook the appeal of a North Carolina homeowner who had brought a Federal Tort Claims Act action against the United States for property damage to his house allegedly caused by the sonic boom of military aircraft carrying out a training mission over North Carolina. He argued the case before the United States Supreme Court just months before his death at age 87.

Allen served as president of the Richmond Bar Association in 1959 and was a founding member and president of the Virginia Trial Lawyers Association (1961). He was also elected a fellow of the American College of Trial Lawyers and a fellow of the International Academy of Trial Lawyers.
