= 72 Things Younger Than John McCain =

2008 American book

- Author: Joe Quint
- Subject: John McCain
- Publisher: Simon & Schuster
- Publication date: August 2008
- Publication place: United States
- Pages: 128
- ISBN: 978-1-4391-0227-5

72 Things Younger Than John McCain is a book by American blogger Joe Quint. The book lists items from popular culture that were invented after John McCain's birth in 1936, including nachos, Social Security, chocolate chip cookies, duct tape and ZIP codes. 72 Things Younger Than John McCain also includes people who are younger than McCain, even though the reader might believe them to be older. Quint used the book to show how the age of the candidate was relevant compared to his competitor.
