= Vicki Iseman =

American lobbyist

- Born: 1967 (age 58–59); Homer City, Pennsylvania
- Education: Bachelor's degree in Elementary education (IUP)
- Occupations: Lobbyist (Iseman & Szelinga)

Vicki L. Iseman (born 1967) is an American lobbyist working for the firm Iseman & Szelinga. As a lobbyist for the firm Alcalde & Fay she gained national media attention in February 2008, and again in May 2022, due to her involvement in the John McCain lobbyist controversy.

== Personal ==
A native of Indiana, Pennsylvania, Vicki Iseman graduated in 1985 from the Homer-Center High School, where she was a cheerleader and a member of the student council. She went on to attend the Indiana University of Pennsylvania, graduating with a bachelor's degree in Elementary Education in 1990. In 2006, she delivered the commencement address at her old high school, and would lobby for both that school and her alma mater during her career. Her family still lives in Indiana County, where she is recalled as a "hometown girl who made good".

== Career ==
Within months of graduation, Iseman joined a friend in Washington, D.C., and initially got a job as a receptionist at Alcalde & Fay. After a few months, she approached the president of Alcalde & Fay and said "I’m a college graduate and I’d like you to consider me for a secretarial or an administrative position." The president agreed to a three-month trial and within a year she became his special assistant.

From this position, Iseman learned about lobbying from the firm's president, and soon became a lobbyist in her own right. Eight years later, she became the youngest partner in the history of Alcalde & Fay.

=== Clients ===
Her clients have most notably been broadcasters who were interested in the regulation of cable television. Her most prominent broadcast clients from 1998 through 2006 have included PAX Network (and its corporate parent, Paxson Communications), CanWest Global Communications, Religious Voices in Broadcasting, ION Media Networks, Click Radio, i2 Telecom International, Sinclair Broadcast Group, Total Living Network, Jovan Broadcasting, Saga Communications, Capstar Broadcasting Partners, Telemundo, and the Hispanic Broadcasting Corporation (purchased in 2003 by Univision Communications, Inc. and renamed Univision Radio). She is also known for her work for the telecommunications industry, including her lobbying for BearingPoint and the Computer Sciences Corporation.

Some of her other prominent clients have been PricewaterhouseCoopers, Carnival Cruise Lines (and the family trust of owner Micky Arison), AstraZeneca, CACI, FCCLA, American Medical Facilities Management, Marin County and Tulare County, California, Hillsborough County, Florida, and the cities of Miami, Florida, and Palm Springs, California. She also lobbied for some charitable personal causes, including her aforementioned efforts for her former high school and university.

=== Lobbying activities ===
On behalf of these clients, she lobbied both the House Commerce Committee and the Senate Commerce Committee. In the course of hearings on communications bills in 1992 and 1996 which eventually led to the Telecommunications Act of 1996, she argued that cable TV should have to carry broadcast television. She also represented her clients' interests with respect to the upcoming conversion to digital television; satellite reception; and telecommunications ownership provisions.

Her other activities as a lobbyist included public organizing on behalf of clients interested in the allocation of Federal Highway Administration trust funds, assisting clients interested in securing government contracts and government appropriations, and participating in political fundraising.

In February 2015, Politico reported that based on a press release, Iseman and fellow Acalde & Fay attorney Tatanya Szeliga formed Iseman & Szelinga, a new "spinoff" of Acalde & Fay focusing on government affairs and public relations, intending to maintain a "strategic alliance" with the previous firm.

== Lawsuit against The New York Times ==
In December 2008, Iseman filed a US$27 million defamation lawsuit against The New York Times, alleging that the paper, in the course of describing circumstances of her lobbying activity, had falsely implied an illicit romantic relationship between her and Senator John McCain. The Times said they "fully stood behind the article" and the story was "true and accurate".

The suit was subsequently settled without payment in February 2009. As part of the settlement, Ms. Iseman accepted the Times’ explanation, which appeared in a "Note to Readers" published in the newspaper. The "Note to Readers" said: "The article did not state, and The Times did not intend to conclude, that Ms. Iseman had engaged in a romantic affair with Senator McCain or an unethical relationship on behalf of her clients in breach of the public trust."

The article that prompted the lawsuit was published on February 21, 2008. McCain's presidential campaign called the article "a hit-and-run smear campaign" and "gutter politics."

Steve Schmidt, a senior strategist for Senator John McCain's 2008 presidential campaign, said on May 8, 2022, that Senator McCain had confessed to him in 2008 that he was actually having an affair. This confession occurred after he and the campaign had already disputed the claims published in The New York Times. "Ultimately, John McCain's lie became mine," Schmidt said. On May 9, 2022, The Times stated that Schmidt lied about McCain's romantic involvement with the female lobbyist in order to discredit The Times article and protect his client's reputation, but Schmidt and lawyers dispute this claim and The Times' timeline of events.
