= Jennifer Horn =

American politician (born 1964)

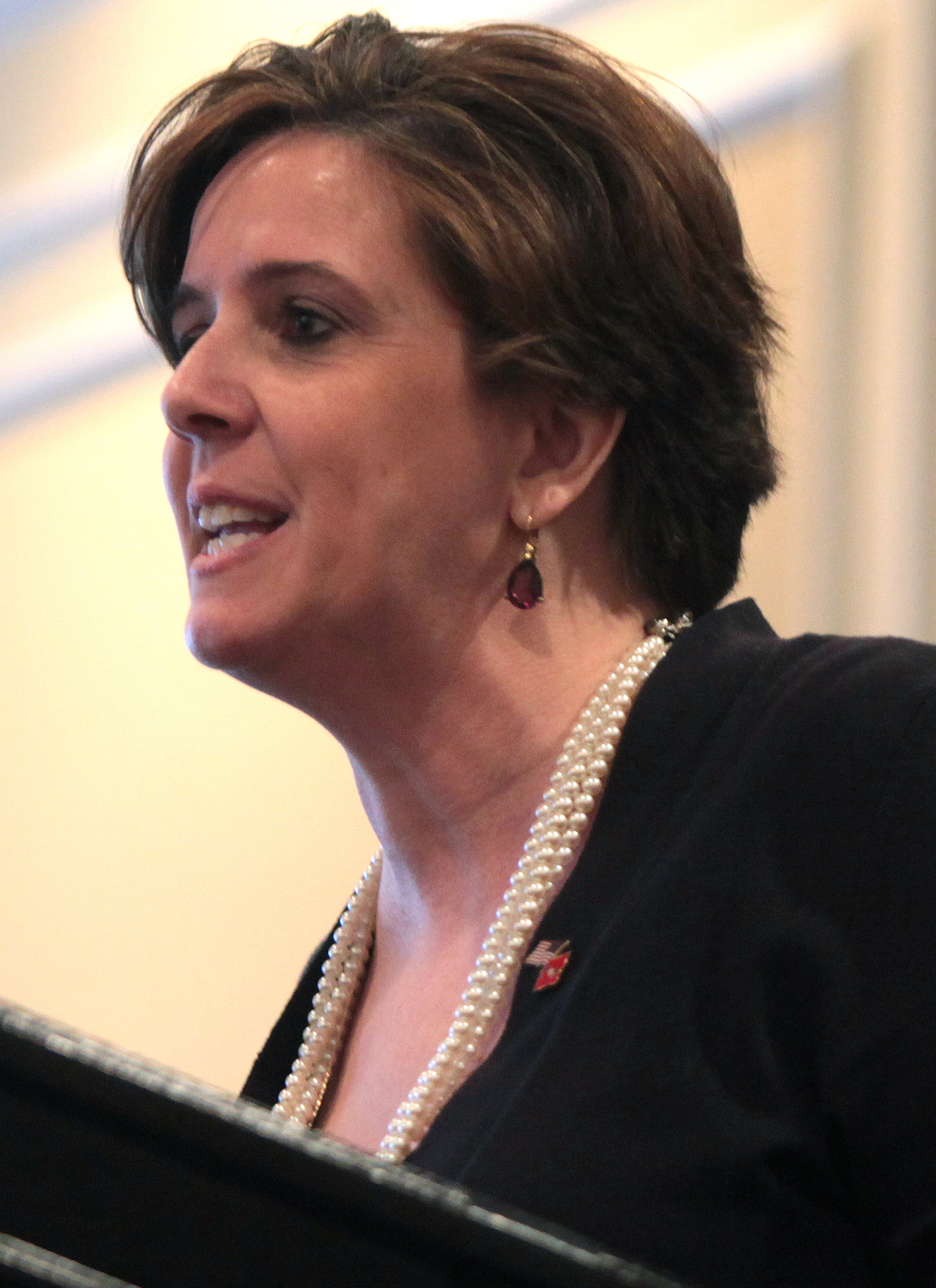

Chair of the New Hampshire Republican State Committee
- In office January 26, 2013 – January 28, 2017
- Preceded by: Wayne MacDonald
- Succeeded by: Jeanie Forrester

Personal details
- Born: June 22, 1964 (age 62) Albany, New York, U.S.
- Party: Republican (before 2020); Independent (2020–present)
- Spouse: William Horn
- Children: 5
- Education: College of Saint Rose

Jennifer Mary Horn (born June 22, 1964) is an American politician. She was a two-time challenger for New Hampshire's 2nd congressional district. She won the Republican nomination in 2008 and became the first woman nominated by the Republican Party in the state. She lost to Paul Hodes in the general election. In 2010, she ran again and lost to Charles Bass in the Republican primary. She then served as chair of the New Hampshire Republican State Committee and co-founded The Lincoln Project.

== Early life and education ==
Horn was born on June 22, 1964, in Albany, New York. She attended the College of Saint Rose from 1982 to 1986.

== Career ==
Horn worked as a liaison between Blue Cross-Blue Shield and physicians from 1986 to 1990, worked with her husband at his management-consulting firm from 1990 to 1997, was a print journalist at The Telegraph of Nashua from 2002 to 2008, and a radio talk-show host from 2006 to 2008.

=== Political involvement ===
==== 2008 congressional campaign ====
In the 2008 campaign for representative for the second congressional district of New Hampshire, Horn ran against incumbent Paul Hodes. Horn defeated four other primary opponents in her first political race. The campaign included a televised debate.

==== 2010 congressional primary ====
In 2010, Horn ran for the Republican nomination for District Two's House seat against former U.S. Representative Charlie Bass. Bass defeated Horn by 8 points and narrowly won the general election.

==== Political activism ====
In 2011, Horn founded the conservative non-profit organization We the People: A First in the Nation Freedom Forum, which she terminated following her election as Chairman of the NH GOP. Its founding principle was the bolstering of freedom via the promotion of personal responsibility and limited government. The organization sponsored town hall type meetings through New Hampshire in the lead-up to the state's first-in-the-nation primary. Rick Santorum spoke at one of the organization's events on April 30, 2011.

Horn chaired the New Hampshire Republican State Committee's platform committee in 2012.

==== Chair of the New Hampshire Republican Party ====
Horn won the state GOP chairmanship on January 26, 2013, defeating Andrew Hemingway in an election to replace the outgoing chairman, Wayne MacDonald. She had the backing of U.S. Senator Kelly Ayotte and outgoing congressmen Frank Guinta and Charlie Bass, along with 40 other elected officials. In the closing weeks of the election, she faced scrutiny for a $92,000 IRS lien and another $230,000 in campaign debt. The debt was in the form of a loan that Horn had made to the campaign. Thus, it was money due to Horn personally from the campaign. Her IRS debt was subsequently paid in full and the lien removed. Both Horn and her opponent Hemingway had characterized the release of the information by fellow Republican Joe Barton as a "personal attack" that had no place in the election.

In 2014, she announced that she would run for a second term, and won.

As New Hampshire GOP chair, she has attacked the state Democratic Party for what she has termed "drive-thru" voting. Horn contends that voting by out-of-state Democratic volunteers, including the niece of Vice President Joseph Biden, in New Hampshire elections is illegal and constitutes voter fraud. She accused Democratic state Senator Martha Fuller Clark of midwifing a "sanctuary of voter fraud" by allowing four out-of-state campaign volunteers to use her address for their voter registrations.

Horn also announced she supported Republican National Committee Reince Priebus's proposed boycott of CNN and NBC, threatening to deny them Republican participation in the 2016 presidential debates, if the two networks went ahead with their proposed projects featuring Hillary Clinton.

==== Trump presidency ====
After Donald Trump took office as president, Horn was one of his most prominent Republican critics. Along with several other prominent Republican strategists, she co-founded the Lincoln Project, which aimed to defeat Trump and his supporters in Congress.

On December 17, 2020, she announced that she was leaving the Republican Party. On February 5, 2021, she announced that she was resigning from the Lincoln Project, citing fellow co-founder John Weaver's history of sexual misconduct against young men. In response, the Lincoln Project said Horn had 48 hours earlier requested "an immediate 'signing bonus' payment of $250,000 and a $40,000-per-month consulting contract," and that in December she "demanded a board seat on the Lincoln Project, a television show, a podcast hosting assignment and a staff to manage these endeavors. These demands were unanimously rejected by the management committee and board."

== Personal life ==
Horn resides in Nashua, New Hampshire, with her husband William Horn and five children.

Party political offices
Preceded by Wayne MacDonald	Chair of the New Hampshire Republican Party; 2013–2017	Succeeded by Jeanie Forrester
