= Mike Madrid =

American political strategist

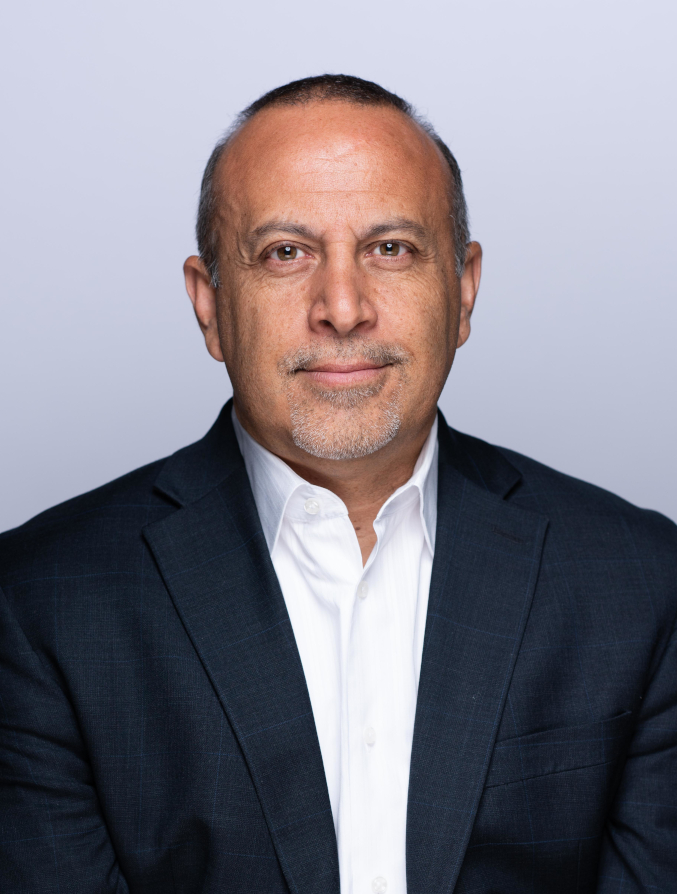
- Education: Moorpark College; Georgetown University (B.A.)
- Political party: Republican
- Children: 3

Mike Madrid is an American political strategist, campaign manager, and political commentator. A member of the Republican Party, he was press secretary for former Republican leader of the California Assembly Rod Pacheco, as well as the political director for the California Republican Party. He has provided commentary to various publications with regards to changing trends, voting behaviors, and communication strategies geared towards the Latino vote.

Madrid was a fellow for the Unruh Institute of Politics at the University of Southern California (USC), teaching as an adjunct lecturer on Race, Class, and Partisanship at the USC Center for the Political Future in 2019. He also served as a senior fellow and lectured at the School of Social Ecology at the University of California, Irvine. He was a co-founder of the Lincoln Project in 2019 before leaving the group in December 2020.

== Biography ==
=== Early life and education ===
Madrid grew up in Moorpark, California, born to Mexican American parents who moved to Moorpark in 1971. He initially attended Moorpark College, where he served as the student body president. His first experience with politics came after volunteering during the 1992 presidential election in California. California's then governor Pete Wilson appointed Madrid as the California Community College Board of Governors's student representative in the early 1990s. He would later transfer to Georgetown University's Walsh School of Foreign Service and graduate in 1997. His senior thesis was on Latino politics and the politicization of Latinos in the American Southwest.

=== Professional career ===
In 2001, he was named one of America's Most Influential Hispanics by Hispanic Business Magazine. He would go on to work with the California Republican Party, serving as the political director for the party. He would also serve as the press secretary for Rod Pacheco. He also served as the public affairs director for the League of California Cities, and coordinated lobbying efforts on various California propositions, including the campaign to defeat 2006 California Prop 90, advocating no and yes respectively on 2008 California Props 98 and 99, as well as the yes campaign for California Prop 22 in 2010. He was appointed to the board of directors of the American Association of Political Consultants.

Despite being a Republican, Madrid has done consulting work for candidates from the Democratic Party in addition to the Republican Party, notably including for former Los Angeles mayor and Democrat Antonio Villaraigosa during the 2018 California gubernatorial election.

Madrid was a fellow for the Unruh Institute of Politics at the University of Southern California and taught at the university as an adjunct lecturer on Race, Class, and Partisanship at the USC Center for the Political Future in 2019. He also co-directed the Los Angeles-USC Times poll. He later served a senior fellow and lectured at the School of Social Ecology at the University of California, Irvine. While at UC Irvine, he led the school's "Red County, Blue County, Orange County" project, which serves to analyze political trends in Orange County.

Madrid did not vote for any presidential candidate during the 2016 presidential election and began to criticize the Republican Party since the beginning of Donald Trump's 2016 campaign for its growing nationalistic tones. Inspired by this, he would go on to co-found the Lincoln Project in 2019. The organization is considered one of the most successful Super-PACs in American history, raising almost $100 million to campaign against Trump's failed 2020 re-election bid. He appeared with the other co-founders to deliver a speech at Cooper Union, the same venue used by Abraham Lincoln to give one of his most well-known speeches, during the 2020 campaign. He left the group in December 2020 due to disputes with the organization over money and power. This came under the backdrop of sexual misconduct allegations against Lincoln Project co-founder John Weaver.

In 2023, he was awarded the UnidosUS Capital Award. Madrid released his book on Latino voting trends, "The Latino Century: How America's Largest Minority Is Transforming Democracy", in June 2024. He is currently a principal at the political consultancy group Grassroots Lab, a firm he founded in 2008. He also publishes articles on California City News. He serves as senior political advisor with the New California Coalition. He had previously served as co-chair with the League of Minority Voters.

=== Personal life ===
In addition to his residence in California, Madrid has a second home in Puerto Vallarta, Mexico. He was married from 1998 to 2008. He has three children.
