= Steve Schmidt =

American political strategist (born 1970)

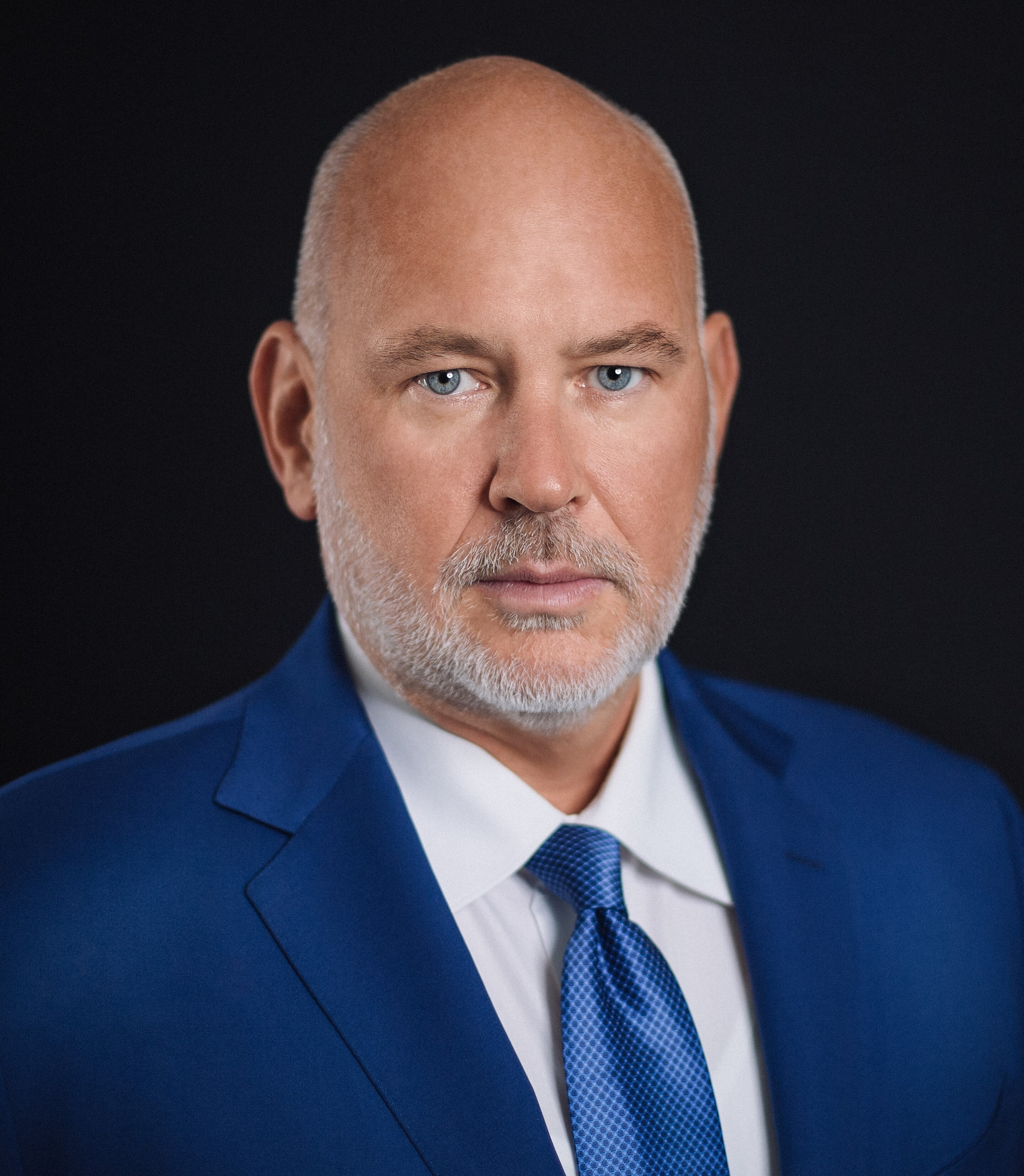
- Schmidt in 2023
- Born: Stephen Edward Schmidt; September 28, 1970 (age 56); North Plainfield, New Jersey, U.S.
- Education: University of Delaware (BA)
- Political party: Democratic (2020–present)
- Other political affiliations: Republican (1988–2018); Independent (2018–2020)
- Spouse: Angela Schmidt (divorced)
- Children: 3

Stephen Edward Schmidt (born September 28, 1970) is an American political and corporate strategist. He co-founded the Lincoln Project in 2019, in opposition to Donald Trump and his leadership of the Republican Party. He left the project in 2021 and has co-founded the Save America Movement, a PAC organized to oppose the actions of the Republican Party under Trump. He authors a podcast on Substack entitled, The Warning.

Earlier, Schmidt had worked on Republican political campaigns, including those of President George W. Bush, California governor Arnold Schwarzenegger, and U.S. senator from Arizona John McCain during his 2008 presidential campaign.

He was a vice chair at the public relations firm Edelman, where he advised CEOs and senior decision makers at Fortune 500 corporations, until he stepped down July 2018.

He became a political analyst for MSNBC in 2011, and appeared on the third season of Showtime's The Circus.

Schmidt has been extremely critical of Donald Trump and, of the GOP for supporting him. In June 2018, Schmidt renounced the Republican Party as "fully the party of Trump". In September 2020, Schmidt predicted that violence would erupt as a result of Trump's election denial proclamations. In early December 2020, he stated: "The Republican Party is an organized conspiracy for the purposes of maintaining power for self-interest, and the self-interest of its donor class ... It's no longer dedicated to American democracy."

Schmidt is a founder of The Lincoln Project, a group founded to campaign against Donald Trump. It became the most financially successful Super-PAC in American history, raising almost $100 million to campaign against Trump's failed 2020 re-election bid. He left the group in 2021.

In a podcast on December 14, 2020, Schmidt announced that he planned to register as a member of the Democratic Party.

== Early life and education ==
The son of a schoolteacher and a telecommunications executive, Schmidt grew up in North Plainfield, New Jersey, where he became an Eagle Scout, a tight end on the high school football team, a two-year member of the National Honor Society, and senior class vice president. In 1988, he was one of two graduating seniors voted "most likely to succeed" by his classmates at North Plainfield High School. As a young boy, he distributed campaign materials for Democrat Bill Bradley's 1978 United States Senate election in New Jersey.

Schmidt attended the University of Delaware from 1988 through the spring of 1993, majoring in political science. During this time, he registered as a Republican. He left three credits short of graduation because he did not pass a math course. Schmidt has said that he has been diagnosed with a learning disability that makes higher math difficult for him. He joined the Delta Tau Delta fraternity, and worked on the 1992 gubernatorial campaign of Delaware Republican B. Gary Scott. Schmidt completed his final math course and received his degree in 2013.

== Career ==
=== Early campaigns ===
In 1995, Schmidt managed the unsuccessful campaign for Kentucky Attorney General of Will T. Scott, who is formerly a Justice of the Kentucky Supreme Court. This Kentucky campaign's advertising strategy was featured in the second edition of George Magazine.

From 1997 to 1998, Schmidt was communications director for California state senator Tim Leslie. In 1998, he was the communications director for California State Treasurer Matt Fong's unsuccessful campaign to unseat U.S. senator Barbara Boxer. In 1999, he was the communications director for Lamar Alexander's presidential run, leaving in June when the campaign reduced its senior staff.

=== Washington, D.C. ===
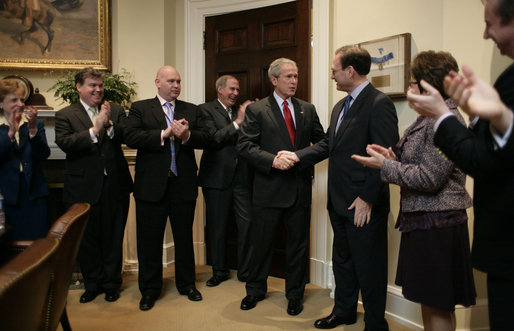
Schmidt (third from the left) as President George W. Bush congratulates newly confirmed Supreme Court Justice Samuel Alito in January 2006

By late 2000, Schmidt was communications director of the House Committee on Energy and Commerce.

In 2001, he became the communications director and chief communications strategist of the National Republican Congressional Committee.

Schmidt joined the Bush administration as a deputy assistant to the president and counselor to Vice President Dick Cheney. In 2004, he was a member of the senior strategic planning group led by White House adviser Karl Rove, that ran President George W. Bush's re-election campaign; Schmidt oversaw the reelection "war room". In 2005 and 2006, he was the White House strategist responsible for the U.S. Supreme Court nominations of Chief Justice John Roberts and Justice Samuel Alito .

=== California ===
In 2006, Schmidt left the White House to become the campaign manager of the successful re-election campaign for California governor Arnold Schwarzenegger, following the firing of Mike Murphy, Rob Stutzman and Pat Clarey. Prior to Schmidt's involvement, the governor's approval rating was 39%. Schwarzenegger was predicted to lose the 2006 election, having lost four ballot measures in 2005. The media strategist for Schwarzenegger's opponent Phil Angelides said that Schmidt "was able to restore Arnold's original appeal". Countering a national anti-Republican wave, Schwarzenegger was re-elected in a landslide winning by a margin 17 percentage points in what was considered "a remarkable political turnaround".

From there, he became a partner in Mercury Public Affairs in charge of Mercury's operations in California.

In 2007, Schmidt was named "Campaign Manager of the Year" by the American Association of Political Consultants.

=== 2008 McCain presidential campaign ===
John McCain called Steve Schmidt in 2007 as his campaign was faltering and a majority of campaign staff had resigned. McCain had gone from the Republican frontrunner on New Year's Day 2007 to last place and bankruptcy by July 2007 under the leadership of John Weaver and Rick Davis. After Schmidt joined the campaign as a volunteer, the McCain campaign moved from last place in the Republican primaries to win New Hampshire in January 2008, and then in South Carolina, Florida, California and other states, ultimately becoming the Republican nominee. McCain's comeback is regarded as among the greatest of the modern presidential era.

After securing the nomination, the McCain campaign was viewed as "unfocused". On July 2, 2008, Schmidt was appointed to head up day-to-day operations of the McCain campaign in response to concerns that the campaign lacked coordination and a clear message. Rick Davis retained the formal title of "campaign manager", and was in charge of the vice presidential selection and vetting process, alongside attorney A.B. Culvahouse, resulting in the selection of Alaska governor Sarah Palin.

He was dismayed after learning that Davis had promoted Palin as McCain's running mate, saying in an interview with Kyiv Post that "I thought she would bring down the entire campaign." Schmidt's relationship with Palin was tumultuous, with Schmidt confronting her on multiple occasions. He personally took charge of her debate preparations in the fall of 2008. On election night, Schmidt refused Palin's demands that she give a concession speech and reminded her that vice presidential candidates do not traditionally speak on election night, out of concern that her speaking would debase the peaceful transition of power.

In 2008, Schmidt worked to handle accusations that McCain was having an affair with a lobbyist. According to Schmidt, McCain afterward revealed to him that the accusation was true. In a 2022 article posted on The Warning, Schmidt wrote that "John McCain's lie became mine."

In 2022, Schmidt revealed he was deeply disillusioned with McCain by the end of the campaign and did not vote for him, and instead left his presidential vote blank.

==== Press commentary ====
The New York Times described Schmidt's management as having transformed the McCain campaign into "an elbows-out, risk-taking, disciplined machine", crediting him with aggressive responses to press criticism and creative methods of manipulating the news cycle.

Time's Michael Scherer, in an opinion piece from September 15, 2008, relating to Schmidt's involvement with John McCain's presidential campaign, stated that Schmidt, the "lord of outrage, has a long and prosperous career ahead of him".

On September 22, 2008, Schmidt accused The New York Times of bias against McCain in favor of his opponent, Barack Obama, calling the Times "a pro-Obama advocacy organization that every day impugns the McCain campaign, attacks Senator McCain, attacks Governor (Sarah Palin)" and saying "Whatever The New York Times once was, it is today not by any standard a journalistic organization."

==== Stance on gay rights ====
Schmidt turned down all public appearances during the 2008 Republican convention as a protest against the party's stance on gay marriage. His only appearance was before the Log Cabin Republicans, a gay Republican group, during which he voiced his support for gay rights. He said: "I just wanted to take a second to come by and pay my respect and the campaign's respect to your organization and to your group. Your organization is an important one in the fabric of our party" and "I admire your group and your organization and I encourage you to keep fighting for what you believe in because the day is going to come."

Schmidt said about his sister and her (lesbian) life partner: "On a personal level, my sister and her partner are an important part of my life and our children's life."

While leading the 2008 John McCain presidential campaign, the McCain campaign stated that "gay adoption is a state issue and does not endorse any federal legislation."

In February 2013, Schmidt, along with 74 other Republicans, co-signed an amicus brief to the Supreme Court of the United States in support of overturning Proposition 8. "The die is cast on this issue when you look at the percentage of younger voters who support gay marriage", he was quoted as saying. "As Dick Cheney said years ago, 'Freedom means freedom for everybody.'"

Schmidt was hired by the American Civil Liberties Union (ACLU) in June 2013 to help spearhead the campaign to strike down state-based laws prohibiting same-sex marriage.

=== Departure from the Republican Party ===
In May 2018, when President Donald Trump moved the U.S. embassy in Israel from Tel Aviv to Jerusalem, sparking violent Gaza border protests, Schmidt said Trump "has blood on his hands". The Embassy's opening coincided with the bloodiest day of the 2018 Gaza border protests, with more than 57 Palestinians killed. Despite initial violence after the decision, the United States under President Joe Biden decided in 2021 to keep the embassy in Jerusalem.

On June 19, 2018, Schmidt formally withdrew from the GOP over Trump's policy of separating immigrant families at the U.S. border with Mexico. He also cited Republican leadership for their failure to challenge the policy. Schmidt said of Trump, "We have in America – right now, at this hour – to understand that you have a lawless president, a vile president, a corrupt president, a mean, cruel president, who is seeking to remake the world order."

In June 2018, he tweeted: "the Republican Party ... is fully the party of Trump. It is corrupt, indecent and immoral. With the exception of a few Governors like Baker, Hogan and Kasich it is filled with feckless cowards who disgrace and dishonor the legacies of the party's greatest leaders ... Today the GOP has become a danger to our democracy and our values." During an August 2018 television appearance, he characterized Trumpism as follows:

We're seeing somebody go to mass rallies, constantly lie to incite fervor in a cult of personality base, we are seeing him make victimization honorable – they're all victims, right? We are seeing the allegation of conspiracy, the 'Deep State,' hidden, nefarious movements that only the leader can see. We see the scapegoating of minority populations, vulnerable populations, and lastly, the assertion that 'I need to exercise these powers that no president has ever claimed to have.' This is deliberate. This is an assault on objective truth. And once you get people to surrender their sovereignty, what is true is what the leader says is true, what is true is what the leader believes is true, even though what's true is staring you in the face. When that happens, you are no longer living in a democratic republic. Thirty-five percent of this country has checked out. They have joined a cult. They are obedient. They are obedient to the leader.

Describing his new political orientation, he stated:

This Independent voter will be aligned with the only party left in America that stands for what is right and decent and remains fidelitous to our Republic, objective truth, the rule of law and our Allies. That party is the Democratic Party.

On December 14, 2020, Schmidt announced he was joining the Democratic Party on his podcast, Battleground.

=== Other campaigns ===
On January 28, 2019, it was reported that Schmidt, along with Democratic consultant Bill Burton, had been hired to help shape a potential presidential run by former Starbucks CEO Howard Schultz. After Schultz decided to withdraw from the race, Schmidt returned to MSNBC. Schmidt helped advise Democratic Congressman Dean Phillips on the launch of Phillips' 2024 presidential bid, but was not a part of the campaign.

=== Other professional activities ===
==== Just Capital ====
Schmidt serves on the board of the nonprofit research organization Just Capital alongside Arianna Huffington, Deepak Chopra, and others.

==== Words Matter Media ====
In August 2018, Schmidt launched a podcast with Elise Jordan focused on the Trump presidency. Schmidt parted ways with the podcast when Jordan and executive producer Adam Levine questioned Schmidt about his role as adviser to potential 2020 presidential candidate Howard Schultz.

==== The Lincoln Project ====
Schmidt is a founding member of The Lincoln Project, a Super PAC organized in 2019 by former Republican operatives opposed to Donald Trump's 2020 campaign for re-election. He instead supported the 2020 campaign of Democratic nominee Joe Biden. As of 2020, the organization had raised more than $100 million, making it one of the most successful Super-PACs in history. Schmidt and members of The Lincoln Project guest starred on Showtime's The Circus: Inside the Greatest Political Show on Earth in 2020, giving viewers an insight to their strategies.

In January 2020, an employee of Lincoln Project executive Ron Steslow's advertising company Tusk informed Steslow that John Weaver had allegedly engaged in sexual harassment. Steslow subsequently informed fellow board members Reed Galen and Mike Madrid, and attorney Matt Sanderson. In response to a New York Times article detailing Weaver's contact with a 14-year-old boy while working as chief advisor to John Kasich in 2016, Schmidt stated that the incidents of harassment involving Weaver had taken place "before The Lincoln Project" existed.

Schmidt, who maintained that he had been unaware of the allegations before they became public, released a statement on January 31, 2021, "No Lincoln Project employee, intern, or contractors ever made an allegation of inappropriate communication about John Weaver that would have triggered an investigation by HR or by an outside employment counsel. In other words, no human being ever made an allegation about any inappropriate sexualized communications about John Weaver ever."

In February 2021, Schmidt stepped down from his position on The Lincoln Project board, which he had begun serving on following the departure of Steslow and Madrid only three weeks earlier, and released a statement in which he disclosed he was sexually molested as a teen and apologized to another co-founder, Jennifer Horn, for tweeting her private correspondence with a reporter. He also stated he was stepping down from the board in order to make room for the appointment of a woman to the board as the first step to "reform and professionalize" The Lincoln Project. Since then, Schmidt has criticized the media's coverage of the story, and the conduct of Galen, Steslow, Madrid, and Horn.

=== Media appearances ===
In 2018, Schmidt appeared on the third season of Showtime's The Circus: Inside the Greatest Political Show on Earth.

On September 25, 2021, he was interviewed by Rachel Maddow, on MS Now about the chaos being driven in American politics and the motivations behind the tactics.

== The Warning newsletter ==
In 2022, Schmidt established a newsletter, The Warning. Using that platform, on May 8, 2022, he published an article entitled No Books. No Money. Just the Truth. In it, he discussed the 2008 campaign to elect John McCain and revealed that after Schmidt and the campaign personnel effectively overcame coverage of a reported affair with a lobbyist, McCain told him the report was correct. Schmidt wrote about this in the article because he wanted to acknowledge his participation in "public lying".

The newsletter has featured his commentaries on current events and, as the chaos being driven in the USA increased and has followed his 2021 prediction when being interviewed by Rachel Maddow, he has provided links to communications by the Save America Movement he has co-founded and to interviews with other commentators on the situation.

== In popular culture ==
Schmidt was portrayed by Woody Harrelson in the 2012 HBO film Game Change. The film, based on the book of the same title by political journalists John Heilemann and Mark Halperin, focuses on the choice of Sarah Palin as John McCain's running mate in the 2008 United States presidential election. The film depicts Schmidt's inner turmoil over the conflict between his political values and Palin's effect on both McCain's campaign and Republican politics as a whole. Schmidt voiced his approval of the film, saying that "it tells the truth of the campaign" and that watching the film was tantamount to an "out-of-body experience".

== Personal life ==
Schmidt lives in Summit County, Utah. He has three children with his former wife, Angela Schmidt.
