= A Message from the People =

Studio album by Ray Charles
- Released: 1972
- Genres: R&B, soul
- Label: Tangerine/ABC
- Producer: Quincy Jones

Ray Charles chronology
A 25th Anniversary in Show Business Salute to Ray Charles (1971)	A Message from the People (1972)	Through the Eyes of Love (1972)

Singles from A Message from the People
- 1. "What Have They Done to My Song, Ma / America the Beautiful" Released: 1972; 2. "Hey Mister / There'll Be No Peace Without All Men as One" Released: 1973

A Message from the People is a studio album by the American R&B musician Ray Charles, released in 1972. MusicHound R&B: The Essential Album Guide called it "a protest album of sorts."

The album peaked at No. 52 on the Billboard 200.

== Production ==
The album was produced by Quincy Jones. Sid Feller worked on some of the song arrangements.

Charles opens "America the Beautiful" with the third verse of the song, and then returns to the first.

== Critical reception ==
Professional ratings
Review scores
Source	Rating
AllMusic	2.5/5 stars
Robert Christgau	B+
The Encyclopedia of Popular Music	4/5 stars
MusicHound R&B: The Essential Album Guide	4/5 stars
The Rolling Stone Album Guide	4/5 stars

Robert Christgau thought that Charles "turns Melanie's 'What Have They Done to My Song, Ma' into the outcry of black musicians everywhere—which is probably why it rocks (and swings) like nothing he's done in years." Ebony praised Charles's ability to give "wholly new dynamics to those patriotic vintages 'Lift Every Voice And Sing' and 'America The Beautiful'." The New York Times deemed the album "not one of his more memorable outings," writing that "the miracle of Ray Charles’ music is his constant ability to survive his material." The Detroit Free Press concluded that "this is one of the best albums he's ever made, because he gets so much of himself into [the] songs."

AllMusic wrote that "a gospel feel mixed with R&B locomotion is the engine that drives things here, but [Charles] also uses it to transform Melanie's 'What Have They Done to My Song, Ma' into a syncopated strut, and bring a Sunday Baptist church feel to the Dion hit 'Abraham, Martin and John'." Rolling Stone stated that the interpretation of "America the Beautiful" "added gospel overtones and soulful sway to its source material, pushing Charles’ audience to view the song in a new light."

== In politics ==
The recording of "Hey Mister", a song about government ignoring the needs of poor people, was played during a 1972 Joint Hearing Before the Special Subcommittee on Human Resources and the Subcommittee on Aging of the Committee on Labor and Public Welfare, where it was praised by Senator Alan Cranston.

Although not licensed for political use until the 2020 United States presidential campaign—when the Lincoln Project placed it in a video that urged people to vote out Donald Trump—Charles performed his version of "American the Beautiful" at the 1984 Republican National Convention.

== Track listing ==
No.	Title	Length
1.	"Lift Every Voice and Sing"	3:05
2.	"Seems Like I Gotta Do Wrong"	4:10
3.	"Heaven Help Us All"	4:05
4.	"There'll Be No Peace Without All Men as One"	3:25
5.	"Hey Mister"	3:54
6.	"What Have They Done to My Song, Ma"	3:45
7.	"Abraham, Martin and John"	4:49
8.	"Take Me Home, Country Roads"	3:32
9.	"Every Saturday Night"	3:22
10.	"America the Beautiful"	3:38

== Personnel ==
- Ray Charles: vocals, keyboards, producer
- Eric Gale, Jim Hall, Toots Thielemans: guitar
- Carol Kaye: electric bass (6, 7 , 8, 10)
- Bob Cranshaw, Chuck Rainey: electric bass
- Ray Brown: upright bass
- Grady Tate: drums
- Don Peake: acoustic guitar (10)
- Donnie Eubank: congas (6)
- Freddie Hubbard, Ernie Royal, Joe Newman: trumpet
- Jerome Richardson, Hubert Laws: reeds
- The Raelettes: backing vocals
- Sid Feller, Mike Post: arranger
- Quincy Jones: arranger, producer
- David Braithwaite: recording engineer
