= John Sipher =

American intelligence officer

John Sipher is a former American intelligence officer who served 28 years in the Central Intelligence Agency's National Clandestine Service, retiring in 2014 as a member of the Senior Intelligence Service. He is from Cortland, New York. He served as station chief in Serbia following the overthrow of Slobodan Milošević in 2000 and as station chief in Moscow. Since retirement, Sipher has worked as a foreign policy commentator and is a nonresident senior fellow at the Atlantic Council. He serves as a senior adviser to the Lincoln Project, The Steady State, and the Council on American Security.

== Education ==
Sipher attended Hobart and William Smith college, where he was captain of the Hobart lacrosse team during four consecutive national championship seasons. He earned a master's in international affairs from Columbia University, and "attended a variety of executive level courses at Harvard University, Northwestern University's Kellogg School of Management, Aspen Institute and the Intelligence Community's Executive Leadership program".

== CIA career ==
Sipher joined the CIA in 1986 and served multiple overseas tours as chief of station and deputy chief of station in Europe, Asia, and high-threat environments. He was a lead instructor at the CIA's clandestine training school and a lecturer at its leadership development program. He received the Distinguished Career Intelligence Medal.

Following the October 2000 overthrow of Slobodan Milošević, Sipher became station chief in Serbia. In a 2020 interview with Foreign Affairs, Sipher stated that the CIA funneled "certainly millions of dollars" into the anti-Milošević campaign, meeting with opposition aides outside Serbia's borders and providing cash.

== Post-CIA career ==
After retiring in 2014, Sipher is active as a speaker, author, and consultant. He co-founded Spycraft Entertainment, a firm providing content to the entertainment industry. He serves as a senior adviser to the Lincoln Project. He has written for The New York Times, The Atlantic, The Washington Post, Politico, Foreign Affairs, and Lawfare, and has appeared on PBS NewsHour, CNN, NPR, MSNBC, and BBC.

He is also the host of Mission Implausible, a politics podcast from iHeart Podcasts, where he and fellow CIA veteran Jerry O'Shea investigate "conspiracy theories past and present". He has shared his views and expertise about "What Hollywood gets right — and wrong — about the CIA."

Commenting on the poisoning of Russian opposition leader Alexei Navalny in August 2020, Sipher stated: "Whether or not Putin personally ordered the poisoning, he is behind any and all efforts to maintain control through intimidation and murder."

== Hunter Biden laptop letter ==
In October 2020, Sipher was among 51 former intelligence officials who signed a public letter stating that emails from a laptop belonging to Hunter Biden, reported by the New York Post, had "all the classic earmarks of a Russian information operation." The letter stated that the signatories did not know if the emails were genuine and did not have evidence of Russian involvement.

Sipher stated that the letter's signatories "never claimed that material about Hunter Biden was made up" but rather that "the story fit a narrative being pushed by people with ties to Russian intelligence."

On January 20, 2025, President Donald Trump signed an executive order revoking the security clearances of all surviving signatories of the letter.

== Views on Trump and national security ==
Sipher has written about and analyzed the Steele dossier. In September 2017, Just Security referenced Sipher:

Sipher concludes that the dossier's information on campaign collusion is generally credible when measured against standard Russian intelligence practices, events subsequent to Steele's reporting, and information that has become available in the nine months since Steele's final report. The dossier, in Sipher's view, is not without fault, including factual inaccuracies. Those errors, however, do not detract from an overarching framework that has proven to be ever more reliable as new revelations about potential Trump campaign collusion with the Kremlin and its affiliates has come to light in the nine months since Steele submitted his final report.

Sipher wrote that "Many of my former CIA colleagues have taken the [dossier] reports seriously since they were first published."

Sipher was one of three former CIA officers who objected to CIA Director Mike Pompeo's comments enjoining former agency officers to remain quiet after Trump's remarks at Helsinki. They also mentioned threats "from within": "We believe we have a responsibility to call out when our leadership is not doing enough to keep America safe." They also said they would speak "out against threats to national security even if they come from within".

After Trump's comments at the 2018 Helsinki Summit, Sipher spoke about Trump's difficult relationship with the U.S. intelligence community, and how his comments "probably set it back quite a bit". When asked about the intelligence community's feeling that Trump didn't have its back, he replied:

And we've never had a president who doesn't seem to take his job seriously. He doesn't seem to take the notion of national security and foreign policy seriously. He takes himself very, very seriously. And so this is probably a really hard nut to crack for the intelligence community to figure out how to best serve him.

Sipher considers Trump a Russian agent in a limited sense. In an article that describes the terms of art used by intelligence professionals, he starts by saying Trump is not an "agent" in the traditional sense, and later says he is "an agent of a foreign power". He explains:

I think it is entirely plausible that Mr. Trump is somehow compromised by his personal and financial dealings with Russia and Russians, but I do not think he is an 'agent' in the sense that intelligence professionals use the term. Let me explain. ...

Based on the U.S. definition of an agent, it is unlikely that President Trump is a recruited and controlled source of the Russian intelligence services. To a professional he is a nightmare. Yes, he is a cauldron of potentially exploitable vulnerabilities. ...

He clearly crossed a line and can be objectively labeled an agent of a foreign power in the standard definition of the word. From the Russian perspective, it is a win-win even if the relationship doesn't meet the cloak-and-dagger definition of a wholly clandestine espionage agent.

In December 2019, Sipher commented on phone records released by the House Intelligence Committee during the Trump impeachment inquiry, stating that Trump and Giuliani had "given the Russians ammunition they can use in an overt fashion, a covert fashion or in the twisting of information." Regarding Russian intelligence capabilities, he said: "I guarantee the Russians have the actual information".
