= The Lincoln Project =

American political action committee

- Named after: Abraham Lincoln
- Founded: December 17, 2019; 6 years ago
- Founders: George Conway; Steve Schmidt; John Weaver; Rick Wilson; Jennifer Horn; Ron Steslow; Reed Galen; Mike Madrid
- Type: Political action committee
- Registration no.: C00725820
- Purpose: The electoral defeat of Donald Trump and other Trumpist Republicans.
- Executive Director: Sarah Lenti
- Revenue: $78 million (Up to November 2020)
- Staff: Over 40 (plus over 60 interns) (2020)
- Website: lincolnproject.us

The Lincoln Project is an American political action committee (PAC) founded in December 2019 by moderate conservatives and former Republican Party members who oppose U.S. president Donald Trump and Trumpism. During the 2020 presidential election, the organization sought to prevent Trump's re-election and to defeat Republican candidates who supported him. In April 2020, they endorsed Democratic nominee Joe Biden. From 2022 to 2024, their efforts shifted to thwarting Trump's re-election bid in the 2024 presidential election, endorsing Democratic nominee Kamala Harris. Following Trump's victory, the Lincoln Project has focused on criticizing the actions of Trump's second presidency.

== History ==
=== Before the 2020 election ===
The committee was announced on December 17, 2019, in a New York Times op-ed by George Conway, Steve Schmidt, John Weaver, and Rick Wilson. Other co-founders include Jennifer Horn, Ron Steslow, Reed Galen, and Mike Madrid. Conway is an attorney and at that time was married to Kellyanne Conway, then an advisor to Trump; Schmidt managed John McCain's 2008 presidential campaign; Weaver oversaw McCain's presidential campaign in 2000; and Wilson is a media consultant. All four are outspoken critics of Trump; Schmidt left the Republican Party in 2018. Jennifer Rubin, in a Washington Post op-ed, described the four founders as "Some of the most prominent NeverTrump Republicans". Horn is a Republican operative and former chair of the New Hampshire Republican Party, Steslow is a marketing strategist and political consultant, Galen is an independent political consultant, and Madrid is a former political director for the California Republican Party. Galen serves as the Lincoln Project's treasurer. Sarah Lenti, a political consultant who had worked with Galen on the George W. Bush presidential campaign, was recruited as executive director.

The committee is named for Abraham Lincoln, a Republican who fought to keep the country unified. On February 27, 1860, Lincoln delivered his Cooper Union speech in Manhattan during his campaign to be the first Republican president. Several members of the committee—Schmidt, Wilson, Horn, Galen, Madrid, and Steslow—spoke in the same venue on the 160th anniversary of that talk, from the lectern that Lincoln had used. The group was outspoken in their criticism of Trump and the current divide in the Republican Party, with Madrid saying that "two views cannot exist in one party" and Steslow saying he will "vote blue no matter who". Schmidt warned that a second term with Trump would be "unrestrained and validated". The Lincoln Project also campaigned against U.S. Senators up for reelection who had supported Trump.

The members of Lincoln Project's advisory board—Conway, Schmidt, Weaver, Wilson, and Reed Galen—published another op-ed in The Washington Post on April 15, 2020, endorsing the presidential candidacy of former Vice President Joe Biden, the Democratic presidential nominee, writing: "We've never backed a Democrat for president. But Trump must be defeated." The op-ed argued that Trump was unqualified to deal with the COVID-19 pandemic and the ensuing economic downturn.

Stuart Stevens announced, on May 28, 2020, that he had joined the project. Stevens had previously been the chief strategist for Mitt Romney's presidential campaign in 2012. Prior to that, he had worked for George W. Bush and Bob Dole. Jeff Timmer, a former executive director of the Michigan Republican Party, is an adviser to the project. On June 2, 2020, the project announced the release of their podcast, Republicans Defeating Trump (later renamed The Lincoln Project), hosted by Ron Steslow.

On August 23, 2020, Kellyanne Conway announced that she was leaving her White House position to spend more time with her family. At the same time, George Conway announced that he was withdrawing from The Lincoln Project for similar reasons. On August 24, 2020, former Republican National Committee chair Michael Steele announced that he had joined the Lincoln Project. Weaver suffered a heart attack in mid-2020 and withdrew from the project for health reasons.

In October 2020, Ivanka Trump and husband Jared Kushner, through lawyer Marc Kasowitz (who had previously represented Donald Trump) threatened to sue the group for its Times Square billboard display mocking the couple for the Trump administration's response to the COVID-19 pandemic. The Lincoln Project said the billboard would remain, releasing a statement saying: "While we truly enjoy living rent-free in their heads, their empty threats will not be taken any more seriously than we take Ivanka and Jared. It is unsurprising that an administration that has never had any regard or understanding of our constitution would try to trample on our first amendment rights."

=== Post-election ===
In January 2021, responding to a magazine article accusing him of sexual misconduct spanning a period of years, co-founder John Weaver acknowledged having sent inappropriate sexual messages to multiple men, for which he apologized. According to The New York Times, Weaver offered young men professional support in exchange for sex; that report also accused him of cultivating a non-sexual online relationship with a fourteen-year-old boy and then engaging in "sexual banter" with him after his eighteenth birthday. Following the revelations, the Lincoln Project said "John's statement speaks for itself". It later issued a follow-up statement describing him as "a predator, a liar, and an abuser" and denouncing his "deplorable and predatory behavior". They denied having any knowledge of the allegations against Weaver until learning of it after it was revealed by The New York Times and other media, a claim vociferously denied by numerous members of the Project, who insisted that they had raised the issue with leadership many months earlier.

On February 5, 2021, Jennifer Horn, a founder, resigned from the organization, citing Weaver's misconduct. In addition, Ron Steslow, Mike Madrid, and George Conway, all founders and board members, had also left the organization by February 2021, the first two after disputes within the organization over power and money. On February 11, the Lincoln Project announced plans for an external investigation to review Weaver's conduct during his tenure with the group. On February 12, several other advisors also resigned. Steve Schmidt, a founder, also resigned from the board due to his involvement in leaking Horn's private direct messages; however, he remained with the Lincoln Project until November 2021.

The Lincoln Project prepared to sue Trump lawyer Rudy Giuliani for defamation after he claimed in a broadcast interview with Steve Bannon that the organization had planned the January 6 storming of the Capitol. Giuliani said he relied on an anonymous source and offered no evidence for his allegations. The Lincoln Project sent him a three-page letter on January 29, 2021, that read in part "You committed a textbook act of defamation. You publicly accused The Lincoln Project of an infamous and criminal act that it had nothing to do with, as you very well know." They demanded an apology by February 3.

In October 2021, a group of five people organized by the Lincoln Project, carrying tiki-torches and dressed like the white supremacists who marched in Charlottesville, Virginia in 2017, appeared in front of the campaign bus of Glenn Youngkin, the Republican nominee for governor of Virginia in the 2021 election. They called the stunt "a demonstration" designed to highlight "Youngkin's continued failure to denounce Donald Trump's 'very fine people on both sides'" comment. The stunt was criticized by Youngkin's campaign, as well as by the campaign of his rival Democratic nominee Terry McAuliffe and others.

== Television ads ==
The Lincoln Project produced a number of anti-Trump and pro-Biden television advertisements. The Washington Post columnist Jennifer Rubin called the project's ads "devastating for several reasons: They are produced with lightning speed, and thereby catch the public debate at just the right moment; they hammer Trump where he is personally most vulnerable (e.g., concerns about his vigor, concerns about foreign corruption); and they rely to a large extent on Trump himself—his words and actions." Keith Edwards joined the Lincoln Project as Director of Communications in 2020, taking charge of its digital messaging and social media strategy during the campaign against Donald Trump's re-election.

As of June 2020, about two-thirds of the group's television advertisements were focusing on the 2020 presidential election, but the Lincoln Project also created ads backing Democrats in other races, such as an ad in Montana promoting Governor Steve Bullock's Senate candidacy against incumbent Republican Steve Daines. Additionally, they released videos attacking Republican Senators Cory Gardner, Martha McSally, Thom Tillis, Susan Collins, Joni Ernst and Majority Leader Mitch McConnell, all of whom were up for reelection in 2020, as enablers of Trump.

On March 17, 2020, the committee released a video, titled Unfit, which criticized Trump for his handling of the COVID-19 pandemic in the United States.

On May 4, 2020, the group released Mourning in America, a video styled after Ronald Reagan's Morning in America 1984 campaign ad. The ad focused on Trump's handling of the coronavirus crisis and said that the country was "weaker and sicker and poor[er]" under Trump's leadership. (Note: Source transcripts differ slightly on wording.) On June 1, 2020, the Lincoln Project released another ad, Flag of Treason, that blasted Trump's record on race relations in the U.S., highlighted the use of the Confederate battle flag by Trump supporters at Trump rallies, and emphasized the support Trump has received from white nationalists. Both ads ran on television in crucial swing states.

In early June 2020, the Lincoln Project released an ad, Mattis, that repeated criticisms of Trump by former Secretary of Defense Jim Mattis, a retired Marine Corps general, following the Lafayette Square and Saint John's Church attacks against protesters, and asked viewers, "Who do you trust: the coward or the commander?" The ad also criticized Trump for having "dodged the draft" and for hiding "in a deep bunker—firing off tweets".

On June 17, 2020, the Lincoln Project released two ads. The first, entitled #TrumpIsNotWell, ran 45 seconds and showed a video of Trump walking slowly and haltingly down a ramp at West Point, and a video of Trump appearing to struggle to lift a glass of water, with narration suggesting that Trump was physically unfit. The ad's voiceover said, over images of Trump: "He's shaky, weak, trouble speaking, trouble walking. So why aren't we talking about this? The most powerful office in the world needs more than a weak, unfit, shaky president. Trump doesn't have the strength to lead, nor the character to admit." The ad was controversial: some observers viewed it as appropriate in light of Trump's past comments and mockery about the health of his rivals, while disability rights activist Rebecca Cokley of the Center for American Progress criticized the ad as ableist. The second ad released on June 17, Tulsa, criticized Trump for planning a campaign rally in Tulsa, Oklahoma (the site of the 1921 Tulsa race massacre) on Juneteenth, a holiday marking the abolition of African American slavery.

On June 18, 2020, the Lincoln Project released an ad entitled Chyna, attacking Trump on his China policy, with narration saying "They know who Donald Trump is: weak, corrupt, ridiculed, China beats him every time. No matter what he says, China's got his number." The ad attacked Trump for his handling of the trade war with China and made reference to Ivanka Trump's business dealings in China, including the Chinese government's grant of trademarks to her. The project released the ad just after Trump's former National Security Adviser John Bolton published an excerpt from his memoir, The Room Where It Happened, in which Bolton wrote that Trump had asked Chinese leader Xi Jinping to assist him in getting elected and had told Xi that he should continue building internment camps detaining Uyghurs. The ad made reference to Bolton's book.

On June 28 and 30, 2020, the Lincoln Project released two ads, respectively entitled Bounty and Betrayed, attacking Trump for failing to respond to reports of an alleged Russian bounty program targeting U.S. troops in Afghanistan. In Bounty, a narrator said, "Now we know Vladimir Putin pays a bounty for the murder of American soldiers. Donald Trump knows too and does nothing." In Betrayed, former Navy SEAL and emergency room doctor Dan Barkhuff said that "any commander-in-chief with a spine would be stomping the living shit out of some Russians right now—diplomatically, economically, or, if necessary, with the sort of asymmetric warfare they're using to send our kids home in body bags." Barkhuff called Trump "either a coward who can't stand up to an ex-KGB goon" or "complicit".

On July 2, 2020, the Lincoln Project released Fellow Traveler, an ad saying in Russian with English subtitles that "Comrade Trump" had been "chosen" by Vladimir Putin and had "accepted the help of Mother Russia". The ad featured communist imagery such as the hammer and sickle, as well as photographs of Bolshevik revolutionary Vladimir Lenin and Soviet leaders from Joseph Stalin to Mikhail Gorbachev and referenced the Russian interference in the 2016 United States elections.

The group has occasionally created ads in collaboration with television and film figures: the ad Debt was written by John Orloff, while the ad Wake Up was written and directed by Jon Turteltaub. Harrison Ford and Mark Hamill narrated the ads Fauci and Absentee respectively.

== Fundraising and expenditures ==
OpenSecrets, which tracks money spent on politics, reported that the Lincoln Project raised $87,404,908 and spent $81,956,298 during the 2019-2020 election cycle. $51,406,346 came from individuals who had donated $200 or more. (An earlier estimate was $78 million (~$95.5 million in 2025) from its creation until the November 2020 election.) By the end of March 2020, it had raised $2.6 million (~$3.18 million in 2025) in contributions. Its fundraising substantially increased in subsequent months; from July to September 2020, the Lincoln Project raised $39 million (~$47.7 million in 2025).

The group started out with few major donors; as of October 2020, about 39% of contributions to the group came from small donors ($200 or less). This is an unusually high proportion of small-dollar donors for a super PAC; most super PACs are almost exclusively funded by wealthy contributors. The top contributors are classical musician and Getty family heir Gordon Getty ($1 million), Stephen Mandel ($1 million); and the Sixteen Thirty Fund ($300,000). Six-figure contributions came from Hollywood producer David Geffen, investor John Pritzker and financier Jonathan Lavine. Other major donors include Silicon Valley investors Ron Conway, Michael Moritz and Chris Sacca, financier Andrew Redleaf, Walmart heiress and philanthropist Christy Walton, Martha Karsh (who is married to billionaire financier Bruce Karsh), and Continental Cablevision CEO Amos Hostetter Jr.

As of May 2020, the group's expenditures were mostly in producing, buying, and placing ads. OpenSecrets, a campaign-finance watchdog group, wrote at the time that (like most PACs) most of the Lincoln Project's money had gone to pay subcontractors, "making it difficult to follow the money" to vendors, and that "almost all" of the money raised had gone to firms run by the group's board members, specifically Galen's Summit Strategic Communications and Steslow's Tusk Digital. $50 million of the $90 million raised went to firms controlled by the group's leaders, according to a February 2021 AP News report. The Lincoln Project eventually grew to an organization of over 40 employees and over 60 interns.

== Strategies ==
The Lincoln Project achieved success in having its ads go viral and with its "nontraditional strategy of playing mind games with the president". Politico said that the Lincoln Project "successfully established itself as a squatter in Trump's mental space, thanks to several factors: members each boasting hundreds of thousands of social media followers, rapidly cut ads that respond to current events and a single-minded focus on buying airtime wherever Trump is most likely to be bingeing cable news that day, whether it's the D.C. market or his golf courses across the country." Quoting co-founder George Conway as saying that the project takes advantage of Trump's narcissistic reactivity, inability to take criticism, and inability to think ahead, Roxanne Roberts wrote in The Washington Post that the project's ads are "specifically designed to trigger the president" so that he "talk(s) about things he shouldn't be talking about", in effect "raising millions of dollars...for the Lincoln Project".

The Lincoln Project's output has been prolific in terms of both tweets and videos. The group's ads sometimes made use of comedy, as in the ad Trumpfeld (a spoof of Seinfeld), in which laugh tracks are laid over segments of a Chris Wallace interview with Trump, and in Nationalist Geographic (a spoof of National Geographic), which mocks Trump as "Impotus americanus," "the most corrupt of its species".

Joanna Weiss of Northeastern University's Experience magazine wrote in Politico that most of the Lincoln Project's ads "pack an emotional punch, using imagery designed to provoke anxiety, anger and fear—aimed at the very voters who were driven to (Trump) by those same feelings in 2016", citing scientific research indicating that fear-mongering ads might be effective with Republican voters. Project co-founder Reed Galen described the strategy as "(speaking) to Republican voters with Republican language and Republican iconography".

In addition to targeting the Washington media market and thus Trump himself, the project has also targeted swing states like Wisconsin, Michigan, North Carolina and Pennsylvania, and has spent money against Republican Senate candidates in Arizona, Iowa, Montana, and other states. As summarized by Lenti after the election, "We were focused on Arizona, Florida, North Carolina, Pennsylvania, Michigan, Wisconsin and Georgia. [...] We were looking at college-educated women, suburban women, older men."

The project has labeled a faction within the Republican Party which they claim disenfranchises African American voters as the Jim Crow caucus.

== Reception ==
Democratic strategist James Carville praised the group for being more efficient and aggressive than Democratic PACs, saying: "Let me tell you, the Lincoln group and The Bulwark, these Never Trumper Republicans, the Democrats could learn a lot from them. They're mean. They fight hard. And we don't fight like that." The New Republic wrote that "they make punches that Democratic officials and operatives often seem inclined to pull".

Writing in The Washington Post, Jennifer Rubin said the Lincoln Project stood "head and shoulders above all the rest in the hard work of beating back President Trump and Trumpism" and wrote of the group's founders: "They made their careers helping to elect Republicans, but in the era of Trump, they have put partisanship aside in the cause of patriotism and defense of American democracy. Their ads have been the most effective and memorable of the presidential campaign, singeing Trump in a way Democrats have not quite mastered."

Author and columnist Max Boot praised the Lincoln Project for "turning out brilliant videos at a relentless pace that puts most political organizations to shame" and for seeking to demolish "the Trumpified GOP" and replace it with "a sane and sober center-right party in America". Boot wrote that the Lincoln Project's founders, by "leading the charge against the Republican Party, ... have shown greater fealty to conservative principles than 99 percent of elected Republicans."

The Lincoln Project was criticized by former Romney campaign staffer Oren Cass, who described it as "a group of political operatives who are not conservatives".

Writing in The Atlantic, Andrew Ferguson described the ads as "personally abusive, overwrought, pointlessly salacious, and trip-wired with non sequiturs". Rich Lowry, writing for the conservative publication National Review, described the Lincoln Project's stated goals as "self-serving tripe, as a glance at the insult-filled Twitter feeds, op-eds, and cable appearances of the principals instantly demonstrates", and described the group's advertisements as being "clearly meant to garner retweets rather than to speak to on-the-fence voters".

Jeet Heer wrote in The Nation that "To the extent that the ads articulate any political vision, it is a desire to return to the hard-line military aggression of the George W. Bush era." Heer also wrote in March 2021: "The ineffectiveness of the ads should be no surprise. Twenty twenty was a polarizing election... In that environment, the Lincoln Project made the wrong arguments to the wrong voters" and described the group as a "successful scam".

== Influence ==
Project co-founder Reed Galen has said some of the ads are meant for an audience of one: Trump himself. The Lincoln Project's feud with Trump enhanced its national profile, including through earned media, and the group said it raised $1.4 million (~$1.71 million in 2025) after Trump's tweets responding to the May 4, 2020, Mourning in America video.

Political science professor Lincoln Mitchell wrote that the group's "brutal" ads "seem to have been successful at getting inside Trump's head" and that their work is "attracting attention across and beyond the political spectrum". However, Mitchell said that the project's expenditures $1.4 million (~$1.71 million in 2025) (July 2020) are nowhere near enough to buy enough airtime on television—still America's most popular news source—to reach uncommitted voters, and that it is uncertain whether the ability to trend on social media will translate into votes for Joe Biden. The New York Times wrote in October 2020 that "The Lincoln Project ads have been dismissed by some as "anti-Trump porn," more concerned with going viral than moving voters."

A May 20, 2020, ad entitled GOP Cribs, which highlights the significant wealth that Trump campaign manager Brad Parscale built up while working for Trump, is believed to have played a role in Parscale's removal from that position.

Paige Williams published a long analysis in The New Yorker, highlighting the project's influence on Republican politics and claiming that its conservative-style attacks on Donald Trump were playing a very decisive role in the 2020 election.

After the 2020 election, critics including U.S. Representative Alexandria Ocasio-Cortez and Jacobin editor-at-large David Sirota questioned the Lincoln Project's effectiveness after Trump increased his share of the Republican vote compared to 2016. Lenti, the Lincoln Project's executive director, argued that in the states and demographic groups it had targeted in its "digital get-out-the-vote operation", "it was moving 1 to 4 percent of those voters who were independents or Republicans to cross the line to make the difference in those states for Biden".

== Members ==
=== Founders ===
- George Conway (has since left the organization)
- Steve Schmidt (has since left the organization)
- John Weaver (has since left the organization)
- Rick Wilson
- Jennifer Horn (has since left the organization)
- Ron Steslow (has since left the organization)
- Reed Galen
- Mike Madrid (has since left the organization)

=== Advisors ===
- Kurt Bardella (until February 12, 2021)
- Rachel Bitecofer
- Sally Canfield
- Zack Czajkowski
- Susan Del Percio
- Molly Jong-Fast
- Sarah Lenti
- Kate Salkowitz
- Windsor Mann
- Tom Nichols (until February 12, 2021)
- Tara Setmayer
- John Sipher
- Michael Steele
- Stuart Stevens
- Jeff Timmer
- Chris Vance
- Fred Wellman

== See also ==
- 43 Alumni for Biden
- Republican Voters Against Trump
- List of former Trump administration officials who endorsed Joe Biden
- List of Republicans who opposed the Donald Trump 2016 presidential campaign
- List of Republicans who opposed the Donald Trump 2020 presidential campaign
- REPAIR
- Right Side PAC
