= Jon Huntsman 2012 presidential campaign =

American political campaign

Jon Huntsman for President
- Campaign: 2012 United States presidential election
- Candidate: Jon Huntsman, Jr. Governor of Utah (2005–2009); Ambassador to China (2009–2011)
- Affiliation: Republican Party
- Status: Suspended, January 16, 2012
- Headquarters: Manchester, New Hampshire
- Key people: Matt David (manager); Neil Ashdown (Dep. Manager); Conyers Davis (Operations Director); John Weaver (advisor); Whit Ayers (Pollster)
- Receipts: US$8,919,959 (2012-06-30)
- Slogan: Country First

Website
- Official Campaign website

The Jon Huntsman presidential campaign of 2012 began in mid-2011 when Ambassador and former Governor of Utah Jon Huntsman, Jr. announced his candidacy for the Republican Party (GOP) nomination for President of the United States in the 2012 election. On May 3, 2011, Huntsman announced his intentions to file a political action committee with the Federal Election Commission (named "H-PAC"). Subsequently, Huntsman announced on June 14, 2011, he was running for president and made an official announcement in Liberty State Park one week later on June 21.

Huntsman sought to establish himself as an anti-negative candidate and take the "high road". In his announcement, he also stated "I don't think you need to run down someone's reputation in order to run for the office of President." Huntsman aggressively touted himself as a fiscal conservative, pledging considerable business and personal tax cuts as well as a foreign policy moderate, calling for a decrease in defense spending and withdrawal from Afghanistan, while increasing pressure on Iran and support for Israel.

Huntsman announced his withdrawal from the race on January 16, 2012, prior to the South Carolina primary and endorsed eventual nominee Mitt Romney.

== Background ==
=== Experience ===
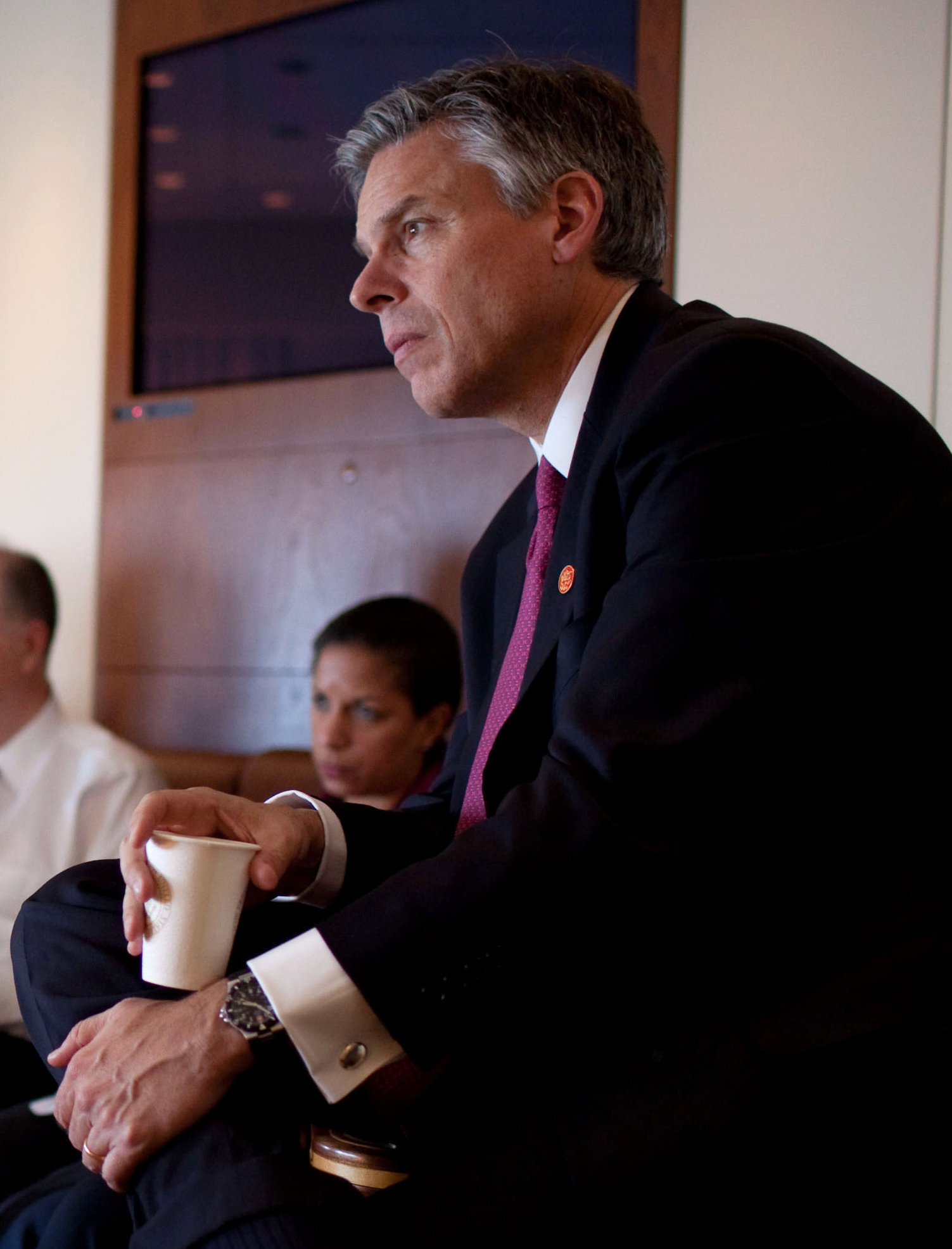
Huntsman on Air Force One during his tenure as U.S. Ambassador to China

Huntsman served as Governor of Utah from January 2005 until August 2009, but resigned during the first year of his second term to serve as United States Ambassador to China, a position to which he was appointed by Democratic President Barack Obama. Speculation of a Huntsman candidacy for the 2012 Republican presidential nomination began circulating in the media as early as 2008 and 2009, while Huntsman was still unsure about his political future. In August 2010, a group of political strategists with ties to Huntsman formed a political action committee now called "Horizon PAC" that had the resources to provide a framework for launching Huntsman's campaign in the event he chose to run. The PAC was formed in part as an effort to draft Huntsman into seeking the GOP nomination.

On January 31, 2011, Huntsman submitted his formal resignation from his post as U.S. Ambassador to China. The resignation was to take effect April 30, 2011, and Huntsman indicated his plans to return to the United States by May 2011. This move spurred further widespread speculation of Huntsman making a 2012 Republican presidential bid.

On May 3, after having left his post as Ambassador and returned to the United States, Huntsman formed an official fundraising political action committee, building on the efforts of the previously established Horizon PAC. On May 18, Huntsman opened his 2012 national campaign headquarters in Orlando, Florida.

=== Political positions ===
Huntsman has been described as "a conservative technocrat-optimist with moderate positions who was willing to work substantively with President Barack Obama" by Huffington Post political reporter, Jason Linkins. As Governor, Huntsman listed economic development, health-care reform, education, and energy security as his top priorities. Huntsman oversaw large tax cuts and advocated reorganizing the way that services were distributed so that the government would not become overwhelmed by the state's fast growing population. Huntsman also proposed a plan to reform health-care, mainly through the private sector, by using tax breaks and negotiation to keep prices down.

In a 2008 evaluation of state Governors' fiscal policies, the libertarian Cato Institute praised Huntsman's conservative tax policies, ranking him in a tie for fifth place on overall fiscal policy. He was particularly lauded for his efforts to cut taxes, where he received the highest score on tax policy of all 50 governors. The report specifically highlighted his reductions of the sales tax and simplification of the tax code.

Huntsman strongly supported civil unions for years but not same-sex marriage; and supported legislation as Governor that would have allowed civil unions for same-sex couples in the state. In 2007, in response to the problem of global warming, Huntsman signed the Western Climate Initiative, by which Utah joined with other governments in agreeing to pursue targets for reduced production of greenhouse gases. He also appeared in an advertisement sponsored by Environmental Defense, in which he said, "Now it's time for Congress to act by capping greenhouse-gas pollution."

On foreign policy, Huntsman has repeatedly stated: "We need to continue working closely with China to convince North Korea to abandon its nuclear weapons program." He has also named Taiwan, human rights, and Tibet among the "areas where we have differences with China" and vowed "robust engagement" on human rights.

On August 31, Huntsman made a major policy announcement, calling for, amongst other things such as more aggressive action on completing free trade agreements, a tax policy modeled on the Simpson-Bowles plan, specifically: elimination of the Alternative Minimum Tax, elimination of taxes on capital gains and dividends, elimination of all deductions and credits, in favor of significantly lower general rates, with brackets of 8, 14 and 23 percent, and lowering the general corporate rate from 35 to 25%.

== Campaign details ==
=== Speculation ===
On November 12, 2008, Politico called him a possible 2012 contender. Washington Post blogger Chris Cillizza also speculated Huntsman as a possible candidate.

Many Republicans saw Huntsman as a possible rising star in the party. Utah businessman and Republican activist Tim Bridgewater said, "Huntsman has a very bright future". Huntsman said, "I think there will be a lot of personalities emerging between now and 2012. I think the party needs to be smart enough to maintain an open mind. Obama was nowhere on the radar screen four years ago". In June 2009, Huntsman top advisor John Weaver, who was also an advisor for McCain, stated, "I firmly believe that Huntsman and people like him are the prescription for what ails us. But I have the feeling that our party maybe won't order that prescription in 2012."

In January 2011, Newsweek published an article entitled "The Manchurian Candidate" which featured an interview with Huntsman. When asked whether he intended to run for president in 2012, Huntsman declined to comment. The article generated significant speculation about a likely Huntsman 2012 presidential bid.

=== Announcement ===
Huntsman announced his campaign on June 21, 2011, in Liberty State Park, with the Statue of Liberty visible behind him while delivering his speech. The location was chosen in homage to President Ronald Reagan, who launched his own presidential campaign from the same location. Referring to Reagan's announcement, Huntsman remarked in his own speech, "He assured us we could 'make America great again,' and under his leadership we did. I stand in his shadow as well as the shadow of this magnificent monument to our liberty."

In the lead-up to his official announcement, Huntsman gained attention for his campaign's unconventional TV ads, produced by veteran GOP strategist Fred Davis III, featuring a lone motocross rider traveling through rugged terrain as music plays in the background, while facts about Huntsman appear on the screen. The ads were widely parodied, including by the Utah Democratic Party and Rick Santorum's campaign.

A notable gaffe made by the Huntsman campaign in the moments before the announcement speech were misspelled press passes distributed to reporters on hand to cover the announcement which read "John Huntsman for President", erroneously adding an extra "H" to Huntsman's name. Aides reportedly scrambled in an effort to cease the distribution of the misspelled passes.

=== Staff ===
Susie Wiles, who ran Rick Scott's successful 2010 gubernatorial campaign in Florida, worked first as executive director of H-PAC and then as Huntsman's campaign manager. Her appointment dovetailed with Huntsman's strategic emphasis on winning the early Florida primary. She resigned on July 21, 2011, stating, "I signed up to get it started. It's like a phase. This morning I said it's time to move on." She went on to explain that she had never intended to stay on with the campaign indefinitely, but instead had plans "to resume [her] life and get home." Wiles stated her intention to continue to be a "friend and confidante of Huntsman." Matt David, previously the campaign's communications director, replaced Wiles as campaign manager.

The campaign hired Neil Ashdown, chief of staff to Huntsman when he was Governor of Utah and Ambassador to China, as deputy campaign manager. Conyers Davis, who worked with former California Governor Arnold Schwarzenegger and David Cameron's Conservative Party was hired as campaign operations director. Matt David served as the campaign's first communications director, before replacing Wiles as campaign manager, with Jake Suski as deputy communications director and Tim Miller serving as Huntsman's spokesperson. Kris Anderson is leading research for the campaign, with Shawn Reinschmiedt and Dan Comstock's M Street Insight doing research consulting work.

In June 2011, C. Boyden Gray joined the Huntsman team as policy chair. Gray served as White House Counsel to President George H. W. Bush and EU Ambassador under George W. Bush. In early July 2011, Mark McIntosh was appointed as the Huntsman campaign's policy director. McIntosh had been working as counsel on energy and natural resource issues at Boyden Gray & Associates, and he previously served as Deputy General Counsel for the White House Council on Environmental Quality under President George W. Bush. Randy Schriver and Steve Bogden served as Huntsman's respective chief foreign policy and economic advisors.

=== Fundraising ===
A day after announcing his campaign for president, Huntsman raised $1.2 million, and approximately $4.1 million in the first weeks of his candidacy. Huntsman, who has a speculated net-worth between $11 and $74 million, was reported to have contributed "less than half" of his campaign's $4.1 million haul. Before his entry into the race, Huntsman was adamant about avoiding self-financing a campaign, stating "Unless you can raise it legitimately, you're not going to win". However, Huntsman stated he would contribute in order to "prime the pump" during a campaign visit in South Carolina. In September, Huntsman reportedly contributed $500,000 to his campaign in order to make payroll. One of Huntsman's greatest contributors was his father Jon Huntsman, Sr., who donated around $2 million to his campaign. Walmart heirs Jim Walton and Christy Walton donated $102,500 and $52,500 to Huntsman, respectively.

With no obligation to do so due to his late entry into the race, the Huntsman Campaign agreed not to file FEC paperwork for the Second Quarter of 2011 ending on June 30, 2011, as reported by the ABC.

== 2011 developments ==
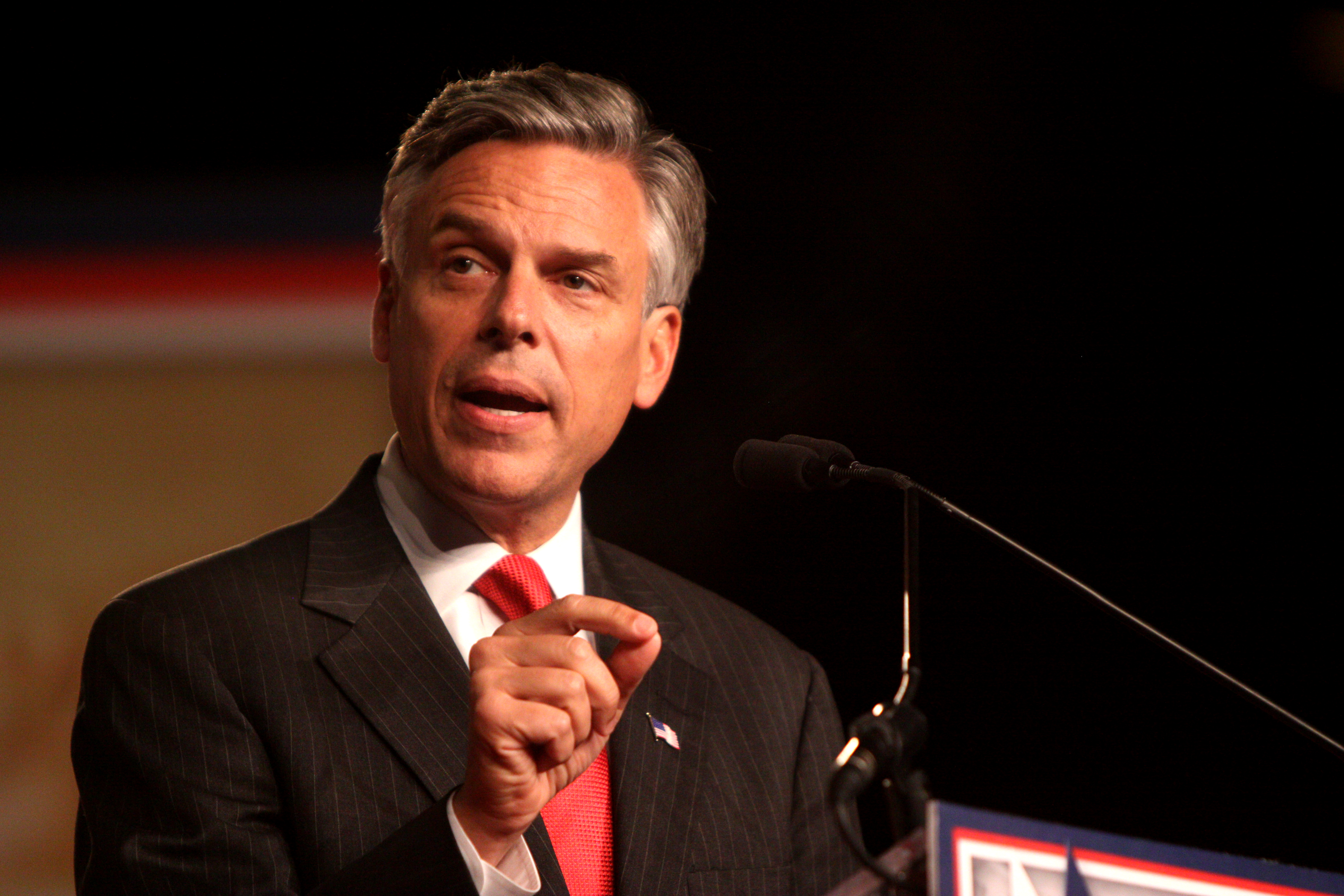
Huntsman speaking at a political conference in Orlando, Florida

=== Twitter remark and political positioning ===
To be clear. I believe in evolution and trust scientists on global warming. Call me crazy.

— Jon Huntsman Jr.'s Twitter

Huntsman gained media attention when he responded to Texas Governor Rick Perry's entrance into the GOP primary by attacking Perry's views on climate change and evolution through Twitter. Huntsman's tweet was reportedly "re-tweeted" over 3,600 times – the most of any GOP presidential candidate.

Huntsman was scheduled to speak at the Republican Leadership Conference held in New Orleans in June 2011, but canceled. He received 25% of the vote in the annual presidential straw-poll, finishing second behind Ron Paul (41%) and ahead of Michele Bachmann (13%).

In interviews following his apparent centrist attacks on Perry and Bachmann, Huntsman reiterated a "center right" position. On a This Week interview in August, Huntsman labeled himself a "center right candidate" for a "center right country" and criticized President Obama and his GOP opponents for representing "fringes" on the political spectrum. Huntsman was frequently described as "the media's favorite Republican", with a Florida Today columnist calling him "our man Huntsman".

=== August debate ===
Huntsman participated in his first presidential debate on August 11, 2011, in Iowa. The debate was co-sponsored by the Republican Party of Iowa, Fox News, and the Washington Examiner. Huntsman's first question, directed by moderator Chris Wallace was:

You supported a stimulus package in 2009. In fact, you said the Obama stimulus package was not big enough. As governor, you signed onto a regional cap-and-trade market. You endorsed civil unions for same-sex couples. And you served as President Obama's ambassador to China. Some people have suggested that maybe you're running for president in the wrong party.

Huntsman responded by deflecting Wallace's criticism and argued that his compromise was necessary and that his record as Governor of Utah represented a fiscally conservative position:

I'm proud of my service to this country. If you love your country, you serve her. During a time of war, during a time of economic hardship, when asked to serve your country in a sensitive position where you can actually bring a background to help your nation, I'm the kind of person who's going to stand up and do it, and I'll take that philosophy to my grave... In terms of the stimulus you talked about, it was failed. And let me tell you what I talked about with respect to the stimulus. I talked about the need for more tax cuts in the stimulus... We had done historic tax cuts. We created a flat tax in the state of Utah, exactly what needs to happen in this country. We got the economy moving. We became the number-one job creator in this nation and the best managed state. That's exactly what needs to happen in this nation. I am running on my record, and I am proud to run on my record.

=== September to January ===
In early September, Huntsman began shifting campaign resources from Florida to New Hampshire; by moving staffers, Huntsman had the largest operational staff there at the time. The development came as the campaign reorganized New Hampshire operations, firing its campaign manager in charge of the state, Ethan Elion. Elion was replaced by Sarah Crawford Stewart, who had served as state-director of Minnesota Governor Tim Pawlenty's New Hampshire campaign before he suspended his bid after the Ames Straw Poll.

Huntsman received a major endorsement in late-September 2011 from Tom Ridge, former Governor of Pennsylvania and Secretary of Homeland Security under George W. Bush. Ridge appeared with Huntsman at an event at Saint Anselm College in New Hampshire who called Huntsman "the only candidate with demonstrated success at the state, national and international levels." After the endorsement and a series of campaign events in New Hampshire, a Suffolk University poll showed Huntsman in third place in New Hampshire with 10% of likely voters, behind Mitt Romney (41%) and Ron Paul (14%) and ahead of Rick Perry, Michele Bachmann, Sarah Palin (who had not yet declared an intention of running) and Newt Gingrich among others. Huntsman made New Hampshire the focus of his campaign, and held over 100 campaign events there.

When the state of Nevada threatened to move up its nominating contest which would have interfered with the New Hampshire primary, Huntsman elected to "boycott" Nevada and skip a presidential debate held in Las Vegas on October 18, 2011, in protest.

In late 2011, Huntsman was endorsed by several New Hampshire-based newspapers. The Keene Sentinel and the Valley News, both endorsed Huntsman on December 18 over neighboring Governor and front-runner in the state Mitt Romney. In addition, the Concord Monitor endorsed Huntsman on December 22. Huntsman increased his presence in the state as the year closed, as the pro-Huntsman "Our Destiny" PAC began to increase ad buys in the state A Boston Globe poll released in late December had Huntsman polling in double digits, drawing 11% versus 17% for Gingrich and Paul. All three nonetheless remained well back of Romney at 39% support, however.

Although Huntsman emphasized his opposition to negative campaigning, he did run an ad attacking Ron Paul with Twilight Zone theme as background music, and implying that Paul's views were outside the mainstream.

== 2012 Caucuses and primaries ==
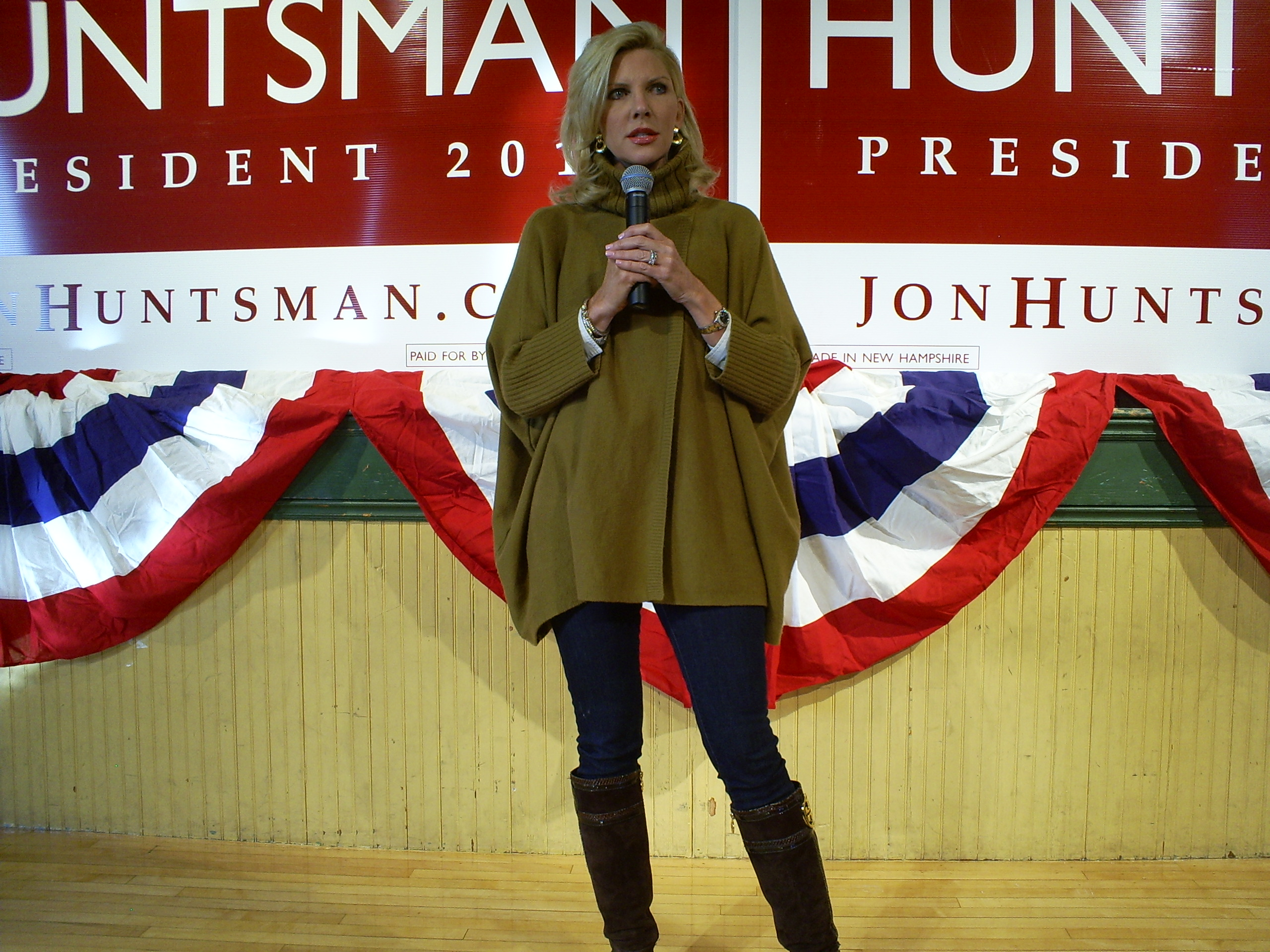
Huntsman's wife Mary Kaye campaigning in New Hampshire ahead of the primary.

=== Iowa ===
Huntsman, who held no events in Iowa, finished seventh in the January 3 Iowa caucuses with 739 votes, or 0.6 percent; ahead of only withdrawn candidate Herman Cain and minor candidate Buddy Roemer. Huntsman reiterated a focus on the January 10 New Hampshire primary.

=== New Hampshire ===
2012 GOP Nomination
Jon Huntsman, Jr.
- Iowa
  - 7th place
- New Hampshire
  - 3rd place
- South Carolina
  - 7th place

Ahead of the New Hampshire primary, Huntsman received newspaper endorsements from The Citizen as well as the Boston Globe, the largest newspaper in neighboring Massachusetts, rival Romney's home-state. According to Politico reporter Jonathan Martin, Huntsman campaigned in a dual manner, with a style and manner suggesting moderation while his SuperPAC aired TV ads which depicted him as conservative.

It was in New Hampshire where Huntsman adopted his new "Country First" campaign slogan. The slogan was borrowed from John McCain's 2008 campaign, though the context of the slogan was different. Huntsman, who, as Governor of Utah at the time, endorsed McCain over Mitt Romney in the 2008 Republican presidential primary, had hoped McCain would return the favor; however, McCain endorsed Romney in a rally at Manchester's Manchester Central High School on January 4. Huntsman later characterized McCain's endorsement of his main rival as a "petty betrayal". He told McCain "I don't care if you support Romney, that's great – but just to have given me the dignity of waiting until after the New Hampshire primary." McCain replied, "I didn't mean to offend. I hope your family is well."

By the weekend before the January 10 primary, polls showed Huntsman in strong competition with Ron Paul for a second place showing in New Hampshire, behind front-runner Romney. A Pulse Opinion Research poll on January 4 showed Huntsman narrowly behind Paul 19–16%, while an American Research Group poll on January 7 showed Huntsman edging Paul 17–16%, though both remained well behind Romney.

Huntsman ultimately received 17% of the vote in New Hampshire for a third-place finish, although exit polls suggested he won just 10% of Republicans in a primary that was not restricted to registered Republicans.

=== South Carolina ===
Huntsman stayed in the race after his 3rd-place finish in New Hampshire, campaigning in South Carolina ahead of the January 21 primary, though he expressed that his expectations in the state were "very low", and stated that his primary goal was to "stay relevant" in the race. Nonetheless, Huntsman received the endorsement of South Carolina's largest newspaper, The State on January 15.

== Withdrawal and aftermath ==
On January 15, 2012, it was announced that Huntsman would be withdrawing from the race the next day and endorsing Mitt Romney.

After dropping out, Huntsman still received votes due to him having ballot access to every state besides Arizona and Virginia, due to failure to collect enough signatures. At the end of the GOP primaries, Huntsman placed fifth out of the ten candidates, with a total of 83,173 popular votes and 1 delegate at the Republican National Convention.

A month after dropping out of the race, Huntsman suggested there was a need for a third party in America, stating that "the real issues [were] not being addressed, and it's time that we put forward an alternative vision." Huntsman said that he would not run as a third-party presidential candidate in 2012. The Republican National Committee reacted by withdrawing an invitation for Huntsman to appear as a speaker at a Republican fundraiser in Palm Beach, Florida, in early March.

In early November 2012, just days before Barack Obama was re-elected as president, the Associated Press named Huntsman as a possible successor to Hillary Clinton as the United States secretary of state. This speculation was echoed by various media outlets, particularly after Huntsman came to the defense of United States Ambassador to the United Nations Susan Rice, describing the criticism of her response to the 2012 Benghazi attack as being "overblown".

== Endorsements ==
Politicians

United States Congress

- Richard Hanna, US Congressman (NY-24)

State officials

- Tom Ridge, Former Governor of Pennsylvania and Secretary of Homeland Security under George W. Bush
- Alan Wilson, Attorney General of South Carolina
- Henry McMaster, Former Attorney General of South Carolina

State legislators and local officials

New Hampshire

- Stewart Lamprey, Former New Hampshire State Senate President
- David Currier, Former State Senator
- Julie Brown, State Representative for Strafford District 1
- Jim Waddell, State Representative for Rockingham District 15
- Adam Schroadter, Representative for Rockingham District 12
- Rick Ladd Jr., Representative for Grafton District 5
- David Knox, Representative for Carroll District 4
- Jeff St. Cyr, Representative for Belknap District 5

South Carolina

- John E. Courson, State Senator from South Carolina's 20th District

Florida

- Jim Cason, Mayor of Coral Gables
- Ellyn Setnor Bogdanoff, State Senator from Fort Lauderdale
- Ana Navarro, Director of Immigration Policy for Former Governor Jeb Bush and Ambassador to the United Nations Human Rights Commission
Newspapers, activists and public figures

Newspapers

- The Boston Globe of Boston, Massachusetts
- The Citizen of Laconia, New Hampshire
- Concord Monitor of Concord, New Hampshire
- The Keene Sentinel of Keene, New Hampshire
- The State of Columbia, South Carolina
- Valley News of Lebanon, New Hampshire

Political activists

- Mike Campbell, South Carolina campaign chair for the Huckabee campaign in 2008
- Rob Wasinger, Campaign Manager for Brownback Campaign in 2008
- Max Eden and Michael Knowles, Founders of "Students for Daniels" which tried to encourage Mitch Daniels to run for president

Miscellaneous public figures

- Travis Pastrana, American action sports athlete
- Lew Cramer, President of Utah World Trade Center
- John J. Mack, Chairman of Morgan Stanley
- Craig Haffner, Broadway and television producer
- Jeb Bush, Jr., son of former Florida Governor Jeb Bush and nephew of former President George W. Bush

Political offices
Preceded by Olene S. Walker	Governor of Utah; January 3, 2005 – August 11, 2009	Succeeded by Gary R. Herbert
Party political offices
Preceded by Michael Leavitt	Republican Party nominee for Governor of Utah; 2004, 2008	Succeeded by Gary Herbert
Diplomatic posts
Preceded by Robert D. Orr	U.S. Ambassador to Singapore; August 11, 1992 – June 15, 1993	Succeeded by Ralph L. Boyce, Jr.
Preceded by Clark T. Randt, Jr.	U.S. Ambassador to China; August 11, 2009 – April 30, 2011	Succeeded by Gary Locke
