= Through the Eyes of Love (Ray Charles album) =

Studio album by Ray Charles
- Released: November 1972
- Genre: Rhythm and blues
- Length: 31:51
- Label: ABC/Tangerine
- Producer: Ray Charles

Ray Charles chronology
A Message from the People (1972)	Through the Eyes of Love (1972)	Jazz Number II (1973)

Through the Eyes of Love is a 1972 studio album by American rhythm and blues musician Ray Charles. It was Charles' last release in collaboration with ABC Records and his vanity label Tangerine, founded a decade earlier and has received positive reviews from critics. He followed this with a months-long break from recording and performing, and then moved to a new personal label, CrossOver Records with Decca Records. Only one single was released from this album, "I Can Make It Through the Days (But Oh Those Lonely Nights)", coming out in 1973 and charting on the Best Soul Singles.

== Reception ==
Editors at AllMusic rated this album 3 out of 5 stars and in the 2004 edition of The New Rolling Stone Album Guide, this release was rated 2.5 out of 5 stars. A review for retailers in Billboard recommended this work, calling it "one of his strongest packages of new material". Robert Christgau scored Through the Eyes of Love a B, writing that Charles' "geniuses around" on the tracks.

== Track listing ==
1. "My First Night Alone Without You" (Kin Vassy) – 3:40
2. "I Can Make It Through the Days (But Oh Those Lonely Nights)" (Ray Charles, Dee Ervin, and Ruth Robinson) – 3:52
3. "Someone to Watch Over Me" (George Gershwin and Ira Gershwin) – 3:20
4. "A Perfect Love" (Paul Williams) – 4:07
5. "If You Wouldn’t Be My Lady" (Jimmy Holliday and Eddie Reeves) – 4:10
6. "You Leave Me Breathless" (Ralph Freed and Fredrick Hollander) – 3:50
7. "Never Ending Song of Love" (Bonnie Bramlett and Delaney Bramlett) – 2:37
8. "Rainy Night in Georgia" (Tony Joe White) – 6:15

== Personnel ==
- Ray Charles – piano, vocals, engineering, production
- Joe Adams – cover art and photography
- David Braithwaite – engineering
- Sid Feller – arrangement
- Don Niehaus – graphics

== Chart performance ==
Through the Eyes of Love topped out at 183 on the Billboard 200 and reached 43 on that publication's R&B chart.

== See also ==
- List of 1972 albums
