= Jazz Number II =

Studio album by Ray Charles
- Released: January 1973
- Recorded: 1971–1972
- Studios: Charles’ Tangerine/RPM Studios, Los Angeles, CA
- Genres: Soul, jazz
- Length: 39:02
- Label: Tangerine
- Producer: Ray Charles

Ray Charles chronology
Through the Eyes of Love (1972)	Jazz Number II (1973)	Soul of the Holy Land (1973)

Jazz Number II is a 1973 album by Ray Charles. It is a collection of jazz/soul instrumentals featuring Charles on piano backed by his Big Band.

Professional ratings
Review scores
Source	Rating
Allmusic	link

== Track listing ==
1. "Our Suite" (Ray Charles, Roger Neumann) – 8:08
2. "A Pair of Threes" (Alf Clausen) – 5:32
3. "Morning of Carnival" (Luiz Bonfá, Antônio Maria) – 3:35
4. "Going Home" – 4:22
5. "Kids Are Pretty People" (Thad Jones) – 5:01
6. "Togetherness" (Jimmy Heath) – 4:04
7. "Brazilian Skies" (Teddy Edwards) – 5:10

== Personnel ==
- Ray Charles and his Orchestra
- Alf Clausen, Jimmy Heath, Roger Neumann, Teddy Edwards – arrangements

Technical

- David Braithwaite, Ray Charles – engineer
- Steve Swain – sleeve concept
