= Rick Wilson (political consultant) =

American political strategist (born 1963)

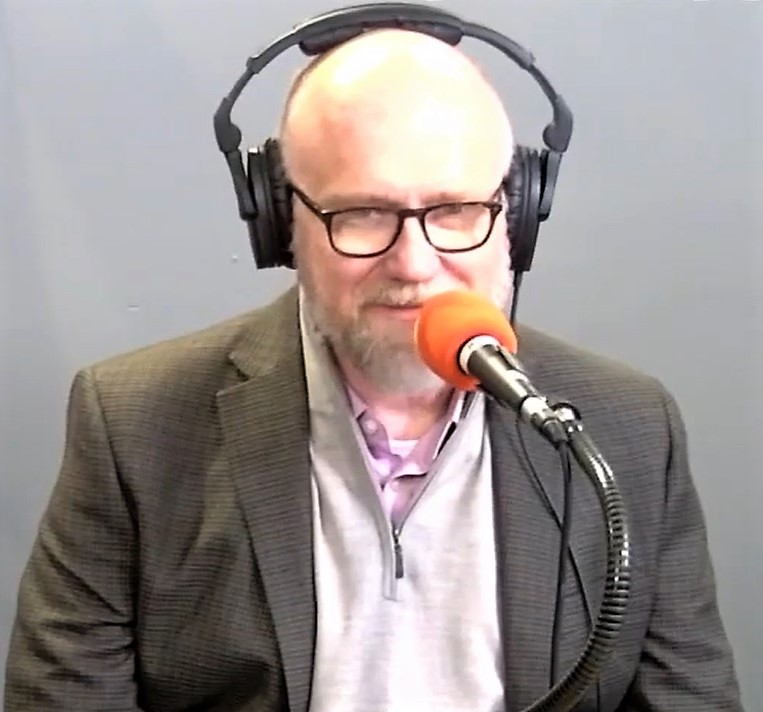
- Wilson on "Live from America", Comedy Cellar podcast in 2020
- Born: Frederick George Wilson; November 21, 1963 (age 62); Tampa, Florida, U.S.
- Education: George Washington University (BA)
- Occupations: Author, political strategist, and media consultant
- Years active: 1988–present
- Notable work: Everything Trump Touches Dies: A Republican Strategist Gets Real About the Worst President Ever (2018); Running Against the Devil: A Plot to Save America from Trump – and Democrats from Themselves (2020)
- Political party: Republican (before 2017); Independent (2017–present)
- Children: 2
- Website: therickwilson.com

Frederick George "Rick" Wilson (born November 21, 1963) is an American conservative political strategist, media consultant, pundit and author based in Florida. A former member of the Republican Party, he has produced televised political commercials for governors, U.S. Senate candidates, Super PACs, and corporations.

Wilson was a frequent guest on political panel shows during the 2016 United States presidential election, where he denounced Donald Trump and his supporters. He was later a strategist for the Evan McMullin presidential campaign. Since Trump's first election as president, Wilson has continued to be a conservative Trump critic, authoring two books: Everything Trump Touches Dies (2018) and Running Against the Devil (2020).

== Early life and education ==
Rick Wilson was born in Tampa, Florida, the son of an accountant and a housewife. According to Wilson, his parents were both "liberal Democrats" who later became Republicans. Wilson attended the University of Florida and George Washington University, where he studied philosophy.

== Career ==
Wilson entered the political arena by campaigning for Connie Mack during the 1988 Florida Senate election. Later, he served on the George H. W. Bush campaign as Florida field director.

Wilson played a significant role in the 2002 United States Senate election in Georgia, in which Saxby Chambliss was facing Democratic Senator Max Cleland, a disabled Vietnam veteran and recipient of the Silver Star. Wilson helped create an ad that attacked Cleland's voting record concerning the nascent Department of Homeland Security, flashing images of Osama bin Laden and Saddam Hussein, with some observers suggesting that it questioned Cleland's patriotism. In an interview with HuffPost, Wilson stated that he thought that "DHS was on the front line against Osama bin Laden". As Wilson reflected in 2016, "The Cleland ad was powerful because it went to his strengths [...] Everyone assumed Cleland was immune to critiques on national security issues. [...] they didn't calculate that I have no moral center when it comes to political ads, and I will destroy the innocent and the guilty". Following Cleland's death in 2021, Wilson received criticism from journalists such as Glenn Greenwald and Charlie Pierce.

In 2012, Wilson posted to Instagram an image of a cooler emblazoned with a Confederate battle flag and the words "The South Shall Rise Again", prompting allegations of racism. After public backlash, Wilson eventually deleted the post. It resurfaced in 2020 while The Lincoln Project was airing television ads attacking the public display of that flag. He had left the Republican Party following the 2016 United States presidential election, and in late 2019, co-founded The Lincoln Project, a Super PAC organized by then-current and former Republicans opposed to and working to prevent the re-election of Donald Trump in the 2020 United States presidential election.

In January 2020, Wilson appeared alongside CNN anchor Don Lemon and CNN contributor Wajahat Ali in which they discussed an exchange between United States Secretary of State Mike Pompeo and NPR reporter Mary Louise Kelly. During this segment, Wilson made comments about Trump supporters, stating they were "part of the credulous boomer rube demo". He employed the tone of Southern American English in the segment for emphasis. Wilson has been known to use extremely crude language and generalizations, such as, when criticizing supporters of Donald Trump during an interview with MSNBC leading up to the 2016 presidential election, he called them "childless single men who masturbate to anime".

In June 2020, Wilson tweeted a response to a 2012 Domino's Pizza tweet thanking White House Press Secretary Kayleigh McEnany, then a college student, for her opinion that Domino's pizza was superior to pizza from New York. In his tweet, Wilson declared, "You just killed your brand." This later prompted a response from Domino's Pizza's official Twitter account, saying "Welp. It's unfortunate that thanking a customer for a compliment back in 2012 would be viewed as political. Guess that's 2020 for ya." According to The Daily Dot, "Domino's response immediately went viral", however, they credited Wilson for not deleting the tweet "despite the unrelenting onslaught of mockery" directed at him.

== Media ==
Wilson has written numerous opinion and analysis columns for publications such as The Daily Beast, Politico, The New York Daily News, The Federalist, The Independent Journal Review, and Ricochet, and he is a frequent guest on various cable and network news outlets.

In 2018, Wilson released his first book, Everything Trump Touches Dies, in which he laments the re-alignment of the Republican Party behind Trump. The book reached number one on the New York Times nonfiction bestseller list for a week. An audiobook read by Wilson was released alongside the print version.

Wilson's second book, entitled Running Against the Devil: A Plot to Save America from Trump – and Democrats from Themselves, was published in January 2020.

Since 2020, Wilson and fellow The Daily Beast contributor Molly Jong-Fast have been the hosts of the podcast The New Abnormal.

In October 2022, Wilson launched a new podcast entitled The Enemies List, named after Richard Nixon's famous list of political enemies. Also in 2022, Wilson joined the board of directors of VoteRiders, an American non-partisan, 501(c)(3) nonprofit organization whose mission is to ensure that all U.S. citizens over 18 years of age are able to exercise their right to vote.

== Personal life ==
Wilson lives in Tallahassee, Florida. He has two children.
