= John Weaver (political consultant) =

American political consultant (born c. 1959)

- Born: c. 1959 (age 66–67); Kermit, Texas, U.S.
- Education: Texas A&M University
- Political party: Republican
- Spouse: Angela Hession (m. 2007)
- Children: 2

John Weaver (born circa 1959) is an American political consultant. He worked on the John McCain presidential campaigns of 2000 and 2008. In between, he worked for a time for the Democratic Congressional Campaign Committee. He was also the chief strategist for Jon Huntsman Jr's 2012 presidential campaign, and later, the 2016 presidential campaign of John Kasich.

In 2019, he co-founded The Lincoln Project, a super PAC opposed to the re-election of President Donald Trump in 2020. He resigned from the organization in January 2021, after he was accused of online harassment by 21 men as well as offering personal and professional favors in exchange for sex to at least 10 of the men.

== Early life and education ==
Weaver was born in Kermit, Texas; he studied at Texas A&M University, where he worked at The Battalion, the student newspaper.

== Career in politics ==
=== Texas politics ===
Weaver worked for Republican congressmen Phil Gramm and Tom Loeffler, as well as Bill Clements. Weaver was executive director of the Republican Party of Texas (in which capacity he worked with Rick Perry); was a Texas leader in George H. W. Bush's campaigns for president in 1988 and in 1992; and worked for Gramm in his unsuccessful 1996 bid for the presidency.

=== John McCain adviser ===
For a decade, Weaver was a senior adviser to Senator John McCain of Arizona. At one point he was described as one of McCain's "closest advisers" and "an architect of McCain's 'Straight Talk Express.'" Later on, Meghan McCain said that Weaver had become despised by the Senator and his entire family starting in 2008. He left the McCain campaign in July 2007, along with campaign manager Terry Nelson, political director Rob Jesmer, and deputy campaign manager Reed Galen, following several consecutive months of poor fund-raising.

In 2004, Weaver appeared in the documentary film (based on the 2003 book of the same name) Bush's Brain: How Karl Rove Made George W. Bush Presidential, which alleges that Karl Rove, former campaign manager and Deputy White House Chief of Staff to President George W. Bush, was behind a South Carolina push poll during the 2000 Republican primary that used racist innuendo to undermine support for McCain by asking voters: "Would you be more likely or less likely to vote for John McCain for president if you knew he had fathered an illegitimate black child?" Rove has always steadfastly denied that he had any involvement whatsoever in that caper, saying that the source was a professor at Bob Jones University.

In 2008, Weaver made headlines within the Beltway during the John McCain lobbyist controversy when some American media personalities speculated about his involvement in an article published by The New York Times which questioned the propriety of McCain's relationship with lobbyist Vicki Iseman. Weaver denied speaking to the paper without the campaign's approval.

Weaver and Mark Salter were viewed at one time as two of the aides who were closest to McCain, although, as mentioned, Meghan McCain wrote that Weaver had been reviled by John McCain and his family since 2008, saying that Weaver had "betrayed" her father.

=== Jon Huntsman and John Kasich aide ===
Weaver served as the chief strategist for Jon Huntsman's 2012 presidential campaign. After Mitt Romney's defeat in the November 2012 general election, Weaver tweeted, "In our party, intolerance can no longer be tolerated".

By June 2015, Weaver had been hired to work on the prospective presidential campaign of Ohio Governor John Kasich. He became the campaign's chief strategist. Less than two weeks before the 2016 South Carolina primary, Weaver said, "We want to do well enough to keep Jeb [Bush] from doing well [in South Carolina]. If we knock him out of the race, it's a victory." Ultimately, according to The New York Times, Kasich's message "never caught on" and he "found himself stuck in fourth place in a three-man race." Kasich suspended his campaign in May 2016, leaving Donald Trump as the only candidate remaining in the Republican field and hence the party's presumptive nominee.

=== The Lincoln Project ===
In 2019, Weaver and fellow Republican operatives George Conway, Steve Schmidt, and Rick Wilson wrote an op-ed published in The New York Times, calling for Donald Trump to be defeated in the 2020 presidential election. The four wrote, "The president and his enablers have replaced conservatism with an empty faith led by a bogus prophet." Weaver co-founded The Lincoln Project, a super PAC organized by current and former Republican operatives opposed to the re-election of Donald Trump in 2020.

Weaver took a medical leave of absence from The Lincoln Project in the summer of 2020 and did not return to the organization.

=== Russia ===
In April 2019, Weaver signed a six-month $350,000 contract with a subsidiary of Rosatom, a Russian state corporation that specializes in nuclear energy, to lobby on “sanctions or other restrictions in the area of atomic (nuclear) energy, trade or cooperation involving in any way the Russian Federation” and submitted a FARA registration form. However, after a report of the contract was published, Weaver cancelled the contract.

=== Sexual harassment allegations ===
In January 2021, responding to a magazine article accusing him of sexual misconduct spanning a period of years, Weaver acknowledged having sent inappropriate, unsolicited sexual messages to 21 men, for which he apologized. According to The New York Times, Weaver offered young men professional support in exchange for sex; that report also accused him of cultivating a non-sexual online relationship with a 14-year-old boy and then engaging in "sexual banter" with him after his 18th birthday. Speaking to Axios, Weaver said, "The truth is that I'm gay and that I have a wife and two kids who I love. My inability to reconcile those two truths has led to this agonizing place." Following the revelations, The Lincoln Project said "John's statement speaks for itself". It later issued a follow-up describing him as "a predator, a liar, and an abuser", and denouncing his "deplorable and predatory behavior". In February 2021, The Lincoln Project announced plans for an external investigation to review Weaver's conduct during his tenure with the group.

== Personal life ==
Weaver's first marriage ended in 2001 or 2002. Weaver married his second wife, Angela Hession, in 2007. They have two children together. In 2002, he was diagnosed with leukemia.
