= Cooper Union speech =

1860 speech by Abraham Lincoln

- Part of 1860 United States presidential election
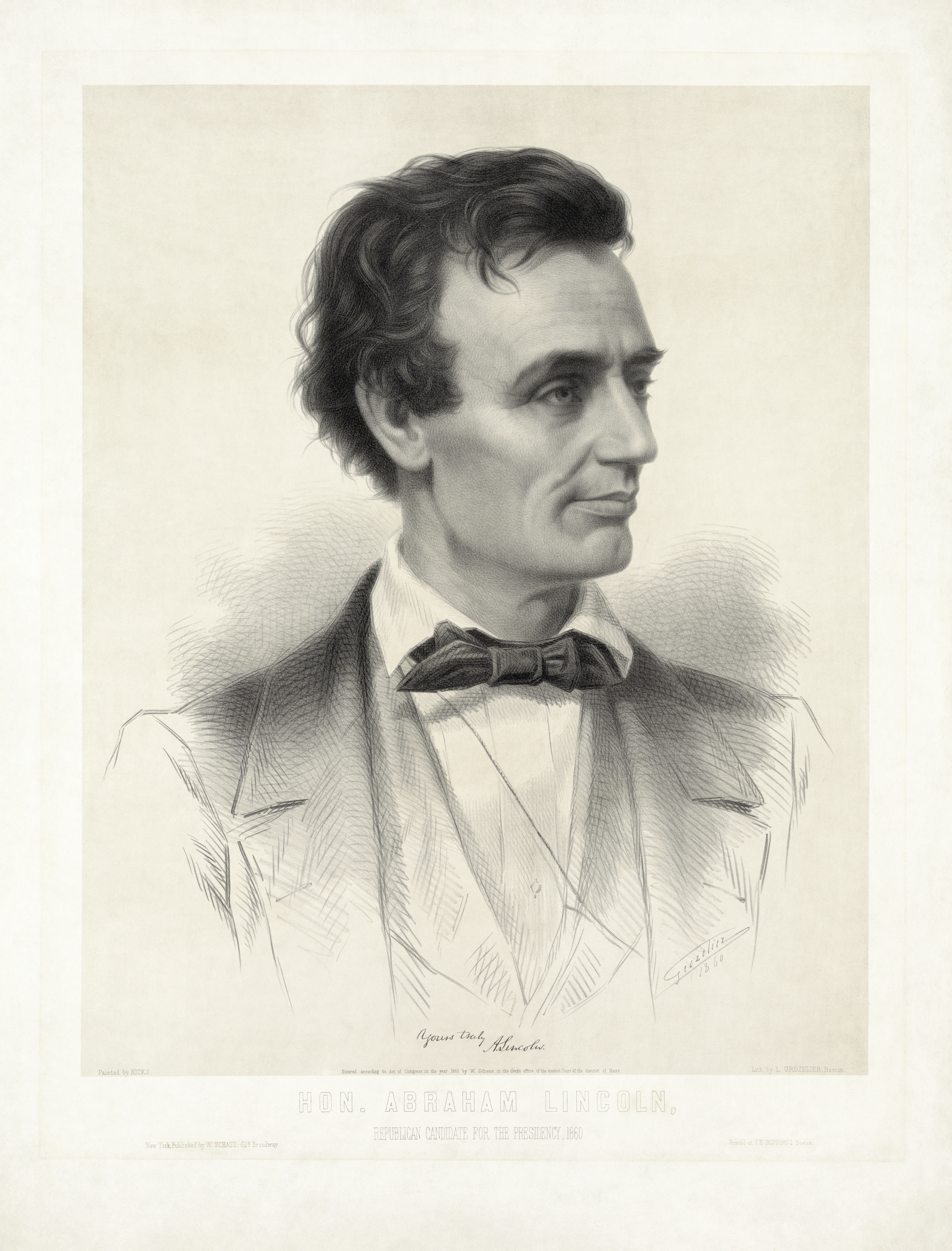
- 1860 campaign lithograph of Abraham Lincoln by Leopold Grozelier, depicting him clean-shaven around the time of the address.
- Date: February 27, 1860
- Location: The Cooper Institute, Manhattan, New York City, U.S.
- Participants: Abraham Lincoln (Keynote speaker); David Wilmot (Ex-Congressman, attendee); William Cullen Bryant (Introduction presenter)
- Outcome: Secured Lincoln's national prominence in the Republican Party; Pivotal momentum toward his 1860 presidential nomination; Widely printed and distributed globally as an anti-slavery tract

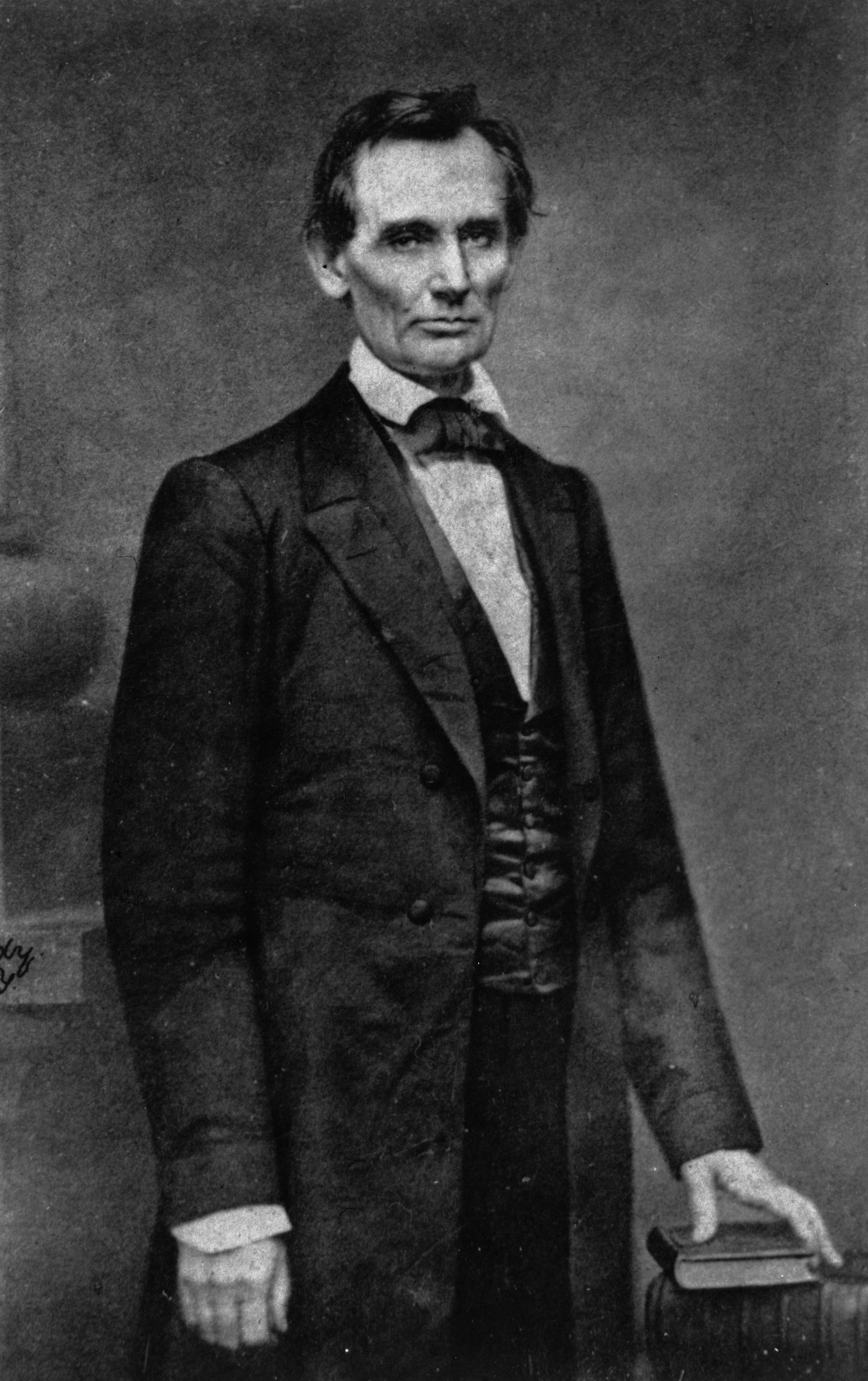
Photo of Abraham Lincoln taken February 27, 1860 in New York City by Mathew Brady, the day of his famous Cooper Union speech

The Cooper Union speech or address, known at the time as the Cooper Institute speech, was delivered by Abraham Lincoln on February 27, 1860, at Cooper Union, in New York City. Lincoln was not yet the Republican nominee for the presidency, as the convention was scheduled for May. It is considered one of his most important speeches. Some historians have argued that the speech was responsible for his victory in the presidential election later that year.

In the speech, Lincoln elaborated his views on slavery by affirming that he did not wish it to be expanded into the western territories and claiming that the Founding Fathers would agree with this position. The journalist Robert J. McNamara wrote, "Lincoln's Cooper Union speech was one of his longest, at more than 7,000 words. And it is not one of his speeches with passages that are often quoted. Yet, due to the careful research and Lincoln's forceful argument, it was stunningly effective."

Horace Greeley's New-York Tribune hailed it as "one of the most happiest and most convincing political arguments ever made in this City.... No man ever made such an impression on his first appeal to a New-York audience."

== Background ==
As 1860 dawned, Lincoln's political tides were turning. Although he had lost a chance at a Senate seat in the 1858 Illinois Senate elections, he now eyed the presidency. However, it was expected that "the office should seek the man", and Lincoln refrained from announcing his candidacy. In February 1860, he was invited to speak at Henry Ward Beecher's Plymouth Church in Brooklyn, New York, an invitation he eagerly accepted. Having not spoken in the East before, Lincoln was eager to make a good impression. He had a new suit fitted (at the cost of $100 (about $4,000 in current dollars)) and went to great pains to write a sophisticated and well-researched speech. His new suit was of little impact, as the suit still fit the massive and lanky Lincoln poorly. But his speech "was a masterful exploration of the political paths open to the nation".

By the time Lincoln got to New York, he had learned that the speech would instead be sponsored by the Young Men's Central Republican Union and would now be given at the eponymous Cooper Union. Lincoln hurriedly rewrote his speech for a less religious audience. The night before the speech, he painstakingly "review[ed] and typesett[ed]" it with the aid of journalist acquaintances.

The new audience proved to be very useful for Lincoln, as it now included Horace Greeley, who had the power to act as a presidential king-maker and was on a campaign to prevent the presidential nomination of his longtime friend, and now sworn rival, William H. Seward.

Lincoln was the third speaker in a series, going after Frank Blair (who would later serve as an advisor to Lincoln) and abolitionist Cassius M. Clay. New York Evening Post editor William Cullen Bryant provided a warm introduction. Lincoln's ungainly appearance, ill-fitting suit, and shrill voice gave an initially poor impression to listeners, but he soon warmed up, and his oratory improved. The clarity and logic of his speech quickly wiped away any doubts the audience had.

== Summary ==
Lincoln's speech has three major parts, each building towards his conclusion. The first part concerns the founders and the legal positions they supported on the question of slavery in the territories. The second part is addressed to the voters of the Southern states by clarifying the issues between Republicans and Democrats. He rebukes claims made by the Democrats that they are "conservative", arguing instead that the Republicans' position on slavery is in fact the "conservative" policy, as Lincoln claims it coincides with the views of the American founding fathers, who he said opposed slavery. By supporting slavery, Lincoln claims that the Democrats are in opposition to the teachings of the founding fathers and "reject, and scout, and spit upon that old policy, and insist upon substituting something new." The final section is addressed to Republicans.

In the first section, in response to a statement by Illinois Democrat Stephen A. Douglas, Lincoln asks rhetorically, "What is the frame of government under which we live?" He answers that it "must be: 'The Constitution of the United States.'" From there, he begins his reasoning on why the federal government can regulate slavery in the federal territories (but not states), especially resting on the character of the founders, and how they thought of slavery:

The sum of the whole is, that of our thirty-nine fathers who framed the original Constitution, twenty-one – a clear majority of the whole – certainly understood that no proper division of local from federal authority, nor any part of the Constitution, forbade the Federal Government to control slavery in the federal territories ...

In the second part, in which he uses the prosopopoeia of a mock debate between Republicans and the South, Lincoln denies that Republicans are a "sectional" party, representing only the North and helping to incite slave rebellions. He rebukes the Southern Democrats' accusation that Republicans helped John Brown by saying, "John Brown was no Republican; and you have failed to implicate a single Republican in his Harper's Ferry enterprise." He addressed the single-mindedness of the Southern Democrats:

Your purpose, then, plainly stated, is that you will destroy the Government, unless you be allowed to construe and enforce the Constitution as you please, on all points in dispute between you and us. You will rule or ruin in all events.

He also tried to show that the Southern Democrats' demand to secede from the Union if a Republican were to be elected president was like armed robbery: "the threat of destruction to the Union, to extort my vote, can scarcely be distinguished in principle" from that of a robber.

But you will not abide the election of a Republican president! In that supposed event, You say, you will destroy the Union; and then, you say, the great crime of having destroyed it will be upon us! A highwayman holds a pistol to my ear, and mutters through his teeth, "Stand and deliver, or I shall kill you, and then you will be a murderer!"

The third section, addressed to fellow Republicans, encourages level-headed thinking and cool actions, doing "nothing through passion and ill temper":

We must not only let them alone, but we must somehow, convince them that we do let them alone. This, we know by experience, is no easy task. We have been so trying to convince them from the very beginning of our organization, but with no success. In all our platforms and speeches we have constantly protested our purpose to let them alone; but this has had no tendency to convince them.

Lincoln states that the only thing that will convince the Southerners is to "cease to call slavery wrong, and join them in calling it right", supporting all their runaway slave laws and the expansion of slavery. He ends by saying that Republicans, if they cannot end slavery where it exists, must fight through their votes to prevent its expansion. He ends with a call to duty:

Neither let us be slandered from our duty by false accusations against us, nor frightened from it by menaces of destruction to the Government nor of dungeons to ourselves. Let us have faith that right makes might, and in that faith, let us, to the end, dare to do our duty as we understand it.

== Key excerpts ==
=== Section addressed to "Mr. President and fellow citizens of New York" ===
In his speech last autumn, at Columbus, Ohio, as reported in The New York Times, Senator Douglas said: "Our fathers, when they framed the Government under which we live, understood this question just as well, and even better than we do now." I fully endorse this, and I adopt it as a text for this discourse. I so adopt it because it furnishes a precise and an agreed starting point for a discussion between Republicans and that wing of the Democracy headed by Senator Douglas. It simply leaves the inquiry: "What was the understanding those fathers had of the question mentioned?" ... The sum of the whole is, that of our thirty-nine fathers who framed the original Constitution, twenty-one—a clear majority of the whole—certainly understood that no proper division of local from federal authority, nor any part of the Constitution, forbade the Federal Government to control slavery in the federal territories; while all the rest probably had the same understanding. Such, unquestionably, was the understanding of our fathers who framed the original Constitution ...

It is surely safe to assume that the thirty-nine framers of the original Constitution, and the seventy-six members of the Congress which framed the amendments thereto, taken together, do certainly include those who may be fairly called "our fathers who framed the Government under which we live". And so assuming, I defy any man to show that any one of them ever, in his whole life, declared that, in his understanding, any proper division of local from federal authority, or any part of the Constitution, forbade the Federal Government to control as to slavery in the federal territories. I go a step further. I defy any one to show that any living man in the whole world ever did, prior to the beginning of the present century, (and I might almost say prior to the beginning of the last half of the present century,) declare that, in his understanding, any proper division of local from federal authority, or any part of the Constitution, forbade the Federal Government to control as to slavery in the federal territories. To those who now so declare, I give, not only "our fathers who framed the Government under which we live", but with them all other living men within the century in which it was framed, among whom to search, and they shall not be able to find the evidence of a single man agreeing with them. ...

I do not mean to say we are bound to follow implicitly in whatever our fathers did. To do so, would be to discard all the lights of current experience—to reject all progress—all improvement. What I do say is, that if we would supplant the opinions and policy of our fathers in any case, we should do so upon evidence so conclusive, and argument so clear, that even their great authority, fairly considered and weighed, cannot stand; and most surely not in a case whereof we ourselves declare they understood the question better than we. ...

If any man at this day sincerely believes that a proper division of local from federal authority, or any part of the Constitution, forbids the Federal Government to control as to slavery in the federal territories, he is right to say so, and to enforce his position by all truthful evidence and fair argument which he can. But he has no right to mislead others, who have less access to history, and less leisure to study it, into the false belief that "our fathers who framed the Government under which we live" were of the same opinion—thus substituting falsehood and deception for truthful evidence and fair argument. If any man at this day sincerely believes "our fathers who framed the Government under which we live", used and applied principles, in other cases, which ought to have led them to understand that a proper division of local from federal authority or some part of the Constitution, forbids the Federal Government to control as to slavery in the federal territories, he is right to say so. But he should, at the same time, brave the responsibility of declaring that, in his opinion, he understands their principles better than they did themselves; and especially should he not shirk that responsibility by asserting that they "understood the question just as well, and even better, than we do now."

But enough! Let all who believe that "our fathers, who framed the Government under which we live, understood this question just as well, and even better, than we do now", speak as they spoke, and act as they acted upon it. This is all Republicans ask—all Republicans desire—in relation to slavery. As those fathers marked it, so let it be again marked, as an evil not to be extended, but to be tolerated and protected only because of and so far as its actual presence among us makes that toleration and protection a necessity. Let all the guarantees those fathers gave it, be, not grudgingly, but fully and fairly, maintained. For this Republicans contend, and with this, so far as I know or believe, they will be content.

=== Section addressed "to the Southern people" ===
But you say you are conservative—eminently conservative—while we are revolutionary, destructive, or something of the sort. What is conservatism? Is it not adherence to the old and tried, against the new and untried? We stick to, contend for, the identical old policy on the point in controversy which was adopted by "our fathers who framed the Government under which we live"; while you with one accord reject, and scout, and spit upon that old policy, and insist upon substituting something new. True, you disagree among yourselves as to what that substitute shall be. You are divided into new propositions and plans, but you are unanimous in rejecting and denouncing the old policy of the fathers. Some of you are for reviving the foreign slave trade; some for a Congressional Slave-Code for the Territories; some for Congress forbidding the Territories to prohibit Slavery within their limits; some for maintaining Slavery in the Territories through the judiciary; some for the "gur-reat pur-rinciple" that "if one man would enslave another, no third man should object", fantastically called "Popular Sovereignty"; but never a man among you is in favor of federal prohibition of slavery in federal territories, according to the practice of "our fathers who framed the Government under which we live". Not one of all your various plans can show a precedent or an advocate in the century within which our Government originated. Consider, then, whether your claim of conservatism for yourselves and your charge of destructiveness against us, are based on the clearest and stable foundations.

...

Human action can be modified to some extent, but human nature cannot be changed. There are judgment and a feeling against slavery in this nation, which cast at least a million and a half of votes. You cannot destroy that judgment and feeling—that sentiment—by breaking up the political organization which rallies around it. You can scarcely scatter and disperse an army which has been formed into order in the face of your heaviest fire; but if you could, how much would you gain by forcing the sentiment which created it out of the peaceful channel of the ballot-box, into some other channel? ...

When you make these declarations, you have a specific and well-understood allusion to an assumed Constitutional right of yours, to take slaves into the federal territories, and to hold them there as property. But no such right is specifically written in the Constitution. That instrument is literally silent about any such right. We, on the contrary, deny that such a right has any existence in the Constitution, even by implication. ...

Your purpose, then, plainly stated, is that you will destroy the Government, unless you be allowed to construe and enforce the Constitution as you please, on all points in dispute between you and us. You will rule or ruin in all events. ...

An inspection of the Constitution will show that the right of property in a slave is not "distinctly and expressly affirmed" in it. ...

But you will not abide the election of a Republican president! In that supposed event, you say, you will destroy the Union; and then, you say, the great crime of having destroyed it will be upon us! That is cool. A highwayman holds a pistol to my ear, and mutters through his teeth, "Stand and deliver, or I shall kill you, and then you will be a murderer!" To be sure, what the robber demanded of me—my money—was my own; and I had a clear right to keep it; but it was no more my own than my vote is my own; and the threat of death to me, to extort my money, and the threat of destruction to the Union, to extort my vote, can scarcely be distinguished in principle.

...

=== Section addressed "to Republicans" ===
These natural, and apparently adequate means all failing, what will convince them? This, and this only: cease to call slavery wrong, and join them in calling it right. And this must be done thoroughly - done in acts as well as in words. Silence will not be tolerated - we must place ourselves avowedly with them. Senator Douglas' new sedition law must be enacted and enforced, suppressing all declarations that slavery is wrong, whether made in politics, in presses, in pulpits, or in private. We must arrest and return their fugitive slaves with greedy pleasure. We must pull down our Free State constitutions. The whole atmosphere must be disinfected from all taint of opposition to slavery, before they will cease to believe that all their troubles proceed from us. ...

Wrong as we think slavery is, we can yet afford to let it alone where it is, because that much is due to the necessity arising from its actual presence in the nation; but can we, while our votes will prevent it, allow it to spread into the National Territories, and to overrun us here in these Free States? If our sense of duty forbids this, then let us stand by our duty, fearlessly and effectively. Let us be diverted by none of those sophistical contrivances wherewith we are so industriously plied and belabored—contrivances such as groping for some middle ground between the right and the wrong, vain as the search for a man who should be neither a living man nor a dead man — such as a policy of "don't care" on a question about which all true men do care — such as Union appeals beseeching true Union men to yield to Disunionists, reversing the divine rule, and calling, not the sinners, but the righteous to repentance — such as invocations to Washington, imploring men to unsay what Washington said, and undo what Washington did. ...

Neither let us be slandered from our duty by false accusations against us nor frightened from it by menaces of destruction to the Government nor of dungeons to ourselves. Let us have faith that right makes might, and in that faith, let us, to the end, dare to do our duty as we understand it.

== Legacy ==
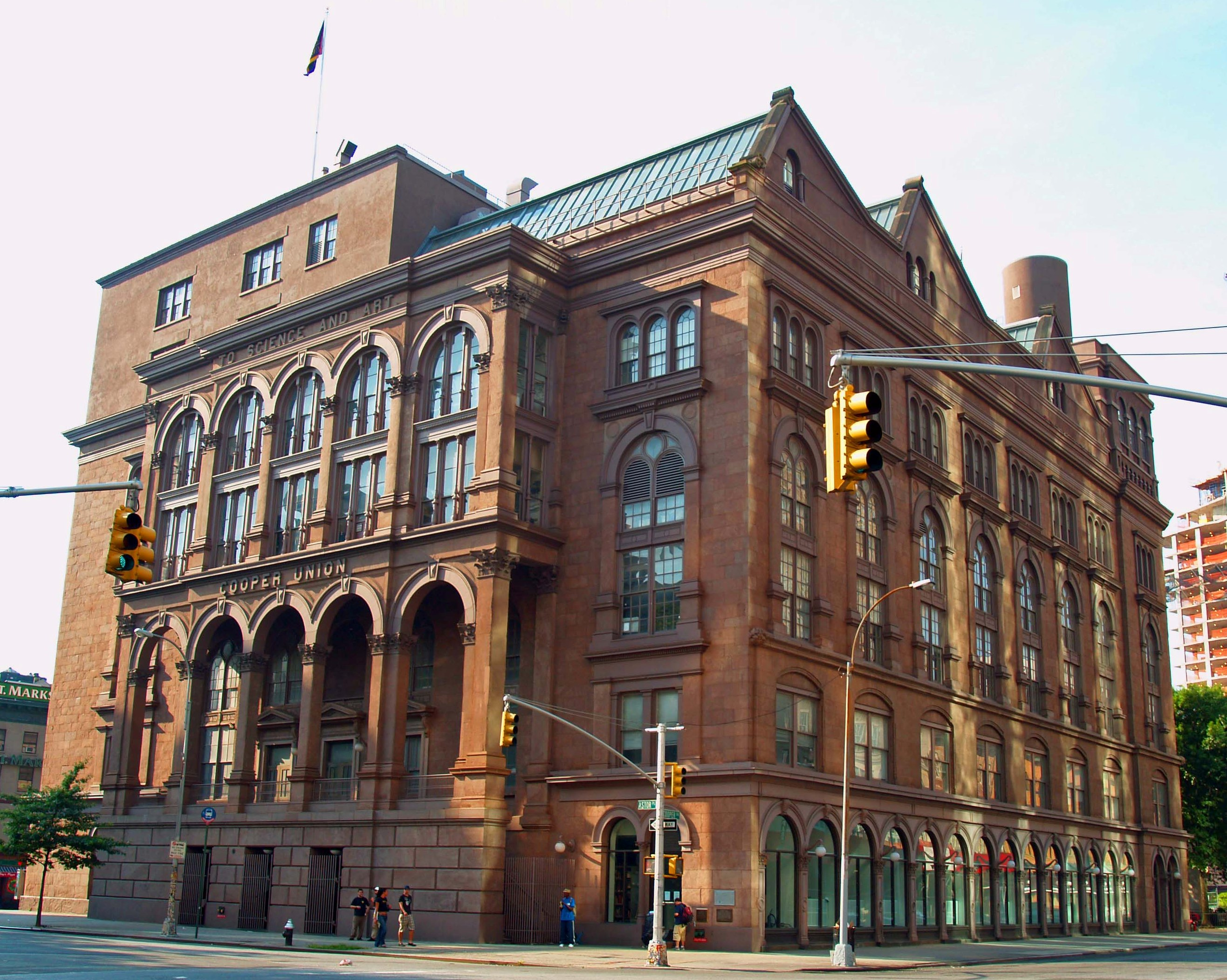
The Cooper Union (2007)

Lincoln scholar Harold Holzer called the Cooper Union address "Lincoln's watershed, the event that transformed him from a regional leader into a national phenomenon. Here the politician known as a frontier debater and chronic jokester introduced a new oratorical style: informed by history, suffused with moral certainty, and marked by lawyerly precision."

Holzer wrote about Lincoln's speech in New York City:

Had Abraham Lincoln failed at his do-or-die debut in New York, he would never have won his party's presidential nomination three months later, not to mention election to the White House that November. Such was the impact of a triumph in the nation's media capital. Had he stumbled, none of the challenges that roiled his presidency would ever have tested his iron will....

Moreover, had Lincoln failed in New York, few might recognize today the nation he went on to defend and rededicate. It can be argued that without Cooper Union, hence without Lincoln at the helm, the United States might be remembered today as a failed experiment that fractured into a North American Balkans.

Instead, Abraham Lincoln did triumph in New York. He delivered a learned, witty, and exquisitely reasoned address that electrified his elite audience and, more important, reverberated in newspapers and pamphlets alike until it reached tens of thousands of Republican voters across the North. He had arrived at Cooper Union a politician with more defeats than victories, but he departed politically reborn....

At the Cooper Union, Lincoln became more than a regional curiosity. He became a national leader.

Writing about his visit to Lincoln's speech place at Cooper Union and the meaning of this place for Lincoln's career and legacy, Holzer states that "only at the Great Hall of Cooper Union can audiences so easily inhale Lincoln's presence too—there to imagine not the dying but the living man, not the bearded icon of myth but the clean-shaven, fresh-voiced political original who conquered all New York here on the way to the White House and immortality."

David Herbert Donald considers the speech to be a masterful political move. Delivered in the home state of William H. Seward, who was the favored candidate for the 1860 election, and attended by Greeley, now an enemy of Seward, the speech put Lincoln in the ideal position to challenge for the nomination. Lincoln used the speech to show that the Republican party was a party of moderates, not crazed fanatics as the South and Democrats claimed. Afterwards, Lincoln was in much demand for speaking engagements. He travelled on a tour of New Hampshire, Connecticut and Rhode Island, repeating his arguments of the speech. The speech may have been a critical factor in ensuring his election.
