= Veepstakes 2008 =

Veepstakes 2008 may refer to:

- 2008 Democratic Party vice presidential candidate selection
- 2008 Republican Party vice presidential candidate selection
