= 2008 Veepstakes =

2008 Veepstakes may refer to:

- 2008 Democratic Party vice presidential candidate selection
- 2008 Republican Party vice presidential candidate selection
