= 2008 Republican Party vice presidential candidate selection =

2008 Republican vice presidential nomination
- August 29, 2008
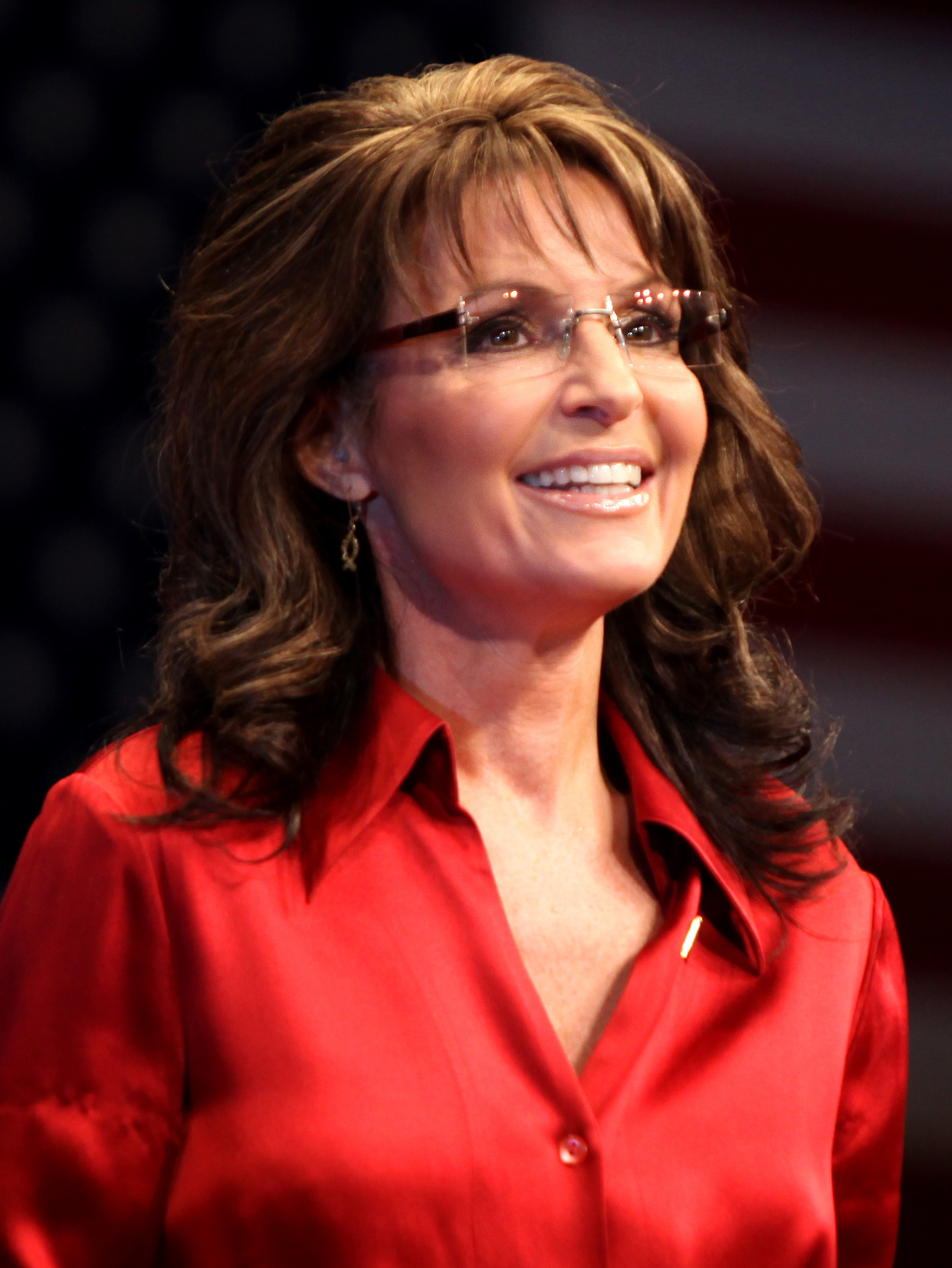
Nominee	Sarah Palin
Home state	Alaska
Previous Vice Presidential nominee
Dick Cheney
Vice Presidential nominee
Sarah Palin

On March 4, 2008, Senator John McCain of Arizona won the 2008 nomination by the Republican Party for President of the United States, and became the presumptive nominee of the party. McCain held an event with Alaska governor Sarah Palin, revealing her as his vice presidential running mate on August 29, 2008, a date which coincided both with McCain's 72nd birthday and the Palins' 20th wedding anniversary, at the Ervin J. Nutter Center in Dayton, Ohio, the day after Barack Obama's acceptance speech. If elected, she would have been the first vice president from Alaska and outside the mainland United States, and the first female vice president, but the feat would later be accomplished by Kamala Harris in 2020. The McCain–Palin ticket ultimately lost to the Obama–Biden ticket in the 2008 presidential election, and Palin returned to the governorship following the campaign but later resigned the following year.

== Selection process ==
Sarah Palin was the GOP choice for Vice President. At a speech in Norfolk, Virginia, McCain told supporters that regional considerations would have less bearing on his decision than the candidate's perceived ability to take over the office of the presidency–and the candidate's "values, principles, philosophy, and priorities." One factor that McCain had to consider, more so than did his opponent, was age. Had McCain won in 2008, he would have (on January 20, 2009) been the oldest person to assume the Presidency in U.S. history at initial ascension to office, being 72 years old. Other factors to be considered were shoring up the conservative base, choosing someone with executive experience, expertise in domestic policy (to complement McCain's foreign policy focus), and electoral college calculations.

McCain initially wished to choose Lieberman, his close friend and the 2000 Democratic vice presidential nominee, as his running mate; however, Lieberman's liberal record (voting with Democrats 86.9% of the time in the 110th Congress) and pro-choice stance led McCain's aides to veto the choice. Close aide Mark Salter preferred Pawlenty, while the campaign manager Steve Schmidt preferred Palin. By picking Palin, Schmidt argued, McCain could snatch the "change" mantle away from Obama. McCain, rejecting 'safer' choices such as Pawlenty or Romney, instead chose Palin as his running mate.

=== Shortlist ===
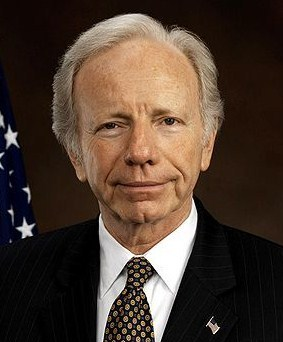
Democratic (Note: Lieberman became an independent in 2006.) Senator
Joe Lieberman
from Connecticut
(1989–2013)

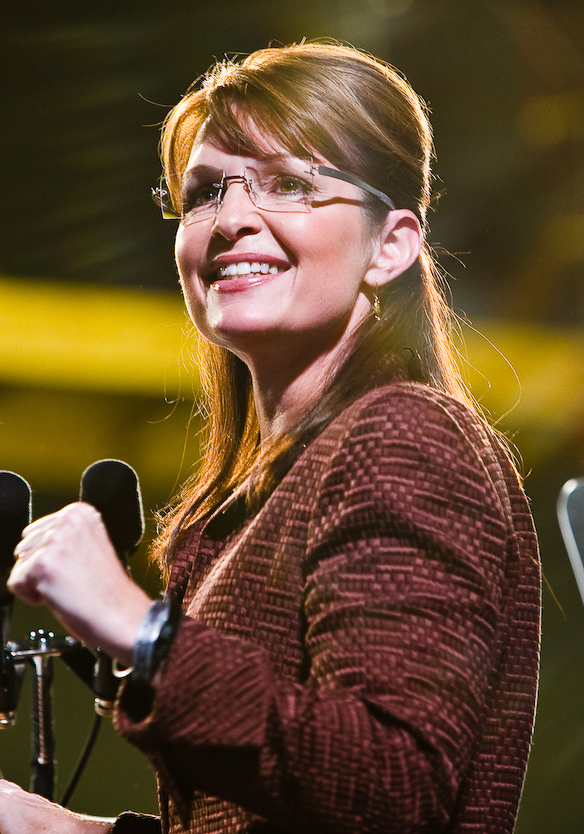
Governor
Sarah Palin
of Alaska
(2006–2009)

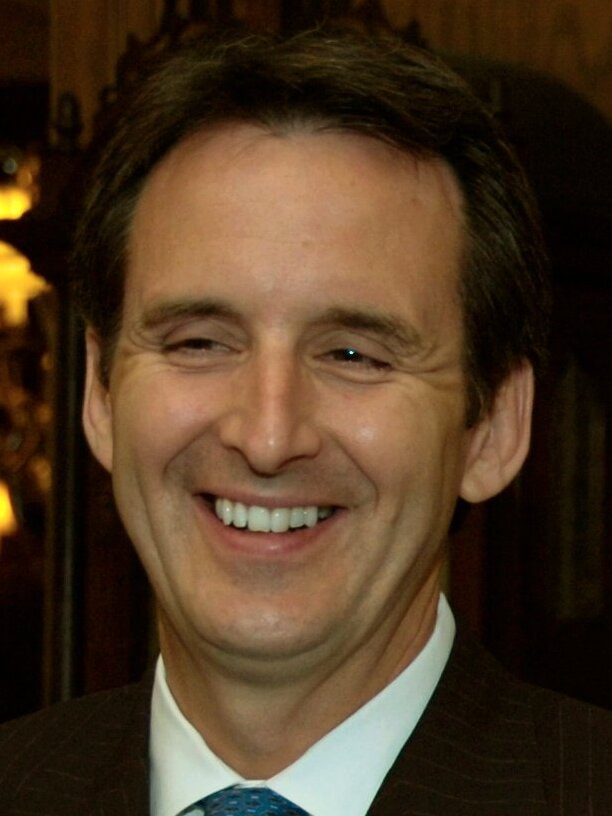
Governor
Tim Pawlenty
of Minnesota
(2003–2011)

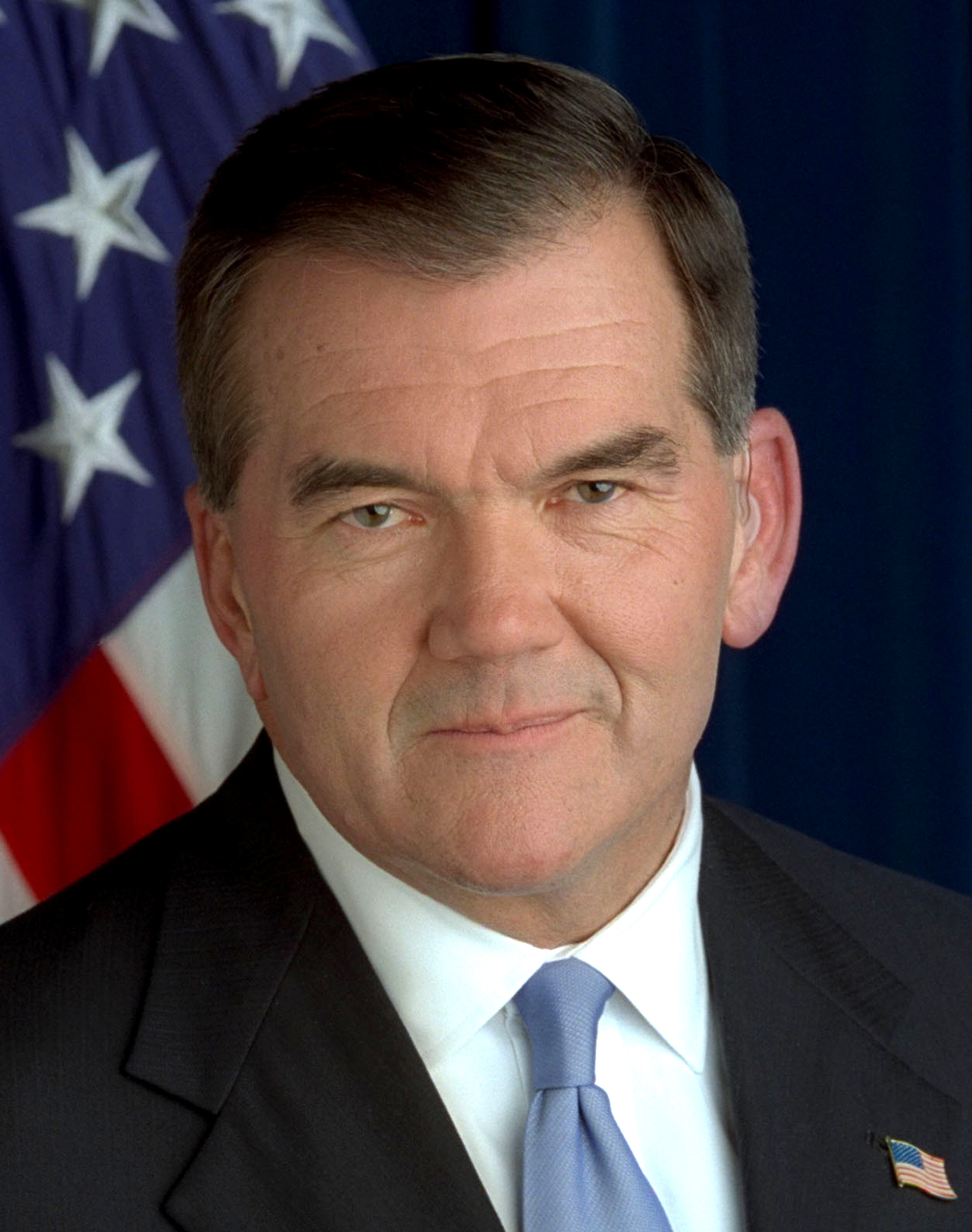
Former Secretary of Homeland Security
Tom Ridge
from Pennsylvania
(2001–2005)

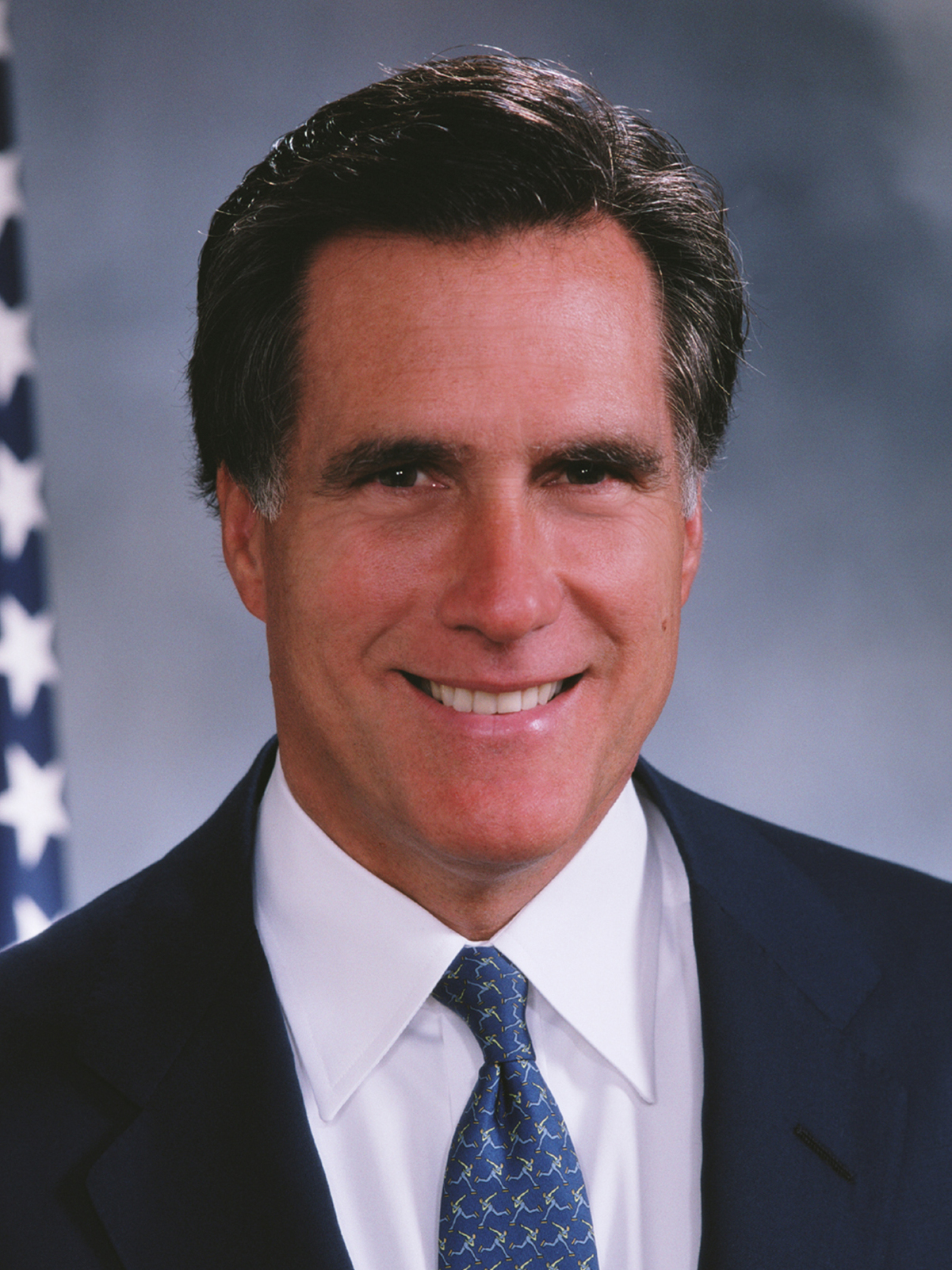
Former Governor
Mitt Romney
of Massachusetts
(2003–2007)

== Media speculation on John McCain's possible running-mates ==
After his selection by Republican primary voters as presumptive presidential nominee, news sources and political pundits began to speculate on whom McCain would or should choose, based on the candidates' ability to enhance the Republican ticket, personality (ability to work well with McCain), and preparedness for assuming the office of the presidency. The Associated Press reported that McCain had composed a list of 20 or so potential running mates. Over two dozen names had been offered as viable potential running mates by The Kansas City Star, The Salt Lake Tribune, The New York Sun, The Indianapolis Star, the St. Louis Post-Dispatch, The Times of India, The Globe and Mail, and CBS News.This list includes both names that had been mentioned in several sources and some much less likely candidates:

=== Members of Congress ===
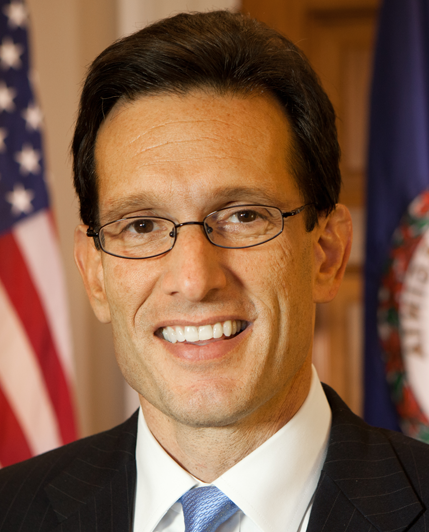
Representative
Eric Cantor
from Virginia
(2001–2014)

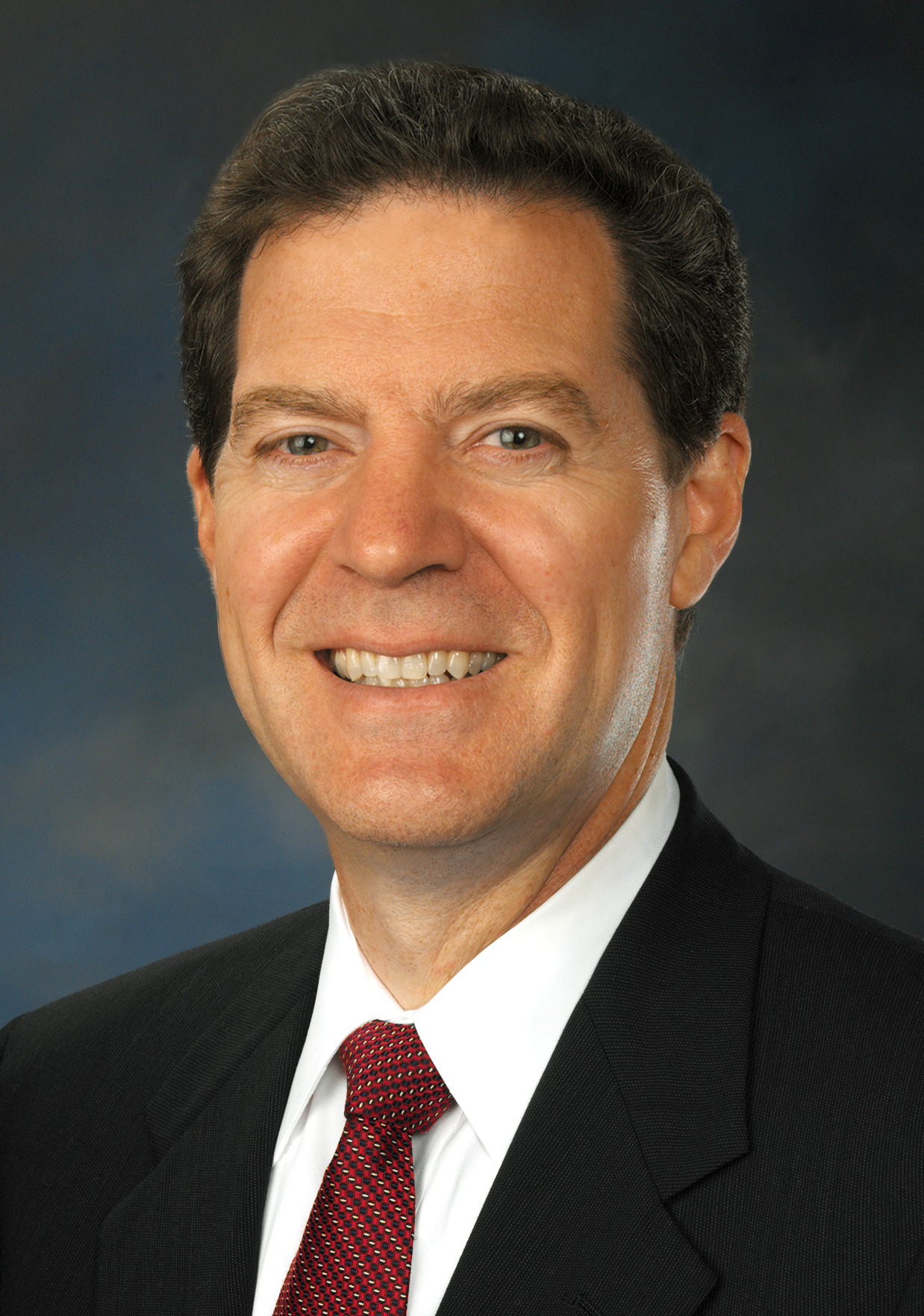
Senator
Sam Brownback
from Kansas
(1996–2011)

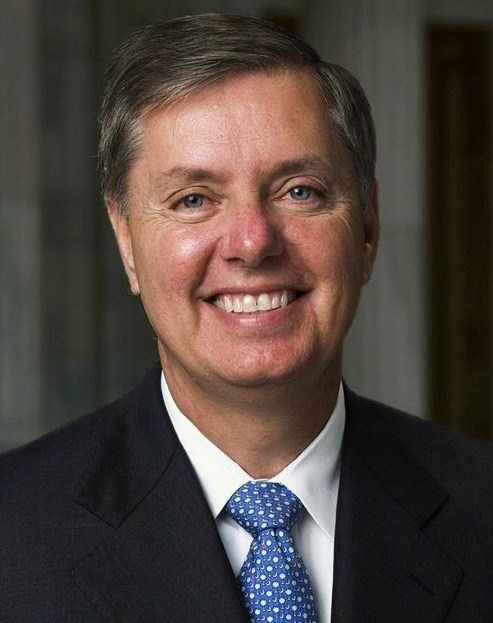
Senator
Lindsey Graham
from South Carolina
(2003–2026)

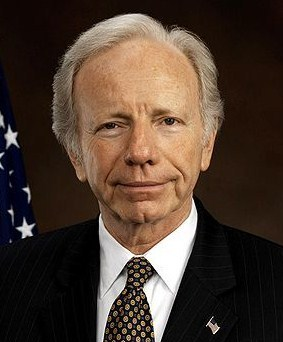
Democratic Senator
Joe Lieberman
from Connecticut
(1989–2013)

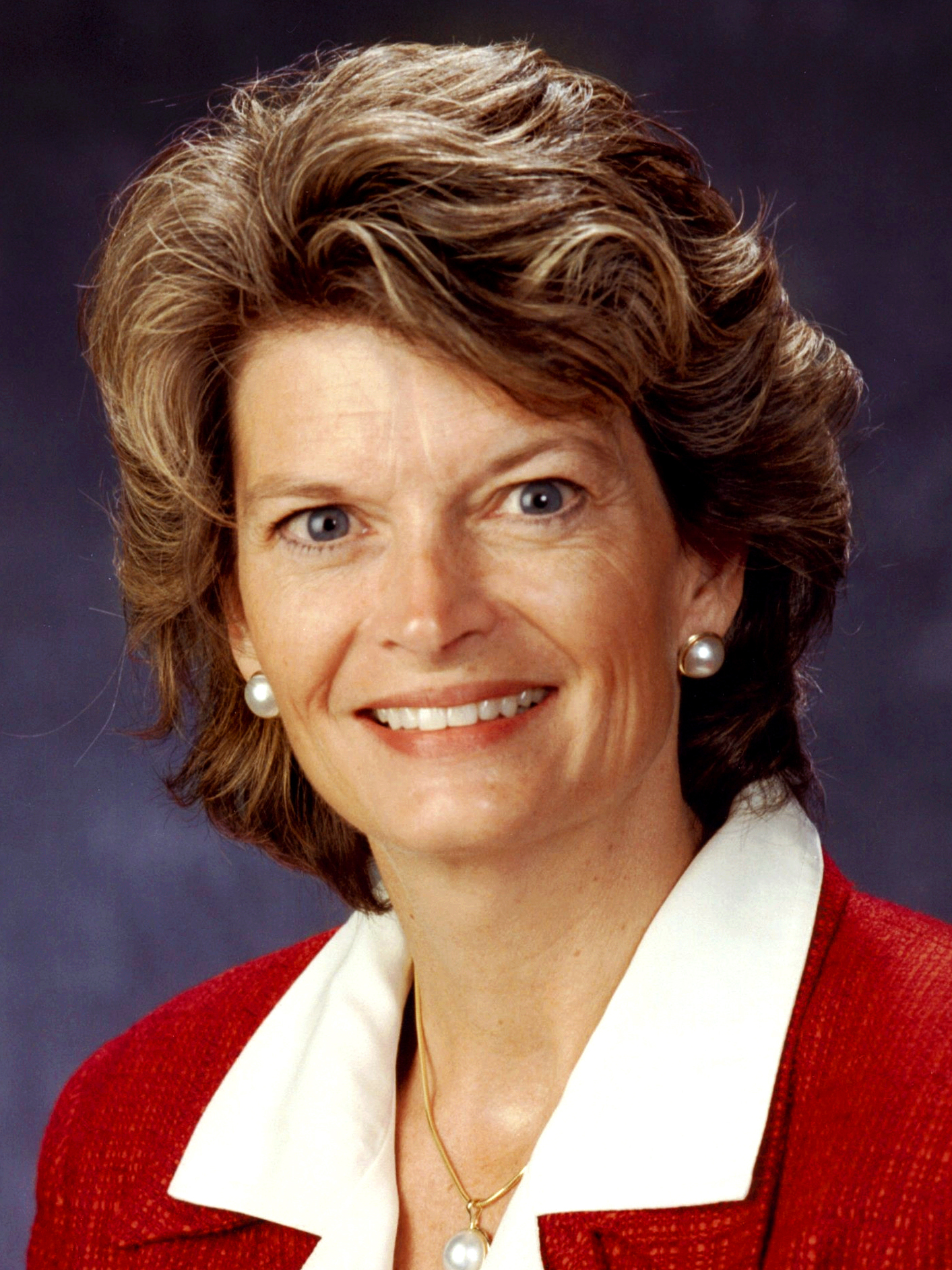
Senator
Lisa Murkowski
from Alaska
(2002–present)

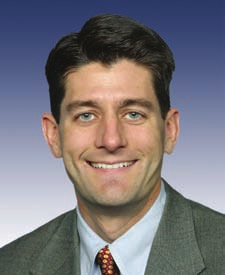
Representative
Paul Ryan
from Wisconsin
(1999–2019)

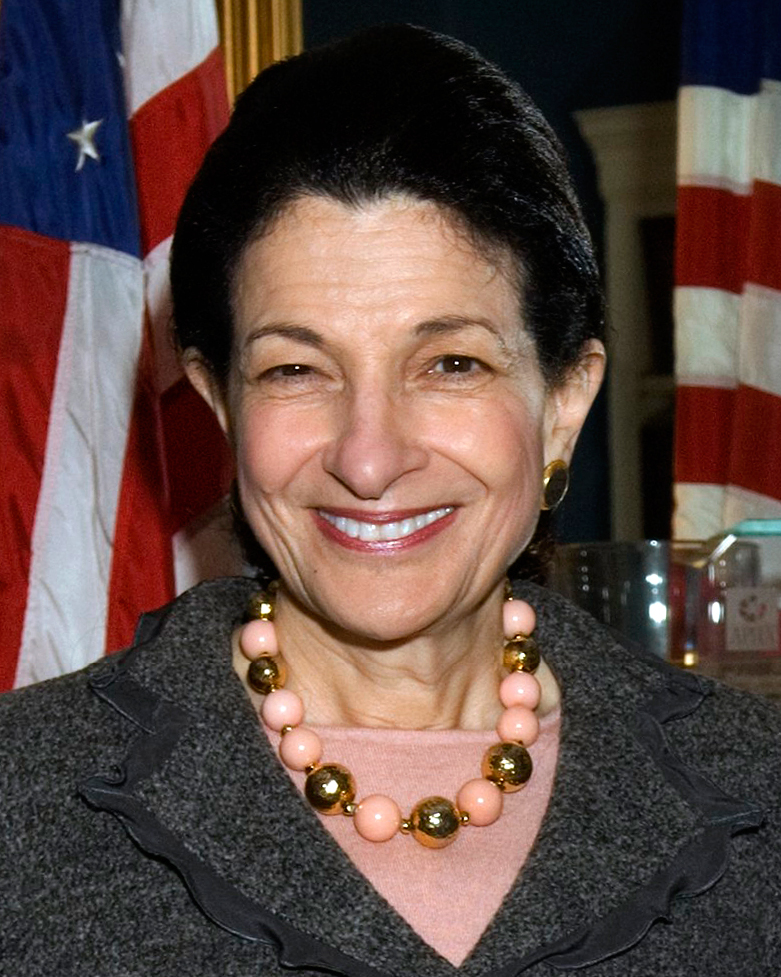
Senator
Olympia Snowe
from Maine
(1995–2013)

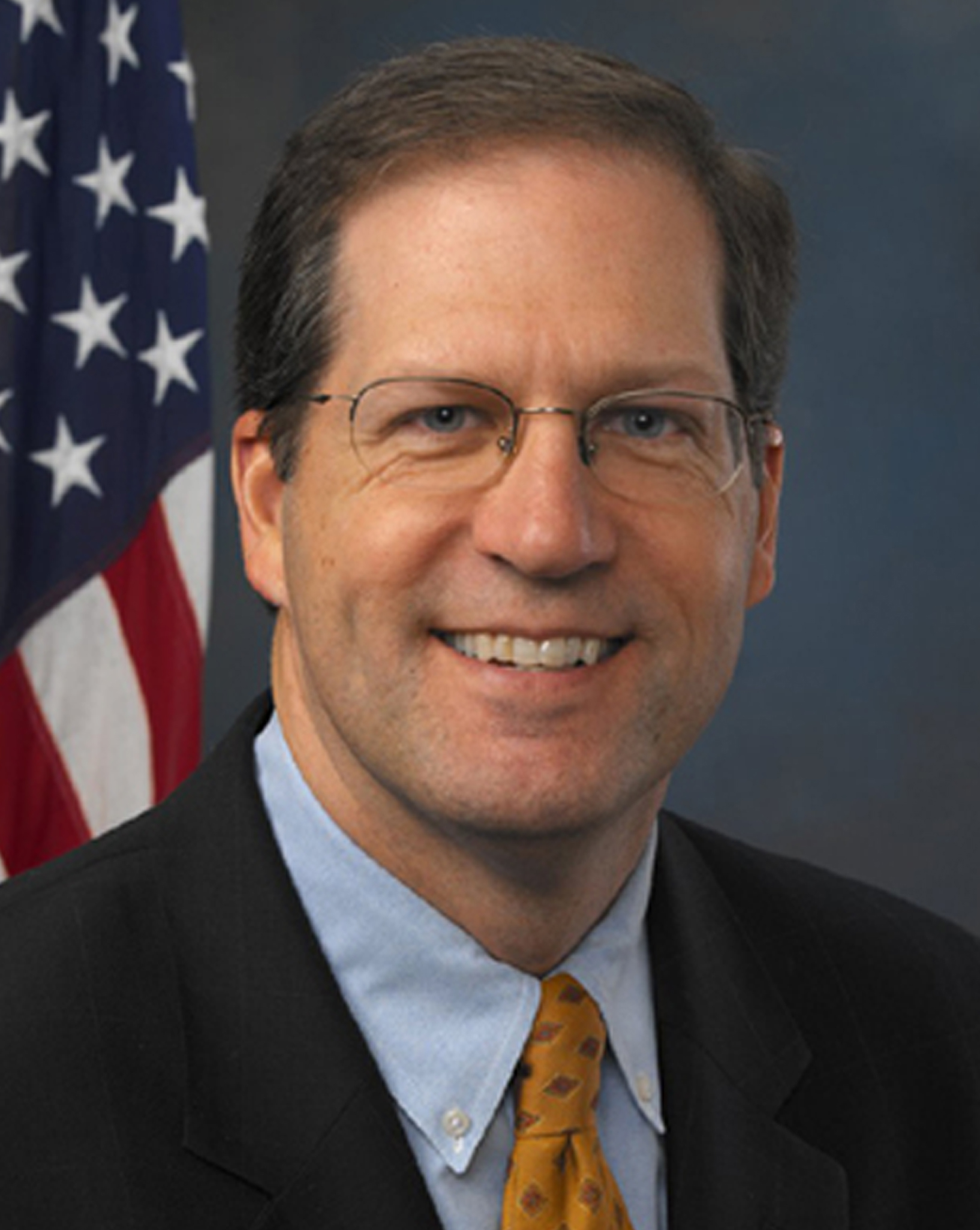
Senator
John E. Sununu
from New Hampshire
(2003–2009)

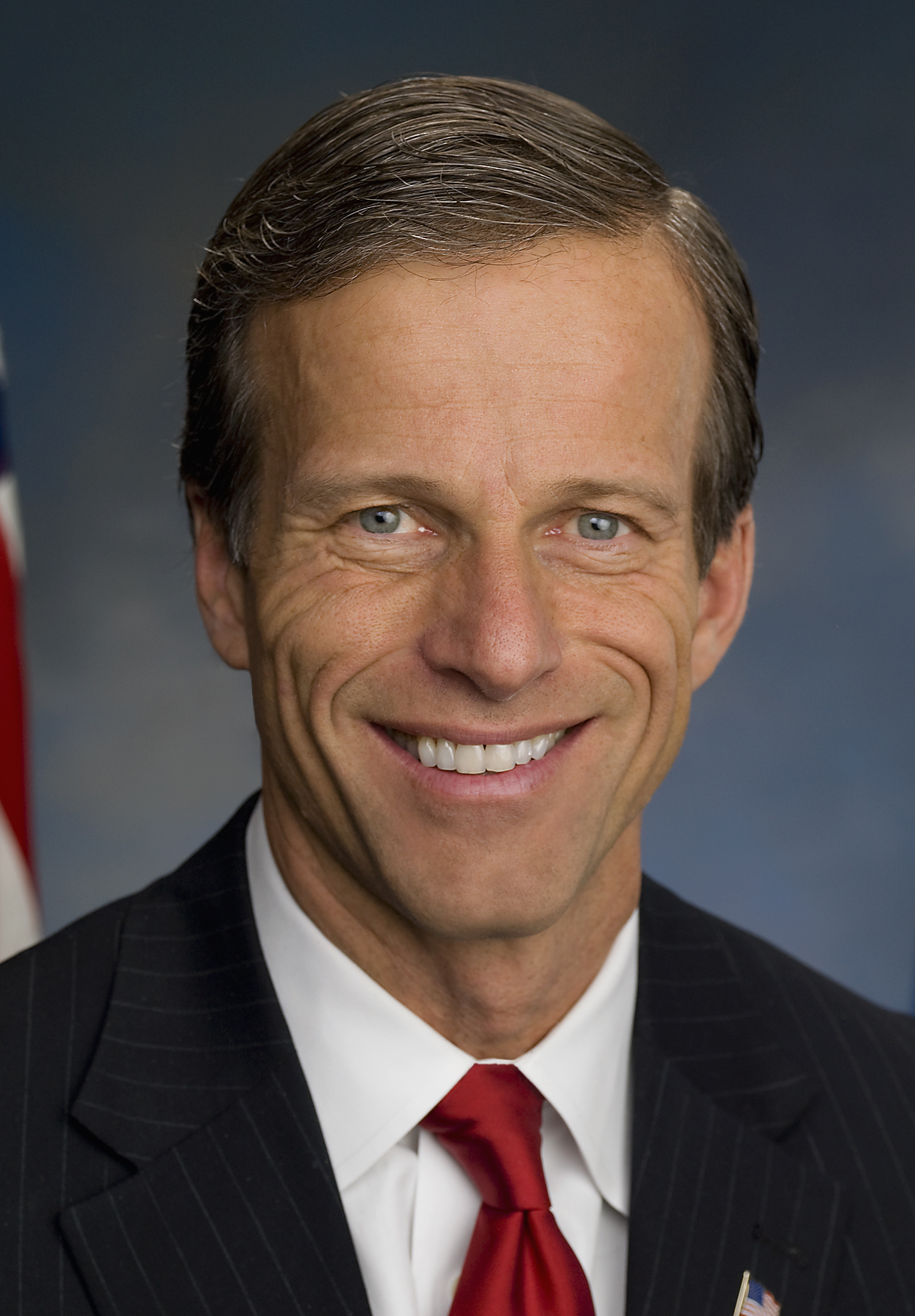
Senator
John Thune
from South Dakota
(2005–present)

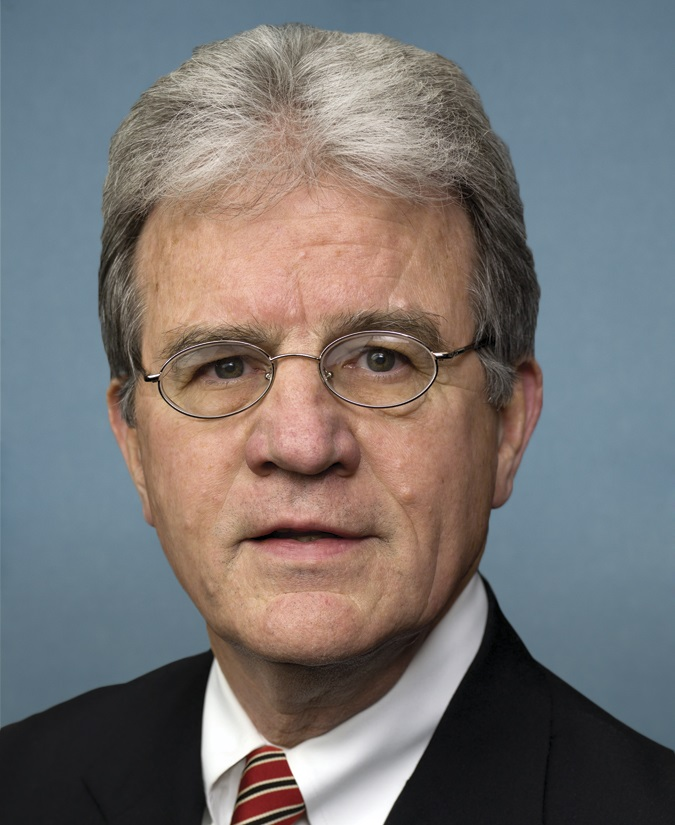
Senator
Tom Coburn
from Oklahoma
(2005–2015)

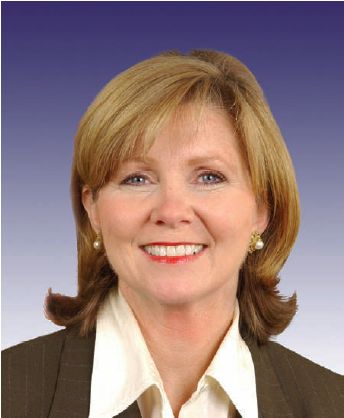
Representative
Marsha Blackburn
from Tennessee
(2003–2019)

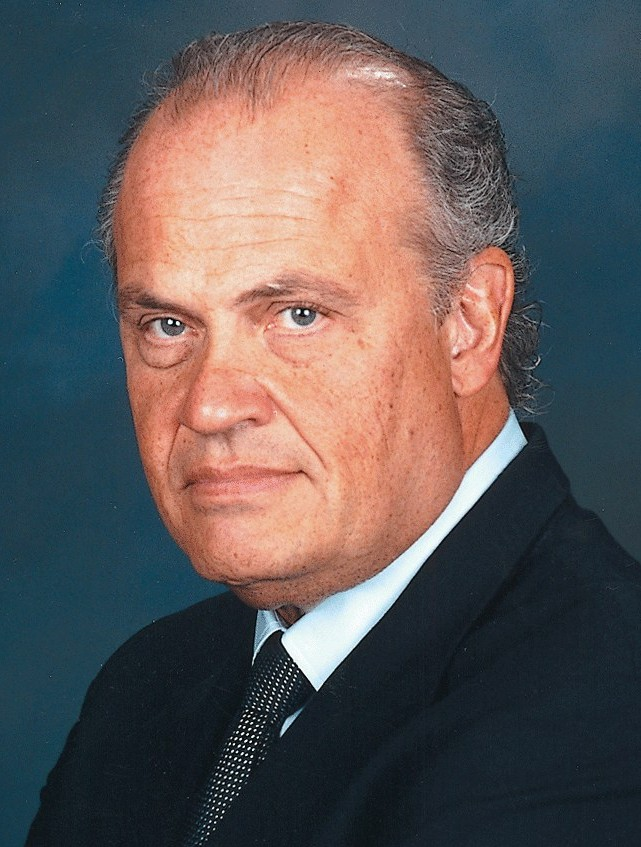
Former Senator
Fred Thompson
from Tennessee
(1994–2003)

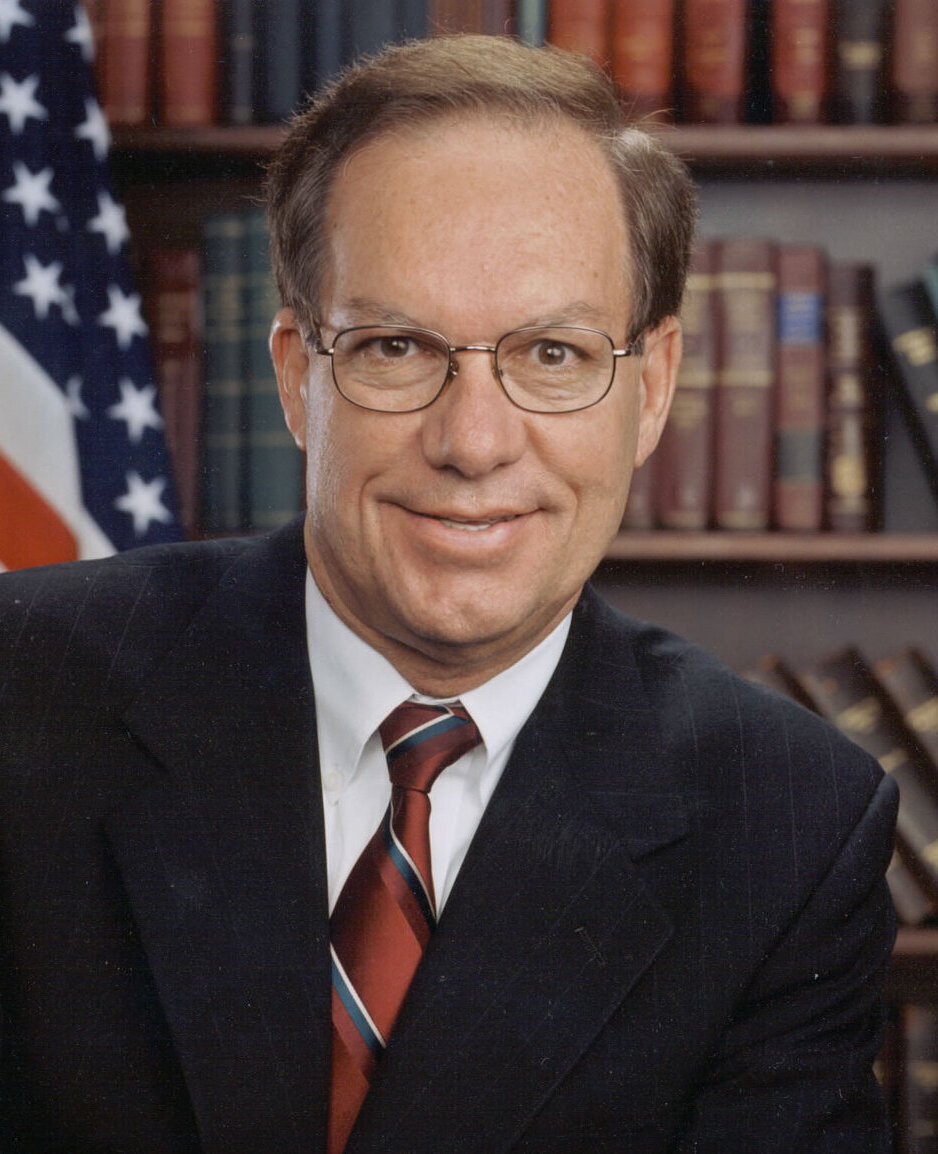
Senator
Wayne Allard
from Colorado
(1997–2009)

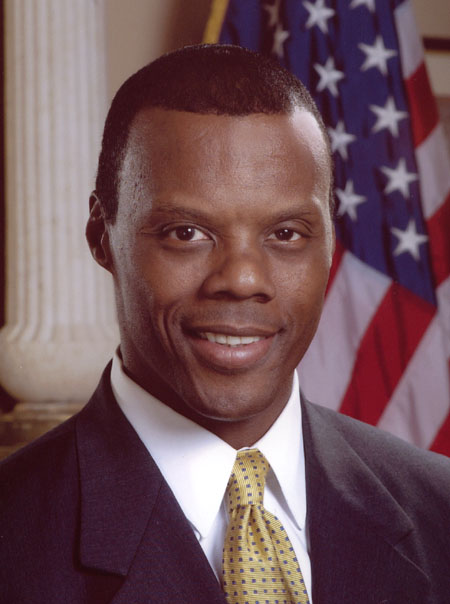
Former Representative
J. C. Watts
from Oklahoma
(1995–2003)

=== Governors ===
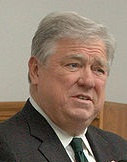
Haley Barbour
of Mississippi
(2004–2012)

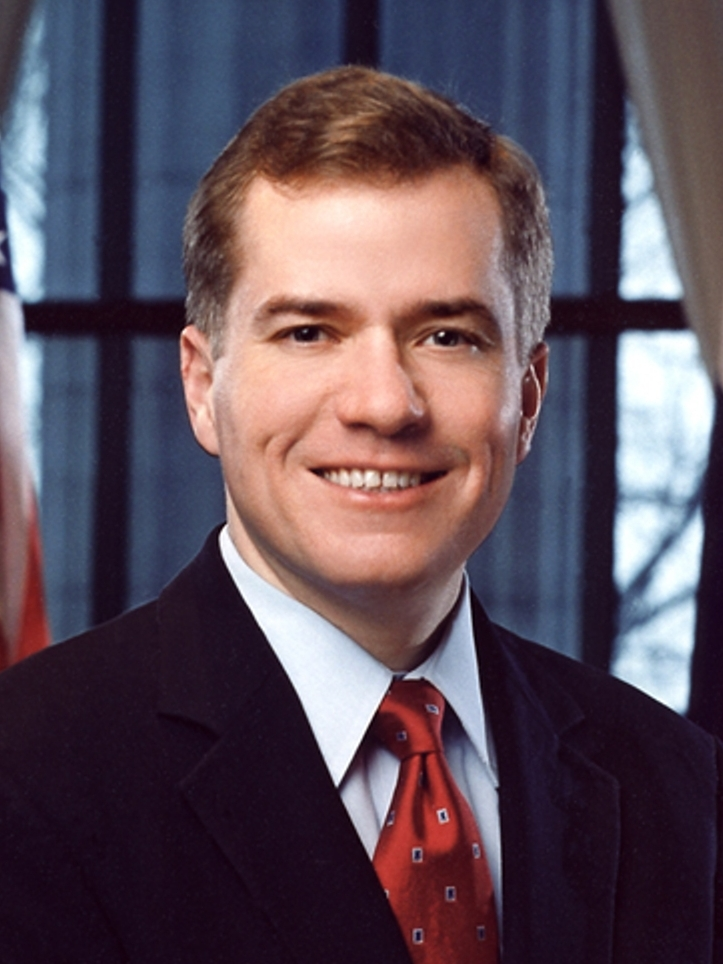
Matt Blunt
of Missouri
(2005–2009)

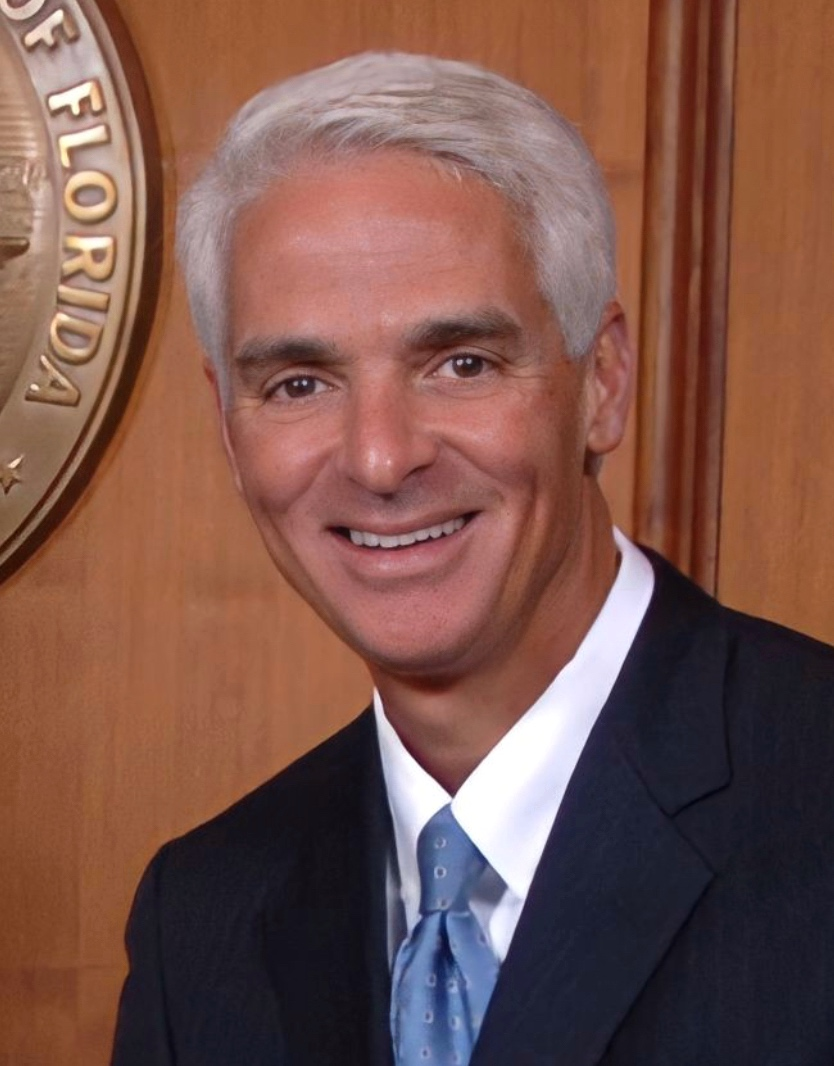
Charlie Crist
of Florida
(2007–2011)

Mike Huckabee
of Arkansas
(1996–2007)

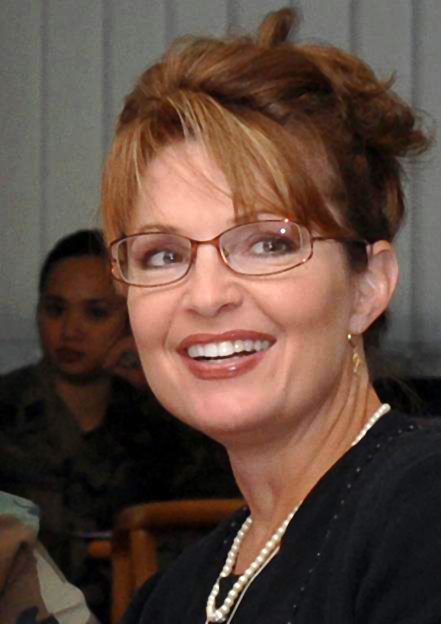
Sarah Palin
of Alaska
(2006–2009)

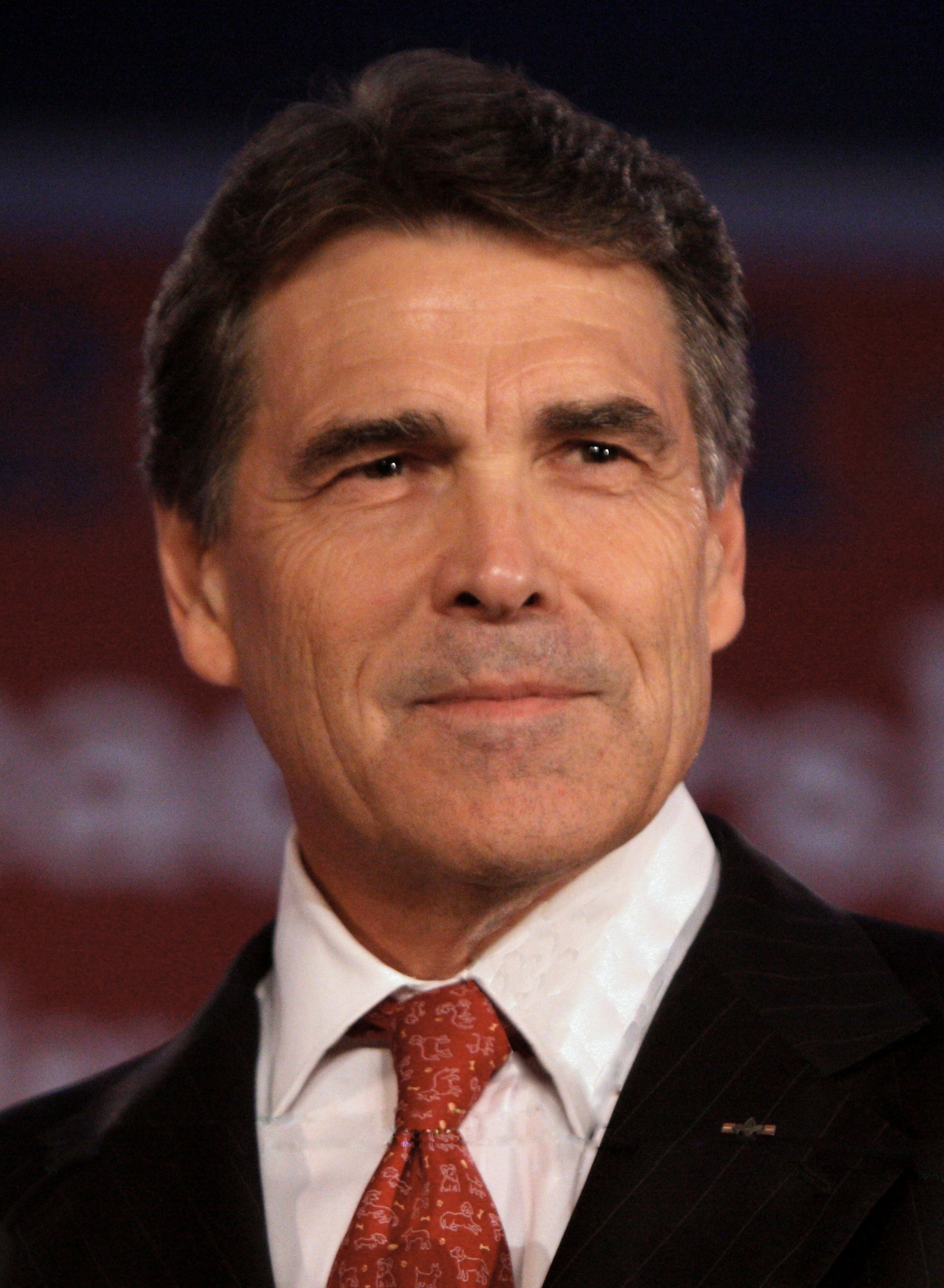
Rick Perry
of Texas
(2000–2015)

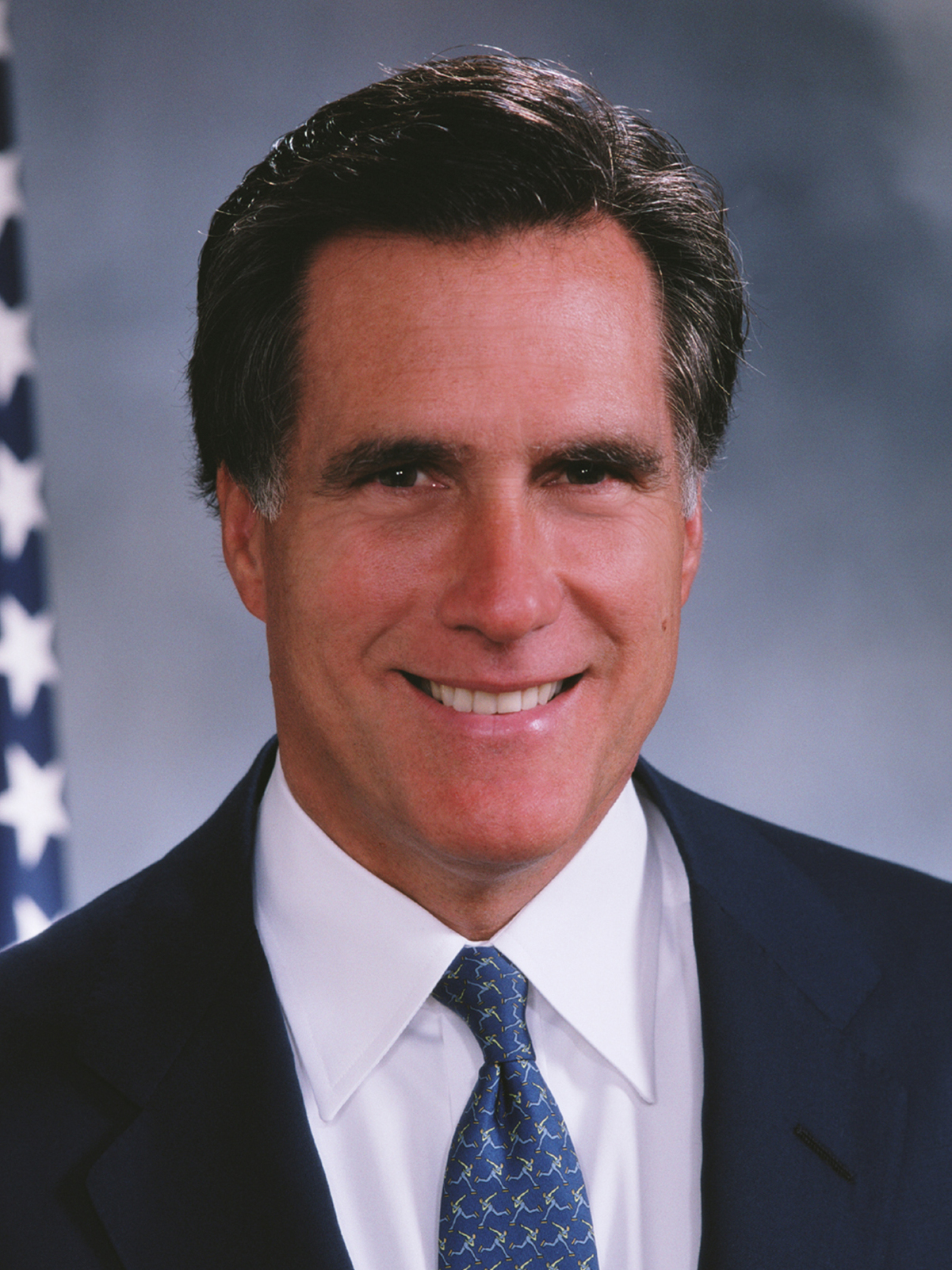
Mitt Romney
of Massachusetts
(2003–2007)

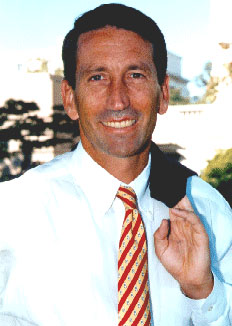
Mark Sanford
of South Carolina
(2003–2011)

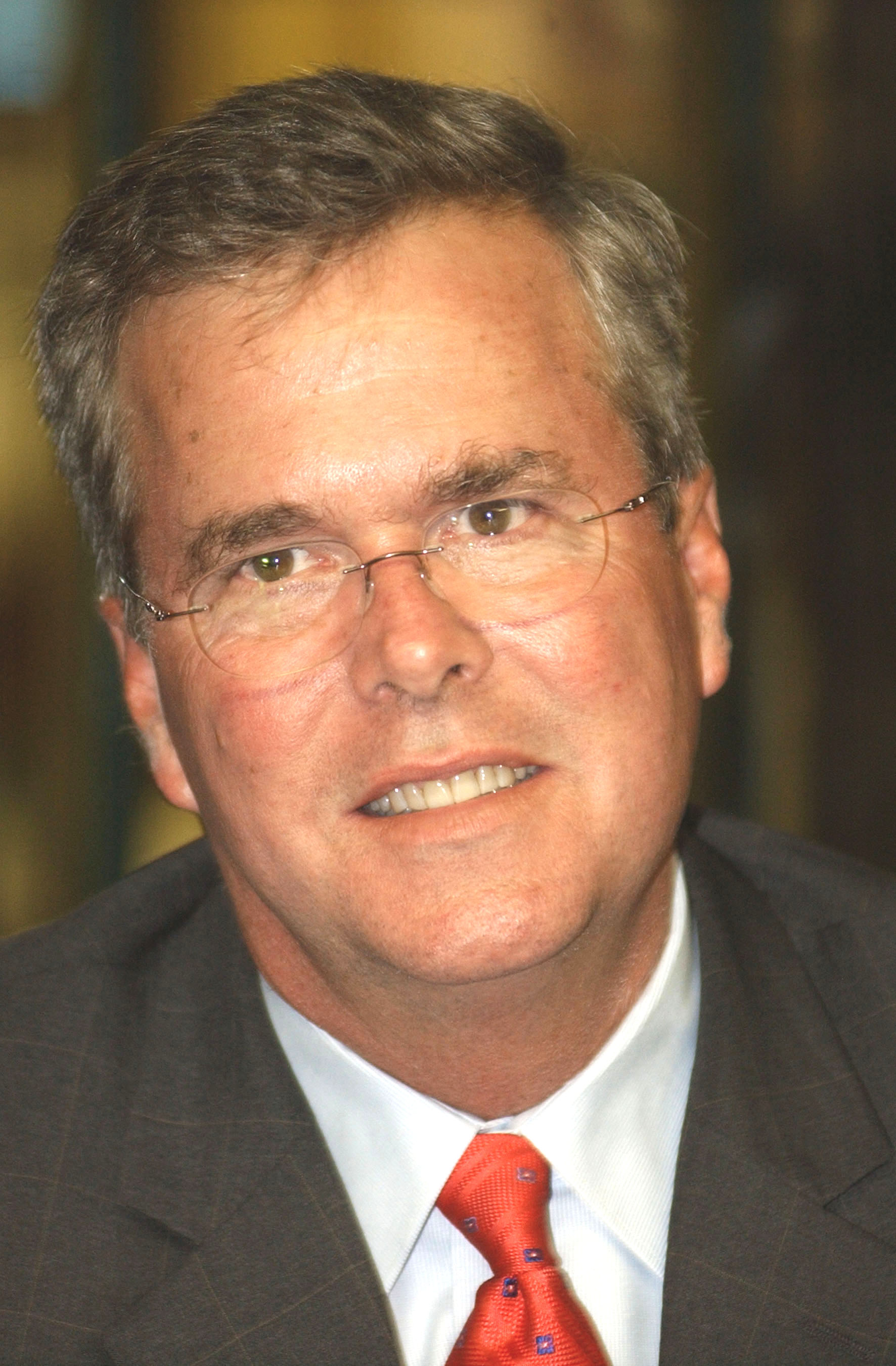
Jeb Bush
of Florida
(1999–2007)

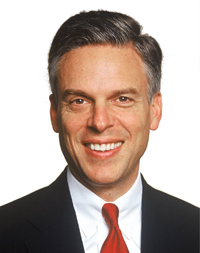
Jon Huntsman Jr.
of Utah
(2005–2009)

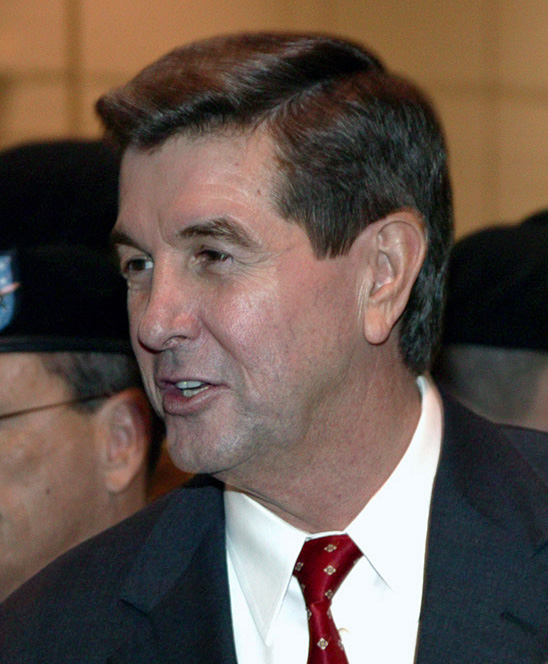
Bob Riley
of Alabama
(2003–2011)

=== Federal executive branch officials ===
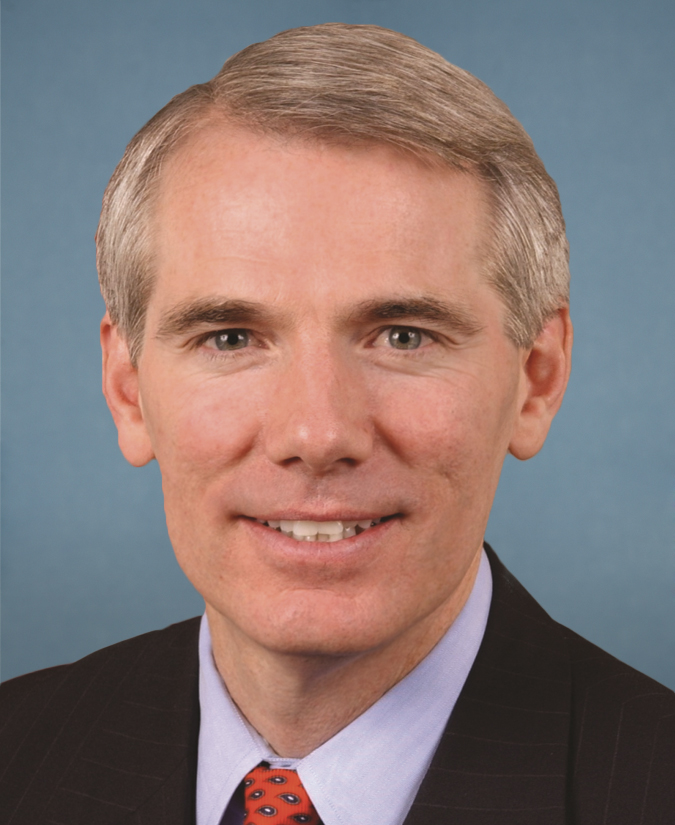
Former Director of the Office of Management and Budget
Rob Portman
from Ohio
(2006–2007)

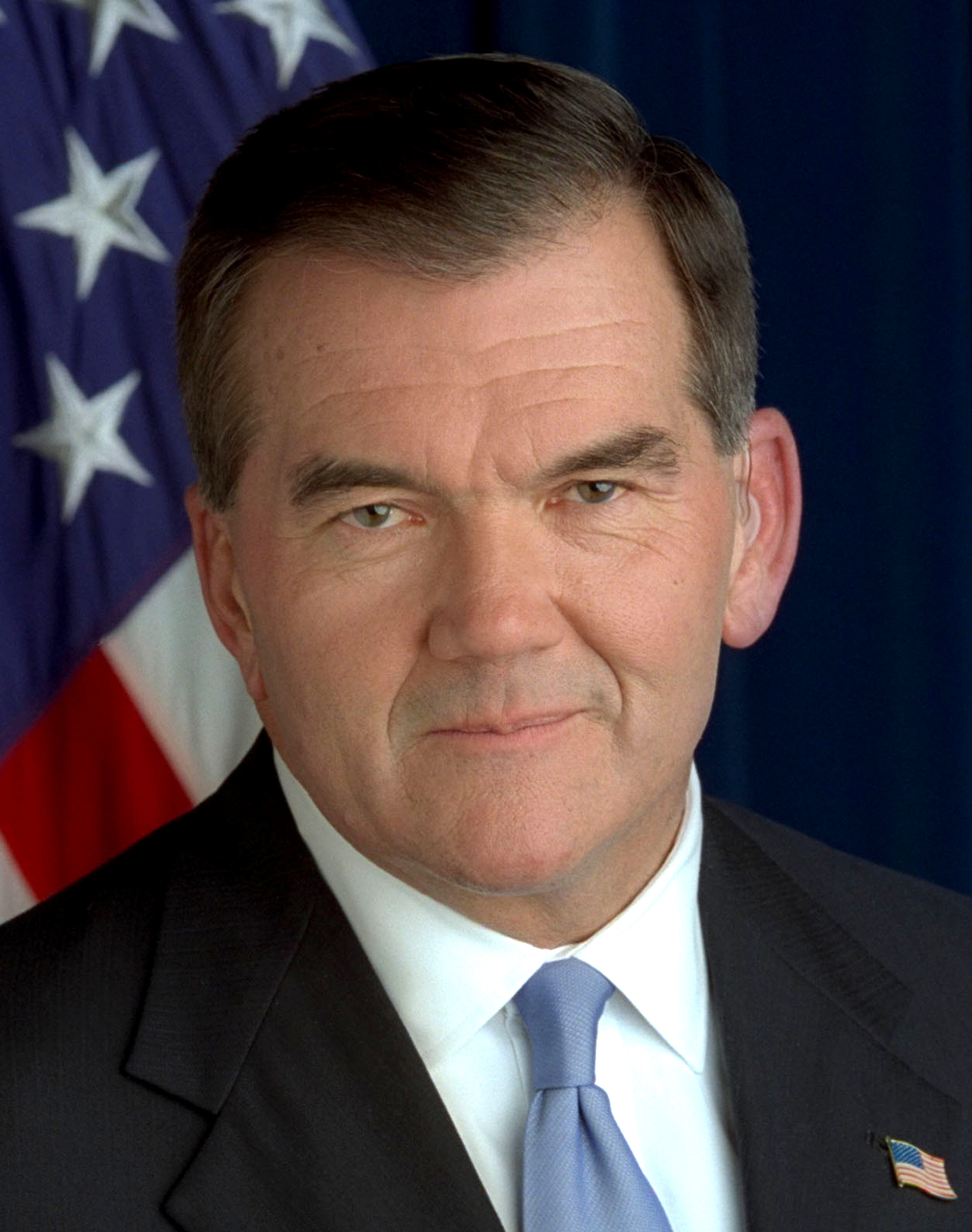
Former Secretary of Homeland Security
Tom Ridge
from Pennsylvania
(2003–2005)

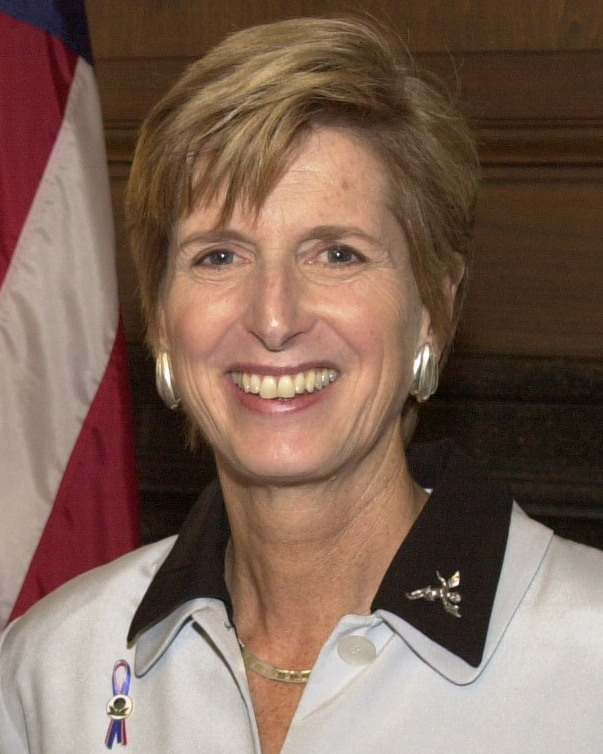
Former EPA Administrator
Christine Todd Whitman
from New Jersey
(2001–2003)

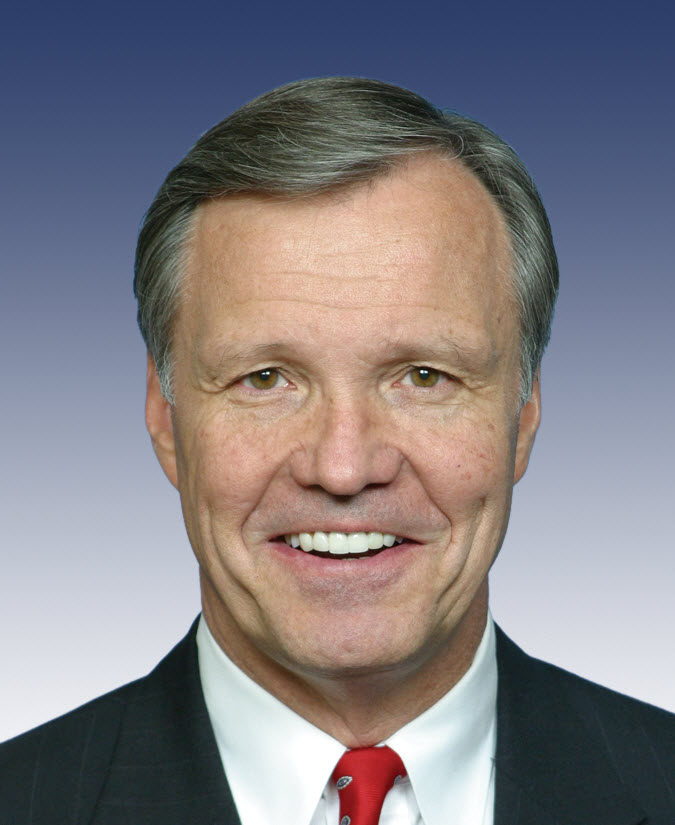
Chair of the SEC
Christopher Cox
from California
(2005–2009)

=== Other individuals ===
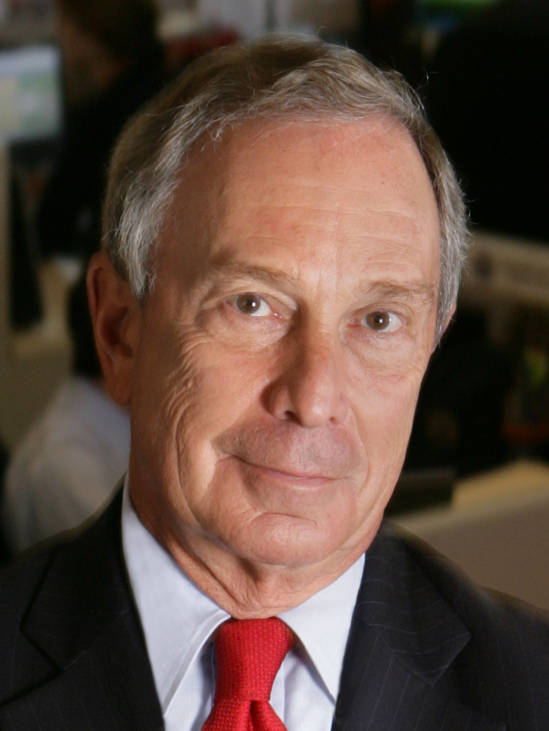
Mayor of New York City (Note: Bloomberg became an independent in 2007.)
Michael Bloomberg
from New York
(2002–2013)

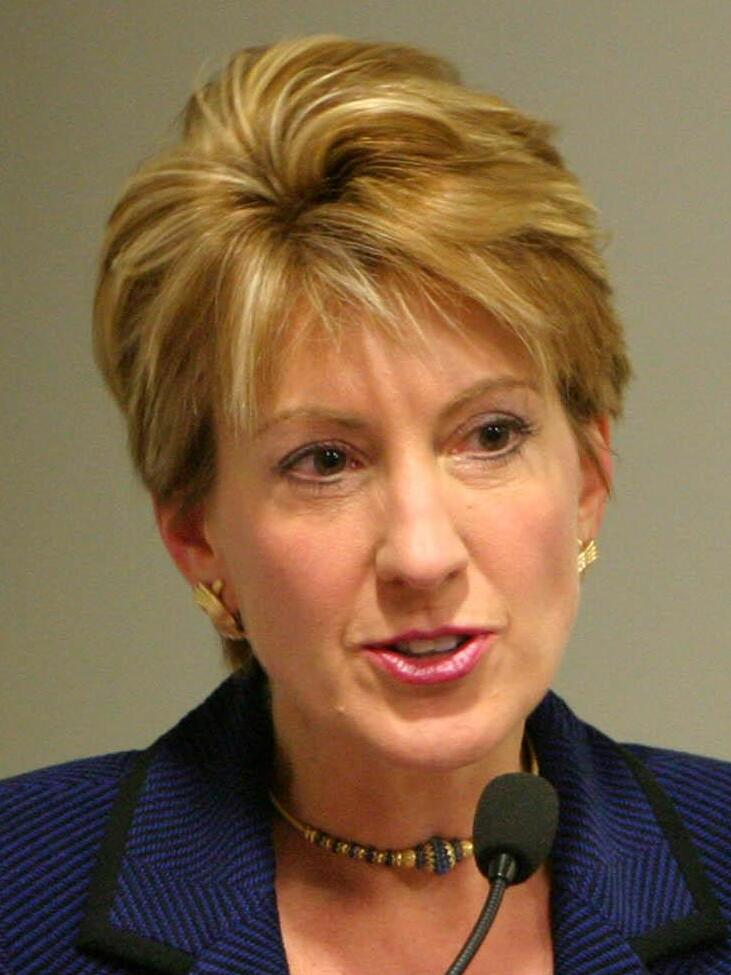
Former Hewlett-Packard CEO
Carly Fiorina
from California
(1995–2005)

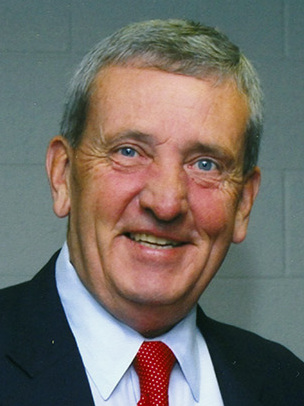
Retired U.S. Army General
Tommy Franks
from Oklahoma

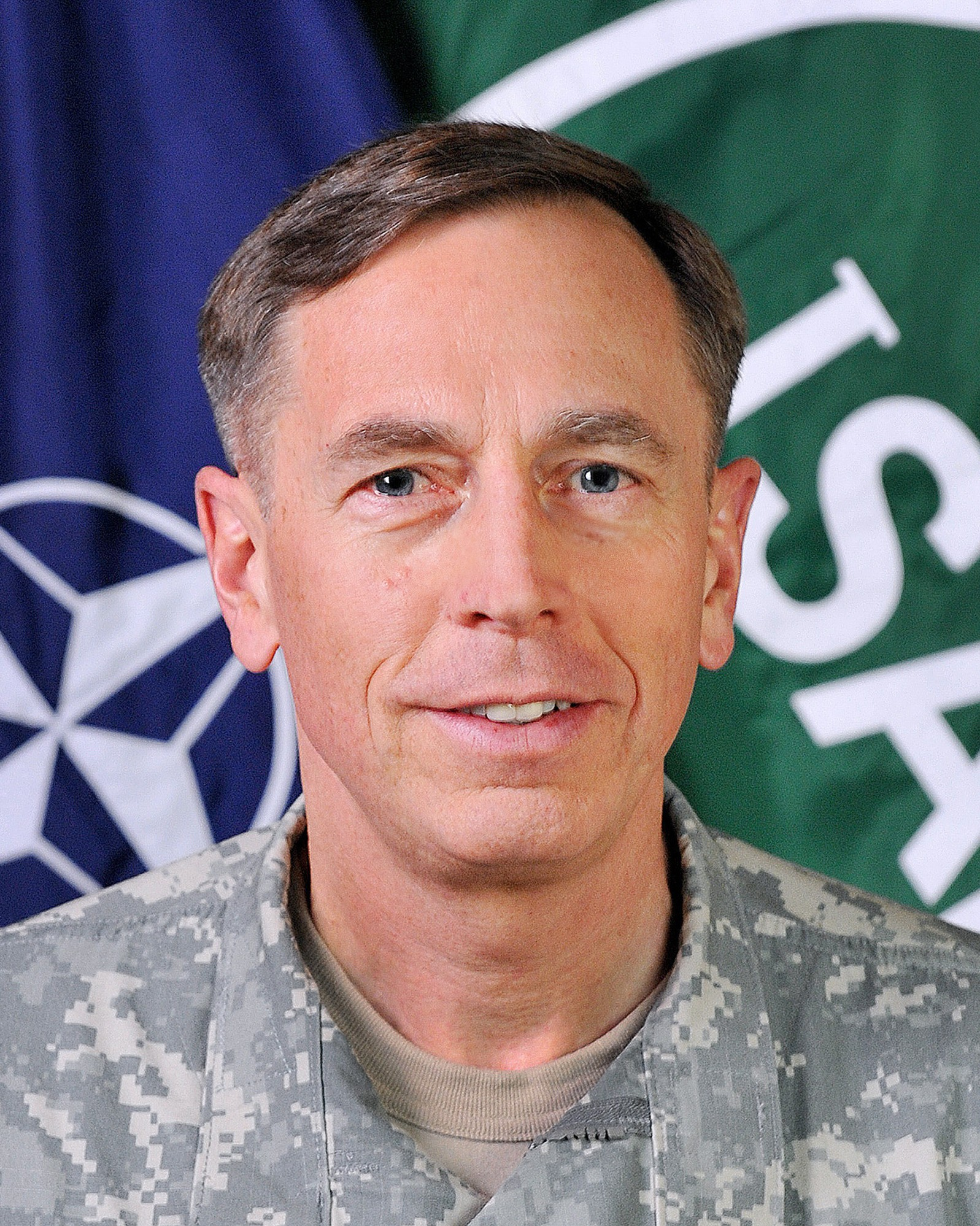
Commander of United States Central Command
David Petraeus
from New York
(2008–2010)

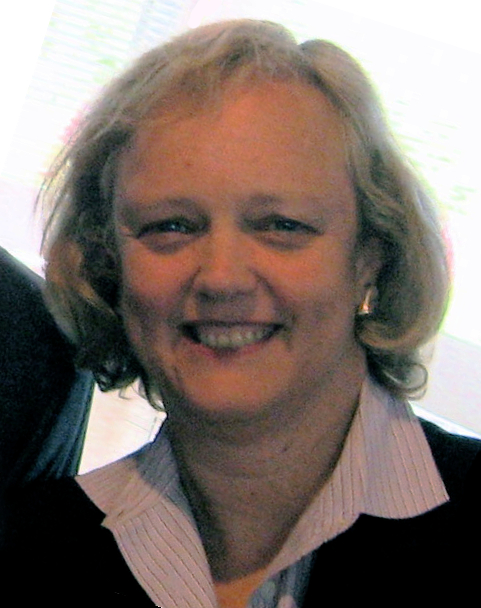
Former eBay CEO
Meg Whitman
from California
(1998–2008)

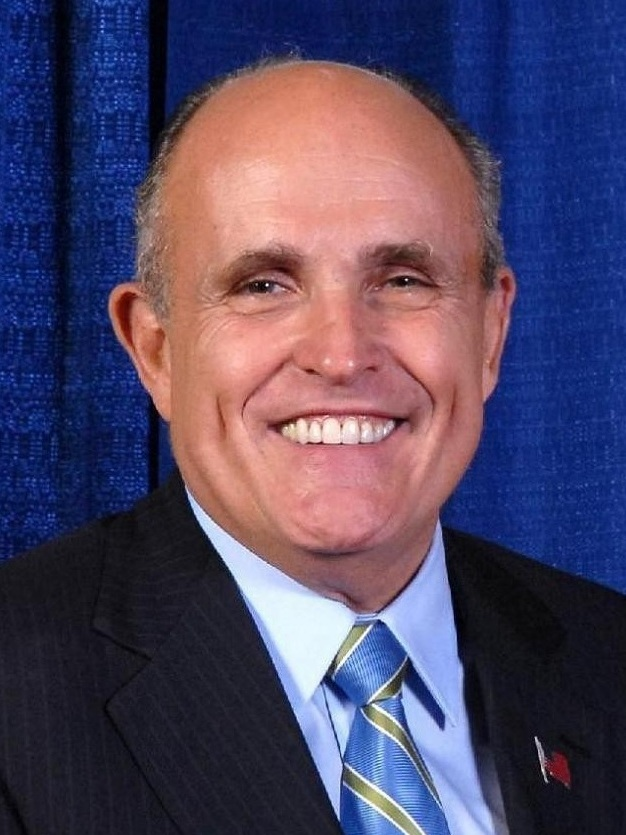
Former Mayor of New York City and 2008 presidential candidate
Rudy Giuliani
from New York
(1994–2001)

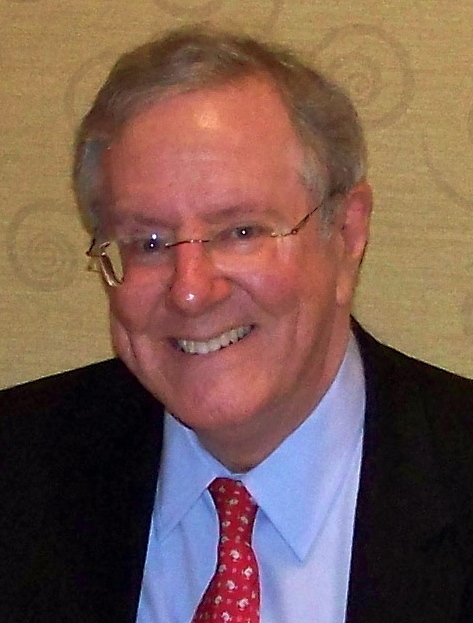
Publisher
Steve Forbes
from New Jersey

=== Declined interest ===
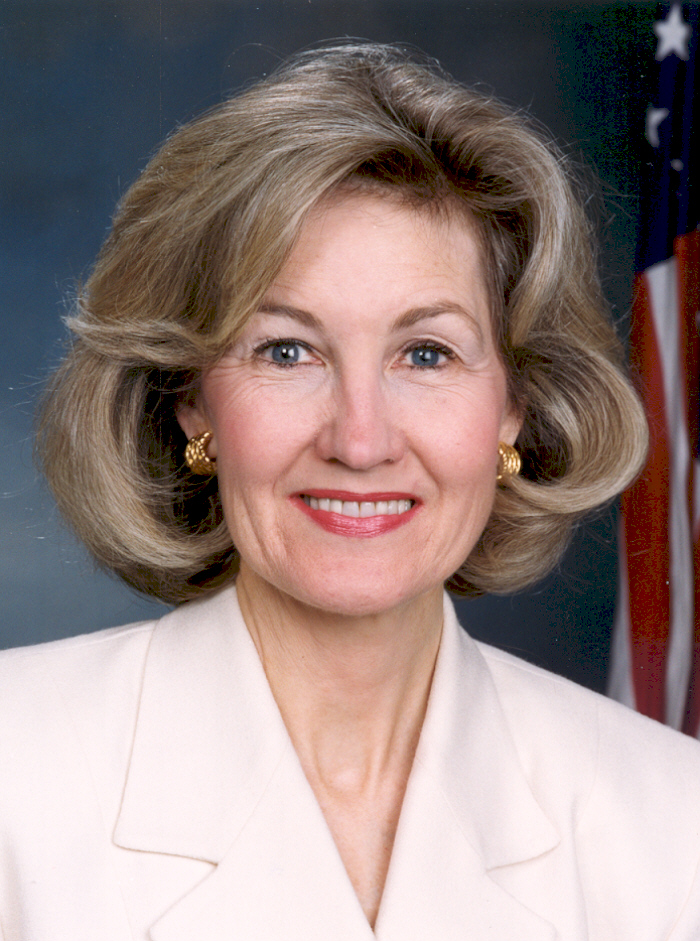
Senator
Kay Bailey Hutchison
from Texas
(1993–2013)

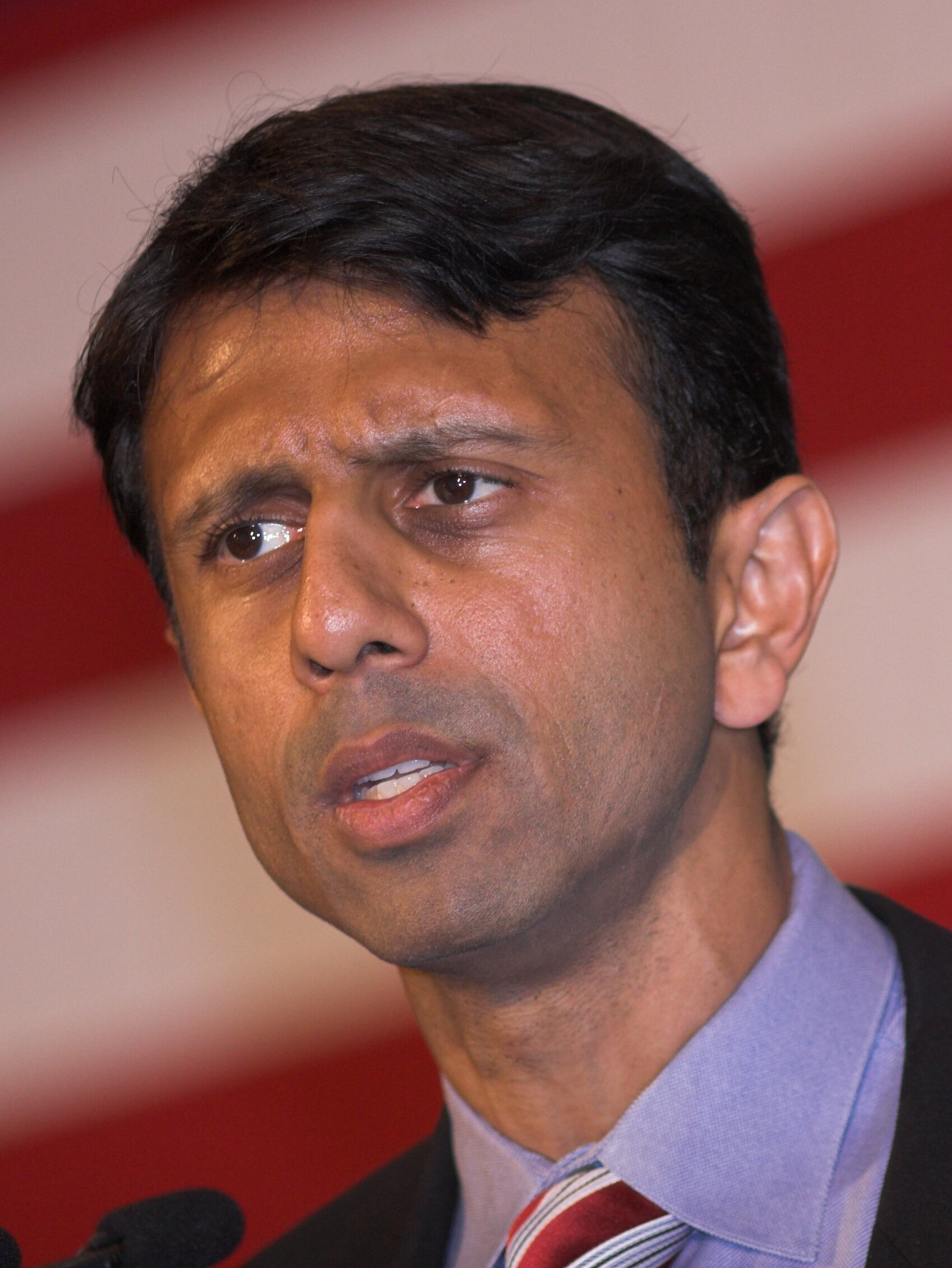
Governor
Bobby Jindal
of Louisiana
(2008–2016)

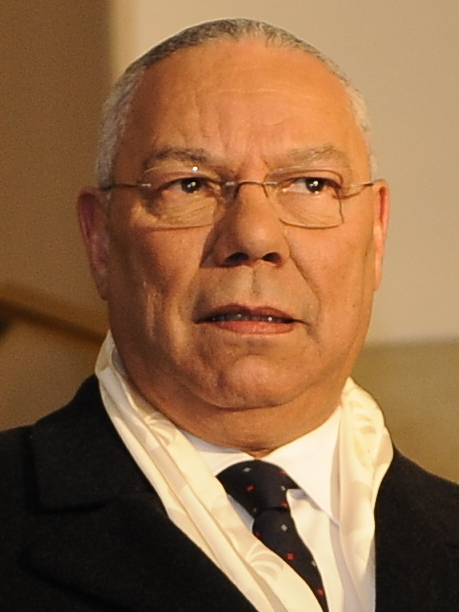
Former Secretary of State
Colin Powell
from Virginia
(2001–2005)

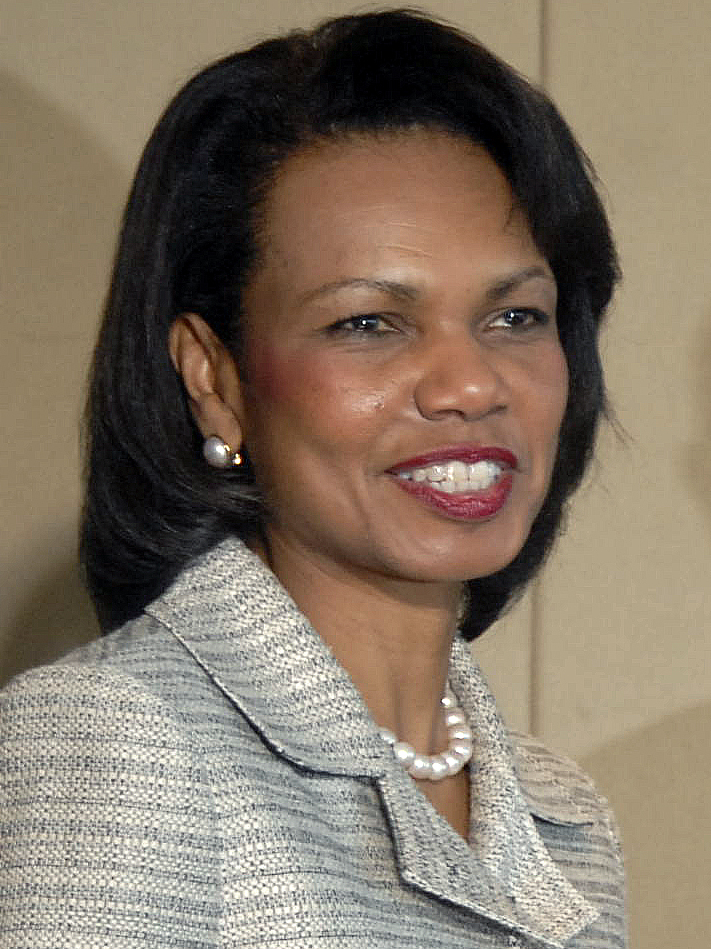
Secretary of State
Condoleezza Rice
from Alabama
(2005–2009)

== See also ==
- John McCain 2008 presidential campaign
- 2008 Republican Party presidential candidates
- 2008 Republican Party presidential primaries
- 2008 Republican National Convention
- 2008 United States presidential election
- List of United States major party presidential tickets
