= 2008 United States presidential election in Ohio =

- November 4, 2008
- Turnout: 69.97% (▼1.8 pp)

Nominee	Barack Obama	John McCain
Party	Democratic	Republican
Home state	Illinois	Arizona
Running mate	Joe Biden	Sarah Palin
Electoral vote	20	0
Popular vote	2,940,044	2,677,820
Percentage	51.50%	46.91%

Obama
40–50%
50–60%
60–70%
70–80%
80–90%
90–100%
McCain
40–50%
50–60%
60–70%
70–80%
80–90%
90–100%
President before election
George W. Bush
Republican
Elected President
Barack Obama
Democratic

The 2008 United States presidential election in Ohio took place on November 4, 2008, which was part of the 2008 United States presidential election. Voters chose 20 representatives, or electors to the Electoral College, who voted for president and vice president.

Ohio was won by Democratic nominee Barack Obama with a 4.59% margin of victory. Prior to the election, most news organizations considered this state as a major swing state and bellwether. Both major party candidates visited Ohio extensively and campaigned throughout the state, trying to sway moderates and independent voters to their side. The polls in Ohio were fairly even throughout the campaign but Obama had a slight lead as Election Day drew closer. In the end, Obama flipped Ohio into the Democratic column. Obama's 2,940,044 votes are the most received by a Democratic presidential candidate in the state's history.

Despite this fact, Obama became the first Democrat ever to win the White House without carrying Pike County. On the other hand, Obama became the first Democrat to win Hamilton County since 1964. As of the 2024 presidential election, this is the last election in which Lake County, Monroe County, Belmont County, Tuscarawas County, and Jefferson County voted for a Democratic presidential candidate.

Ohio is also one of only three states that backed Obama twice that would go on to vote against his vice president Joe Biden in 2020, the other two being Florida and Iowa.

== Primaries ==
- 2008 Ohio Republican presidential primary
- 2008 Ohio Democratic presidential primary

== Campaign ==
=== Predictions ===
There were 16 news organizations who made state-by-state predictions of the election. Here are their last predictions before election day:

Source	Ranking
D.C. Political Report	Likely R
Cook Political Report	Toss-up
The Takeaway	Toss-up
Electoral-vote.com	Lean D (flip)
Washington Post	Lean D (flip)
Politico	Lean D (flip)
RealClearPolitics	Toss-up
FiveThirtyEight	Lean D (flip)
CQ Politics	Lean D (flip)
The New York Times	Toss-up
CNN	Toss-up
NPR	Toss-up
MSNBC	Lean R
Fox News	Toss-up
Associated Press	Toss-up
Rasmussen Reports	Toss-up

=== Polling ===
During most of the summer and September, McCain led many state polls, many by 50% or more. Rasmussen had McCain leading with as high as 51% in September. But many voters in the state changed their minds as Obama later gained a steady lead in most polls taken starting in the beginning of October (around the time of the 2008 financial crisis).

=== Fundraising ===
Obama raised $7,218,801. McCain raised $5,682,839.

=== Advertising and visits ===
In a major swing state, Obama spent over $28 million to McCain's $24 million. The Republican ticket visited the state 28 times, compared to the Obama ticket's 22 times.

== Analysis ==
Going into the election, both McCain and Obama knew that Ohio was a crucial state. Earlier in the primary season, Ohio had given a major comeback victory to Hillary Clinton. Both candidates campaigned heavily throughout the state in hopes of winning its 20 electoral votes. As no Republican has ever won the presidency without winning Ohio, it was seen in particular as a "must-win" state for McCain. George W. Bush's narrow wins in 2000 (by 3.51% against Al Gore) and 2004 (2.10% against John Kerry) proved critical in Bush's narrow wins nationally.

Obama won Ohio's 20 electoral votes by a margin of 4.59%. Obama's win in heavily populated areas such as Cuyahoga County (Cleveland), Franklin County (Columbus), Lucas County (Toledo), Montgomery County (Dayton), Summit County (Akron), Stark County (Canton), Mahoning County (Youngstown) and the traditionally Republican Hamilton County (Cincinnati) greatly contributed to his victory in the state.

McCain did best in the Republican base in the center and western regions, composed of relatively rural areas combined with Cincinnati and Columbus' heavily Republican suburbs. In addition, McCain won all but four counties in the Appalachian southeast, mirroring the troubles Obama had throughout this region. On the other hand, Obama did best in the Democratic base—Cleveland (where he won almost 70% of the vote), Youngstown and the heavily unionized counties next to Pennsylvania. However, he was unable to significantly improve upon John Kerry's performance in these areas. More surprisingly, the cities of Cincinnati and Columbus gave Obama strong support. Cincinnati, the only major city that didn't vote for Franklin D. Roosevelt in 1940, voted Democratic for the first time since 1964. Columbus, a city shifting to the Democrats, also voted for Obama by a three-to-two margin. In addition, Obama won several northern counties along the shore of Lake Erie that John Kerry had lost in 2004.

As polls closed and results were coming in on Election Night, Republican strategist and adviser Karl Rove joined Brit Hume on Fox News offering analysis. Rove was discussing the impact an Ohio loss would have on McCain's chances of winning the election. "If he loses Ohio," Rove stated of McCain, "he goes from 286, which the Republicans carried in 2004, down to 266, and that puts him below the 270 threshold needed to win the White House. So he'd not only need to sweep the rest of these states which were won by the Republicans in 2004, he'd also need to pick up something as well." In an untimely moment, Hume broke in. "Guess what Karl," Hume interrupted, "I've just received word that the state of Ohio has gone for Barack Obama."

== Results ==
2008 United States presidential election in Ohio
Party	Candidate	Running mate	Votes	Percentage	Electoral votes
Democratic	Barack Obama	Joe Biden	2,940,044	51.50%	20
Republican	John McCain	Sarah Palin	2,677,820	46.91%	0
Independent	Ralph Nader	Matt Gonzalez	42,337	0.74%	0
Libertarian	Bob Barr	Wayne Allyn Root	19,917	0.35%	0
Write-ins	Write-ins		13,698	0.24%	0
Constitution	Chuck Baldwin	Darrell Castle	12,565	0.22%	0
Green	Cynthia McKinney	Rosa Clemente	8,518	0.15%	0
Others	Others		6,932	0.12%	0
Totals			5,721,831	100.00%	20
Voter turnout (Voting age population)					67.3%

=== By county ===
County	Barack Obama Democratic		John McCain Republican		Various candidates Other parties		Margin		Total votes cast
County	#	%	#	%	#	%	#	%	Total votes cast
Adams	4,170	36.53%	6,914	60.57%	330	2.90%	-2,744	-24.04%	11,414
Allen	19,522	38.66%	29,940	59.29%	1,033	2.05%	-10,418	-20.63%	50,495
Ashland	9,300	36.93%	15,158	60.19%	727	2.88%	-5,858	-23.26%	25,185
Ashtabula	25,027	55.52%	18,949	42.04%	1,100	2.44%	6,078	13.48%	45,076
Athens	20,722	66.29%	9,742	31.17%	795	2.54%	10,980	35.12%	31,259
Auglaize	6,738	28.60%	16,414	69.67%	407	1.73%	-9,676	-41.07%	23,559
Belmont	16,302	50.10%	15,422	47.40%	812	2.50%	880	2.70%	32,536
Brown	7,503	37.21%	12,192	60.46%	471	2.33%	-4,689	-23.25%	20,166
Butler	66,030	37.94%	105,341	60.52%	2,688	1.54%	-39,311	-22.58%	174,059
Carroll	6,423	45.93%	7,097	50.75%	465	3.32%	-674	-4.82%	13,985
Champaign	7,385	39.00%	11,141	58.84%	410	2.16%	-3,756	-19.84%	18,936
Clark	31,958	47.71%	33,634	50.21%	1,395	2.08%	-1,676	-2.50%	66,987
Clermont	31,611	33.02%	62,559	65.35%	1,564	1.63%	-30,948	-32.33%	95,734
Clinton	6,558	33.91%	12,409	64.16%	375	1.93%	-5,851	-30.25%	19,342
Columbiana	21,882	44.93%	25,585	52.54%	1,232	2.53%	-3,703	-7.61%	48,699
Coshocton	7,689	45.39%	8,675	51.22%	574	3.39%	-986	-5.83%	16,938
Crawford	8,289	39.05%	12,316	58.03%	620	2.92%	-4,027	-18.98%	21,225
Cuyahoga	458,422	68.70%	199,880	29.95%	8,997	1.35%	258,542	38.75%	667,299
Darke	7,964	30.82%	17,290	66.92%	584	2.26%	-9,326	-36.10%	25,838
Defiance	8,399	43.67%	10,407	54.11%	426	2.22%	-2,008	-10.44%	19,232
Delaware	36,653	39.59%	54,778	59.17%	1,150	1.24%	-18,125	-19.58%	92,581
Erie	23,148	55.95%	17,432	42.13%	795	1.92%	5,716	13.82%	41,375
Fairfield	29,250	40.54%	41,580	57.63%	1,317	1.83%	-12,330	-17.09%	72,147
Fayette	4,401	37.56%	7,102	60.61%	215	1.83%	-2,701	-23.05%	11,718
Franklin	334,709	59.58%	218,486	38.89%	8,568	1.53%	116,223	20.69%	561,763
Fulton	9,900	44.97%	11,689	53.10%	424	1.93%	-1,789	-8.13%	22,013
Gallia	4,777	35.73%	8,247	61.68%	347	2.59%	-3,470	-25.95%	13,371
Geauga	21,250	41.47%	29,096	56.78%	899	1.75%	-7,846	-15.31%	51,245
Greene	33,540	40.06%	48,936	58.45%	1,253	1.49%	-15,396	-18.39%	83,729
Guernsey	7,625	43.88%	9,197	52.93%	553	3.19%	-1,572	-9.05%	17,375
Hamilton	225,213	52.98%	195,530	46.00%	4,343	1.02%	29,683	6.98%	425,086
Hancock	13,870	37.43%	22,420	60.50%	765	2.07%	-8,550	-23.07%	37,055
Hardin	5,013	38.12%	7,749	58.93%	387	2.95%	-2,736	-20.81%	13,149
Harrison	3,683	47.12%	3,872	49.53%	262	3.35%	-189	-2.41%	7,817
Henry	6,320	42.55%	8,239	55.47%	293	1.98%	-1,919	-12.92%	14,852
Highland	6,856	35.65%	11,907	61.92%	468	2.43%	-5,051	-26.27%	19,231
Hocking	6,259	48.09%	6,364	48.89%	393	3.02%	-105	-0.80%	13,016
Holmes	3,141	28.21%	7,720	69.34%	273	2.45%	-4,579	-41.13%	11,134
Huron	12,076	47.21%	12,884	50.36%	622	2.43%	-808	-3.15%	25,582
Jackson	5,397	38.42%	8,219	58.51%	431	3.07%	-2,822	-20.09%	14,047
Jefferson	17,635	48.89%	17,559	48.68%	877	2.43%	76	0.21%	36,071
Knox	11,014	38.94%	16,640	58.83%	631	2.23%	-5,626	-19.89%	28,285
Lake	60,155	49.45%	59,142	48.62%	2,345	1.93%	1,013	0.83%	121,642
Lawrence	11,262	41.12%	15,415	56.28%	713	2.60%	-4,153	-15.16%	27,390
Licking	33,932	41.09%	46,918	56.82%	1,720	2.09%	-12,986	-15.73%	82,570
Logan	7,936	35.61%	13,848	62.15%	499	2.24%	-5,912	-26.54%	22,283
Lorain	85,276	58.07%	59,068	40.22%	2,515	1.71%	26,208	17.85%	146,859
Lucas	142,852	64.80%	73,706	33.43%	3,899	1.77%	69,146	31.37%	220,457
Madison	6,532	37.30%	10,606	60.57%	372	2.13%	-4,074	-23.27%	17,510
Mahoning	79,173	62.02%	45,319	35.50%	3,167	2.48%	33,854	26.52%	127,659
Marion	12,870	44.24%	15,454	53.12%	768	2.64%	-2,584	-8.88%	29,092
Medina	40,924	45.14%	48,189	53.16%	1,539	1.70%	-7,265	-8.02%	90,652
Meigs	4,094	39.34%	6,015	57.80%	298	2.86%	-1,921	-18.46%	10,407
Mercer	5,853	27.48%	15,100	70.90%	346	1.62%	-9,247	-43.42%	21,299
Miami	18,372	34.72%	33,417	63.15%	1,126	2.13%	-15,045	-28.43%	52,915
Monroe	3,705	53.07%	3,066	43.91%	211	3.02%	639	9.16%	6,982
Montgomery	145,997	52.32%	128,679	46.12%	4,355	1.56%	17,318	6.20%	279,031
Morgan	2,966	44.80%	3,440	51.96%	214	3.24%	-474	-7.16%	6,620
Morrow	6,177	37.03%	10,067	60.36%	435	2.61%	-3,890	-23.33%	16,679
Muskingum	17,730	45.20%	20,549	52.39%	946	2.41%	-2,819	-7.19%	39,225
Noble	2,474	39.98%	3,450	55.75%	264	4.27%	-976	-15.77%	6,188
Ottawa	12,064	52.25%	10,624	46.01%	402	1.74%	1,440	6.24%	23,090
Paulding	4,165	42.57%	5,317	54.34%	303	3.09%	-1,152	-11.77%	9,785
Perry	7,261	47.04%	7,721	50.02%	455	2.94%	-460	-2.98%	15,437
Pickaway	9,077	38.16%	14,228	59.81%	482	2.03%	-5,151	-21.65%	23,787
Pike	6,033	48.24%	6,162	49.27%	311	2.49%	-129	-1.03%	12,506
Portage	41,856	53.39%	34,822	44.41%	1,724	2.20%	7,034	8.98%	78,402
Preble	6,999	33.25%	13,562	64.43%	488	2.32%	-6,563	-31.18%	21,049
Putnam	5,281	28.27%	13,072	69.98%	327	1.75%	-7,791	-41.71%	18,680
Richland	25,727	42.01%	34,034	55.58%	1,478	2.41%	-8,307	-13.57%	61,239
Ross	14,455	45.28%	16,759	52.49%	711	2.23%	-2,304	-7.21%	31,925
Sandusky	15,602	51.36%	14,192	46.72%	583	1.92%	1,410	4.64%	30,377
Scioto	14,926	45.61%	16,994	51.93%	803	2.46%	-2,068	-6.32%	32,723
Seneca	13,087	47.50%	13,823	50.17%	643	2.33%	-736	-2.67%	27,553
Shelby	7,316	30.85%	15,924	67.14%	478	2.01%	-8,608	-36.29%	23,718
Stark	96,990	51.59%	86,743	46.14%	4,277	2.27%	10,247	5.45%	188,010
Summit	160,858	57.73%	113,284	40.66%	4,487	1.61%	47,574	17.07%	278,629
Trumbull	64,145	59.80%	40,164	37.44%	2,962	2.76%	23,981	22.36%	107,271
Tuscarawas	21,498	49.93%	20,454	47.50%	1,105	2.57%	1,044	2.43%	43,057
Union	8,761	35.07%	15,744	63.02%	479	1.91%	-6,983	-27.95%	24,984
Van Wert	5,178	35.22%	9,168	62.36%	355	2.42%	-3,990	-27.14%	14,701
Vinton	2,463	43.62%	3,021	53.51%	162	2.87%	-558	-9.89%	5,646
Warren	33,398	31.38%	71,691	67.36%	1,337	1.26%	-38,293	-35.98%	106,426
Washington	12,368	41.32%	17,019	56.86%	545	1.82%	-4,651	-15.54%	29,932
Wayne	21,712	41.53%	29,342	56.13%	1,222	2.34%	-7,630	-14.60%	52,276
Williams	8,174	44.43%	9,879	53.70%	343	1.87%	-1,705	-9.27%	18,396
Wood	34,285	52.61%	29,648	45.50%	1,231	1.89%	4,637	7.11%	65,164
Wyandot	4,461	40.55%	6,270	56.99%	271	2.46%	-1,809	-16.44%	11,002
Totals	2,940,044	51.38%	2,677,820	46.80%	103,967	1.82%	262,224	4.58%	5,721,831

Counties that flipped from Republican to Democratic

- Hamilton (largest municipality: Cincinnati)
- Lake (largest municipality: Mentor)
- Ottawa (largest municipality: Port Clinton)
- Sandusky (largest municipality: Fremont)
- Tuscarawas (largest municipality: New Philadelphia)
- Wood (largest municipality: Bowling Green)

=== By congressional district ===
Although Barack Obama won the state, John McCain carried ten of the state's 18 congressional districts, including three districts that simultaneously elected a Democrat. Obama carried eight districts, including one district held by a Republican.

District	Obama	McCain	Representative
1st	54.66%	44.30%	Steve Chabot (110th Congress)
1st	54.66%	44.30%	Steve Driehaus (111th Congress)
2nd	40.02%	58.61%	Jean Schmidt
3rd	47.39%	51.14%	Mike Turner
4th	38.16%	59.84%	Jim Jordan
5th	45.05%	52.95%	Paul Gillmor (110th Congress)
5th	45.05%	52.95%	Bob Latta (111th Congress)
6th	47.60%	50.30%	Charlie Wilson
7th	44.57%	53.80%	Dave Hobson (110th Congress)
7th	44.57%	53.80%	Steve Austria (111th Congress)
8th	37.87%	60.38%	John Boehner
9th	62.26%	36.17%	Marcy Kaptur
10th	59.16%	38.98%	Dennis Kucinich
11th	84.76%	14.39%	Stephanie Tubbs Jones (110th Congress)
11th	84.76%	14.39%	Marcia Fudge (111th Congress)
12th	54.15%	44.62%	Pat Tiberi
13th	54.15%	44.62%	Betty Sutton
14th	49.13%	49.35%	Steven LaTourette
15th	53.61%	44.64%	Deborah Pryce (110th Congress)
15th	53.61%	44.64%	Mary Jo Kilroy (111th Congress)
16th	47.69%	50.32%	Ralph Regula (110th Congress)
16th	47.69%	50.32%	John Boccieri (111th Congress)
17th	61.84%	36.09%	Tim Ryan
18th	44.79%	52.81%	Zack Space

== Electors ==
Technically, the voters of Ohio cast their ballots for electors: representatives to the Electoral College. Ohio is allocated 20 electors because it has 18 congressional districts and 2 senators. All candidates who appear on the ballot or qualify to receive write-in votes must submit a list of 20 electors, who pledge to vote for their candidate and their running mate. Whoever wins the majority of votes in the state is awarded all 20 electoral votes. Their chosen electors then vote for president and vice president. Although electors are pledged to their candidate and running mate, they are not obligated to vote for them. An elector who votes for someone other than their candidate is known as a faithless elector.

The electors of each state and the District of Columbia met on December 15, 2008, to cast their votes for president and vice president. The Electoral College itself never meets as one body. Instead the electors from each state and the District of Columbia met in their respective capitols.

The following were the members of the Electoral College from the state. All 20 were pledged to Barack Obama and Joe Biden:

1. Catherine Barrett
2. Barbara Tuckerman
3. Wade Kapszukiewicz
4. Tamela Lee
5. Renee Cafaro
6. Victoria Wells Wulsin
7. Craig Brown
8. Jimmy Cotner
9. Janet Carson
10. Bruce Johnson
11. Nannette Whaley
12. Martha Jane Brooks
13. Eugene Miller
14. Fran Alberty
15. Chris Redfern
16. John Kosty
17. Kelly Gillis
18. Charleta Tavares
19. Michael Todd
20. Ted Strickland

== See also ==
- United States presidential elections in Ohio
- Presidency of Barack Obama
