= 2008 United States presidential election =

Election of Barack Obama

- November 4, 2008

538 members of the Electoral College 270 electoral votes needed to win
- Opinion polls
- Turnout: 61.6% (▲1.5 pp)

Nominee	Barack Obama	John McCain
Party	Democratic	Republican
Home state	Illinois	Arizona
Running mate	Joe Biden	Sarah Palin
Electoral vote	365	173
States carried	28 + DC + NE-02	22
Popular vote	69,498,516	59,948,323
Percentage	52.9%	45.7%
- Presidential election results map. Blue denotes states won by Obama/Biden and red denotes those won by McCain/Palin. Numbers indicate electoral votes cast by each state and the District of Columbia.
President before election
George W. Bush
Republican
Elected President
Barack Obama
Democratic

A presidential election was held in the United States on November 4, 2008. The Democratic ticket of Illinois junior senator Barack Obama and Delaware senior senator Joe Biden, defeated the Republican ticket of Arizona senior senator John McCain and Alaska governor Sarah Palin. Obama became the first African American to be elected to the presidency.

Incumbent Republican president George W. Bush was ineligible to run for a third term due to the term limits established by the Twenty-second Amendment to the United States Constitution; this was the first election since 1952 in which neither the incumbent president nor vice president was on the ballot, and the first since 1928 in which neither ran for the nomination. McCain secured the Republican nomination by March 2008, defeating his main challengers Mitt Romney and Mike Huckabee, and selected Palin as his running mate. The Democratic primaries were marked by a sharp contest between Obama and the initial front-runner, former first lady and Senator Hillary Clinton, as well as other challengers who dropped out before most of the primaries were held, including Senators John Edwards and Joe Biden. Clinton's victory in the New Hampshire primary made her the first woman to win a major party's presidential primary. (Note: Shirley Chisholm had previously won a contest in New Jersey in 1972 that was a no-delegate-awarding, presidential preference ballot in which the major candidates were not listed; the actual delegate selection vote went to George McGovern.) After a long primary season, Obama narrowly secured the Democratic nomination in June 2008 and selected Biden as his running mate.

During his second term in office, Bush's popularity declined significantly, which was attributed to the growing disdain for the Iraq War, his response to Hurricane Katrina, the Abu Ghraib torture controversy, and the 2008 financial crisis. McCain opted to distance himself from Bush and did not campaign with him, nor did Bush appear in person at the 2008 Republican National Convention, although he did endorse McCain. Obama strongly opposed the Iraq War, as well as a troop surge that had begun in 2007, while McCain supported the war. Obama campaigned on the theme that "Washington must change", while McCain emphasized his experience. McCain's decision to suspend his campaign during the height of the financial crisis backfired as voters viewed his response as erratic.

Obama won a decisive victory over McCain, winning the Electoral College and popular vote by sizable margins, and flipping nine states that had voted Republican in 2004: Colorado, Florida, Indiana, Iowa, Nevada, New Mexico, North Carolina, Ohio, and Virginia, as well as Nebraska's 2nd congressional district. He also won every state in the Great Lakes region.

== Background ==
George W. Bush was the incumbent president in 2008 and his second term expired at noon on January 20, 2009

Article Two of the United States Constitution says that the president and vice president of the United States must be natural-born citizens of the United States, at least 35 years old, and residents of the United States for at least 14 years. Candidates for president typically seek the nomination of a political party, in which case each party devises a method (such as a primary election) to choose a candidate for the position. Traditionally, the primaries are indirect elections where voters cast ballots for a slate of party delegates pledged to a particular candidate. The party's delegates then officially nominate a candidate to run on the party's behalf. The general election in November is also an indirect election, where voters cast ballots for a slate of members of the Electoral College; these electors in turn directly elect the president and vice president. President George W. Bush, a Republican and former governor of Texas, was ineligible to seek reelection to a third term due to the Twenty-second Amendment; in accordance with Section 1 of the Twentieth Amendment, his term expired at noon Eastern Standard Time on January 20, 2009.

== Nominations ==
=== Democratic Party ===
==== Candidate ====
Democratic Party (United States) 2008 Democratic Party ticket
Barack Obama	Joe Biden
for President	for Vice President
U.S. Senator from Illinois (2005–2008)	U.S. Senator from Delaware (1973–2009)
Campaign

==== Withdrawn candidates ====
Candidates in this section are sorted by popular vote from the primaries
Hillary Clinton	John Edwards	Bill Richardson	Dennis Kucinich	Joe Biden	Mike Gravel	Chris Dodd	Tom Vilsack
U.S. Senator from New York (2001–2009)	U.S. Senator from North Carolina (1999–2005)	30th Governor of New Mexico (2003–2011)	U.S. Representative from Ohio (1997–2013)	U.S. Senator from Delaware (1973–2009)	U.S. Senator from Alaska (1969–1981)	U.S. Senator from Connecticut (1981–2011)	40th Governor of Iowa (1999–2007)
Campaign	Campaign	Campaign	Campaign	Campaign	Campaign	Campaign	Campaign
W: June 7; 17,493,836 votes	W: Jan 30; 1,009,331 votes	W: Jan 10; 106,356 votes	W: Jan 23; 104,000 votes	W: Jan 3; 81,777 votes	W: N/A; 40,263 votes	W: Jan 3; 35,284 votes	W: Feb 23, 2007; 0 votes

==== Before the primaries ====
Media speculation had begun almost immediately after the results of the 2004 presidential election were released. In the 2006 midterm elections, the Democrats regained majorities in both houses of the U.S. Congress. Early polls taken before anyone had announced a candidacy had shown Senators Hillary Clinton and Barack Obama as the most popular potential Democratic candidates. Nevertheless, the media speculated on several other candidates, including Al Gore, the runner-up in the 2000 election; John Kerry, the runner-up in the 2004 election; John Edwards, Kerry's running mate in 2004; Delaware Senator Joe Biden; New Mexico Governor Bill Richardson; Iowa Governor Tom Vilsack; and Indiana Senator Evan Bayh.

Edwards was one of the first to formally announce his candidacy for the presidency, on December 28, 2006. This run would be his second attempt at the presidency. Clinton announced intentions to run in the Democratic primaries on January 20, 2007. Obama announced his candidacy on February 10 in his home state of Illinois.

==== Early primaries and caucuses ====
Early in the year, the support for Barack Obama started to increase in the polls and he passed Clinton for the top spot in Iowa; he ended up winning the caucus in that state, with Edwards coming in second and Clinton in third. Obama's win was fueled mostly by first time caucus-goers and Independents and showed voters viewed him as the "candidate of change". Iowa has since been viewed as the state that jump-started Obama's campaign and set him on track to win both the nomination and the presidency. After the Iowa caucus, Biden and Connecticut Senator Chris Dodd withdrew from the nomination contest.

Obama became the new front runner in New Hampshire, when his poll numbers skyrocketed after his Iowa victory. The Clinton campaign was struggling after a huge loss in Iowa and no strategy beyond the early primaries and caucuses. According to The Vancouver Sun, campaign strategists had "mapped a victory scenario that envisioned the former first lady wrapping up the Democratic presidential nomination by Super Tuesday on Feb. 5." In what is considered a turning point for her campaign, Clinton had a strong performance at the Saint Anselm College, ABC, and Facebook debates several days before the New Hampshire primary as well as an emotional interview in a public broadcast live on TV. Clinton won that primary by 2% of the vote, contrary to the predictions of pollsters who consistently had her trailing Obama for a few days up to the primary date. Clinton's win was the first time a woman had ever won a major American party's presidential primary for the purposes of delegate selection.

On January 30, 2008, after placing in third in the New Hampshire and South Carolina primaries, Edwards announced that he was suspending his campaign for the presidency, but he did not initially endorse any remaining candidates.

==== Super Tuesday ====
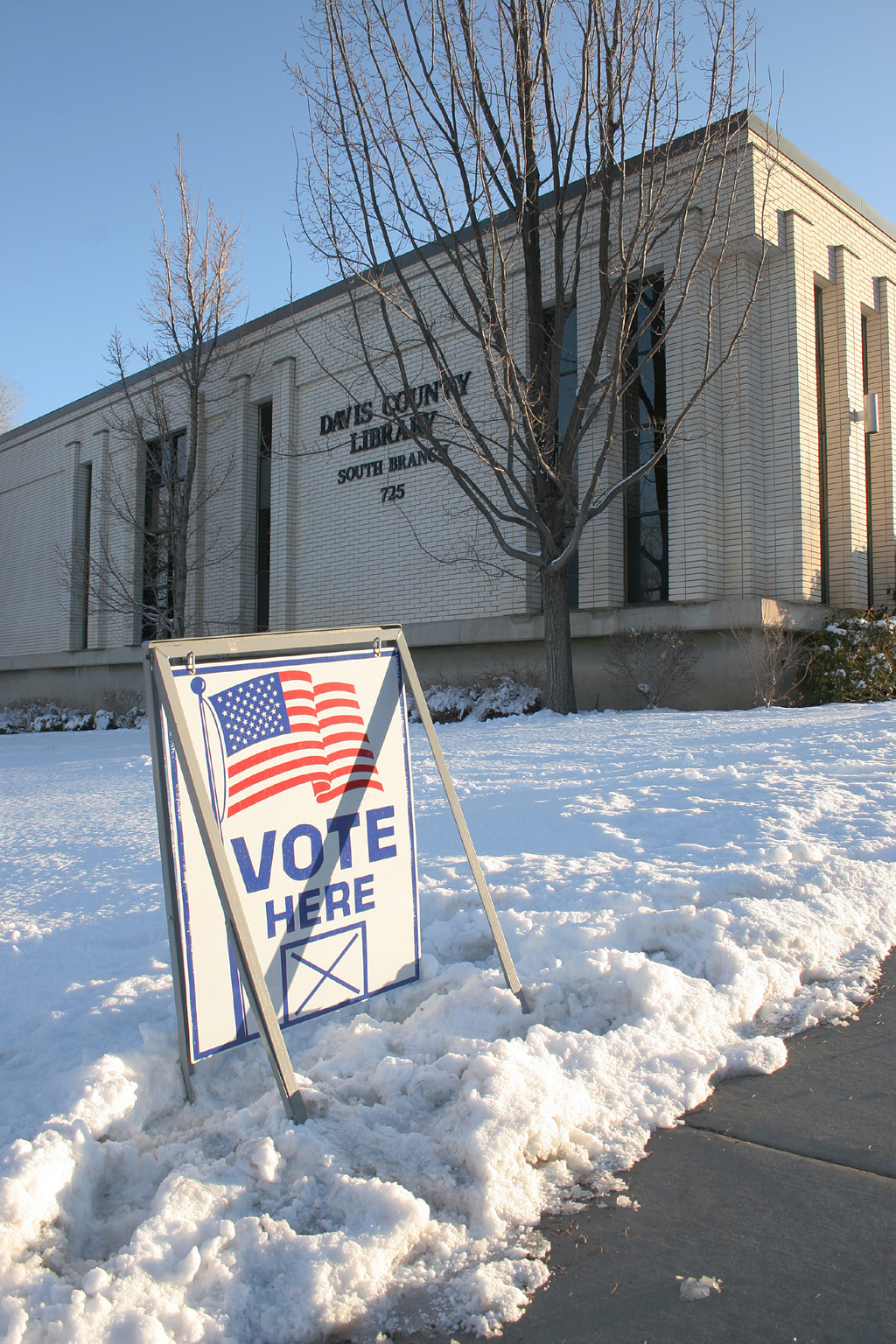
Voting sign in Utah

Super Tuesday was February 5, 2008, when the largest-ever number of simultaneous state primary elections was held. Super Tuesday ended up leaving the Democrats in a virtual tie, with Obama amassing 847 delegates to Clinton's 834 from the 23 states that held Democratic primaries.

California was one of the Super Tuesday states that could provide a large number of delegates to the candidates. Obama trailed in the California polling by an average of 6.0% before the primary; he ended up losing that state by 8.3% of the vote. Some analysts cited a large Latino turnout that voted for Clinton as the deciding factor.

The Louisiana, Nebraska, Hawaii, Wisconsin, U.S. Virgin Islands, the District of Columbia, Maryland, and Virginia primaries and the Washington and Maine caucuses all took place after Super Tuesday in February. Obama won all of them, giving him 10 consecutive victories after Super Tuesday.

==== Ohio, Texas, and Pennsylvania ====
On March 4, Hillary Clinton carried Ohio and Rhode Island in the Democratic primaries; some considered these wins, especially Ohio, a "surprise upset" by 10%, although she did lead in the polling averages in both states. She also carried the primary in Texas, but Obama won the Texas caucuses held the same day and netted more delegates from the state than Clinton.

Only one state held a primary in April. This was Pennsylvania, on April 22. Although Obama made a strong effort to win Pennsylvania, Hillary Clinton won that primary by nearly 10%, with approximately 55% of the vote. Obama had outspent Clinton three to one in Pennsylvania, but his comment at a San Francisco fundraiser that small-town Americans "cling" to guns and religion drew sharp criticism from the Clinton campaign and may have hurt his chances in the Keystone State. In addition, Clinton had several advantages in Pennsylvania. Throughout the primary process, she relied on the support of older, white, working class voters. Pennsylvania held a closed primary, which means that only registered Democrats could vote, and, according to Ron Elving of NPR, the established Democratic electorate "was older, whiter, more Catholic and more working-class than in most of the primaries to date." After Pennsylvania, Obama had a higher number of delegates and popular votes than Clinton did and was still in a stronger position to win the nomination. Clinton, however, had received the endorsement of more superdelegates than Obama.

==== Indiana and North Carolina ====
On May 6, North Carolina and Indiana held their Democratic presidential primaries. Clinton and Obama campaigned aggressively there before the voting took place. Polling had shown Obama a few points ahead in North Carolina and Clinton similarly leading in Indiana. In the actual results, Obama outperformed the polls by several points in both states, winning by a significant margin in North Carolina and losing by only 1.1% in Indiana (50.56% to 49.44%). After these primaries, most pundits declared that it had become "increasingly improbable," if not impossible, for Clinton to win the nomination. The small win in Indiana barely kept her campaign alive for the next month. Although she did manage to win the majority of the remaining primaries and delegates, it was not enough to overcome Obama's substantial delegate lead.

==== Florida and Michigan ====
During late 2007, the two parties adopted rules against states' moving their primaries to an earlier date in the year. For the Republicans, the penalty for this violation was supposed to be the loss of half the state party's delegates to the convention. The Democratic penalty was the complete exclusion from the national convention of delegates from states that broke these rules. The Democratic Party allowed only four states to hold elections before February 5, 2008. Clinton won a majority of delegates and popular votes from both states (though 40% voted uncommitted in Michigan) and subsequently led a fight to seat all the Florida and Michigan delegates.

There was some speculation that the fight over the delegates could last until the convention in August. On May 31, 2008, the Rules and Bylaws Committee of the Democratic Party reached a compromise on the Florida and Michigan delegate situation. The committee decided to seat delegates from Michigan and Florida at the convention in August, but to only award each a half-vote.

==== Clinching the nomination ====
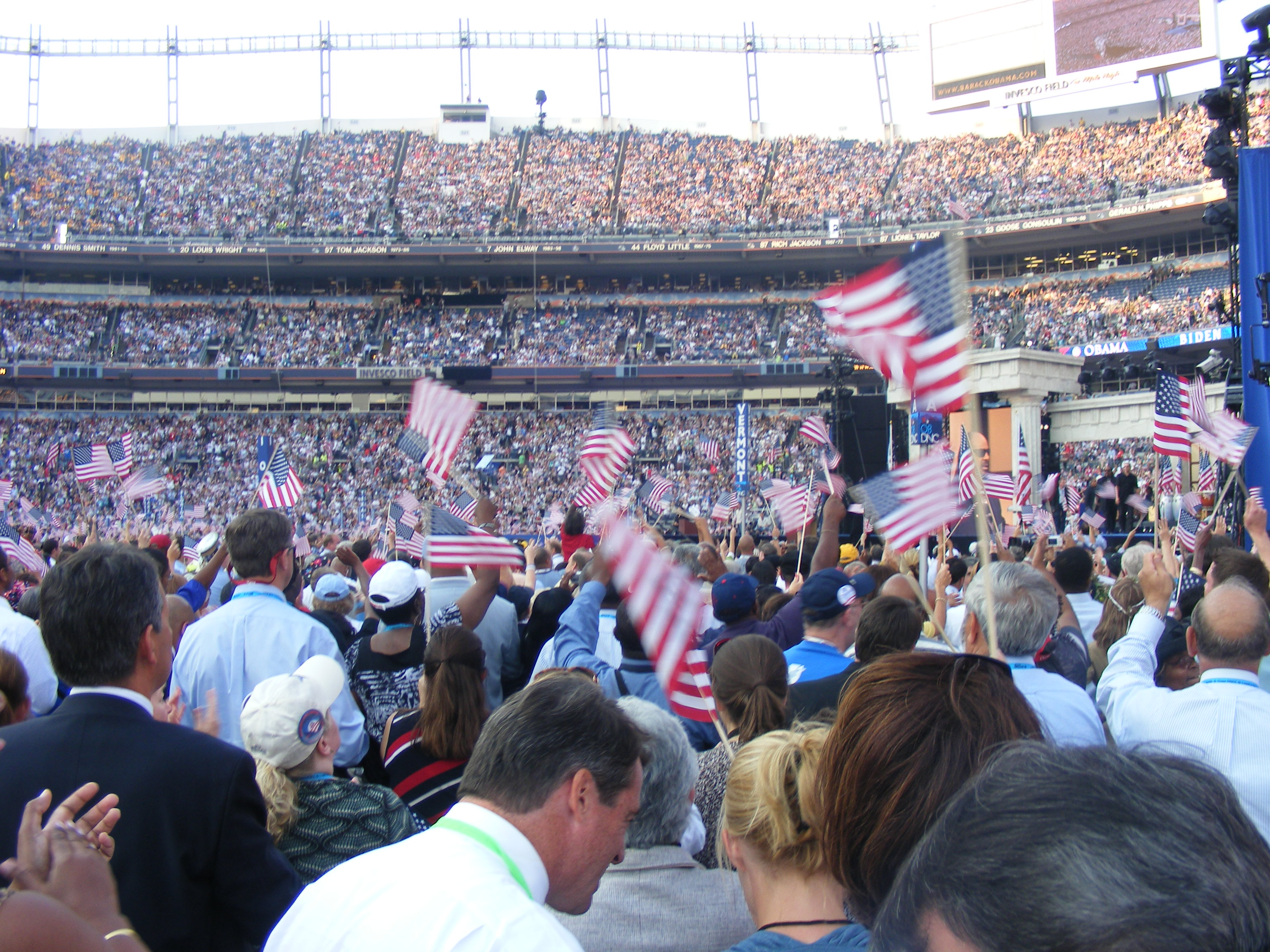
2008 DNC during Stevie Wonder's performance

The major political party nomination process (technically) continues through June of an election year. In previous cycles, the candidates were effectively chosen by the end of the primaries held in March, but, in this cycle, Barack Obama did not win enough delegates to secure the nomination until June 3, after a 17-month campaign against Hillary Clinton. He had a wide lead in states won, while Clinton had won majorities in several of the larger states. Now, because a form of proportional representation and popular vote decided Democratic state delegate contests, numbers were close between Clinton and Obama. By May, Clinton claimed to hold a lead in the popular vote, but the Associated Press found that her numbers were "accurate only" in one close scenario.

In June, after the last of the primaries had taken place, Obama secured the Democratic nomination for president, with the help of multiple super delegate endorsements (most of the super delegates had refused to declare their support for either candidate until the primaries were completed). He was the first African American to win the nomination of a major political party in the United States. For several days, Clinton refused to concede the race, although she signaled her presidential campaign was ending in a post-primary speech on June 3 in her home state of New York. She finally conceded the nomination to Obama on June 7. She pledged her full support to the presumptive nominee and vowed to do everything she could to help him get elected. Clinton would eventually become the Democratic presidential nominee 8 years later, which she then lost the general election to Donald Trump.

=== Republican Party ===
Not only was the 2008 election the first time since 1952 that neither the incumbent president nor the incumbent vice president was a candidate in the general election, but it was also the first time since the 1928 election that neither sought his party's nomination for president; as Bush was term-limited from seeking another nomination, the unique aspect was Vice President Cheney's decision not to seek the Republican nomination. The 2008 election was also the third presidential election since 1896 in which neither the incumbent president, the incumbent vice president, nor a current or former member of the incumbent president's Cabinet won the nomination of either major party the others being 1920 and 1952. With no members of the Bush administration emerging as major contenders for the Republican nomination, the Republican race was as open as the Democratic race.

==== Candidate ====
Republican Party (United States) 2008 Republican Party ticket
John McCain	Sarah Palin
for President	for Vice President
U.S. Senator from Arizona (1987–2018)	9th Governor of Alaska (2006–2009)
Campaign

==== Withdrawn candidates ====
Candidates in this section are sorted by popular vote from the primaries
Mitt Romney	Mike Huckabee	Ron Paul	Rudy Giuliani	Fred Thompson
70th Governor of Massachusetts (2003–2007)	44th Governor of Arkansas (1996–2007)	U.S. Representative from Texas (1996–2013)	107th Mayor of New York City (1994–2001)	U.S. Senator from Tennessee (1994–2003)
Campaign	Campaign	Campaign	Campaign	Campaign
W: Feb 7; 4,699,788 votes	W: March 4; 4,276,046 votes	W: June 12; 1,160,403 votes	W: Jan 30; 597,518 votes	W: Jan 22; 292,752 votes
Alan Keyes	Duncan Hunter	Tom Tancredo	Sam Brownback	Jim Gilmore
16th Assistant Secretary of State for IOA (1985–1987)	U.S. Representative from California (1981–2009)	U.S. Representative from Colorado (1999–2009)	U.S. Senator from Kansas (1996–2011)	68th Governor of Virginia (1998–2002)
Campaign	Campaign	Campaign	Campaign	Campaign
W: April 15; 59,636 votes	W: Jan 19; 39,883 votes	W: Jan 10; 8,595 votes	W: Oct 18, 2007; 2,838 votes	W: July 14, 2007; 0 votes

==== Before the primaries ====
Immediately after the 2006 midterm elections, media pundits began speculating, as they did about the Democrats, about potential Republican candidates for president in 2008. In November 2006, former New York City Mayor Rudy Giuliani led in the polls, followed closely by Arizona Senator John McCain. The media speculated that Giuliani's pro-choice stance on abortion and McCain's age and support of the unpopular Iraq War would be detriments to their candidacies. Giuliani remained the frontrunner in the polls throughout most of 2007, with McCain and former Tennessee Senator Fred Thompson fighting for second place. Arkansas Governor Mike Huckabee, Giuliani, former Massachusetts governor Mitt Romney, and Texas Representative Ron Paul announced their candidacies on January 28, February 5, February 13, and March 12, respectively. McCain officially announced his candidacy on March 1, 2007, after several informal announcements. In the third quarter of 2007, the top four GOP (Republican) fundraisers were Romney, Giuliani, Thompson, and Ron Paul. MSNBC's Chuck Todd christened Giuliani and John McCain the front runners after the second Republican presidential debate in early 2007.

==== Early primaries/caucuses ====
Huckabee, winner of Iowa, had little to no money and hoped for at least a third-place finish in New Hampshire. McCain eventually displaced Rudy Giuliani and Romney as the front runner in New Hampshire. McCain staged a turnaround victory, having been written off by the pundits and polling in single digits less than a month before the race.

With the Republicans stripping Michigan and Florida of half their delegates for moving their primaries into January 2008 against party rules, the race for the nomination was based there. McCain meanwhile managed a small victory over Huckabee in South Carolina, setting him up for a larger and more important victory over Romney in Florida, which held a closed primary on January 29. By this time, after several scandals, no success in the early primaries, and a third-place finish in Florida, Giuliani conceded the nomination and endorsed John McCain the next day.

==== Super Tuesday ====
McCain was also endorsed in February by California Governor Arnold Schwarzenegger before the California primary took place on Super Tuesday. This gave him a significant boost in the polls for the state's primary, which awarded the greatest number of delegates of all the states. On Super Tuesday, McCain won his home state of Arizona, taking all 53 delegates. He also won nearly all of California's 173 delegates, the largest of the Super Tuesday prizes. McCain also scored wins in seven other states, picking up 574 delegates. Huckabee was the "surprise performer", winning 5 states and 218 delegates. Romney won 7 states and 231 delegates. Two days later, Romney suspended his presidential campaign, saying that if he stayed in the race, he would "forestall the launch of a national campaign and be making it easier for Senator Clinton or Obama to win". His departure left Huckabee and Paul as McCain's only major challengers in the remaining primaries and caucuses. Romney endorsed McCain on February 14.

Louisiana, the District of Columbia, Kansas, Wisconsin, and Washington held primaries in February after Super Tuesday. Despite McCain picking up big victories, Huckabee won Louisiana and Kansas. McCain narrowly carried the Washington caucuses over Huckabee and Paul, who amassed a large showing. The Virgin Islands and Puerto Rico closed February for the Republicans. After Super Tuesday, John McCain had become the clear front runner, but by the end of February, he still had not acquired enough delegates to secure the nomination. In March, John McCain clinched the Republican nomination after sweeping all four primaries, Texas, Ohio, Vermont, and Rhode Island, putting him over the top of the 1,191 delegates required to win the GOP nomination. Mike Huckabee then conceded the race to McCain, leaving Ron Paul, who had just 16 delegates, as his only remaining opponent. Romney would eventually become the Republican presidential nominee 4 years later, which he then lost the general election to incumbent President Barack Obama.

=== Third party and other nominations ===
Along with the Democratic and Republican parties, three other parties nominated candidates with ballot access in enough states to win the minimum 270 electoral votes needed to win the election. These were the Constitution Party, the Green Party, and the Libertarian Party. In addition, independent candidate Ralph Nader ran his own campaign.

The Constitution Party nominated writer, pastor, and conservative talk show host Chuck Baldwin for president, and attorney Darrell Castle from Tennessee for vice president. While campaigning, Baldwin voiced his opposition to the Iraq War, the Sixteenth Amendment, Roe v. Wade, the IRS, and the Federal Reserve.

The Green Party nominated former Democratic representative Cynthia McKinney from Georgia for president, and political activist Rosa Clemente from New York for vice president. McKinney campaigned on a platform that supported single-payer universal health care, the withdrawal of American troops from Iraq and Afghanistan, reparations for African Americans, and the creation of a Department of Peace.

The Libertarian Party nominated former Republican representative Bob Barr from Georgia for president, and his former rival for the Libertarian nomination Wayne Allyn Root from Nevada, for vice president. During the 2008 presidential campaign, Barr advocated a reworking or abolition of the income tax and opposed the war in Iraq and the Patriot Act.

==== Candidates gallery ====
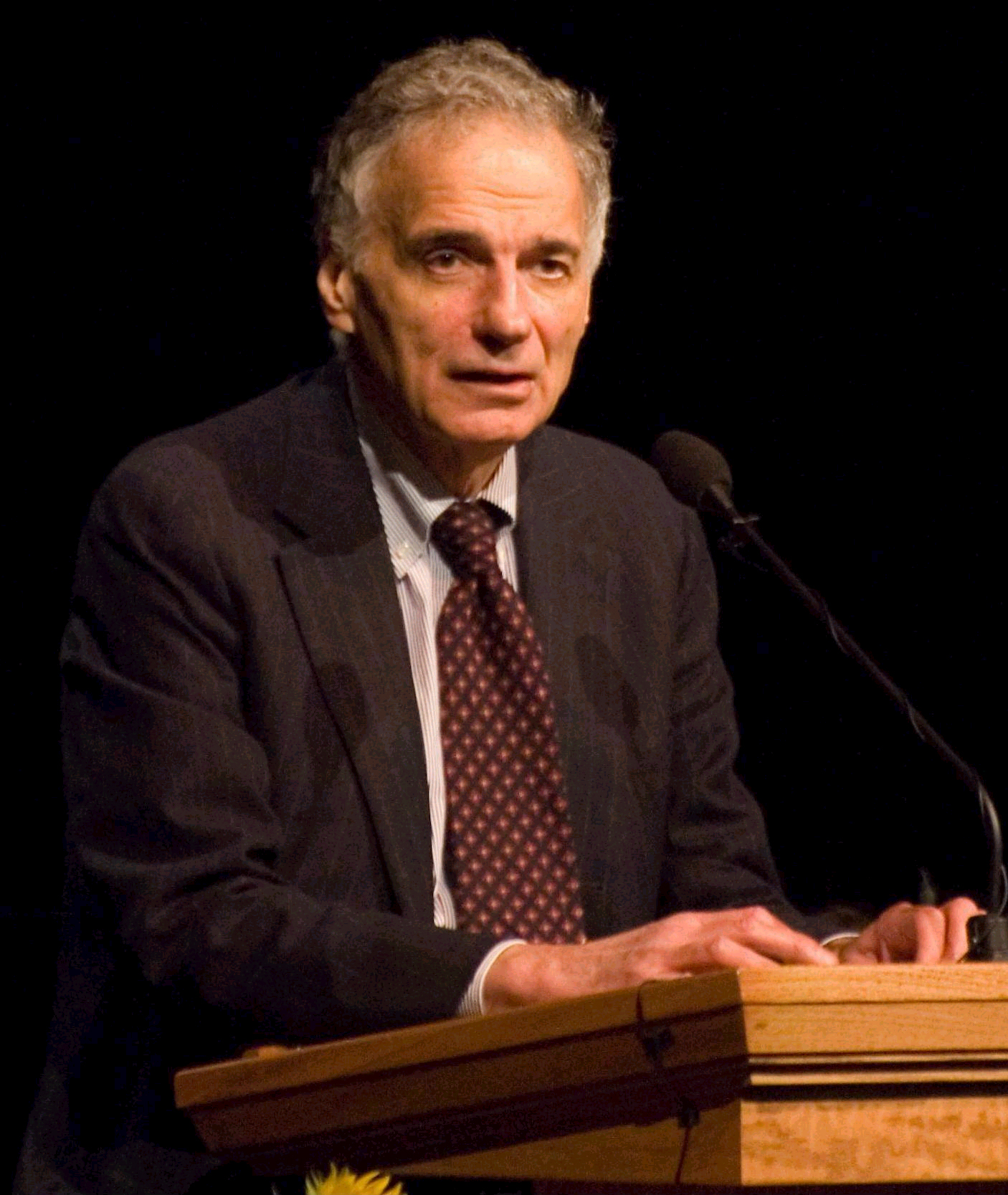
Independent:
Attorney
Ralph Nader
from Connecticut
(campaign)

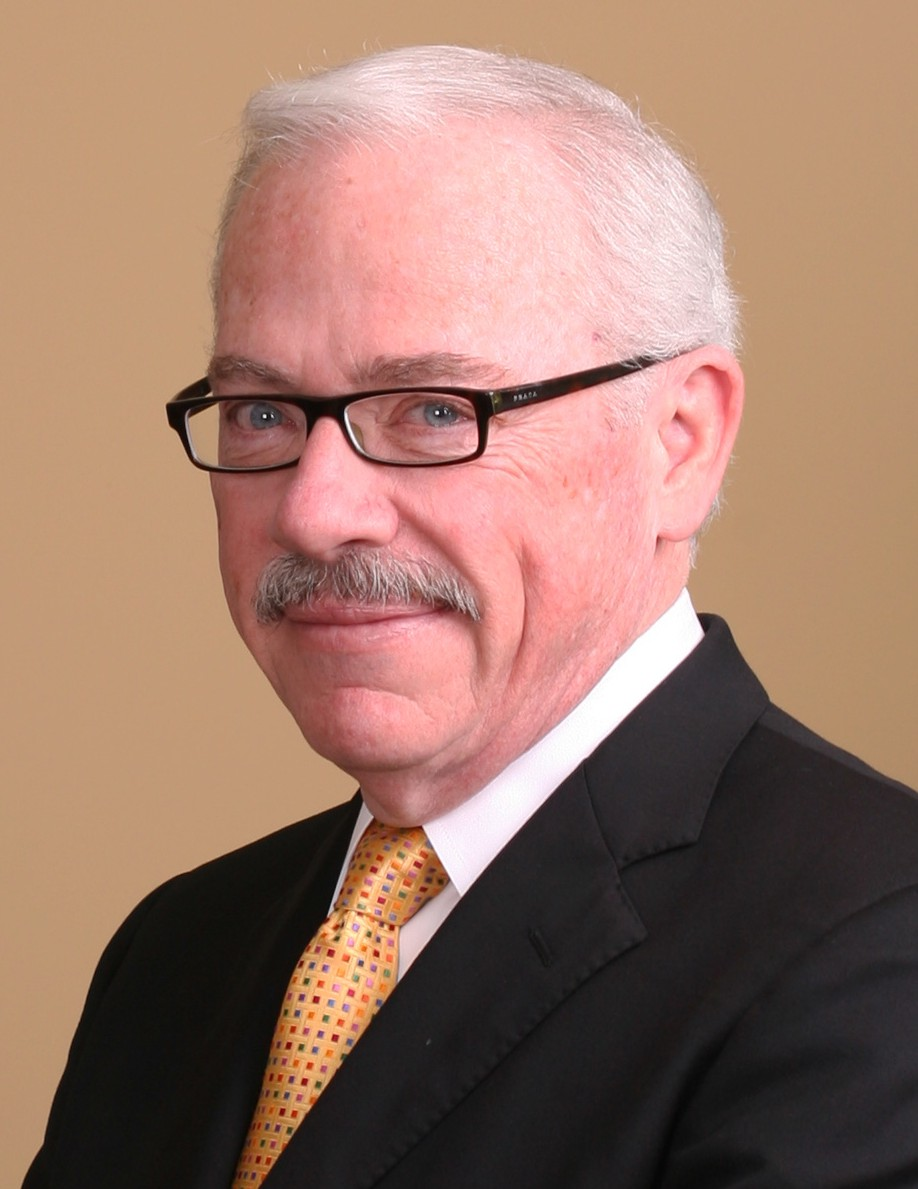
Libertarian Party:
Former Representative
Bob Barr
from Georgia
(campaign)

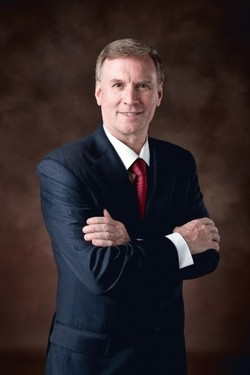
Constitution Party:
Former Pastor
Chuck Baldwin
from Florida
(campaign)

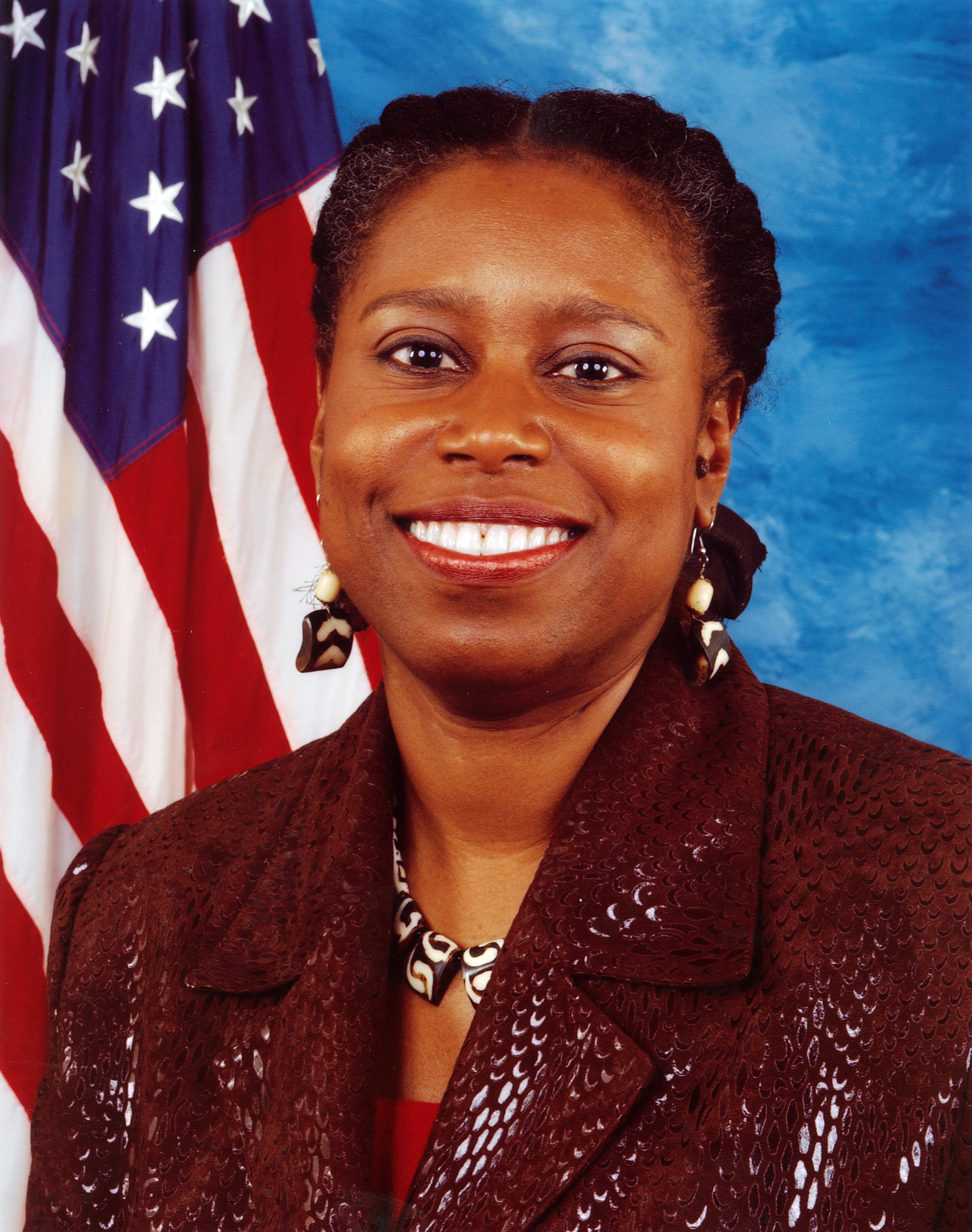
Green Party:
Former Representative
Cynthia McKinney
from Georgia
(campaign)

=== Party conventions ===
Sites of the 2008 National Party Conventions
- April 23–26, 2008: 2008 Constitution Party National Convention held in Kansas City, Missouri.
- May 23–26, 2008: 2008 Libertarian National Convention, held in Denver, Colorado.
- July 10–13, 2008: 2008 Green Party National Convention, held in Chicago, Illinois.
- August 25–28, 2008: 2008 Democratic National Convention, held in Denver, Colorado.
- September 1–4, 2008: 2008 Republican National Convention, held in Saint Paul, Minnesota.

== General election campaign ==
=== Issues ===
==== Iraq ====
Until the onset of the 2008 financial crisis, the unpopular Iraq War was a key issue during the campaign. John McCain supported the war while Barack Obama opposed it (Obama's early and strong opposition to the war helped him stand out against the other Democratic candidates during the primaries, as well as stand out to a war-weary electorate during the general campaign). Though McCain meant it as a peacetime presence like the United States maintained in Germany and Japan after World War II, his statement that the United States could be in Iraq for as much as the next 50 to 100 years would prove costly. Obama used it against him as part of his strategy to tie him to the unpopular President Bush.

John McCain's support for the troop 'surge' employed by General David Petraeus, which was one of several factors credited with improving the security situation in Iraq, may have boosted McCain's stance on the issue in voters' minds. McCain (who supported the invasion) argued that his support for the successful surge showed his superior judgment. However, Obama was quick to remind voters that there would have been no need for a "surge" had there been no war at all, thus questioning McCain's judgment.

==== Bush's unpopularity ====
George W. Bush had become increasingly unpopular among Americans by late 2005 due in part by the growing unpopularity of the Iraq War domestically and internationally, as well as Bush's handling of the 2008 financial crisis and Hurricane Katrina in 2005. By the time Obama was elected as President of the United States on November 4, 2008, Bush's approval rating was in the low to mid 20s and his disapproval grew increasingly significant, being in the high 60s, and even low 70s in some polls. Polls consistently showed that his approval ratings among American voters had averaged around 30 percent. In March 2008, Bush endorsed McCain at the White House, but did not make a single appearance for McCain during the campaign. Bush appeared at the 2008 GOP convention only through a live video broadcast. He chose not to appear in person due to disaster events in the Gulf of Mexico in the aftermath of Hurricane Gustav. Although he supported the war in Iraq, McCain made an effort to show that he had disagreed with Bush on many other key issues such as climate change. During the entire general election campaign, Obama countered by pointing out in ads and at numerous campaign rallies that McCain had claimed in an interview that he voted with Bush 90% of the time, and congressional voting records supported this for the years Bush was in office.

==== Age issue ====
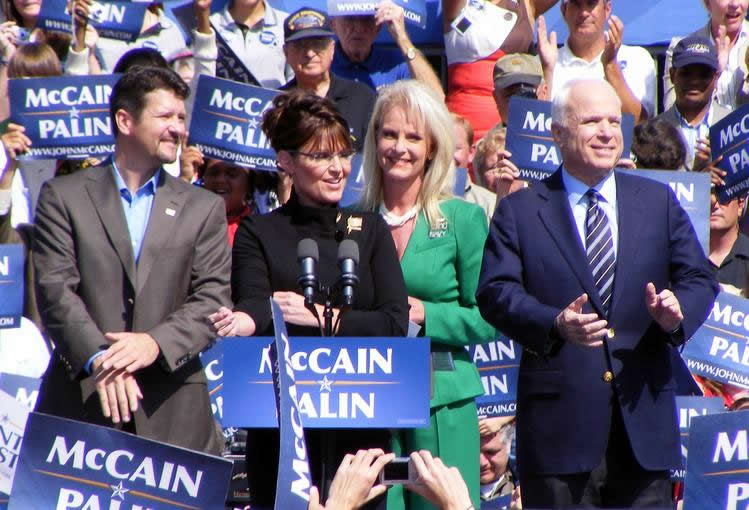
The Palins and McCains campaigning in Fairfax, Virginia, September 10, 2008, following the Republican National Convention

Similar to Senator Bob Dole's 1996 presidential campaign, one of the more widely leveled charges against McCain was the issue of his age—he turned 72 in August and there was widespread concern about the idea of electing a man who would be 80 years old if he completed two full terms in office (the oldest president, Ronald Reagan, had been a month shy of 78 when he left office in January 1989). In addition, McCain suffered from the ill effects of his captivity in North Vietnam and reportedly had difficulty lifting his arms above his head. His age in particular was considered a liability against the youthful Senator Obama, who was nearly twenty-five years his junior. McCain, by comparison, was born before World War II and belonged to the Silent Generation. Much like Bob Dole, McCain attempted to counter these charges by releasing all of his medical records, something Obama did not do. McCain's wife Cindy dismissed concerns about his health by arguing that "We went hiking the Grand Canyon last summer and [John] did great and had no trouble keeping up with us." McCain also appeared at several campaign stops with his still-active 95-year-old mother. In a speech on the House floor, Pennsylvania Congressman John Murtha criticized McCain's age by saying "Seven presidents have come and gone since I've been in Congress, and I saw the toll the job took on each one of them." If elected, McCain would have been the first president born in the 1930s. McCain ultimately died in 2018, just one year after the completion of Obama's second term.

Like the Clinton campaign in 1996, Obama avoided discussing McCain's age directly, instead preferring to simply call his ideas and message "old" and "old hat". He also made a strong appeal to youth voters and back during his primary contest with Hillary Clinton, had stated "When I watched the feud between the Clintons and [Newt Gingrich] unfold during the 1990s, I was reminded of old quarrels started on college campuses long ago. It's time for a new generation to take over." Obama's active use of a Blackberry and other modern technology also stood in contrast to the Arizona Senator's admission that he was an infrequent user of email and the internet. McCain's service in Vietnam, while marketable to baby boomers, was referred to as "unimportant" to younger voters.

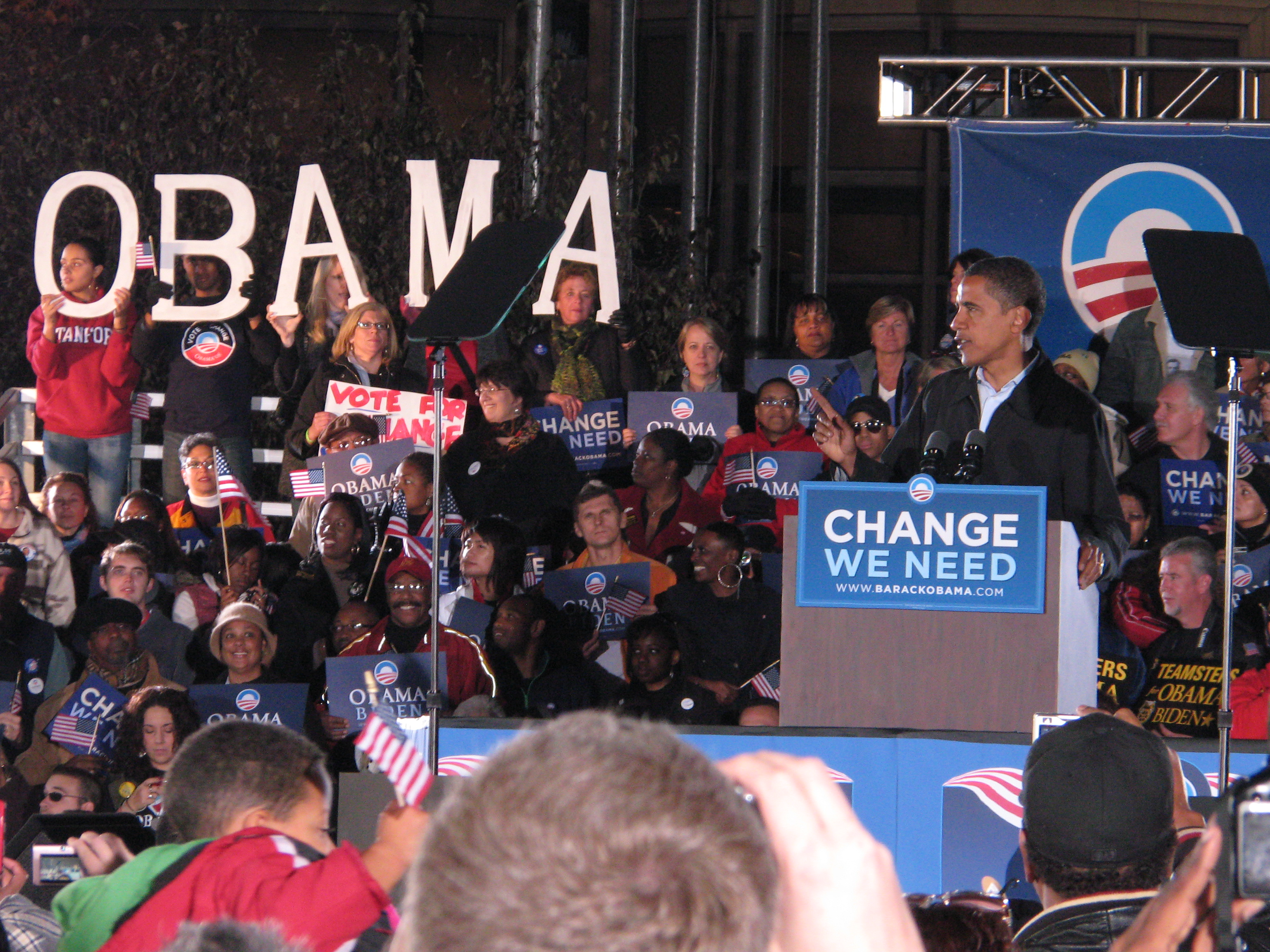
Obama campaigning as a symbol of change in Cleveland, Ohio with a "Change We Need" sign

Obama promised "universal health care, full employment, a green America, and an America respected instead of feared by its enemies".

Polls regularly found the general electorate as a whole divided more evenly between 'change' and 'experience' as candidate qualities than the Democratic primary electorate, which split in favor of 'change' by a nearly 2–1 margin. Advantages for McCain and Obama on experience and the ability to bring change, respectively, remained steady through the November 4 election. However, final pre-election polling found that voters considered Obama's inexperience less of an impediment than McCain's association with sitting president George W. Bush, an association which was rhetorically framed by the Obama campaign throughout the election season as "more of the same".

McCain appeared to undercut his line of attack by picking first-term Alaska governor Sarah Palin to be his running mate. Palin had been governor only since 2006, and before that had been a council member and mayor of Wasilla. The choice of Palin was controversial; however, it appeared to solve two pressing concerns—McCain's age and health (since a youthful vice president would succeed him to office if he died or became incapacitated) and appealing to right-wing conservatives, a group that had been comparatively unmoved by McCain. Palin also came off as more down-to-earth and relatable to average Americans than McCain, widely criticized as a "Beltway insider". However, media interviews suggested that Palin lacked knowledge on certain key issues, and they cast doubt among many voters about her qualifications to be vice president or president. In this regard, her inexperience was also a liability when McCain's age and health were factored in—there was a higher-than-normal probability of Palin succeeding to the presidency. "One 72-year-old heartbeat away from the presidency" became a popular anti-GOP slogan. She also came under attack on everything from her 17-year-old daughter giving birth to a child out of wedlock to actively participating in hunting moose and other animals. Because of Palin's conservative views, there was also concern that she would alienate independents and moderates, two groups that pundits observed McCain would need to win the election.

==== Economy ====
Polls taken in the last few months of the presidential campaign and exit polls conducted on Election Day showed the economy as the top concern for voters. In the fall of 2008, many news sources were reporting that the economy was suffering its most serious downturn since the Great Depression. During this period, John McCain's election prospects fell with several politically costly comments about the economy.

On August 20, John McCain said in an interview with Politico that he was uncertain how many houses he and his wife, Cindy, owned; "I think—I'll have my staff get to you," he told the media outlet. Both on the stump and in Obama's political ad, "Seven", the gaffe was used to portray McCain as somebody unable to relate to the concerns of ordinary Americans. This out-of-touch image was further cultivated when, on September 15, the day of the Lehman Brothers bankruptcy, at a morning rally in Jacksonville, Florida, McCain declared that "the fundamentals of our economy are strong," despite what he described as "tremendous turmoil in our financial markets and Wall Street." With the perception among voters to the contrary, the comment appeared to cost McCain politically.

On September 24, 2008, after the onset of the 2008 financial crisis, McCain announced that he was suspending his campaign to return to Washington so he could help craft a $700 billion bailout package for the troubled financial industry, and he stated that he would not debate Obama until Congress passed the bailout bill. Despite this decision, McCain was portrayed as somebody not playing a significant role in the negotiations for the first version of the bill, which fell short of passage in the House. He eventually decided to attend the first presidential debate on September 26, despite Congress' lack of immediate action on the bill. His ineffectiveness in the negotiations and his reversal in decision to attend the debates were seized upon to portray McCain as erratic in his response to the economy. Days later, a second version of the original bailout bill was passed by both the House and Senate, with Obama, his vice presidential running mate Joe Biden, and McCain all voting for the measure (Hillary Clinton would as well).

All the aforementioned remarks and campaign issues hurt McCain's standing with voters. All these also occurred after the onset of the 2008 financial crisis and after McCain's poll numbers had started to fall. Although sound bites of all of these "missteps" were played repeatedly on national television, many pundits and analysts say that the actual financial crisis and economic conditions caused McCain's large drop in support in mid-September and severely damaged his campaign.

==== Health care ====
John McCain's proposals focused on open-market competition rather than government funding or control. At the heart of his plan were tax credits – $2,500 for individuals and $5,000 for families who do not subscribe to or do not have access to health care through their employer. To help people who are denied coverage by insurance companies due to pre-existing conditions, McCain proposed working with states to create what he calls a "Guaranteed Access Plan".

Barack Obama called for universal health care. His health care plan proposed creating a National Health Insurance Exchange that would include both private insurance plans and a Medicare-like government run option. Coverage would be guaranteed regardless of health status, and premiums would not vary based on health status either. It would have required parents to cover their children, but did not require adults to buy insurance.

Critics of McCain's plan argued that it would not significantly reduce the number of uninsured Americans, would increase costs, reduce consumer protections and lead to less generous benefit packages. Critics of Obama's plan argued that it would increase federal regulation of private health insurance without addressing the underlying incentives behind rising health care spending. Mark Pauly suggested that a combination of the two approaches would work better than either one alone.

A poll released in early November 2008 found that voters supporting Obama listed health care as their second priority; voters supporting McCain listed it as fourth, tied with the war in Iraq. Affordability was the primary health care priority among both sets of voters. Obama voters were more likely than McCain voters to believe government can do much about health care costs.

=== Presidential debates ===
The United States presidential election of 2008 was sponsored by the Commission on Presidential Debates (CPD), a bipartisan organization that sponsored four debates that occurred at various locations around the United States (U.S.) in September and October 2008. Three of the debates involved the presidential nominees, and one involved the vice-presidential nominees.

Debates among candidates for the 2008 U.S. presidential election
No.	Date	Time	Host	City	Moderators	Participants	Viewership (millions)
P1	Friday, September 26, 2008	9:00 pm EDT	University of Mississippi	Oxford, Mississippi	Jim Lehrer of PBS	Senator Barack Obama; Senator John McCain	52.4
VP	Friday, October 3, 2008	9:00 pm EDT	Washington University in St. Louis	St. Louis, Missouri	Gwen Ifill of PBS	Senator Joe Biden; Governor Sarah Palin	69.9
P2	Tuesday, October 7, 2008	9:00 pm EDT	Belmont University	Nashville, Tennessee	Tom Brokaw of NBC	Senator Barack Obama; Senator John McCain	63.2
P3	Wednesday, October 15, 2008	9:00 pm EDT	Hofstra University	Hempstead, New York	Bob Schieffer of CBS	Senator Barack Obama; Senator John McCain	56.5

Sites of the 2008 general election debates

Another debate was sponsored by the Columbia University political union and took place there on October 19. All candidates who could theoretically win the 270 electoral votes needed to win the election were invited, and Ralph Nader, Cynthia McKinney, and Chuck Baldwin agreed to attend. Amy Goodman, principal host of Democracy Now!, moderated. It was broadcast on cable by C-SPAN and on the Internet by Break-the-Matrix.

=== Campaign costs ===
The reported cost of campaigning for president has increased significantly in recent years. One source reported that if the costs for both Democratic and Republican campaigns were added together (for the presidential primary election, general election, and the political conventions), the costs have more than doubled in only eight years ($448.9 million in 1996, $649.5 million in 2000, and $1.01 billion in 2004). In January 2007, Federal Election Commission Chairman Michael E. Toner estimated that the 2008 race would be a $1 billion election, and that to be taken seriously, a candidate would have needed to raise at least $100 million by the end of 2007.

==== Expense summary ====
According to required campaign filings as reported by the Federal Election Commission (FEC), 148 candidates for all parties collectively raised $1,644,712,232 and spent $1,601,104,696 for the primary and general campaigns combined through November 24, 2008. The amounts raised and spent by the major candidates, according to the same source, were as follows:

Candidate (party)	Amount raised	Amount spent	Votes	Average spent per vote
Barack Obama (D)	$778,642,962	$760,370,195	69,498,516	$10.94
John McCain (R)	$379,006,485	$346,666,422	59,948,323	$5.78
Ralph Nader (I)	$4,496,180	$4,187,628	739,034	$5.67
Bob Barr (L)	$1,383,681	$1,345,202	523,715	$2.57
Chuck Baldwin (C)	$261,673	$234,309	199,750	$1.17
Cynthia McKinney (G)	$240,130	$238,968	161,797	$1.48
Excludes spending by independent expenditure concerns. Source: Federal Election Commission

=== Notable expressions and phrases ===
- Drill, baby, drill: Republican self-described energy policy
- Yes We Can: Obama's campaign slogan
- That one: McCain's reference to Obama during the 2nd debate.
- Lipstick on a pig: Obama used this phrase to insinuate that any changes that McCain was advocating from the policies of George W. Bush would only be slight modifications of Bush's policies but the underlying policies would be the same, and in Obama's opinion, bad. Some called it sexist, claiming it was a reference to Sarah Palin, who cracked a joke during the Republican convention that the only difference between a hockey mom and a pit bull is lipstick.

=== Electoral College forecasts ===
Elections analysts and political pundits issue probabilistic forecasts of the composition of the Electoral College. These forecasts use a variety of factors to estimate the likelihood of each candidate winning the Electoral College electors for that state. Most election predictors use the following ratings:

- "tossup": no advantage
- "tilt" (used by some predictors): advantage that is not quite as strong as "lean"
- "lean" or "leans": slight advantage
- "likely": significant, but surmountable, advantage
- "safe" or "solid": near-certain chance of victory

Below is a list of states considered competitive by at least one of The Cook Political Report, RealClearPolitics, and FiveThirtyEight; states that are deemed to be "safe" or "solid" by all three forecasters are excluded.

State	EVs	RealClearPolitics November 4, 2008	538 November 4, 2008	Cook Political Report November 4, 2008
Arkansas	11	Lean R	Safe R	Safe R
Arizona	10	Lean R	Tossup	Safe R
Colorado	9	Lean D (flip)	Lean D (flip)	Safe D (flip)
Georgia	15	Tossup	Tossup	Lean R
Florida	27	Tossup	Tossup	Lean D (flip)
Iowa	7	Safe D (flip)	Lean D (flip)	Safe D (flip)
Indiana	11	Tossup	Tossup	Lean R
Michigan	17	Safe D	Lean D	Safe D
Minnesota	10	Safe D	Lean D	Safe D
Montana	3	Tossup	Tossup	Tossup
Missouri	11	Lean R	Solid R	Safe R
Nevada	5	Lean D (flip)	Lean D (flip)	Lean D (flip)
New Mexico	5	Lean D (flip)	Lean D (flip)	Safe D (flip)
North Dakota	3	Tossup	Tossup	Safe R
North Carolina	15	Tossup	Tossup	Tossup
Ohio	20	Tossup	Tossup	Lean D (flip)
Pennsylvania	21	Lean D	Lean D	Lean D
South Dakota	3	Lean R	Tossup	Safe R
West Virginia	5	Lean R	Lean R	Lean R
Virginia	13	Tossup	Lean D (flip)	Lean D (flip)

== Internet campaigns ==
=== Fundraising ===
Howard Dean collected large contributions through the Internet in his 2004 primary run. In 2008, candidates went even further to reach out to Internet users through their own sites and such sites as YouTube, MySpace, and Facebook.

On December 16, 2007, Ron Paul collected $6 million, more money on a single day through Internet donations than any presidential candidate in US history.

=== Promotion ===
The 2008 election was the first time that a majority of the voting-age population preferred to get their news from the Internet. Not only did the Internet allow candidates to raise money, but also it gave them a tool to appeal to newer and younger demographics. Political pundits were now evaluating candidates based on their social media following. Senator Barack Obama's victory is credited to his competitive edge in social media and Internet following. Obama had over 2 million American supporters on Facebook and 100,000 followers on Twitter, while McCain attracted only 600,000 Facebook supporters (likes) and 4,600 followers on Twitter. Obama's YouTube channel held 115,000 subscribers and more than 97 million video views. Obama had maintained a similar advantage over Senator Hillary Clinton in the Democratic primary.

Obama's edge in social media was crucial to the election outcome. According to a study by the Pew Internet and American Life project, 35 percent of Americans relied on online video for election news. Ten percent of Americans used social networking sites to learn about the election. The 2008 election showed huge increases in Internet use.

Another study done after the election gave a lot of insight on young voters. Thirty-seven percent of Americans ages 18–24 got election news from social networking sites. Almost a quarter of Americans saw something about the election in an online video. YouTube and other online video outlets allowed candidates to advertise in ways like never before. The Republican Party in particular was criticized for not adequately using social media and other means to reach young voters.

Anonymous and semi-anonymous smear campaigns, traditionally done with fliers and push calling, also spread to the Internet. Organizations specializing in the production and distribution of viral material, such as Brave New Films, emerged; such organizations have been said to be having a growing influence on American politics.

== Controversies ==
=== Voter suppression allegations ===
Allegations of voter list purges using unlawful criteria caused controversy in at least six swing states: Colorado, Indiana, Ohio, Michigan, Nevada and North Carolina. On October 5, 2008, the Republican Lt. Governor of Montana, John Bohlinger, accused the Montana Republican Party of vote caging to purge 6,000 voters from three counties which trend Democratic. Allegations arose in Michigan that the Republican Party planned to challenge the eligibility of voters based on lists of foreclosed homes. The campaign of Democratic presidential nominee Barack Obama filed a lawsuit challenging this. The House Judiciary Committee wrote to the Department of Justice requesting an investigation.

Libertarian candidate Bob Barr filed a lawsuit in Texas to have Obama and McCain removed from the ballot in that state. His campaign alleged that both of the candidates had missed the August 26 deadline to file and had been included on the ballot in violation of Texas election law. Neither Obama nor McCain had been confirmed as the candidate of their respective parties at the time of the deadline. The Texas Supreme Court dismissed the lawsuit without explanation.

In Ohio, identified by both parties as a key state, allegations surfaced from both Republicans and Democrats that individuals from out of state were moving to the state temporarily and attempting to vote despite not meeting the state's requirement of permanent residency for more than 29 days. The Franklin County Board of Elections referred 55 cases of possible voting irregularities to the local prosecutor. Three groups attracted particular notice: 'Vote from Home,' 'Vote Today Ohio,' and 'Drop Everything and Come to Ohio.' Vote from Home attracted the most attention when thirteen of the group's members moved to the same location in eastern Columbus. Members of the group organized by Marc Gustafson, including several Marshall and Rhodes scholars studying at Oxford University, settled with Franklin County Prosecutor Ron O'Brien to have their challenged ballots withdrawn. The Obama campaign and others alleged that members of the McCain campaign had also voted without properly establishing residency. Since 1953, only six people in Ohio have gone to prison for illegal voting.

=== Media bias ===
Republicans and independents leveled significant criticism at media outlets' coverage of the presidential election season. An October 22, 2008 Pew Research Center poll estimated 70% of registered voters believed journalists wanted Barack Obama to win the election, as opposed to 9% for John McCain. Another Pew survey, conducted after the election, found that 67% of voters thought that the press fairly covered Obama, versus 30% who viewed the coverage as unfair. Regarding McCain, 53% of voters viewed his press coverage as fair versus 44% who characterized it as unfair. Among affiliated Democrats, 83% believed the press fairly covered Obama; just 22% of Republicans thought the press was fair to McCain.

At the February debate, Tim Russert of NBC News was criticized for what some perceived as disproportionately tough questioning of Democratic presidential contender Hillary Clinton. Among the questions, Russert had asked Clinton, but not Obama, to provide the name of the new Russian President (Dmitry Medvedev). This was later parodied on Saturday Night Live. In October 2007, liberal commentators accused Russert of harassing Clinton over the issue of supporting drivers' licenses for illegal immigrants.

On April 16, ABC News hosted a debate in Philadelphia, Pennsylvania. Moderators Charles Gibson and George Stephanopoulos were criticized by viewers, bloggers and media critics for the poor quality of their questions. Many viewers said they considered some of the questions irrelevant when measured against the importance of the faltering economy or the Iraq War. Included in that category were continued questions about Obama's former pastor, Senator Hillary Clinton's assertion that she had to duck sniper fire in Bosnia more than a decade prior, and Senator Obama's not wearing an American flag pin. The moderators focused on campaign gaffes and some believed they focused too much on Obama. Stephanopoulos defended their performance, saying "Senator Obama was the front-runner" and the questions were "not inappropriate or irrelevant at all."

In an op-ed published on April 27, 2008, in The New York Times, Elizabeth Edwards wrote that the media covered much more of "the rancor of the campaign" and "amount of money spent" than "the candidates' priorities, policies and principles." Author Erica Jong commented that "our press has become a sea of triviality, meanness and irrelevant chatter." A Gallup poll released on May 29, 2008, also estimated that more Americans felt the media was being harder on Hillary Clinton than they were towards Barack Obama. Time magazine columnist Mark Halperin stated that the media during the 2008 election had a "blind, almost slavish" worship of Obama.

The Project for Excellence in Journalism and Harvard University's Joan Shorenstein Center on the Press, Politics and Public Policy conducted a study of 5,374 media narratives and assertions about the presidential candidates from January 1 through March 9, 2008. The study found that Obama received 69% favorable coverage and Clinton received 67%, compared to only 43% favorable media coverage of McCain. Another study by the Center for Media and Public Affairs at George Mason University found the media coverage of Obama to be 72% negative from June 8 to July 21 compared to 57% negative for McCain. An October 29 study found 29% of stories about Obama to be negative, compared to 57% of stories about McCain being negative.

== Conduct ==
Final poll closing times on Election Day. 7PM EST [00:00 UTC] (6) 7:30PM EST [00:30 UTC] (3) 8PM EST [01:00 UTC] (15+DC) 8:30PM EST [01:30 UTC] (1) 9PM EST [02:00 UTC] (15) 10PM EST [03:00 UTC] (4) 11PM EST [04:00 UTC] (5) 1AM EST [06:00 UTC] (1)

Election Day was on November 4, 2008. The majority of states allowed early voting, with all states allowing some form of absentee voting. Voters cast votes for listed presidential candidates but were actually selecting representatives for their state's Electoral College slate.

A McCain victory quickly became improbable as Obama amassed early wins in his home state of Illinois, the Northeast, and the critical battleground states of Ohio and Pennsylvania by 9:30 pm Eastern Standard Time. Obama won the entire Northeast by comfortable margins and the Great Lakes states of Michigan, Wisconsin, and Minnesota by double digits. McCain held on to traditionally Republican states like North Dakota, South Dakota, Nebraska (though notably, Obama did win an electoral vote from Nebraska's 2nd congressional district), Kansas, Oklahoma, Montana, Utah, Idaho, Wyoming, and his home state of Arizona. Out of the southern states, Obama won Florida, North Carolina, Delaware, Maryland, and Virginia. Obama also won the hotly contested states of Iowa and New Mexico, which Al Gore had won in 2000 and George W. Bush in 2004. Also, for only the second time since 1936 (1964 being the other), Indiana went Democratic, giving Obama all eight Great Lakes states, the first time a presidential candidate had won all of them since Richard Nixon in 1972.

CNN and Fox News called Virginia for Obama shortly before 11:00 pm, leaving him only 50 electoral votes shy of victory with only six West Coast states (California, Oregon, Washington, Idaho, Alaska, and Hawaii) still voting. All American networks called the election in favor of Obama at 11:00 pm as the polls closed on the West Coast. Obama was immediately declared the winner in California, Oregon, Washington, and Hawaii, McCain won Idaho, and the Electoral College totals were updated to 297 for Obama and 146 for McCain (270 are needed to win). McCain gave a concession speech half an hour later in his hometown of Phoenix, Arizona. Obama appeared just before midnight Eastern Time in Grant Park, Chicago, in front of a crowd of 250,000 people to deliver his victory speech.

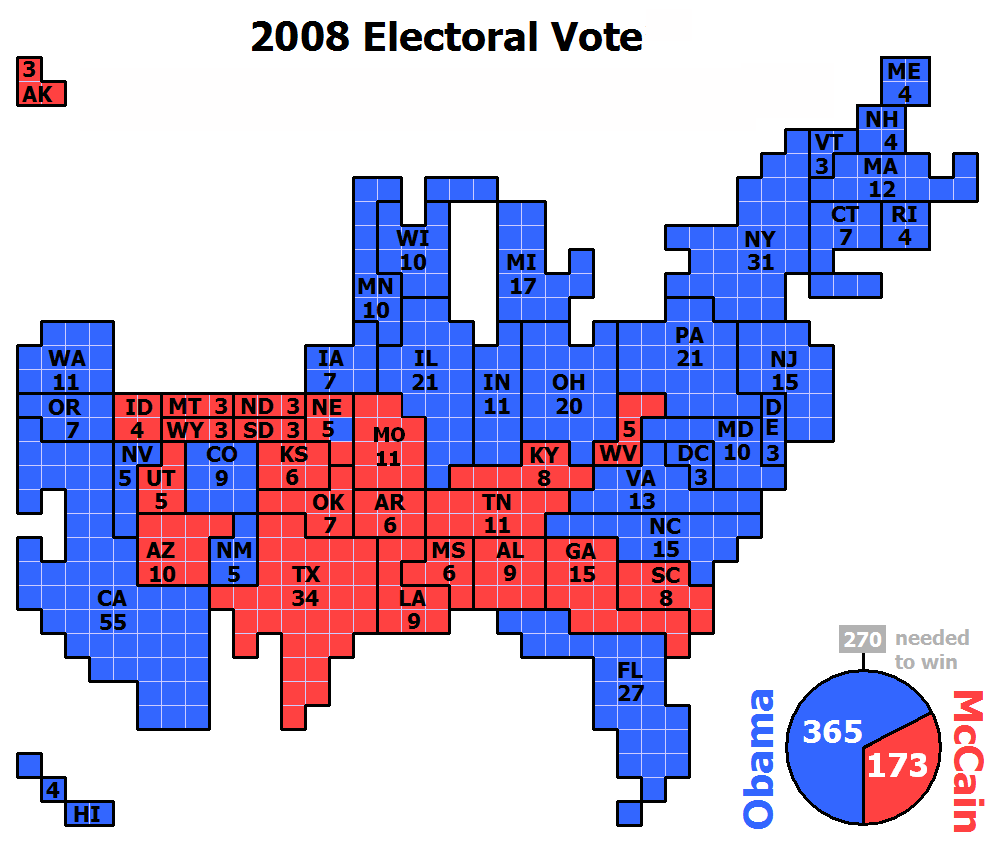
Cartogram of the Electoral Votes for 2008 United States presidential election, each square representing one electoral vote. The map shows the impact of winning swing states. Nebraska, being one of two states that are not winner-take-all, for the first time had its votes split, with its second congressional district voting for Obama.

Following Obama's speech, spontaneous street parties broke out in cities across the United States including Philadelphia, Houston, Las Vegas, Miami, Chicago, Columbus, Detroit, Boston, Los Angeles, Portland, Washington, D.C., San Francisco, Denver, Atlanta, Madison, and New York City and around the world in London; Bonn; Berlin; Obama, Japan; Toronto; Rio de Janeiro; Sydney; and Nairobi.

Later on election night, after Obama was named the winner, he picked up several more wins in swing states in which the polls had shown a close race. These included Florida, Indiana, Virginia, and the western states of Colorado and Nevada. All of these states had been carried by Bush in 2004. North Carolina and the bellwether state of Missouri remained undecided for several days. Eventually Obama was declared the winner in North Carolina and McCain in Missouri, with Obama pulling out a rare win in Nebraska's 2nd congressional district. This put the projected electoral vote count at 365 for Obama and 173 for McCain. Obama's victories in the populous swing states of Florida, Ohio, Pennsylvania, North Carolina, and Virginia contributed to his decisive win. The presidential electors cast their ballots for president and vice president, and Congress tallied these votes on January 8, 2009.

=== Turnout ===
The voter turnout for this election was broadly predicted to be high by American standards, and a record number of votes were cast. The final tally of total votes counted was 131.3 million, compared to 122.3 million in 2004 (which also boasted the highest record since 1968, the last presidential election before the voting age was lowered to 18). Expressed as a percentage of eligible voters, 131.2 million votes could reflect a turnout as high as 63.0% of eligible voters, which would be the highest since 1960. This 63.0% turnout rate is based on an estimated eligible voter population of 208,323,000. Another estimate puts the eligible voter population at 213,313,508, resulting in a turnout rate of 61.6%, which would be the highest turnout rate since 1968.

Broken down by age group, voters under 35 voted for Obama by a large majority with McCain most popular among voters over 60. Voters between 35 and 59 were nearly split 50/50 between the two candidates.

American University's Center for the Study of the American Electorate released a report on November 6, 2008, two days after the election, which concluded that the anticipated increase in turnout had failed to materialize. That report was the basis for some news articles that indicated voter turnout failed to meet expectations. When the remaining votes were counted after the release of the report, the total number of votes cast in the presidential election was raised to 131.2 million, which surpassed the American University report's preliminary estimate of 126.5 to 128.5 million voters by a factor of between 2% and 4%.

The election saw increased participation from African Americans, who made up 13.0% of the electorate, versus 11.1% in 2004. According to exit polls, over 95% of African Americans voted for Obama. This played a critical role in Southern states such as North Carolina. 74% of North Carolina's registered African American voters turned out, as opposed to 69% of North Carolinians in general, with Obama carrying 100% (with rounding) of African-American females and African Americans age 18 to 29, according to exit polling. This was also the case in Virginia, where much higher turnout among African Americans propelled Obama to victory in the former Republican stronghold. Even in southern states in which Obama was unsuccessful, such as Georgia and Mississippi, due to large African American turnout he was much more competitive than John Kerry in 2004.

=== Ballot access ===
Presidential ticket	Party	Ballot access	Votes
Obama / Biden	Democratic	50+DC	69,498,516
McCain / Palin	Republican	50+DC	59,948,323
Nader / Gonzalez	Independent	45+DC	739,034
Barr / Root	Libertarian	45	523,715
Baldwin / Castle	Constitution	37	199,750
McKinney / Clemente	Green	32 + DC	161,797
Others—total		(see below)	242,685

No other candidate had ballot access in enough states to win 270 electoral votes. All six candidates appeared on the ballot for a majority of the voters, while the 17 other listed candidates were available to no more than 30% of the voters.

The following candidates and parties had ballot listing or write-in status in more than one state:

- Alan Keyes (America's Independent Party) received 47,746 votes; listed in three states: Colorado and Florida, plus California (listed as American Independent), and also had write-in status in Kentucky, Ohio, Texas, and Utah.
- Ron Paul received 42,426 votes; listed in Louisiana (Louisiana Taxpayers) and in Montana (Constitution), with write-in status in California.
- Gloria La Riva (Party for Socialism and Liberation) received 6,808 votes nationally; listed in 12 states: Arkansas, Colorado, Florida, Iowa, Louisiana, New Jersey, New York, Rhode Island, Utah, Vermont, Washington, and Wisconsin.
- Brian Moore (Socialist Party, see Brian Moore presidential campaign, 2008) received 6,538 votes; listed in eight states: Colorado, Florida, Iowa, New Jersey, Ohio, and Wisconsin, and Tennessee (independent) and Vermont (Liberty Union). He also filed for write-in status in 17 other states: Alaska, Connecticut, Illinois, Indiana, Kansas, Kentucky, Michigan, Minnesota, Montana, New York, North Carolina, Oregon, Texas, Utah, Virginia, Washington, and Wyoming.
- Róger Calero (Socialist Workers Party) received 5,151 votes; listed in ten states. He was listed by name in Delaware, Minnesota, New Jersey, New York, and Vermont. James Harris was listed as his stand-in in Colorado, Florida, Iowa, Louisiana, and Washington, and also had write-in status in California.
- Charles Jay (Boston Tea Party) received 2,422 votes; listed in Colorado and Florida, and in Tennessee (as independent), with write-in status in Arizona, Montana, and Utah.
- Tom Stevens (Objectivist) received 755 votes; listed in Colorado and Florida.
- Gene Amondson (Prohibition) received 653 votes; listed in Colorado, Florida, and Louisiana.
- Jonathan Allen (Heartquake) received 483 votes; listed only in Colorado, with write-in status in Arizona, Georgia, Montana, Texas, and other states.

The following candidates (parties) were listed on the ballot in only one state:

- Richard Duncan (Independent) – Ohio; 3,905 votes.
- John Joseph Polachek (New Party) Illinois; 1,149 votes.
- Frank McEnulty (New American Independent) – Colorado (listed as unaffiliated); 829 votes.
- Jeffrey Wamboldt (We the People) – Wisconsin; 764 votes.
- Jeff Boss (Vote Here) – New Jersey; 639 votes.
- George Phillies – New Hampshire (also listed with the label Libertarian); 531 votes.
- Ted Weill (Reform) – Mississippi; 481 votes.
- Bradford Lyttle (U.S. Pacifist) – Colorado; 110 votes.

In Nevada, 6,267 votes were cast for "None of These Candidates". In the three states that officially keep track of "blank" votes for president, 103,193 votes were recorded as "blank". More than 100,000 write-in votes were cast and recorded for a scattering of other candidates, including 62 votes for "Santa Claus" (in ten states) and 11 votes for "Mickey Mouse" (in five states).

According to the Federal Election Commission, an unusually high number of "miscellaneous" write-ins were cast for president in 2008, including 112,597 tallied in the 17 states that record votes for non-listed candidates. There were more presidential candidates on the ballot than at any other time in U. S. history, except for the 1992 election, which also had 23 candidates listed in at least one state.

== Results ==
Of the 3,154 counties/districts/independent cities making returns, McCain won the most popular votes in 2,270 (71.97%) while Obama carried 884 (28.03%).

Popular vote totals are from the official Federal Election Commission report. The results of the electoral vote were certified by Congress on January 8, 2009.

Electoral results
Presidential candidate	Party	Home state	Popular vote		Electoral vote	Running mate		
Presidential candidate	Party	Home state	Count	Percentage	Electoral vote	Vice-presidential candidate	Home state	Electoral vote
Barack Obama	Democratic	Illinois	69,498,516	52.93%	365	Joe Biden	Delaware	365
John McCain	Republican	Arizona	59,948,323	45.65%	173	Sarah Palin	Alaska	173
Ralph Nader	Independent	Connecticut	739,034	0.56%	0	Matt Gonzalez	California	0
Bob Barr	Libertarian	Georgia	523,715	0.40%	0	Wayne Allyn Root	Nevada	0
Chuck Baldwin	Constitution	Florida	199,750	0.15%	0	Darrell Castle	Tennessee	0
Cynthia McKinney	Green	Georgia	161,797	0.12%	0	Rosa Clemente	North Carolina	0
Alan Keyes	America's Independent Party	New York	47,746	0.04%	0	Wiley Drake	Colorado	0
Other			194,939	0.15%	—	Other		—
Total			131,313,820	100%	538			538
Needed to win					270			270

Popular vote
Obama	52.92%
McCain	45.66%
Nader	0.56%
Barr	0.40%
Baldwin	0.15%
McKinney	0.12%
Keyes	0.04%
Others	0.15%

Electoral vote
Obama	67.84%
McCain	32.16%

=== Results by state ===
The following table records the official vote tallies for each state for those presidential candidates who were listed on ballots in enough states to have a theoretical chance for a majority in the Electoral College. State popular vote results are from the official Federal Election Commission report. The column labeled "Margin" shows Obama's margin of victory over McCain (the margin is negative for states and districts won by McCain).

Legend
States/districts won by Obama/Biden
States/districts won by McCain/Palin
†	At-large results (for states that split electoral votes)

		Barack Obama Democratic			John McCain Republican			Ralph Nader Independent			Bob Barr Libertarian			Chuck Baldwin Constitution			Cynthia McKinney Green			Others			Margin		Margin Swing (Note: Percentage point difference in margin from the 2004 election)	Total votes	
State/district	EV	#	%	EV	#	%	EV	#	%	EV	#	%	EV	#	%	EV	#	%	EV	#	%	EV	#	%	%	#	
Alabama	9	813,479	38.74%	-	1,266,546	60.32%	9	6,788	0.32%	-	4,991	0.24%	-	4,310	0.21%	-	0	0.00%	-	3,705	0.18%	-	-453,067	-21.58%	4.04%	2,099,819	AL
Alaska	3	123,594	37.89%	-	193,841	59.42%	3	3,783	1.16%	-	1,589	0.49%	-	1,660	0.51%	-	0	0.00%	-	1,730	0.53%	-	-70,247	-21.53%	4.01%	326,197	AK
Arizona	10	1,034,707	45.12%	-	1,230,111	53.64%	10	11,301	0.49%	-	12,555	0.55%	-	1,371	0.06%	-	3,406	0.15%	-	24	0.00%	-	-195,404	-8.52%	1.95%	2,293,475	AZ
Arkansas	6	422,310	38.86%	-	638,017	58.72%	6	12,882	1.19%	-	4,776	0.44%	-	4,023	0.37%	-	3,470	0.32%	-	1,139	0.10%	-	-215,707	-19.86%	−10.09%	1,086,617	AR
California	55	8,274,473	61.01%	55	5,011,781	36.95%	-	108,381	0.80%	-	67,582	0.50%	-	3,145	0.02%	-	38,774	0.29%	-	57,764	0.43%	-	3,262,692	24.06%	14.11%	13,561,900	CA
Colorado	9	1,288,633	53.66%	9	1,073,629	44.71%	-	13,352	0.56%	-	10,898	0.45%	-	6,233	0.26%	-	2,822	0.12%	-	5,895	0.25%	-	215,004	8.95%	13.62%	2,401,462	CO
Connecticut	7	997,772	60.59%	7	629,428	38.22%	-	19,162	1.16%	-	0	0.00%	-	311	0.02%	-	90	0.01%	-	34	0.00%	-	368,344	22.37%	12.00%	1,646,797	CT
Delaware	3	255,459	61.94%	3	152,374	36.95%	-	2,401	0.58%	-	1,109	0.27%	-	626	0.15%	-	385	0.09%	-	58	0.01%	-	103,085	24.99%	17.41%	412,412	DE
District of Columbia	3	245,800	92.46%	3	17,367	6.53%	-	958	0.36%	-	0	0.00%	-	0	0.00%	-	590	0.22%	-	1,138	0.43%	-	228,433	85.92%	6.08%	265,853	DC
Florida	27	4,282,074	51.03%	27	4,045,624	48.22%	-	28,124	0.34%	-	17,218	0.21%	-	7,915	0.09%	-	2,887	0.03%	-	6,902	0.08%	-	236,450	2.81%	7.83%	8,390,744	FL
Georgia	15	1,844,123	46.99%	-	2,048,759	52.20%	15	1,158	0.03%	-	28,731	0.73%	-	1,402	0.04%	-	250	0.01%	-	63	0.00%	-	-204,636	-5.21%	11.39%	3,924,486	GA
Hawaii	4	325,871	71.85%	4	120,566	26.58%	-	3,825	0.84%	-	1,314	0.29%	-	1,013	0.22%	-	979	0.22%	-	0	0.00%	-	205,305	45.27%	36.52%	453,568	HI
Idaho	4	236,440	36.09%	-	403,012	61.52%	4	7,175	1.10%	-	3,658	0.56%	-	4,747	0.72%	-	39	0.01%	-	51	0.01%	-	-166,572	-25.43%	12.69%	655,122	ID
Illinois	21	3,419,348	61.92%	21	2,031,179	36.78%	-	30,948	0.56%	-	19,642	0.36%	-	8,256	0.15%	-	11,838	0.21%	-	1,160	0.02%	-	1,388,169	25.14%	14.80%	5,522,371	IL
Indiana	11	1,374,039	49.95%	11	1,345,648	48.91%	-	909	0.03%	-	29,257	1.06%	-	1,024	0.04%	-	87	0.00%	-	90	0.00%	-	28,391	1.04%	21.71%	2,751,054	IN
Iowa	7	828,940	53.93%	7	682,379	44.39%	-	8,014	0.52%	-	4,590	0.30%	-	4,445	0.29%	-	1,423	0.09%	-	7,332	0.48%	-	146,561	9.54%	10.20%	1,537,123	IA
Kansas	6	514,765	41.65%	-	699,655	56.61%	6	10,527	0.85%	-	6,706	0.54%	-	4,148	0.34%	-	35	0.00%	-	36	0.00%	-	-184,890	-14.96%	10.42%	1,235,872	KS
Kentucky	8	751,985	41.17%	-	1,048,462	57.40%	8	15,378	0.84%	-	5,989	0.33%	-	4,694	0.26%	-	0	0.00%	-	112	0.01%	-	-296,477	-16.23%	3.63%	1,826,620	KY
Louisiana	9	782,989	39.93%	-	1,148,275	58.56%	9	6,997	0.36%	-	0	0.00%	-	2,581	0.13%	-	9,187	0.47%	-	10,732	0.55%	-	-365,286	-18.63%	−4.12%	1,960,761	LA
Maine†	2	421,923	57.71%	2	295,273	40.38%	-	10,636	1.45%	-	251	0.03%	-	177	0.02%	-	2,900	0.40%	-	3	0.00%	-	126,650	17.33%	8.32%	731,163	ME
Maine's 1st	1	232,145	60.51%	1	144,604	37.69%	-	5,263	1.37%	-			-			-	1,362	0.36%	-	252	0.07%	-	87,541	22.82%	10.88%	383,626	ME1
Maine's 2nd	1	189,778	54.61%	1	150,669	43.35%	-	5,373	1.55%	-			-			-	1,538	0.44%	-	179	0.05%	-	39,109	11.26%	5.42%	347,537	ME2
Maryland	10	1,629,467	61.92%	10	959,862	36.47%	-	14,713	0.56%	-	9,842	0.37%	-	3,760	0.14%	-	4,747	0.18%	-	9,205	0.35%	-	669,605	25.45%	12.46%	2,631,596	MD
Massachusetts	12	1,904,097	61.80%	12	1,108,854	35.99%	-	28,841	0.94%	-	13,189	0.43%	-	4,971	0.16%	-	6,550	0.21%	-	14,483	0.47%	-	795,243	25.81%	0.65%	3,080,985	MA
Michigan	17	2,872,579	57.43%	17	2,048,639	40.96%	-	33,085	0.66%	-	23,716	0.47%	-	14,685	0.29%	-	8,892	0.18%	-	170	0.00%	-	823,940	16.47%	13.05%	5,001,766	MI
Minnesota	10	1,573,354	54.06%	10	1,275,409	43.82%	-	30,152	1.04%	-	9,174	0.32%	-	6,787	0.23%	-	5,174	0.18%	-	10,319	0.35%	-	297,945	10.24%	6.76%	2,910,369	MN
Mississippi	6	554,662	43.00%	-	724,597	56.18%	6	4,011	0.31%	-	2,529	0.20%	-	2,551	0.20%	-	1,034	0.08%	-	481	0.04%	-	-169,935	-13.18%	6.52%	1,289,865	MS
Missouri	11	1,441,911	49.29%	-	1,445,814	49.43%	11	17,813	0.61%	-	11,386	0.39%	-	8,201	0.28%	-	80	0.00%	-	0	0.00%	-	-3,903	-0.14%	7.07%	2,925,205	MO
Montana	3	231,667	47.25%	-	242,763	49.51%	3	3,686	0.75%	-	1,355	0.28%	-	143	0.03%	-	23	0.00%	-	10,665	2.18%	-	-11,096	-2.26%	18.24%	490,302	MT
Nebraska†	2	333,319	41.60%	-	452,979	56.53%	2	5,406	0.67%	-	2,740	0.34%	-	2,972	0.37%	-	1,028	0.13%	-	2,837	0.35%	-	-119,660	-14.93%	18.29%	801,281	NE
Nebraska's 1st	1	121,411	44.33%	-	148,179	54.10%	1	1,963	0.72%	-	922	0.34%	-	1,024	0.37%	-	394	0.14%	-			-	-26,768	-9.77%	12.50%	273,893	NE1
Nebraska's 2nd	1	138,809	49.97%	1	135,439	48.75%	-	1,628	0.59%	-	1,014	0.36%	-	599	0.22%	-	320	0.12%	-			-	3,370	1.22%	22.93%	277,809	NE2
Nebraska's 3rd	1	73,099	29.63%	-	169,361	68.64%	1	1,815	0.74%	-	804	0.33%	-	1,349	0.55%	-	314	0.13%	-			-	-96,262	-39.01%	12.17%	246,742	NE3
Nevada	5	533,736	55.15%	5	412,827	42.65%	-	6,150	0.64%	-	4,263	0.44%	-	3,194	0.33%	-	1,411	0.15%	-	6,267	0.65%	-	120,909	12.50%	15.10%	967,848	NV
New Hampshire	4	384,826	54.13%	4	316,534	44.52%	-	3,503	0.49%	-	2,217	0.31%	-	226	0.03%	-	40	0.01%	-	3,624	0.51%	-	68,292	9.61%	8.24%	710,970	NH
New Jersey	15	2,215,422	57.27%	15	1,613,207	41.70%	-	21,298	0.55%	-	8,441	0.22%	-	3,956	0.10%	-	3,636	0.09%	-	2,277	0.06%	-	602,215	15.57%	8.89%	3,868,237	NJ
New Mexico	5	472,422	56.91%	5	346,832	41.78%	-	5,327	0.64%	-	2,428	0.29%	-	1,597	0.19%	-	1,552	0.19%	-	0	0.00%	-	125,590	15.13%	15.79%	830,158	NM
New York	31	4,804,945	62.88%	31	2,752,771	36.03%	-	41,249	0.54%	-	19,596	0.26%	-	634	0.01%	-	12,801	0.17%	-	8,935	0.12%	-	2,052,174	26.85%	8.57%	7,640,931	NY
North Carolina	15	2,142,651	49.70%	15	2,128,474	49.38%	-	1,448	0.03%	-	25,722	0.60%	-	0	0.00%	-	158	0.00%	-	12,336	0.29%	-	14,177	0.32%	12.76%	4,310,789	NC
North Dakota	3	141,278	44.62%	-	168,601	53.25%	3	4,189	1.32%	-	1,354	0.43%	-	1,199	0.38%	-	0	0.00%	-	0	0.00%	-	-27,323	-8.63%	18.73%	316,621	ND
Ohio	20	2,940,044	51.50%	20	2,677,820	46.91%	-	42,337	0.74%	-	19,917	0.35%	-	12,565	0.22%	-	8,518	0.15%	-	7,149	0.13%	-	262,224	4.59%	6.70%	5,708,350	OH
Oklahoma	7	502,496	34.35%	-	960,165	65.65%	7	0	0.00%	-	0	0.00%	-	0	0.00%	-	0	0.00%	-	0	0.00%	-	-457,669	-31.30%	−0.15%	1,462,661	OK
Oregon	7	1,037,291	56.75%	7	738,475	40.40%	-	18,614	1.02%	-	7,635	0.42%	-	7,693	0.42%	-	4,543	0.25%	-	13,613	0.74%	-	298,816	16.35%	12.19%	1,827,864	OR
Pennsylvania	21	3,276,363	54.49%	21	2,655,885	44.17%	-	42,977	0.71%	-	19,912	0.33%	-	1,092	0.02%	-	0	0.00%	-	17,043	0.28%	-	620,478	10.32%	7.82%	6,013,272	PA
Rhode Island	4	296,571	62.86%	4	165,391	35.06%	-	4,829	1.02%	-	1,382	0.29%	-	675	0.14%	-	797	0.17%	-	2,121	0.45%	-	131,180	27.80%	7.06%	471,766	RI
South Carolina	8	862,449	44.90%	-	1,034,896	53.87%	8	5,053	0.26%	-	7,283	0.38%	-	6,827	0.36%	-	4,461	0.23%	-	0	0.00%	-	-172,447	-8.97%	8.10%	1,920,969	SC
South Dakota	3	170,924	44.75%	-	203,054	53.16%	3	4,267	1.12%	-	1,835	0.48%	-	1,895	0.50%	-	0	0.00%	-	0	0.00%	-	-32,130	-8.41%	13.06%	381,975	SD
Tennessee	11	1,087,437	41.83%	-	1,479,178	56.90%	11	11,560	0.44%	-	8,547	0.33%	-	8,191	0.32%	-	2,499	0.10%	-	2,337	0.09%	-	-391,741	-15.07%	−0.80%	2,599,749	TN
Texas	34	3,528,633	43.68%	-	4,479,328	55.45%	34	5,751	0.07%	-	56,116	0.69%	-	5,708	0.07%	-	909	0.01%	-	1,350	0.02%	-	-950,695	-11.77%	11.09%	8,077,795	TX
Utah	5	327,670	34.41%	-	596,030	62.58%	5	8,416	0.88%	-	6,966	0.73%	-	12,012	1.26%	-	982	0.10%	-	294	0.03%	-	-268,360	-28.17%	17.36%	952,370	UT
Vermont	3	219,262	67.46%	3	98,974	30.45%	-	3,339	1.03%	-	1,067	0.33%	-	500	0.15%	-	66	0.02%	-	1,838	0.57%	-	120,288	37.01%	16.87%	325,046	VT
Virginia	13	1,959,532	52.63%	13	1,725,005	46.33%	-	11,483	0.31%	-	11,067	0.30%	-	7,474	0.20%	-	2,344	0.06%	-	6,355	0.17%	-	234,527	6.30%	14.50%	3,723,260	VA
Washington	11	1,750,848	57.65%	11	1,229,216	40.48%	-	29,489	0.97%	-	12,728	0.42%	-	9,432	0.31%	-	3,819	0.13%	-	1,346	0.04%	-	521,632	17.17%	10.00%	3,036,878	WA
West Virginia	5	303,857	42.59%	-	397,466	55.71%	5	7,219	1.01%	-	0	0.00%	-	2,465	0.35%	-	2,355	0.33%	-	89	0.01%	-	-93,609	-13.12%	−0.26%	713,451	WV
Wisconsin	10	1,677,211	56.22%	10	1,262,393	42.31%	-	17,605	0.59%	-	8,858	0.30%	-	5,072	0.17%	-	4,216	0.14%	-	8,062	0.27%	-	414,818	13.91%	13.52%	2,983,417	WI
Wyoming	3	82,868	32.54%	-	164,958	64.78%	3	2,525	0.99%	-	1,594	0.63%	-	1,192	0.47%	-	0	0.00%	-	1,521	0.60%	-	-82,090	-32.24%	7.55%	254,658	WY
U.S. Total	538	69,498,516	52.93%	365	59,948,323	45.65%	173	739,034	0.56%	-	523,715	0.40%	-	199,750	0.15%	-	161,797	0.12%	-	242,685	0.18%	-	9,550,193	7.27%	9.73%	131,313,820	US

Note: Maine and Nebraska each allow for their electoral votes to be split between candidates. In both states, two electoral votes are awarded to the winner of the statewide race and one electoral vote is awarded to the winner of each congressional district.

==== States and EV districts that flipped from Republican to Democratic ====
- Colorado
- Florida
- Indiana
- Iowa
- Nebraska's 2nd congressional district
- Nevada
- New Mexico
- North Carolina
- Ohio
- Virginia

=== Maps ===
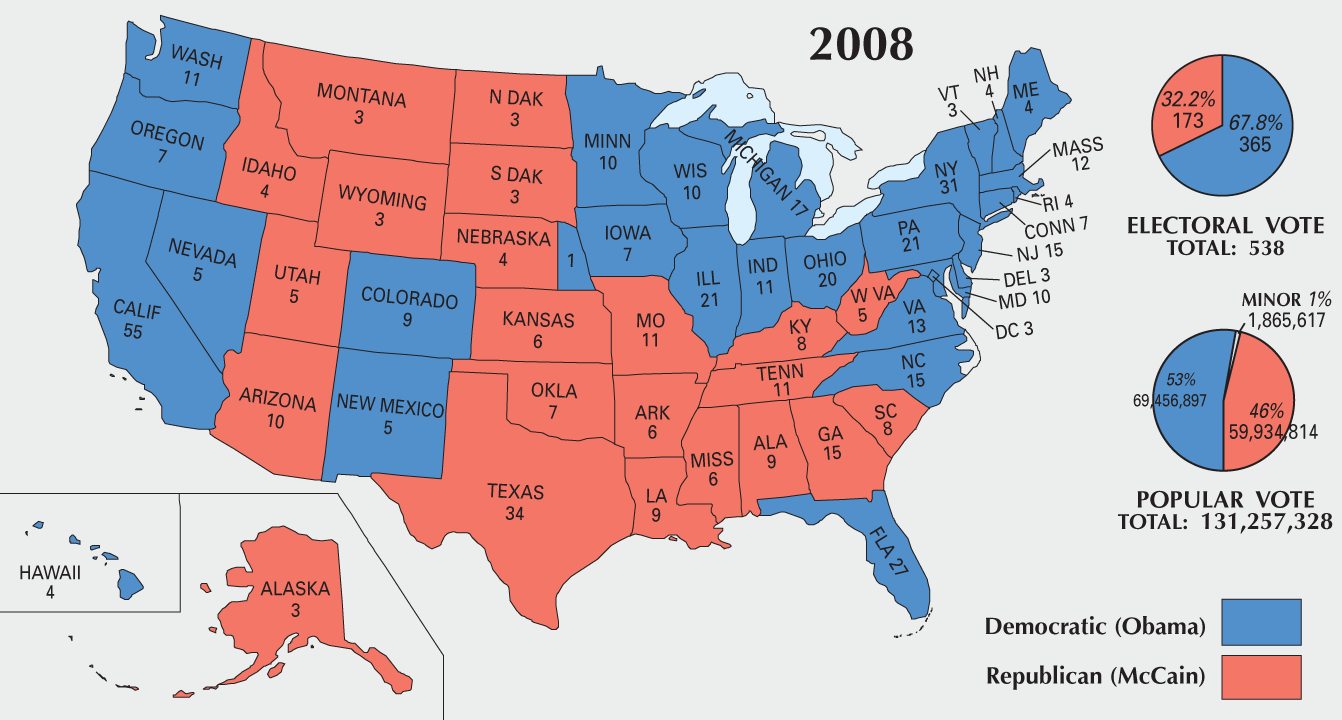
Results by state with pie charts for the electoral college and popular vote. Note that the depicted split in Nebraska's electoral votes denotes the one electoral vote won by Obama in Nebraska's second congressional district and is not representative of the district's actual geographical boundaries.

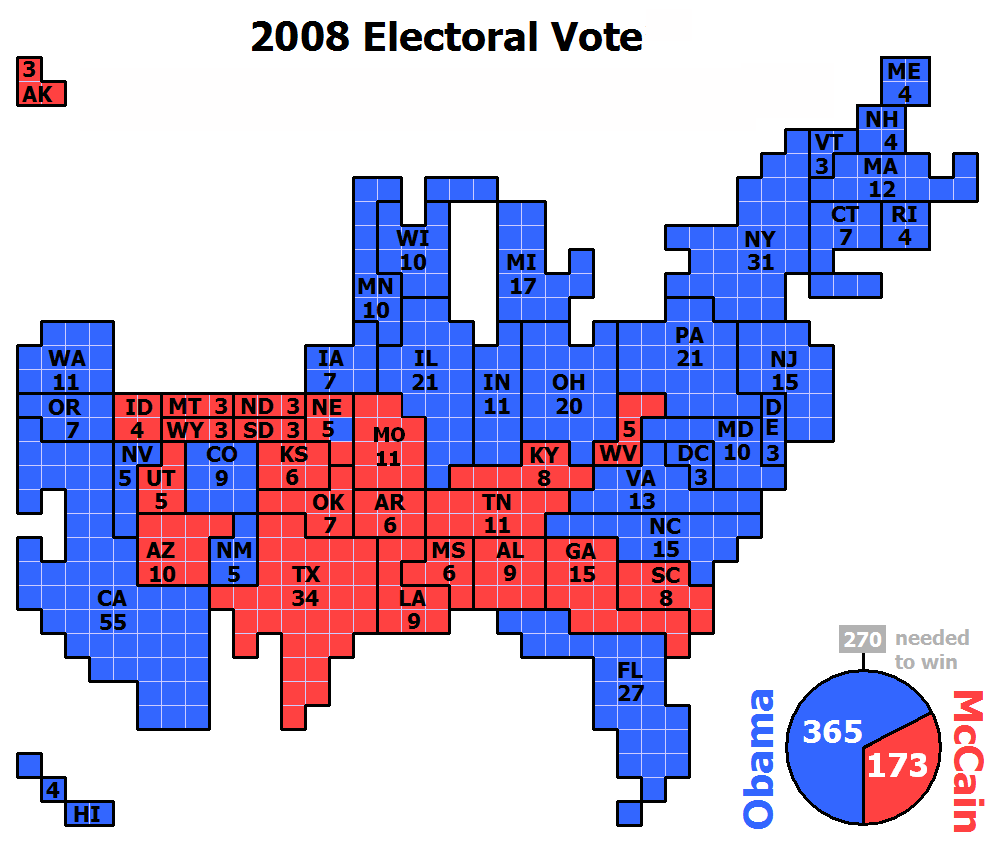
Cartogram of the electoral vote results, with each square representing one electoral vote

Results by county, (Note: Alaska and Louisiana do not have counties. Alaska's boroughs and census areas and Louisiana's parishes are pictured.) shaded according to winning candidate's percentage of the vote.

Results by county flips from 2004 to the 2008 presidential election

Change in vote margins at the county level from the 2004 election to the 2008 election. Obama made dramatic gains in every region of the country except for Arizona (McCain's home state), Alaska (Palin's home state), Appalachia, and the inner South, where McCain improved over Bush.

Margin swing in each state between the 2004 and 2008 presidential elections

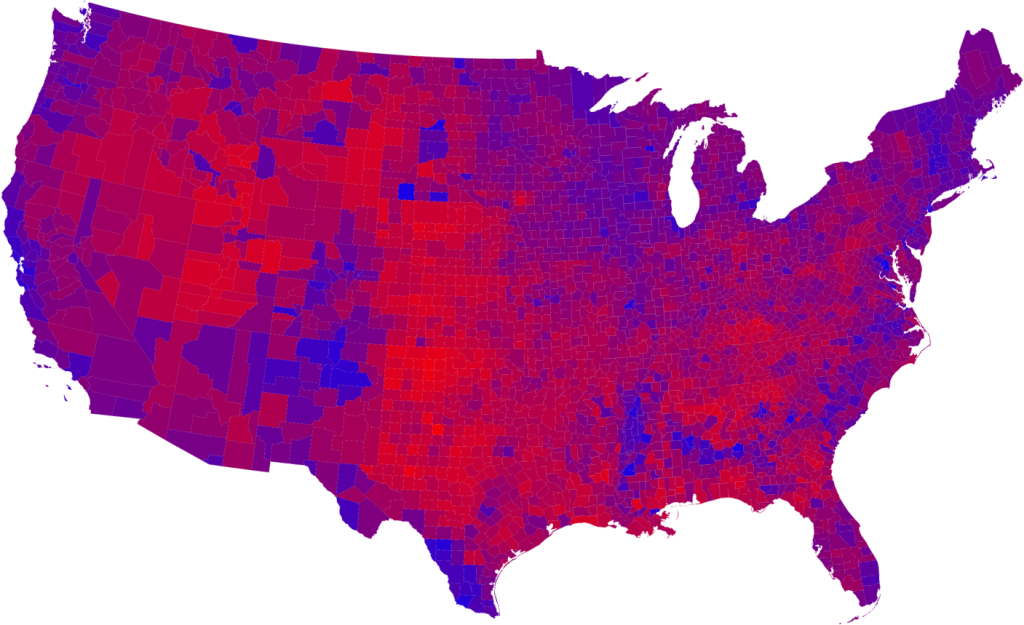
Presidential popular votes by county as a scale from red/Republican to blue/Democratic.

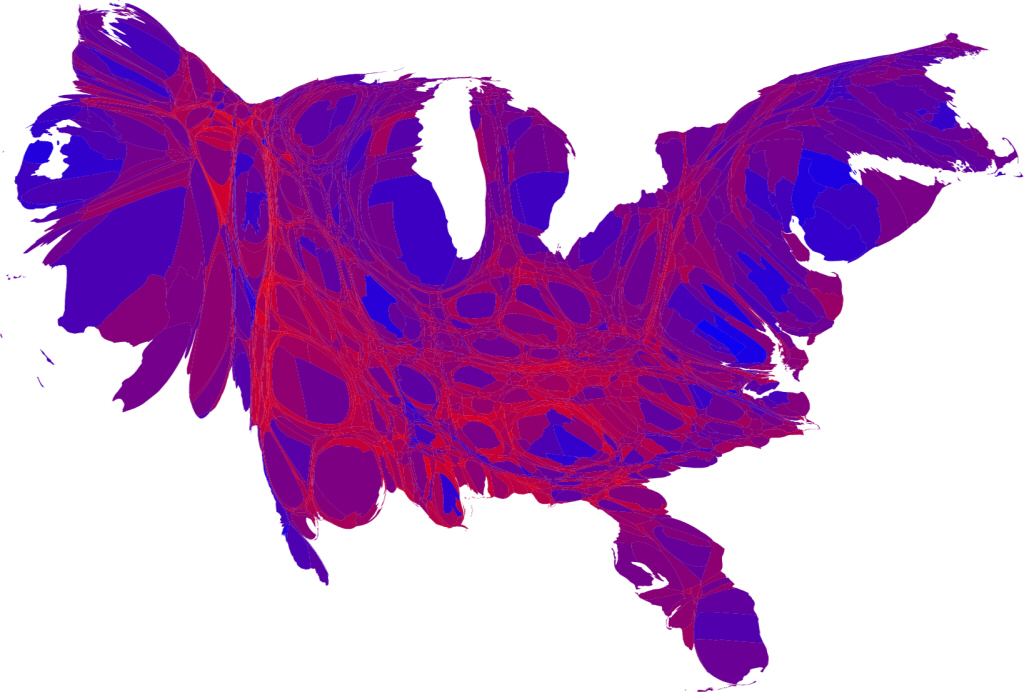
Cartogram of popular vote with each county rescaled in proportion to its population. Deeper blue represents a Democratic majority; brighter red represents a Republican majority.

Results by congressional districts, shaded according to winning candidate's percentage of the vote.

Third place winners

=== Close states ===
States/districts in the 2008 United States presidential election in which the margin of victory was less than 5%. Blue states/districts went for Obama, red for McCain. Yellow states were won by either candidate by 5% or more. Nevada, Colorado, New Mexico, Virginia and Iowa were won by Bush in 2004 but were won by Obama by a margin of more than 5% in 2008.

Red denotes states (or congressional districts that contribute an electoral vote) won by Republican John McCain; blue denotes those won by Democrat Barack Obama.

States where the margin of victory was under 1% (26 electoral votes; 15 won by Obama, 11 by McCain):

1. Missouri, 0.14% (3,903 votes) – 11 electoral votes
2. North Carolina, 0.32% (14,177 votes) – 15 electoral votes

States where the margin of victory was between 1% and 5% (62 electoral votes; 59 won by Obama, 3 by McCain):

1. Indiana, 1.04% (28,391 votes) – 11 electoral votes
2. Nebraska's 2nd congressional district, 1.22% (3,370 votes) – 1 electoral vote
3. Montana, 2.26% (11,096 votes) – 3 electoral votes
4. Florida, 2.81% (236,450 votes) – 27 electoral votes
5. Ohio, 4.59% (262,224 votes) – 20 electoral votes

States/districts where the margin of victory was between 5% and 10% (73 electoral votes; 33 won by Obama, 40 by McCain):

1. Georgia, 5.21% (204,636 votes) – 15 electoral votes
2. Virginia, 6.30% (234,527 votes) – 13 electoral votes
3. South Dakota, 8.41% (32,130 votes) – 3 electoral votes
4. Arizona, 8.52% (195,404 votes) – 10 electoral votes
5. North Dakota, 8.63% (27,323 votes) – 3 electoral votes
6. Colorado, 8.95% (215,004 votes) – 9 electoral votes (tipping-point state for Obama victory)
7. South Carolina, 8.97% (172,447 votes) – 8 electoral votes
8. Iowa, 9.54% (146,561 votes) – 7 electoral votes (tipping-point state for McCain victory)
9. New Hampshire, 9.61% (68,292 votes) – 4 electoral votes
10. Nebraska's 1st congressional district, 9.77% (26,768 votes) – 1 electoral vote

==== Statistics ====
Counties and county-equivalents with highest percentage of Democratic vote:

1. Washington, D.C. 92.46%
2. Prince George's County, Maryland 88.87%
3. Bronx County, New York 88.71%
4. Shannon County, South Dakota 88.69%
5. Petersburg, Virginia 88.64%

Counties with highest percentage of Republican vote:

1. King County, Texas 92.64%
2. Roberts County, Texas 92.08%
3. Ochiltree County, Texas 91.70%
4. Glasscock County, Texas 90.13%
5. Beaver County, Oklahoma 89.25%

== Voter demographics ==
The 2008 presidential vote by demographic subgroup
Demographic subgroup	Obama	McCain	Other	% of total vote
Total vote	53	46	1	100
Ideology
Liberals	89	10	1	22
Moderates	60	39	1	44
Conservatives	20	78	2	34
Party
Democrats	89	10	1	39
Republicans	9	90	1	32
Independents	52	44	4	29
Gender
Men	49	48	3	47
Women	56	43	1	53
Marital status
Married	47	52	1	66
Non-married	65	33	2	34
Race
White	43	55	2	74
Black	95	4	1	13
Asian	62	35	3	2
Other	66	31	3	2
Hispanic	67	31	2	9
Religion
Protestant	45	54	1	54
Catholic	54	45	1	27
Jewish	78	21	1	2
Muslim	89	2	1	1
Other	73	22	5	6
None	75	23	2	12
Religious service attendance
More than weekly	43	55	2	12
Weekly	43	55	2	27
Monthly	53	46	1	15
A few times a year	59	39	2	28
Never	67	30	3	16
White evangelical or born-again Christian?
White evangelical or born-again Christian	24	74	2	26
Everyone else	62	36	2	74
Age
18–24 years old	66	32	2	10
25–29 years old	66	31	3	8
30–39 years old	54	44	2	18
40–49 years old	49	49	2	21
50–64 years old	50	49	1	27
65 and older	45	53	2	16
Age by race
Whites 18–29 years old	54	44	2	11
Whites 30–44 years old	41	57	2	20
Whites 45–64 years old	42	56	2	30
Whites 65 and older	40	58	2	13
Blacks 18–29 years old	95	4	1	3
Blacks 30–44 years old	96	4	n/a	4
Blacks 45–64 years old	96	3	1	4
Blacks 65 and older	94	6	n/a	1
Latinos 18–29 years old	76	19	5	3
Latinos 30–44 years old	63	36	1	3
Latinos 45–64 years old	58	40	2	2
Latinos 65 and older	68	30	2	1
Others	64	33	3	5
First time voter?
First time voter	69	30	1	11
Everyone else	50	48	2	89
Sexual orientation
Gay, lesbian, or bisexual	70	27	3	4
Heterosexual	53	45	2	96
Education
Not a high school graduate	63	35	2	4
High school graduate	52	46	2	20
Some college education	51	47	2	31
College graduate	50	48	2	28
Postgraduate education	58	40	2	17
Education by race/ethnicity
White college graduates	47	51	2	35
White no college degree	40	58	2	39
Non-white college graduates	75	22	3	9
Non-white no college degree	83	16	1	16
Family income
Under $15,000	73	25	2	6
$15,000–30,000	60	37	3	12
$30,000–50,000	55	43	2	19
$50,000–75,000	48	49	3	21
$75,000–100,000	51	48	1	15
$100,000–150,000	48	51	1	14
$150,000–200,000	48	50	1	6
Over $200,000	52	46	2	6
Union households
Union	59	39	2	21
Non-union	51	47	2	79
Military service
Veterans	44	54	2	15
Non-veterans	54	44	2	85
Issue regarded as most important
Economy	53	44	3	63
Iraq	59	39	2	10
Health care	73	26	1	9
Terrorism	13	86	1	9
Energy	50	46	4	7
Region
Northeast	59	40	1	21
Midwest	54	44	2	24
South	45	54	1	32
West	57	40	3	23
Community size
Urban	63	35	2	30
Suburban	50	48	2	49
Rural	45	53	2	21

Source: Exit polls conducted by Edison Research of Somerville, New Jersey, for the National Election Pool, a consortium of ABC News, Associated Press, CBS News, CNN, Fox News, and NBC News.

== Analysis ==
Obama, having a white mother and Kenyan father of the Luo ethnic group, became the first African American as well as the first biracial president. Several black people had previously run for president, including Shirley Chisholm, Jesse Jackson, Lenora Fulani, Carol Moseley Braun, Alan Keyes, and Al Sharpton, though Obama was the first one ever to win the nomination of a major party, let alone the general election. The Obama-Biden ticket was also the first winning ticket in American history in which neither candidate was a white Protestant, as Biden is Roman Catholic and the first Roman Catholic to be elected vice president; all previous tickets with Catholic vice presidential candidates had been defeated (1964, 1972, 1984). The Obama-Biden ticket was the first winning ticket consisting of two sitting senators since 1960 (John F. Kennedy/Lyndon B. Johnson), (Note: In the previous election cycle, Democrats also nominated two sitting senators, John Kerry of Massachusetts and John Edwards of North Carolina, but they lost to incumbents Bush and Cheney.) and Obama became the first Northern Democratic president since Kennedy. Also, Obama became the first Democratic candidate to win a majority of the popular vote since Jimmy Carter in 1976, the first to win a majority of both votes and states since Lyndon B. Johnson in 1964, and the first Northern Democrat to win a majority of both votes and states since Franklin D. Roosevelt in 1944. Additionally, Obama became the first Northern Democrat to win any state in the former Confederacy since Hubert Humphrey won Texas in 1968. Furthermore, his margin of victory, 7.27%, was the largest for any victor since Bill Clinton in 1996 and for any first-term president since George H. W. Bush in 1988. This was the first presidential election since 1952 in which neither of the major-party nominees was the incumbent president or vice-president. This is the only election where both major party nominees were Senators.

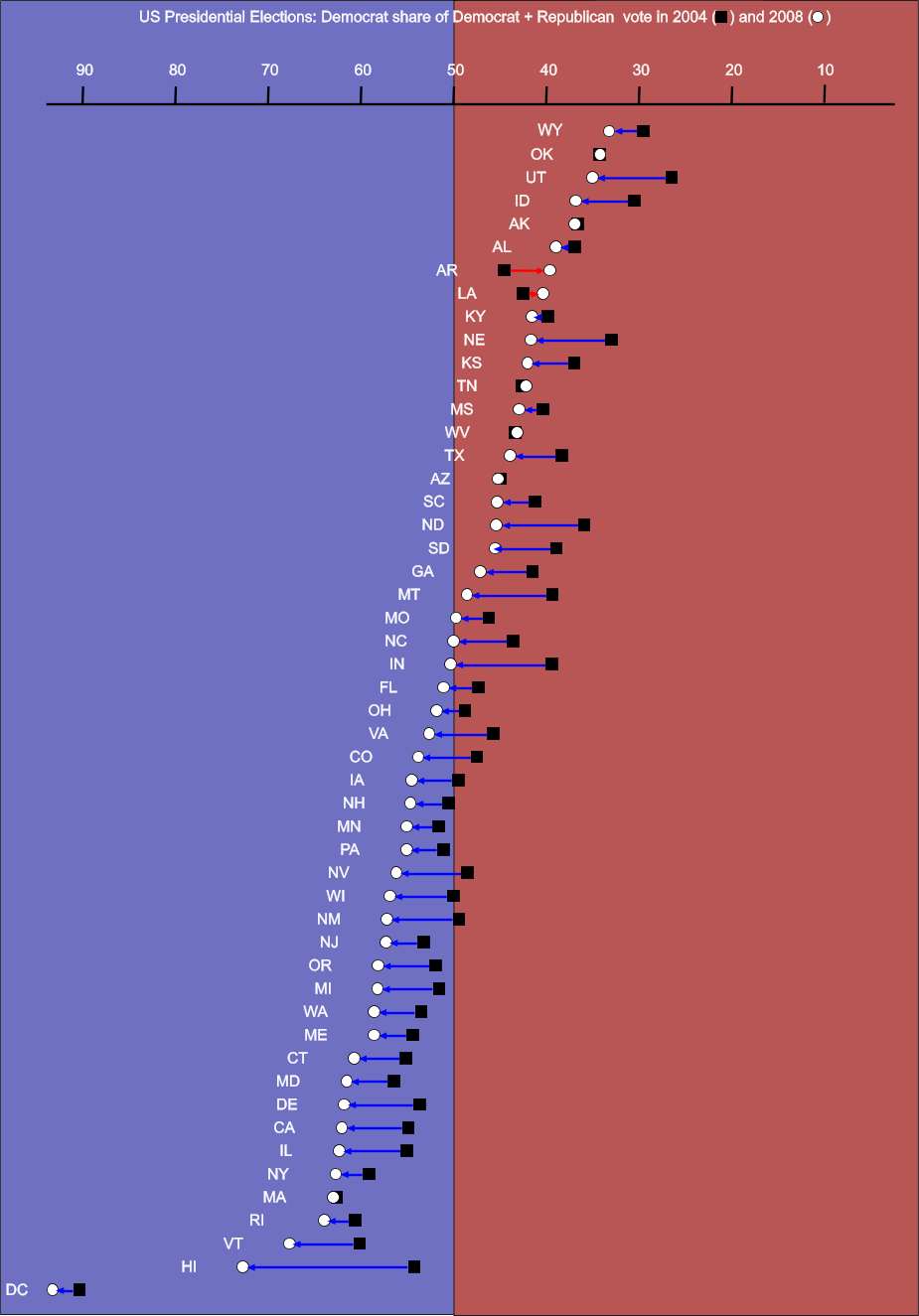
Swing by state. States are listed by (increasing) percentage of Democratic votes, showing how the share of the vote changed between 2004 and 2008. Excluding the candidates' home states, only five states trended more Republican: Arkansas, Louisiana, Oklahoma, Tennessee and West Virginia.

Prior to the election, commentators discussed whether Obama would be able to redraw the electoral map by winning states that had been voting for Republican candidates in recent decades. In many ways, he was successful. He won every region of the country by double digits except the South, which John McCain won by nine percent, although Obama nonetheless carried Delaware, the District of Columbia, Maryland, North Carolina, Florida, and Virginia (the South as defined by the U.S. Census Bureau). McCain won every state in the Deep South, where white voters had generally supported Republican candidates by increasingly large margins in the previous few decades. Obama won all of the 2004 swing states (states that either Kerry or Bush won by less than 5%) by a margin of 8.5 percent or more except for Ohio, which he carried by 4.5 percent. News outlet Reuters described the result as an "electoral landslide".

Obama also defied political bellwethers, becoming the first person to win the presidency while losing Missouri since 1956 and while losing Kentucky and Tennessee since 1960. He was the first Democrat to ever win the presidency without carrying Missouri, to win without carrying Arkansas since that state joined the Union in 1836, and the first to win without West Virginia since 1916 (and, because one West Virginia elector had voted Democratic in 1916, Obama became the first Democrat to win the White House without any of the state's electors since its founding in 1863). This was the first presidential election since 1924 that West Virginia voted Republican while Virginia voted Democratic, which has also occurred in every subsequent election.

Indiana and Virginia voted for the Democratic nominee for the first time since 1964, as did a solitary electoral vote from Nebraska's 2nd congressional district. Indiana would return to being a reliably red state in subsequent elections. Virginia, however, has been won by Democrats in every presidential election since and would grow increasingly Democratic at the state level. North Carolina, which Obama was the first Democrat to carry since 1976, would return to the Republican column in the following elections, though only by narrow margins each time.

Obama was also relatively competitive in some traditionally Republican states he lost, notably Montana, which he lost by under 3%, and Georgia, which he lost by just 5%. He is also the only 21st-century Democrat to lose North Dakota and South Dakota by just single digits. McCain remains the last presidential candidate to receive fewer than 200 electoral votes.

This was the first presidential election in which Nebraska split its electoral votes between two candidates. Together with Maine, which would not split its votes until 2016, Nebraska is one of two states that allow a split in electoral votes without faithless electors: a candidate receives one electoral vote for each congressional district won (Nebraska has three, Maine two), while the statewide winner receives an additional two electoral votes. Obama won the electoral vote from Nebraska's 2nd congressional district, largely comprising the city of Omaha. Nebraska's other four electoral votes went to John McCain. This would not happen again until 2020.

As of 2024, this election is the last time that Indiana or North Carolina voted Democratic, and is also the most recent election where one of the nominees has since died. Until 2024 this was also the most recent election in which any of the major presidential nominees had any military experience.

This election exhibited the continuation of some of the polarization trends evident in the 2000 and 2004 elections. McCain won whites 55–43 percent, while Obama won blacks 95–4 percent, Hispanics 67–31 percent, and Asians 62–35 percent. Voters aged 18–29 voted for Obama by 66–32 percent while elderly voters backed McCain 53–45 percent. The 25-year age gap between McCain and Obama was the widest in U.S. presidential election history among the top two candidates.

== See also ==
- Barack Obama religion conspiracy theories
- Barack Obama citizenship conspiracy theories
- First inauguration of Barack Obama
- Newspaper endorsements in the 2008 United States presidential election
- Presidential transition of Barack Obama
- 2008 United States gubernatorial elections
- 2008 United States House of Representatives elections
- 2008 United States Senate elections
- Third-party and independent candidates for the 2008 United States presidential election

=== Opinion polling ===
- Nationwide opinion polling for the 2008 United States presidential election
- Statewide opinion polling for the 2008 United States presidential election
- International opinion polling for the 2008 United States presidential election
- Scientific forecasts: FiveThirtyEight
