= 2008 United States presidential election in Hawaii =

- November 4, 2008

Nominee	Barack Obama	John McCain
Party	Democratic	Republican
Home state	Illinois	Arizona
Running mate	Joe Biden	Sarah Palin
Electoral vote	4	0
Popular vote	325,871	120,566
Percentage	71.85%	26.58%
County results
Obama
60–70%
70–80%
President before election
George W. Bush
Republican
Elected President
Barack Obama
Democratic

The 2008 United States presidential election in Hawaii took place on November 4, 2008, and was part of the 2008 United States presidential election. Voters chose 4 representatives, or electors to the Electoral College, who voted for president and vice president.

Hawaii, Barack Obama's birth state, gave him 71.9% of the vote with a 45.3% margin of victory in 2008. Prior to the election, all 17 news organizations considered this a state Obama would win, or otherwise considered as a safe blue state. Hawaii has voted Democratic in every presidential election since 1988. Obama's margin of victory in this state is only surpassed by that of the District of Columbia and is the only state that gave either candidate more than 70% of the vote. Turnout in the state was much higher than previous elections.

This remains the second-best performance by any party in a presidential election in Hawaii after Lyndon Johnson's landslide election in 1964.

== Caucuses ==
- Hawaii Democratic caucuses, 2008
- Hawaii Republican caucuses, 2008

== Campaign ==
=== Predictions ===
There were 16 news organizations who made state-by-state predictions of the election. Listed below are their last predictions before election day:

Source	Ranking
D.C. Political Report	Likely D
Cook Political Report	Solid D
The Takeaway	Solid D
Electoral-vote.com	Solid D
Washington Post	Solid D
Politico	Solid D
RealClearPolitics	Solid D
FiveThirtyEight	Solid D
CQ Politics	Solid D
The New York Times	Solid D
CNN	Safe D
NPR	Solid D
MSNBC	Solid D
Fox News	Likely D
Associated Press	Likely D
Rasmussen Reports	Safe D

=== Polling ===
Just 3 pre-election polls were ever taken in the state, averaging Obama at 64% to McCain at 30%.

=== Fundraising ===
Obama raised $3,098,395. McCain raised $424,368.

=== Advertising and visits ===
Obama spent $113,838 while a conservative interest group spent $31. Obama visited the state once.

== Results ==
2008 United States presidential election in Hawaii
Party	Candidate	Running mate	Votes	Percentage	Electoral votes
Democratic	Barack Obama	Joe Biden	325,871	71.85%	4
Republican	John McCain	Sarah Palin	120,566	26.58%	0
Independent	Ralph Nader	Matt Gonzalez	3,825	0.84%	0
Libertarian	Bob Barr	Wayne Allyn Root	1,314	0.29%	0
Constitution	Chuck Baldwin (write-in)	Darrell Castle	1,013	0.22%	0
Green	Cynthia McKinney	Rosa Clemente	979	0.22%	0
Totals			453,568	100.00%	4
Voter turnout (Voting age population)					46.4%

=== By county ===
County	Barack Obama Democratic		John McCain Republican		Various candidates Other parties		Margin		Total votes cast
County	#	%	#	%	#	%	#	%	Total votes cast
Hawaii	50,819	75.94%	14,866	22.22%	1,231	1.84%	35,953	53.72%	66,916
Honolulu	214,239	69.83%	88,164	28.74%	4,410	1.44%	126,075	41.09%	306,813
Kalawao	24	77.42%	6	19.35%	1	3.23%	18	58.07%	31
Kauaʻi	20,416	74.99%	6,245	22.94%	563	2.07%	14,171	52.05%	27,224
Maui	39,727	76.71%	11,154	21.54%	908	1.75%	28,573	55.17%	51,789
Totals	325,871	71.85%	120,566	26.58%	7,131	1.57%	205,305	45.27%	453,568

=== By congressional district ===
Obama won both congressional districts.

District	McCain	Obama	Representative
1st	28.14%	70.43%	Neil Abercrombie
2nd	25.15%	73.14%	Mazie Hirono

== Electors ==
Technically the voters of Hawaii cast their ballots for electors: representatives to the Electoral College. Hawaii is allocated 4 electors because it has 2 congressional districts and 2 senators. All candidates who appear on the ballot or qualify to receive write-in votes must submit a list of 4 electors, who pledge to vote for their candidate and their running mate. Whoever wins the majority of votes in the state is awarded all 4 electoral votes. Their chosen electors then vote for president and vice president. Although electors are pledged to their candidate and running mate, they are not obligated to vote for them. An elector who votes for someone other than their candidate is known as a faithless elector.

The electors of each state and the District of Columbia met on December 15, 2008, to cast their votes for president and vice president. The Electoral College itself never meets as one body. Instead the electors from each state and the District of Columbia met in their respective capitols.

The following were the members of the Electoral College from the state. All 4 were pledged to Barack Obama and Joe Biden:

1. Joy Kobashigawa
2. Marie Dolores
3. Amefil Agbayani
4. Frances K. Kagawa

== Analysis ==
One of the most reliably blue states in the nation, Hawaii has only voted for two Republican candidates since statehood, both in national 49-state Republican landslides—Richard Nixon in 1972 and Ronald Reagan in 1984. A large concentration of Asian Americans makes the state very favorable to the Democrats. Although moderate Republicans occasionally win at the state level—for instance, then-Governor Linda Lingle and Lieutenant Governor Duke Aiona were both Republicans—Hawaii has long been reckoned as a Democratic stronghold.

It came as something of a surprise in 2004 when John Kerry only carried Hawaii by 8.7 points, the worst performance for a Democrat since Reagan carried the state in 1984. However, the state reverted to form in dramatic fashion in 2008, with Barack Obama (who was born in Hawaii) winning the state in a landslide over Republican John McCain. Obama outperformed Kerry by 36.52%, making Hawaii Obama's biggest improvement from 2004. During the same election, Democrats picked up one seat in the Hawaii House of Representatives and two seats in the Hawaii Senate, giving them a supermajority in the Hawaii state legislature with 45 out of 51 seats in the Hawaii House and 23 out of 25 seats in the Hawaii Senate. This is the most recent election that the state voted more Democratic than the previous one.
