= 2008 Ohio Republican presidential primary =

- March 4, 2008
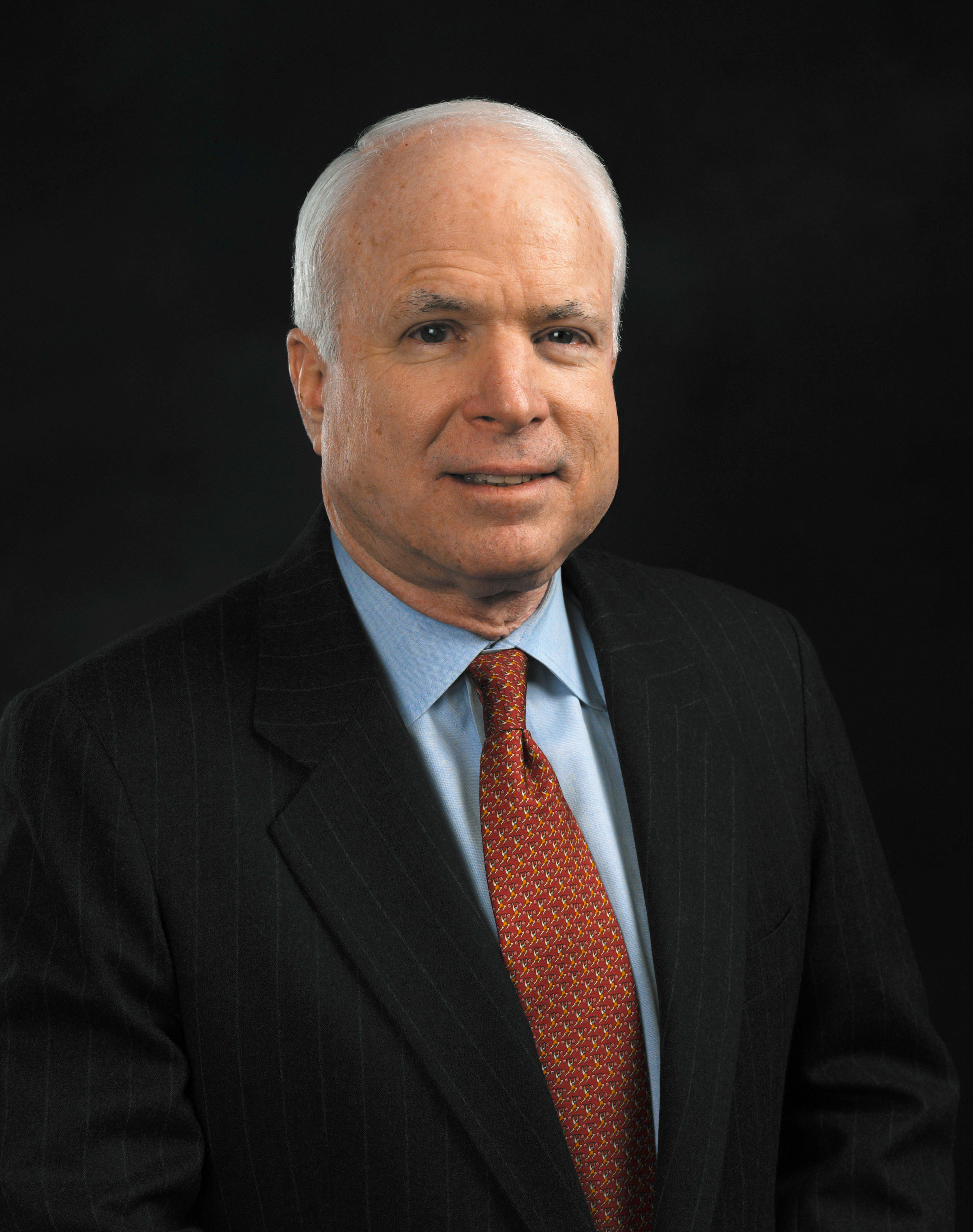

Candidate	John McCain	Mike Huckabee
Home state	Arizona	Arkansas
Delegate count	85	0
Popular vote	656,687	335,356
Percentage	59.92%	30.60%
- Election results by county. John McCain

The 2008 Ohio Republican presidential primary took place on March 4, 2008. That night, candidate John McCain secured enough delegate votes to win the Republican nomination for the 2008 United States presidential election.

== Results ==
McCain won every county in the state.

Official Results
Candidate	Votes (District Level/At Large)	Percentage	Delegates
John McCain	570,453/656,687	54.56/59.92%	85
Mike Huckabee	338,838/335,356	32.41/30.60%	0
Ron Paul	55,690/50,964	5.33/4.65%	0
Mitt Romney*	54,540/36,031	5.22/3.39%	0
Fred Thompson*	26,103/16,879	2.50/1.54%	0
Total	1,045,624/1,095,917	100/100%	85

* Candidate had dropped out of the race before March 4.

3 other unpledged delegates will also be sent to the Republican convention to bring Ohio's total delegate count to 88.

== See also ==
- 2008 Ohio Democratic presidential primary
- 2008 Republican Party presidential primaries
