= 2008 Ohio Democratic presidential primary =

- March 4, 2008

161 delegates to the Democratic National Convention (140 pledged, 21 unpledged) The number of pledged delegates received is determined by the popular vote

Candidate	Hillary Clinton	Barack Obama
Home state	New York	Illinois
Delegate count	74	67
Popular vote	1,259,620	1,055,769
Percentage	53.49%	44.84%
- Primary results by county Clinton: 40–50% 50–60% 60–70% 70–80% 80–90% Obama: 50–60% 60–70%

The 2008 Ohio Democratic presidential primary took place on March 4, 2008 and was open to anyone requesting a Democratic party ballot. In 2008, any registered Ohio voter could on election day request a primary ballot of either the Democratic or Republican party, by signing an affidavit stating that they supported the principles of the party whose ballot they are obtaining.

Ohio sent 141 pledged delegates to the 2008 Democratic National Convention, which were awarded to the candidates proportionally based on the outcome of the election. In addition, Ohio's delegation included 20 unpledged superdelegates not bound by the vote. Hillary Clinton won the primary.

== Delegate breakdown ==
The Ohio Democratic Party sent 161 total delegates to the National Convention. Of those delegates, 141 were pledged and 20 unpledged. The 141 pledged delegates were allocated (pledged) to vote for a particular candidate at the National Convention according to the results of Ohio's Democratic primary on March 4, 2008. The 20 unpledged delegates (popularly called "superdelegates" because each of their votes represented a personal decision rather than the decision of the voters) were free to vote for any candidate at the National Convention and were selected by the Ohio Democratic Party's officials.

The 141 pledged delegates were further divided into 92 district delegates and 49 statewide delegates. The 92 district delegates were divided among Ohio's 18 Congressional Districts and were allocated to the presidential candidates based on the primary results in each District. The 49 statewide delegates were divided into 31 at-large delegates and 18 Party Leaders and Elected Officials (abbreviated PLEO). They were allocated to the presidential candidates based on the primary results statewide.

Of the 20 unpledged delegates, 18 were selected in advance and 2 were selected at the State Executive Committee meeting on May 10, 2008. The delegates selected in advance were 9 Democratic National Committee members, the 7 Democratic U.S. Representatives from Ohio (including 2008 Democratic presidential candidate Dennis Kucinich, who had suspended his campaign before the Ohio primary), U.S. Senator Sherrod Brown, and Governor Ted Strickland. Just before the election, nine of Ohio's 20 superdelegates had endorsed a candidate: five had announced support for Senator Clinton and four had committed to Senator Barack Obama.

== Debate ==
Clinton and Obama appeared in a televised debate at Cleveland State University on February 26. They discussed negative campaigning, health care and free trade. Clinton echoed a theme her campaign had emphasized over the past days, that media coverage of her was much tougher than coverage of Obama, by referring to a Saturday Night Live skit that made a similar point from the weekend before.

== Results ==
Clinton won the election by a comfortable 8.65% margin. Clinton won Ohio by running up margins the Appalachia region in southern Ohio, and the Rust Belt region in Akron, Youngstown, and Toledo. For his part Obama did do well in most of the major cities, winning in the counties that encompass, Cincinnati, Cleveland, and Dayton.

Key:	Withdrew prior to contest

2008 Ohio Democratic presidential primary
Candidate	Votes	Percentage	Delegates
Hillary Clinton	1,259,620	53.49%	74
Barack Obama	1,055,769	44.84%	67
John Edwards	39,332	1.67%	0
Totals	2,233,156	100.00%	141

== Analysis ==
2008 Ohio Democratic presidential primary
Demographic subgroup	Obama	Clinton	% of total vote
White men	44	55	32
White women	34	66	44
Black men	87	13	7
Black women	91	9	11

== See also ==
- 2008 Democratic Party presidential primaries
- 2008 Ohio Republican presidential primary
