= Barack Obama 2008 presidential primary campaign =

American political campaign

Obama for America
- 2008 Obama presidential campaign logo
- Campaign: U.S. Democratic presidential primaries, 2008
- Candidate: Barack Obama; U.S. Senator 2005–2008
- Affiliation: Democratic Party
- Status: Announced February 10, 2007; Presumptive nominee June 3, 2008; Official nominee August 27, 2008
- Headquarters: 233 North Michigan Avenue; Chicago, Illinois 60601
- Key people: Sen. Joe Biden (VP Running Mate); David Plouffe (Manager); Penny Pritzker (Finance); David Axelrod (Media); Robert Gibbs (Communications)
- Receipts: US$287.4 (May 31, 2008)
- Slogan
- Chant: Yes We Can

Website
- www.barackobama.com

On February 10, 2007, Barack Obama, the junior United States senator from Illinois, announced his candidacy for the presidency of the United States in Springfield, Illinois. Obama announced his candidacy at the Old State Capitol building, where Abraham Lincoln had delivered his "House Divided" speech. Obama was the main challenger, along with John Edwards, to front-runner Hillary Clinton for much of 2007. He had only recently emerged as a national figure in Democratic politics, having delivered the DNC keynote address just three years prior and won his Senate election shortly thereafter.

Obama's initial victory in the Iowa caucus in January 2008 helped bring him to national prominence from a crowded field of Democratic challengers. Obama benefited from early support from prominent Democrats including Tom Daschle and Ted Kennedy, and his campaign began to trade a series of hard-fought state wins with Clinton through Super Tuesday, in which Obama had great success in large rural states and Clinton was nearly as dominant in high-population coastal areas. Obama continued to have success in small donor fundraising, and continued winning a greater number of contests than Clinton through April.

In early May, after Obama won the North Carolina primary and narrowly lost the Indiana primary, superdelegates began to endorse Obama in greater numbers. Obama's win in Oregon gave him an absolute majority of the pledged delegates. After a rush of support for Obama from superdelegates on June 3, 2008, the day of the final primary contests of Montana and South Dakota, Obama was estimated to surpass the 2,118 delegates required for the Democratic nomination. On June 7, 2008, Clinton formally ended her candidacy and endorsed Obama, making him the party's presumptive nominee.

On August 27, 2008, at the Democratic National Convention, the Democratic Party formally nominated Obama to run for the office of the President of the United States of America. Obama would go on to win the presidential election against Republican nominee John McCain.

== Pre-announcement ==
A warmly received keynote address by Obama before the 2004 Democratic National Convention sparked expectations that he would run for the presidency. They intensified after both Obama's decisive victory in the race for senator and John Kerry's loss in the concurrent presidential election in November 2004, even though he told reporters then that "I can unequivocally say I will not be running for national office in four years."

In September 2006, Obama was the featured speaker at Iowa Senator Tom Harkin's annual steak fry, a political event traditionally attended by presidential hopefuls in the lead-up to the Iowa caucuses.

In a January 2006 interview with Tim Russert on Meet the Press, Obama denied running for president or vice president in 2008, saying he would serve out his full six-year senate term. However, exactly nine months later in October 2006 on the same program, the senator seemed to entertain the possibility of a 2008 presidential bid. Illinois Senator Richard Durbin and State Comptroller Daniel Hynes were early advocates for such a run.

Many people in the entertainment community expressed readiness to campaign for an Obama presidency, including celebrity television show host Oprah Winfrey, singer Macy Gray, rap artist Common, and film actors George Clooney, Halle Berry, and Will Smith.

In December 2006, Obama spoke at a New Hampshire event celebrating Democratic Party midterm election victories in the first-in-the-nation U.S. presidential primary state, drawing 1500 people.

Speaking at a Democratic National Committee meeting one week before the February announcement, Obama called for putting an end to negative campaigning. "This can't be about who digs up more skeletons on who, who makes the fewest slip-ups on the campaign trail," he said. "We owe it to the American people to do more than that."

== Announcement of candidacy ==
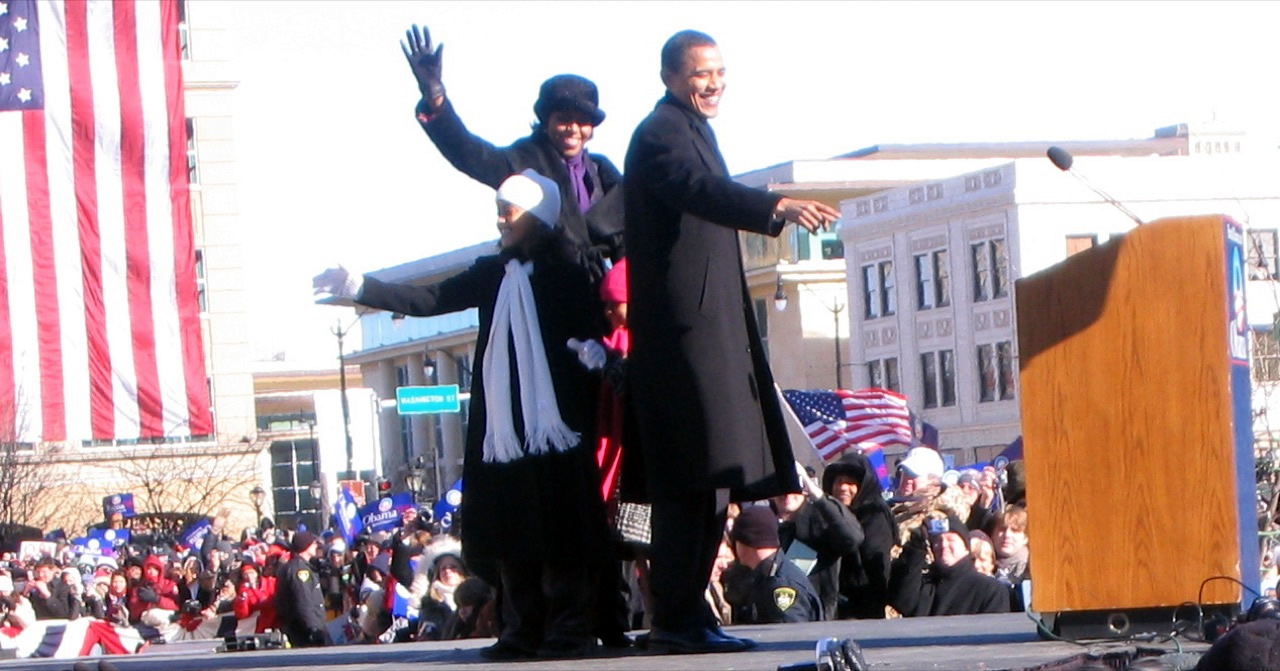
Obama on stage in Springfield, Illinois, with his wife and daughters just before announcing his presidential campaign.

On January 16, 2007, Obama announced via a video on his website that he had formed a presidential exploratory committee, and on February 10 he formally announced his candidacy with these words:

It was here, in Springfield, where North, South, East, and West come together that I was reminded of the essential decency of the American people—where I came to believe that through this decency, we can build a more hopeful America. And that is why, in the shadow of the Old State Capitol, where Lincoln once called on a divided house to stand together, where common hopes and common dreams still live, I stand before you today to announce my candidacy for President of the United States.

== Campaign staff and policy team ==
On January 14, 2007, the Chicago Tribune reported that Obama had begun assembling his 2008 presidential campaign team, to be headquartered in Chicago. His team included campaign manager David Plouffe and media consultant David Axelrod, who were partners at the Chicago-based political consulting firm AKP&D Message and Media. Communications director Robert Gibbs was previously press secretary for John Kerry's 2004 presidential campaign. Penny Pritzker headed the campaign's finance team.

Other members of the campaign staff included Deputy National Campaign Director Steve Hildebrand, New Media Director Joe Rospars, speechwriter Jon Favreau, national press secretary Bill Burton, traveling press secretary Dan Pfeiffer, policy development Cassandra Butts, finance director Julianna Smoot, research director Devorah Adler, and pollsters Paul Harstad and Cornell Belcher.

A number of Obama's top aides have backgrounds with former Senate Majority Leader Tom Daschle, who left the Senate due to re-election defeat at the same time Obama was entering it.

Obama's economic advisors included chief Austan Goolsbee, who has worked with him since his U.S. Senate campaign, Paul Volcker, Warren Buffett, health economist David Cutler and Jeffrey Leibman. His foreign policy advisors included a core of nine people: Greg Craig, Richard Danzig, Scott Gration, Anthony Lake, Denis McDonough, Samantha Power, Ben Rhodes, Susan Rice, and Daniel Shapiro until March 2008 when Samantha Power stepped down. A larger group of 250 advisers is divided into subgroups of about 20 people, each focusing on a specific area or topic. His legal affairs advisors include Martha Minow, Ronald S. Sullivan Jr., Christopher Edley Jr., Eric Holder, and Cassandra Butts.

Among his field staff, Paul Tewes and Mitch Stewart led Obama's winning Iowa caucus campaign, and one or the other of them directed field operations in many other crucial states, including Nevada, Minnesota, Texas, Pennsylvania, Ohio, and Indiana.

Obama's campaign was notable for extensive use of a logo consisting of the letter O, with the center suggesting a sun rising over fields in the colors of the American flag. It was designed by a team at Chicago design firm Sender LLC.

== Pre-primary campaign developments ==
=== First half 2007 ===
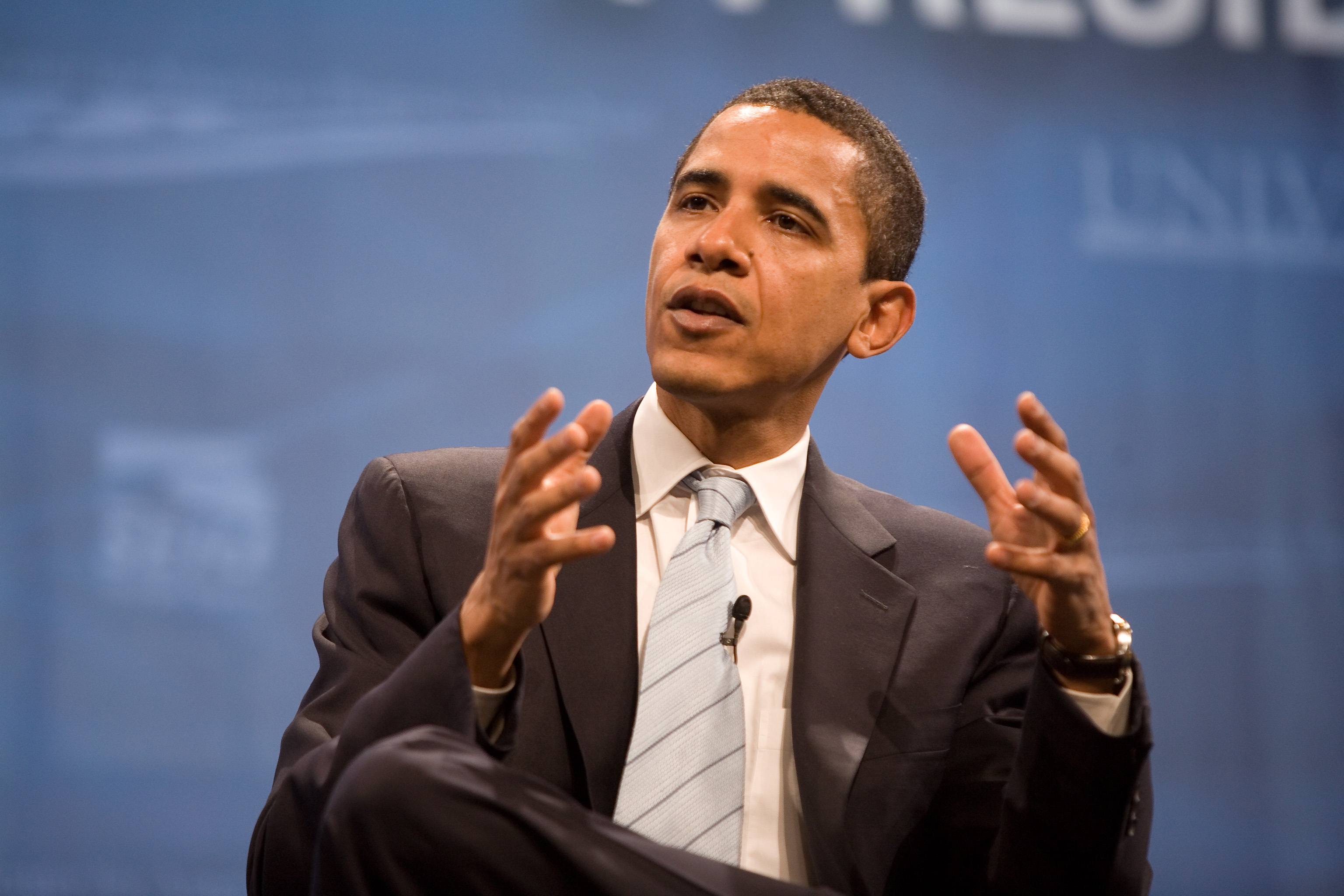
Barack Obama at the University of Nevada, Las Vegas Presidential Health Care Forum, March 2007.

In March 2007, the Obama campaign posted a question on Yahoo! Answers, entitled: "How can we engage more people in the democratic process?" which ultimately drew in over 17,000 responses. The same month, Obama traveled to Selma, Alabama, along with Hillary Clinton, coinciding with the 42nd anniversary of the Selma to Montgomery marches.

Also in March 2007, Hillary 1984, a mashup of Apple's 1984 launch commercial for the Macintosh with footage of Hillary Clinton used in the place of Big Brother, went viral in the early stages of the race for the 2008 Democratic presidential nomination. The video was produced in support of Obama by Phil de Vellis, an employee of Blue State Digital, but was made without the knowledge of either Obama's campaign, or de Vellis' employer: de Vellis stated that he made the video in one afternoon at home using a Mac and some software. Political commentators including Carla Marinucci and Arianna Huffington, as well as de Vellis himself, suggested that the video demonstrated the way technology had created new opportunities for individuals to make an impact on politics.

On May 3, 2007, citing no specific threat but motivated by the large volume of hate mail directed at the candidate, Secretary of Homeland Security Michael Chertoff announced that the United States Secret Service would provide protection for the campaign, including bodyguards for Obama and other services/resources similar to those employed for the safety of the President of the United States, albeit on a proportionally smaller level. Normally, presidential candidates are not offered Secret Service protection until early February of election year; this was the earliest protection had ever been granted.

=== Second half 2007 ===
On August 1 when making his foreign policy speech Obama created controversy by declaring that the United States must be willing to strike al Qaeda targets inside Pakistan, with or without the consent of the Pakistani government. He stated that if elected, "If we have actionable intelligence about high value terrorist targets and President Musharraf won't act, we will." ABC News described the policy speech as "counterintuitive" and commented on how "one of the more liberal candidates in the race, is proposing a geopolitical posture that is more aggressive than that of President Bush" Obama ultimately followed through on this statement of policy four years later when, as President, he ordered the operation to enter Pakistan and kill Osama bin Laden.

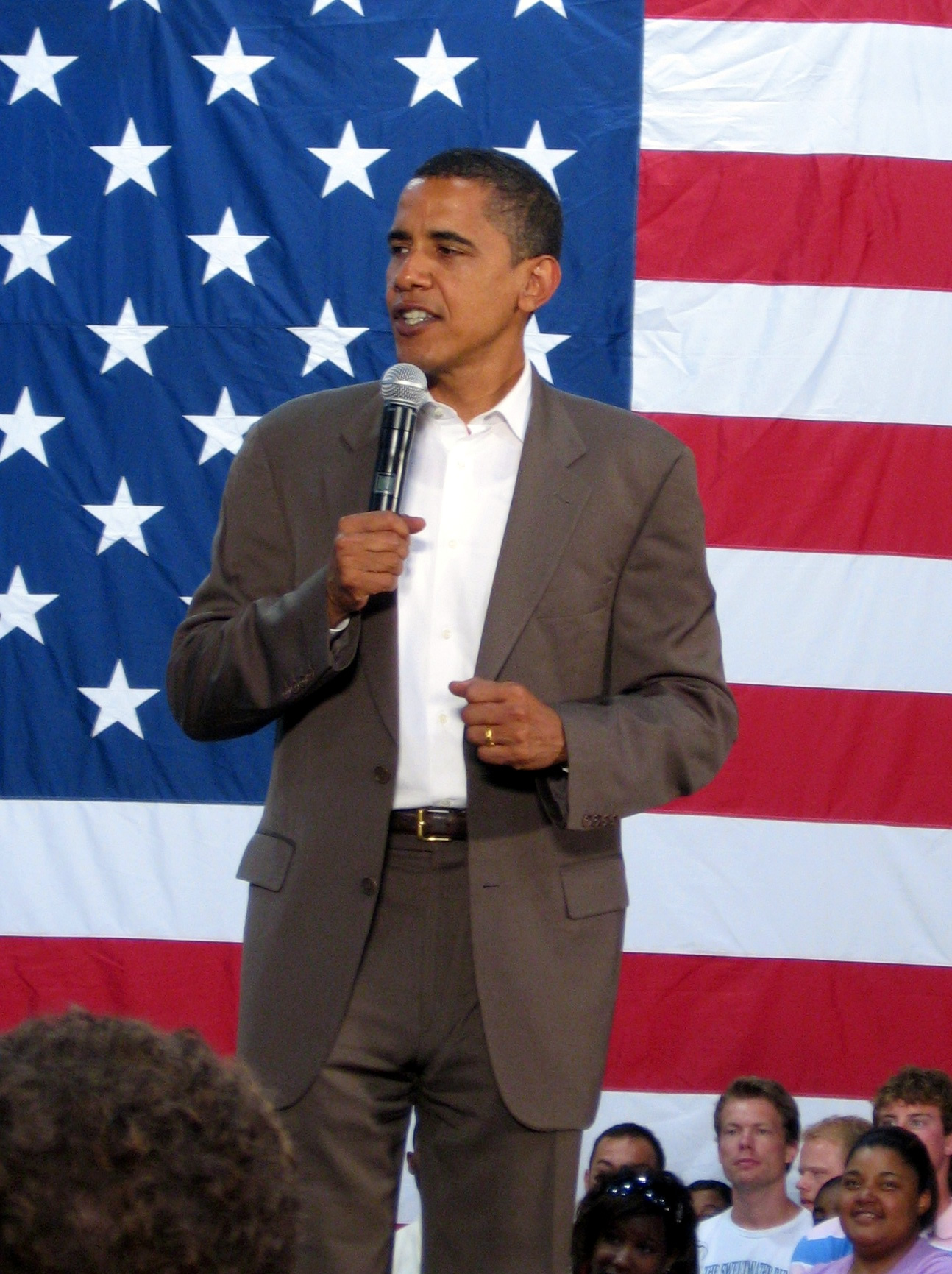
Obama speaking at a rally in Conway, South Carolina on August 3, 2007.

After weeks of discourse surrounding the policy, Obama said there was "misreporting" of his comments, stating that, "I never called for an invasion of Pakistan or Afghanistan." He clarified that rather than a surge in the number of troops in Iraq, there needed to be a "diplomatic surge" and that if there were "actionable intelligence reports" showing al-Qaida leader Osama bin Laden in Pakistan, the U.S. troops as a last resort should enter and try to capture terrorists. That would happen, he added, only if "the Pakistani government was unable or unwilling" to go after the terrorists.

As Democratic debates took place during the summer, Obama received at best mixed notices for his efforts. Democratic strategist Bob Shrum said, "He slips into this tendency, which he probably learned as president of the Harvard Law Review, to overstate his premises before he states his position. In politics, you do the opposite of what you do in the Law Review—you state your position, then say your premises—if you ever get to them." Commentator Eleanor Clift said that, "Obama is almost too cerebral for the sound-bite world of modern politics, but that's part of his appeal."

During a campaign stop in October 2007, a reporter inquired as to why Obama had stopped wearing a lapel pin of the American flag, which he had started wearing after the September 11, 2001 attacks, and his response was that it had come to feel like "a substitute for true patriotism." This led to discussion on the cable news channels and was covered by satirists such as Stephen Colbert, who had an ongoing disagreement with the Fox & Friends assertion that "this is America, and if you want to be president of America, it might be [sic] behoove him to wear an American flag." Commentator Bill Maher, who was highly critical of such questions about Obama's patriotism and called it a "non-story" nonetheless referred to the incident as "[t]he first genuine controversy of the presidential campaign."

In mid-late October 2007, Obama came under fire from the Human Rights Campaign and others for a South Carolina gospel music campaign tour that featured singer Donnie McClurkin, who states that he is ex-gay and that homosexuality is a "curse [that runs against] the intention of God." Obama said in response that, "I strongly believe that African Americans and the LGBT community must stand together in the fight for equal rights. And so I strongly disagree with Reverend McClurkin's views." While not replacing McClurkin, the campaign added a gay minister to the tour.

As fall 2007 continued, Obama fell further behind Clinton in national polls. In late October 2007, two months before the Iowa caucuses and New Hampshire primary, Obama began directly charging his top rival with failing to clearly state her political positions. This shift in approach attracted much media commentary; The New York Times' Adam Nagourney wrote that, "Obama has appeared to struggle from the start of this campaign with how to marry what he has promised to be a new approach to politics—free of the partisan bitterness that has marked presidential campaigns for so long—with what it takes to actually win a presidential race." In an early-anticipated October 30 Democratic debate at Drexel University in Philadelphia, Clinton suffered a poor debate performance under cross-examination from her Democratic rivals and the moderator. Obama's campaign was reinvigorated, and he began to climb again in the polls.

Campaigning in November 2007, Obama told The Washington Post that as the Democratic nominee he would draw more support from independent and Republican voters in the general election than Clinton. At Iowa's Jefferson-Jackson fundraising dinner Obama expanded the theme, saying that his presidency would "bring the country together in a new majority" to seek solutions to long-standing problems.

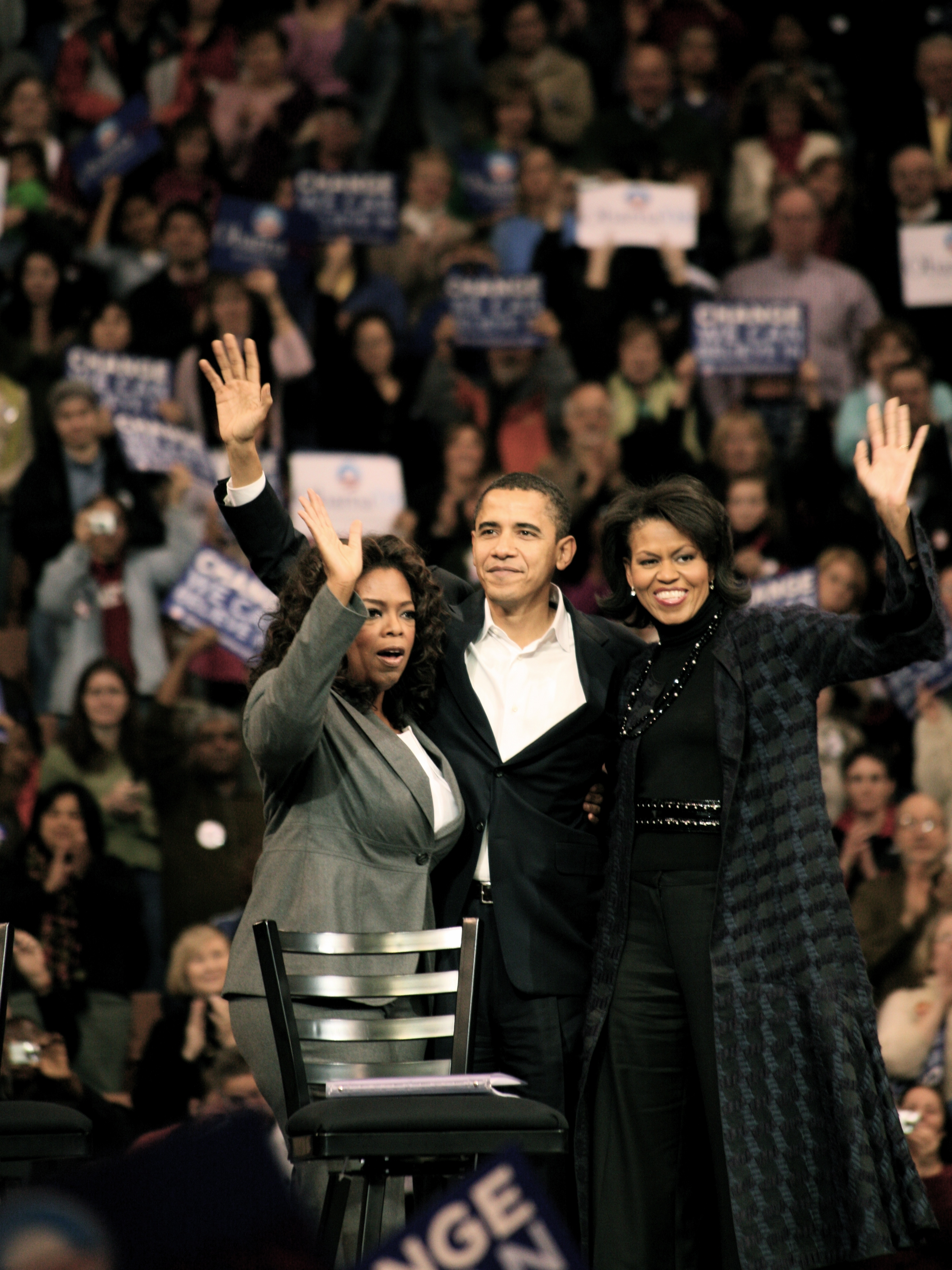
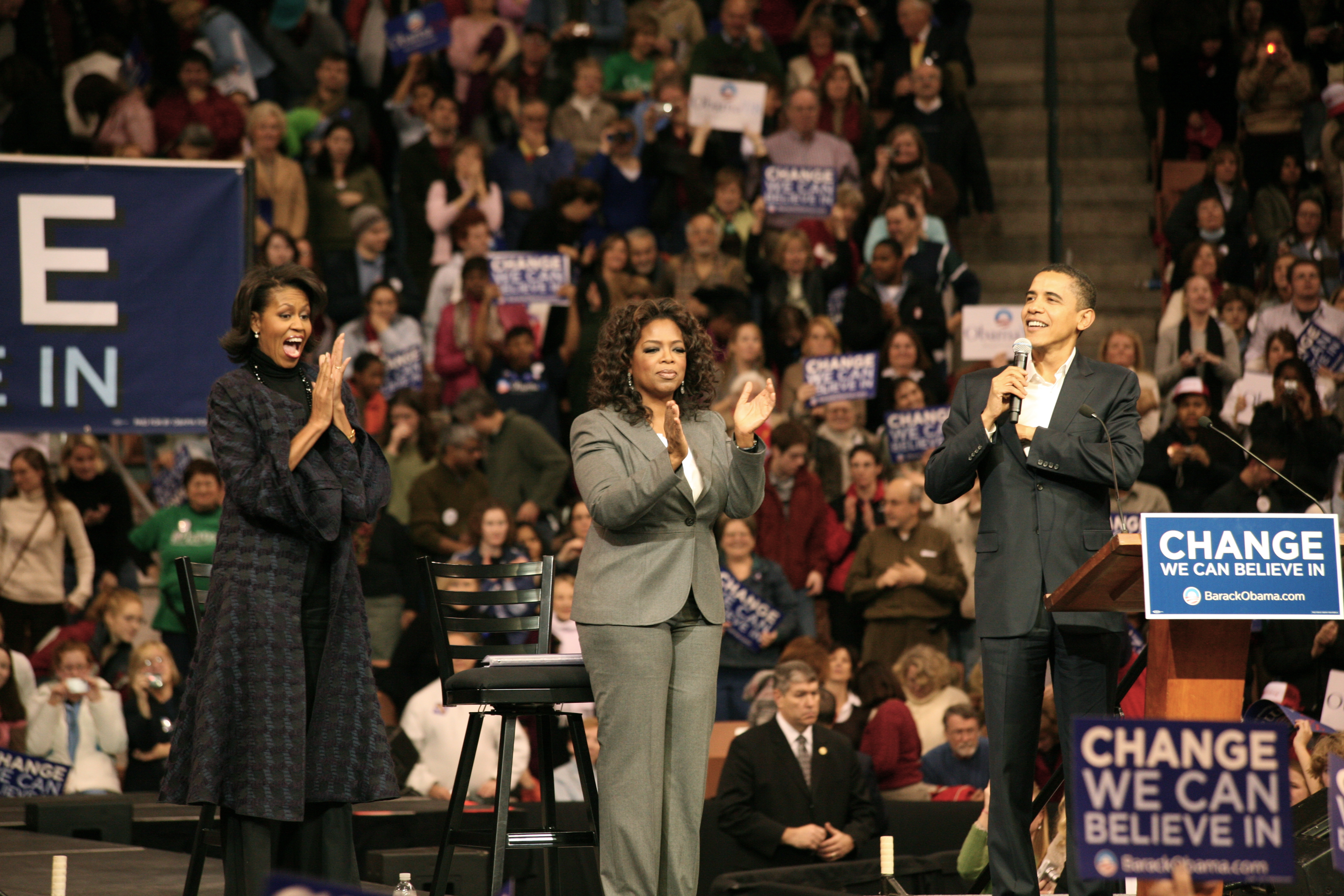
Oprah Winfrey joins Barack and Michelle Obama on the campaign trail (December 10, 2007)

On November 21, Obama announced that Oprah Winfrey would be campaigning for him in the early primary states, setting off speculation that, although celebrity endorsements typically have little effect on voter opinions, Oprah's participation would supply Obama with a large, receptive audience. As word spread that Oprah's first appearance would be in Iowa, polls released in early December revealed Obama taking the lead in that decisive state. Then, on December 8, Oprah kicked off a three-state tour supporting Obama's campaign, where she drew record-setting crowds in Iowa, New Hampshire, and South Carolina and was described as "more cogent, more effective, more convincing" than anyone on the campaign trail. The Oprah-Obama tour dominated political news headlines and cast doubts over Clinton's ability to recover her recently lost lead in Iowa caucus polls.

Later in December, there was controversy regarding Obama's admissions of drug use as a teen. Obama first publicly acknowledged the issue in his 1995 book, Dreams from My Father. In the book, Obama said "Pot had helped, and booze. Maybe a little blow when you could afford it." The issue was revived on the campaign trail after a November 2007 speech at a New Hampshire high school. Obama told the students, "I've made some bad decisions that I've actually written about," noting that his "drinking and experimenting with drugs" accounted for a lot of "wasted time" in high school. Some, including Republican candidate Mitt Romney, criticized Obama for discussing these examples with students. Romney said that "in order to leave the best possible example for our kids, we're probably wisest not to talk about our own indiscretions in great detail." However, fellow GOP candidate Rudy Giuliani and Partnership for a Drug-Free America president Stephen J. Pasierb praised Obama's candor. "I respect his honesty," Giuliani said. Pasierb told CNN that "really the truth works best" when discussing drug use with kids. Bill Shaheen, the co-chairman of Clinton's campaign in New Hampshire, mentioned the drug use in a December 12 conference call with reporters. Shaheen said that if Obama were to win the nomination, Republicans would use Obama's admissions against him in a general election. He suggested that in such a scenario, Republicans would ask, "'When was the last time? Did you ever give drugs to anyone? Did you sell them to anyone?'" He added that such "Republican dirty tricks" would be difficult to overcome. The comments immediately caused controversy, and Shaheen resigned the next day. Clinton denounced the comments and personally apologized to Obama. Her spokesman said that she "made it clear that this kind of negative personal statement has no part in this campaign." Appearing on Hardball with Chris Matthews, Axelrod accused the Clinton campaign of giving a "wink and a nod" to negative tactics. He criticized Clinton's December 3 statement in which she signaled a more aggressive approach and called it the "fun part" of the campaign. Axelrod said that the signal should come "from the top" that the campaigns will not be waged "in the gutter."

When the close proximity of the first contests to the holidays prompted many candidates to release Christmas videos—allowing them to continue presenting their messages, but in more seasonal settings—Obama chose one that gave speaking parts to his wife and daughters and emphasized a message of thanks and unity.

== "Fired up! Ready to go!" ==
"Fired up! Ready to go!" became a rallying cry ubiquitous to Obama's campaign. According to The New York Times, the chant originated during a rainy, early morning campaign stop during the summer in Greenwood, South Carolina. Obama was feeling fatigued among a small group of supporters. When out of the blue, as Obama recounts:

A little woman, about 5'3", 65 years old, in a big church hat, with big glasses, she's smiling right at me. She says, 'Fired up!' I jumped, but everyone acted like this was normal. They all said, 'Fired up!' We hear the same voice saying, 'Ready to go!' And the people, they all say, 'Ready to go!'

This story is frequently recalled during Obama's stump speeches on how "one voice can change a room." The woman in the story, Councilwoman Edith S. Childs, appeared later with Obama at a rally in South Carolina. She later told reporters that if he were to win the presidency, that she would want one thing: "I want an invitation to an inaugural ball!"

== Caucuses and primaries 2008 ==
=== Iowa ===
Obama won the first contest in the Democratic nomination season, the January 3, 2008 Iowa Democratic caucus. Obama had the support of 37.6 percent of Iowa's delegates, compared to 29.7 percent for John Edwards and 29.5 percent for Hillary Clinton. In his remarks to his followers that evening, he said: "On this January night, at this defining moment in history, you have done what the cynics said we couldn't do." He further noted that "our time for change has come" and suggested that in the future Americans will look back on the 2008 Iowa caucuses and say, "this is the moment when it all began."

=== New Hampshire ===
Obama's win in Iowa was seen as a boost to his already-improving chances in New Hampshire. On January 4, he told supporters in New Hampshire, "If you give me the same chance that Iowa gave me last night I truly believe that I will be the president of the United States of America." The campaign received another boost when former New Jersey senator and 2000 Democratic presidential candidate Bill Bradley endorsed Obama on January 6. At the Democratic debate at Saint Anselm College in Goffstown, New Hampshire, on January 5, Obama, Clinton, and Edwards all battled over who best exemplified the buzzword of the campaign, "change". In one key exchange, Clinton said, clearly targeting Obama's rhetorical prowess, "Making change is not about what you believe; it's not about a speech you make. ... We don't need to be raising false hopes." Obama replied that "The truth is, actually, words do inspire. Words do help people get involved."

Polling showed a tight race in the days leading up to the New Hampshire primary. All of the candidates barnstormed in New Hampshire during the four days after the Iowa caucuses, targeting undecided and independent voters in the state. The day before the election, polls conducted by CNN/WMUR, Rasmussen Reports and USA Today/Gallup showed Obama jumping ahead by 9, 10, and 13 points respectively. Despite the apparent surge of momentum, Clinton defeated Obama by a margin of 39.1 percent to 36.5 percent in the New Hampshire primary on January 8, 2008. Obama told supporters that he was "still fired up and ready to go", echoing a theme of his campaign.

In what has been called the "Yes We Can" speech, Obama acknowledged that he faced a fight for the nomination and that "nothing can stand in the way of the power of millions of voices calling for change". The lyrics to the song in Yes We Can, an eponymous music video created by celebrity supporters of Obama, was entirely made up of pieces of this particular speech.

Meanwhile, Internet theories arose about how the vote counting itself had been suspect, due to discrepancies between machine-counted votes (which supported Clinton overall) and hand-counted votes (which supported Obama overall). Fifth-place finisher Dennis Kucinich's campaign paid $25,000 to have a recount done of all Democratic ballots cast in the primary, saying "It is imperative that these questions be addressed in the interest of public confidence in the integrity of the election process and the election machinery." On January 16 the New Hampshire Secretary of State's office began the recount. After recounting 23 percent of the state's democratic primary votes, the Secretary of State announced that no significant difference was found in any candidate's total and that the oft-discussed discrepancy between hand-counted and machine-counted ballots was solely due to demographic factors.

=== Nevada ===
The Nevada Caucus took place on January 19. Obama received the endorsement of two very important unions in the state: the Culinary Workers Union (whose 60,000 members staff the casinos and resorts of Las Vegas and elsewhere) and the Nevada chapter of the SEIU. Clinton countered by appealing to the Hispanic vote in the state, emphasizing that they were at special risk from the fallout from the subprime mortgage crisis.

Before the caucus, comments made by Obama concerning former Republican president Ronald Reagan attracted rebuke from rivals and dissection from all sections of the media. Obama had stated in an interview that: "Ronald Reagan changed the trajectory of America in a way that Richard Nixon did not and in a way that Bill Clinton did not." According to The New York Times, Hillary Clinton "ridiculed the idea that the Republicans were the party of ideas, suggesting Mr. Obama had said that the Republicans had 'better' ideas". MSNBC noted that Senator John Edwards "criticized Obama specifically for referring to Ronald Reagan as an agent of change [stating] in a newspaper interview [that] 'I would never use Ronald Reagan as an example of change.'"

One day after the Culinary Workers Union endorsed Obama, the Nevada State Education Association—a teachers' union that while not officially endorsing Clinton, had top officials who did—filed a lawsuit seeking to eliminate at-large caucus sites that had been set up in nine Las Vegas resorts, saying they violated equal protection and one-person-one-vote requirements. The suit was viewed as a proxy legal battle between Clinton and Obama, as the caucus sites within the casinos would be primarily used by members of the CWU, who are more likely to vote for Obama. This led Obama to allege that the suit was filed in order to hurt his chances at the caucuses. "Some of the people who set up the rules apparently didn't think we'd be as competitive as we were and trying to change them last minute", he said.

On January 17, a federal judge ruled that the casino at-large caucus plan could go ahead. This was seen as a win for Obama because of the Culinary Workers Union endorsement. To further complicate matters, the major news and polling organizations decided to refrain from polling before the Nevada caucuses, fearing the newness of the caucus, the transient nature of Nevada's population, and more fallout from their bad experience in New Hampshire.

Clinton finished first in the state delegate count on January 19, winning 51 percent of delegates to the state convention. However, Obama was projected to win the Nevada national delegate count with 13 delegates to Clinton's 12, because the apportionment of some delegates is determined by Congressional District. Delegates to the national convention were determined officially at the April 19 state convention. At the convention, one of Clinton's pledged delegates defected to Obama, giving Obama 14 delegates to Clinton's 11.

On January 23, the Obama campaign filed an official letter of complaint with the Nevada Democratic Party, charging the Clinton campaign with many violations of party rules during the caucuses, based upon 1,600 complaints they had received. The Clinton camp said the Obama operation was "grasping at straws" and that they had their own complaints about Obama campaign actions during the caucuses.

=== South Carolina ===
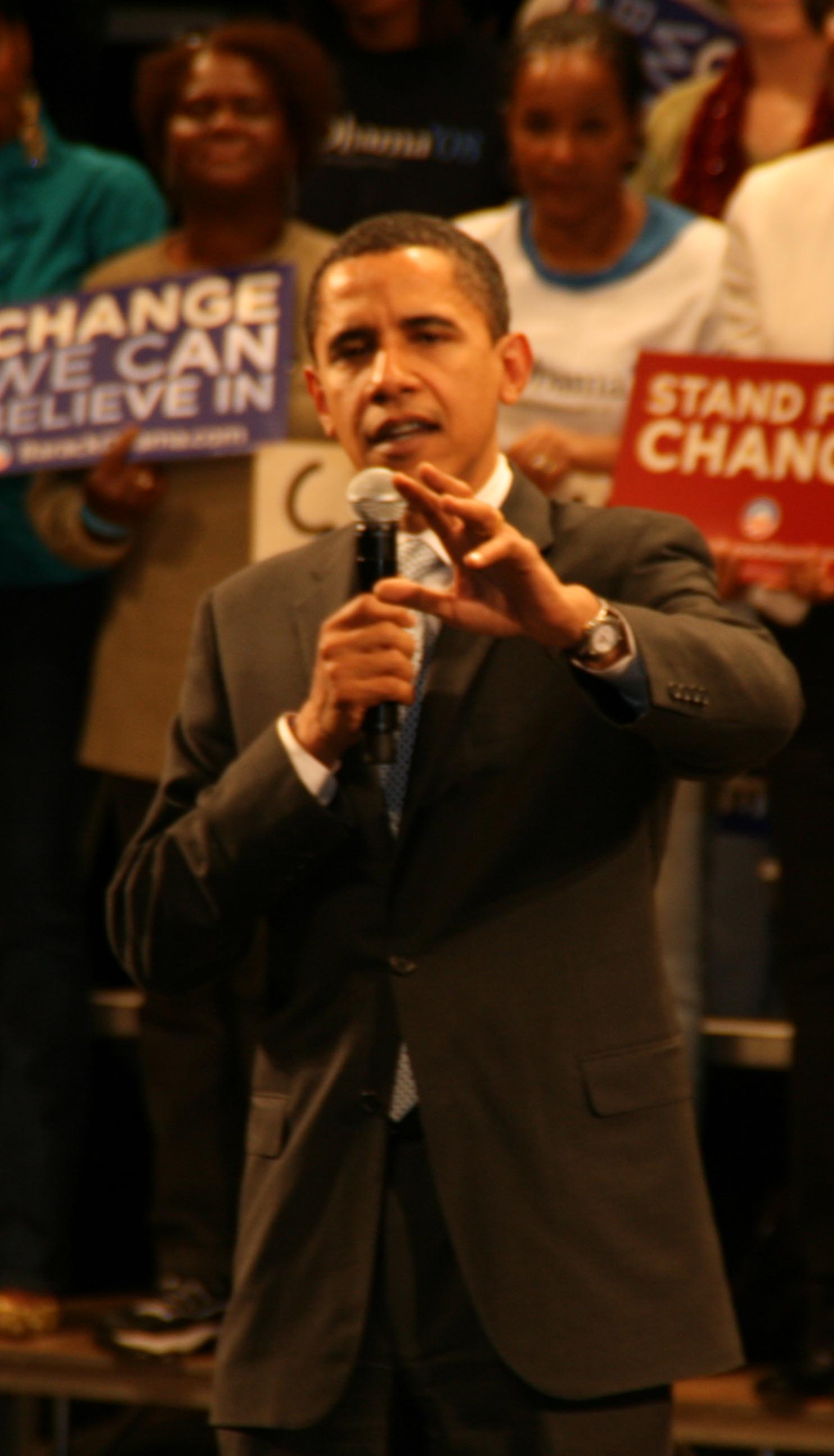
Obama addressing supporters the night before the South Carolina primary at the University of South Carolina

Rasmussen Reports released a poll January 7 showing that Obama led by 12 points, at 42 percent to Hillary Clinton's 30 percent. This was a substantial jump from December, when the two were tied at 33 percent, and from November when Clinton led Obama by 10 points.

Issues of race came to the forefront as campaigning began for the South Carolina primary, the first to feature a large African American portion in the Democratic electorate. First, Bill Clinton referred to Obama's claim that he has been a staunch opponent of the Iraq War from the beginning as a "fairy tale", which some thought was a characterization of Obama's entire campaign. The former President called in to Al Sharpton's radio show to personally clarify that he respected and believed in Obama's viability.

Around the same time, Hillary Clinton said regarding Martin Luther King Jr. in an interview with Fox News, "I would point to the fact that that Dr. King's dream began to be realized when President Johnson passed the Civil Rights Act of 1964, when he was able to get through Congress something that President Kennedy was hopeful to do, the President before had not even tried, but it took a president to get it done. That dream became a reality, the power of that dream became real in people's lives because we had a president who said we are going to do it, and actually got it accomplished." Some African-American leaders took this statement as a denigration of the accomplishments of King and the larger Civil Rights Movement. Hillary Clinton proceeded to blame Obama for the controversy, claiming his campaign had fanned the flames, a charge which Obama dismissed as "ludicrous". By shortly before, and during, a January 15 Democratic debate in Nevada, Clinton and Obama declared a truce on the matter, with both making reconciliatory statements about race, gender, and each other. However, Clinton's support among African Americans was thought to be damaged, with SUNY Albany's Debra Dickerson stating "The Clintons have to do something dramatic and symbolic to win back the trust of many African-Americans."

In part, the tension resulted from the historical coincidence of the first viable African American presidential candidate and the first viable woman candidate, running against each other in the same nomination race. One South Carolina pastor lamented that he had been waiting all his life for either "first" to happen and said, "I really hate that they had to run at the same time in the same election. It just makes what should be a wonderful situation very stressful for folk like me. I never imagined you could have too much of a good thing." After the Clinton-Obama tension on this matter, one Democrat said, "After Iowa, Obama was the post-racial candidate who appealed to all of our better natures. Now he's a black politician, and she's a woman. And it is back to politics as usual."

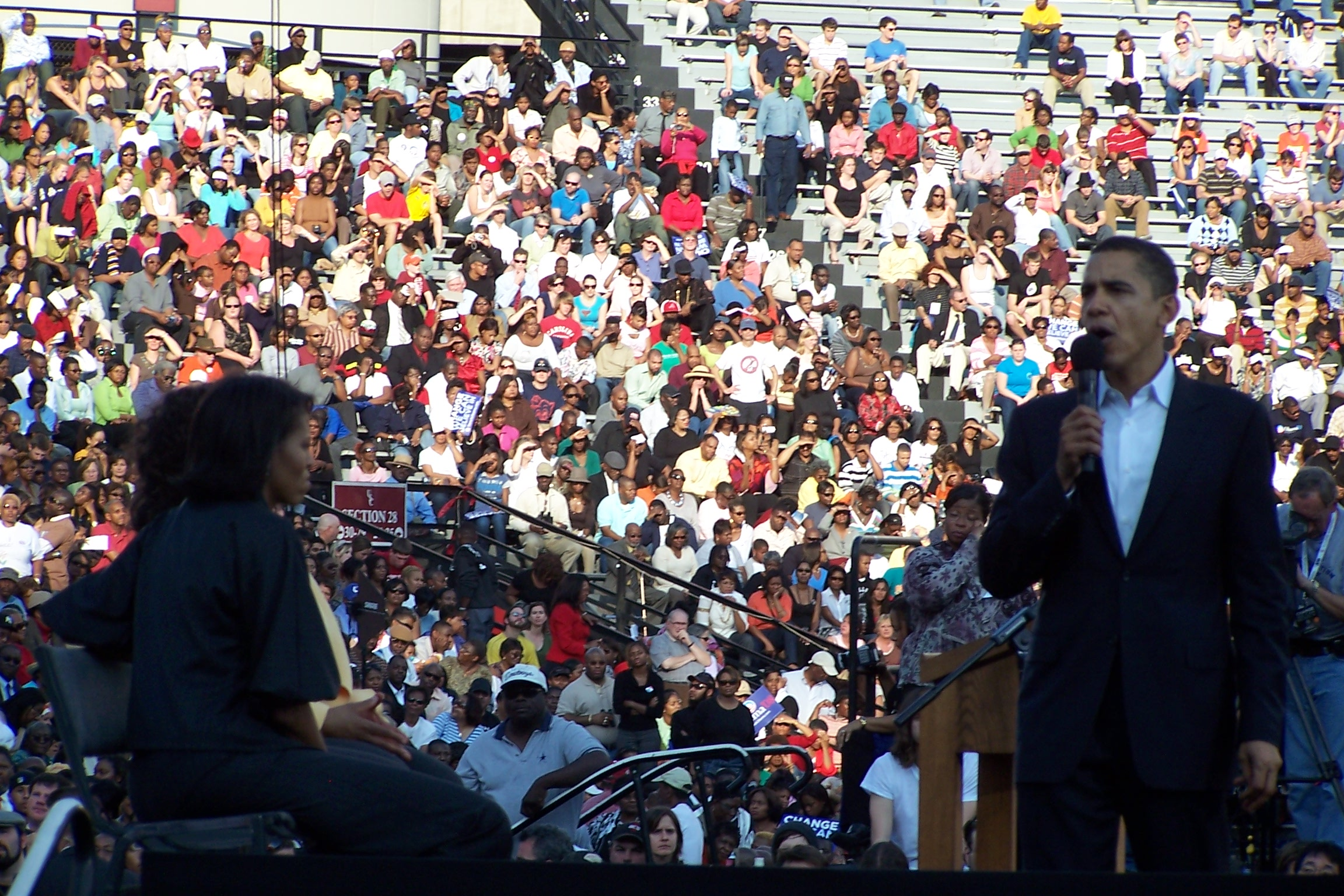
Barack Obama at Williams-Brice Stadium in Columbia, SC, December 9, 2007

The January 21 CNN/Congressional Black Caucus debate in Myrtle Beach was the most heated face-to-face meeting yet between the candidates, reflecting apparent personal animosity. Clinton criticized Obama for voting "present" on many occasions while in the Illinois legislature. "It's hard to have a straight up debate with you because you never take responsibility for any vote," she said. Obama explained that Illinois had a different system than Congress and that 'present' votes had a different function and use in the Illinois Senate. Obama said that he was working to help unemployed workers in Chicago while Clinton was "a corporate lawyer sitting on the board at Wal-Mart." He also took issue with statements made on the campaign trail by Bill Clinton, saying "I can't tell who I'm running against sometimes." The confrontation was the most-watched primary season debate in cable television news history.

On January 26, Obama won the South Carolina primary by a more than two-to-one margin over Clinton, gaining 55 percent of the vote to her 27 percent and Edwards' 18 percent. In his victory speech that night, he said, "Tonight, the cynics who believed that what began in the snows of Iowa was just an illusion were told a different story by the good people of South Carolina." Addressing the racial dust-up and the other campaign back-and-forths between himself and the Clintons, he said, "The choice in this election is not between regions or religions or genders. It's not about rich versus poor; young versus old; and it is not about black versus white. It's about the past versus the future."

=== Florida and Michigan ===
The Florida and Michigan primaries were held on January 29 and 15, respectively. However, the states were previously stripped of all their delegates to the national convention for breaking party rules by moving their primaries to before February 5. All candidates abided by an agreement not to campaign in Florida, and all major candidates except for Hillary Clinton had removed their names from the Michigan ballot. Nonetheless, Clinton celebrated the 'wins' and asserted that they gave her momentum heading to Super Tuesday. The Obama campaign said that Clinton was "basically trying to take a victory lap when there was no race."

On May 31, 2008, the Democratic National Committee Rules and Bylaws Commission met to resolve questions surrounding the contentious Florida and Michigan primaries. In the case of Florida, it was decided that the delegate distribution would be based on the primary results as they stood, and the delegation would be seated in full, but with each delegate receiving half a vote. In the case of Michigan, the delegate distribution was based on an estimate that took into consideration factors such as the actual primary results, exiting polling, and surveys of voter preference among those who did not participate in the Michigan primary. The end result rewarded Clinton with 69 delegates and Obama 59. As with Florida, each delegate would be given a half vote.

=== Super Tuesday ===
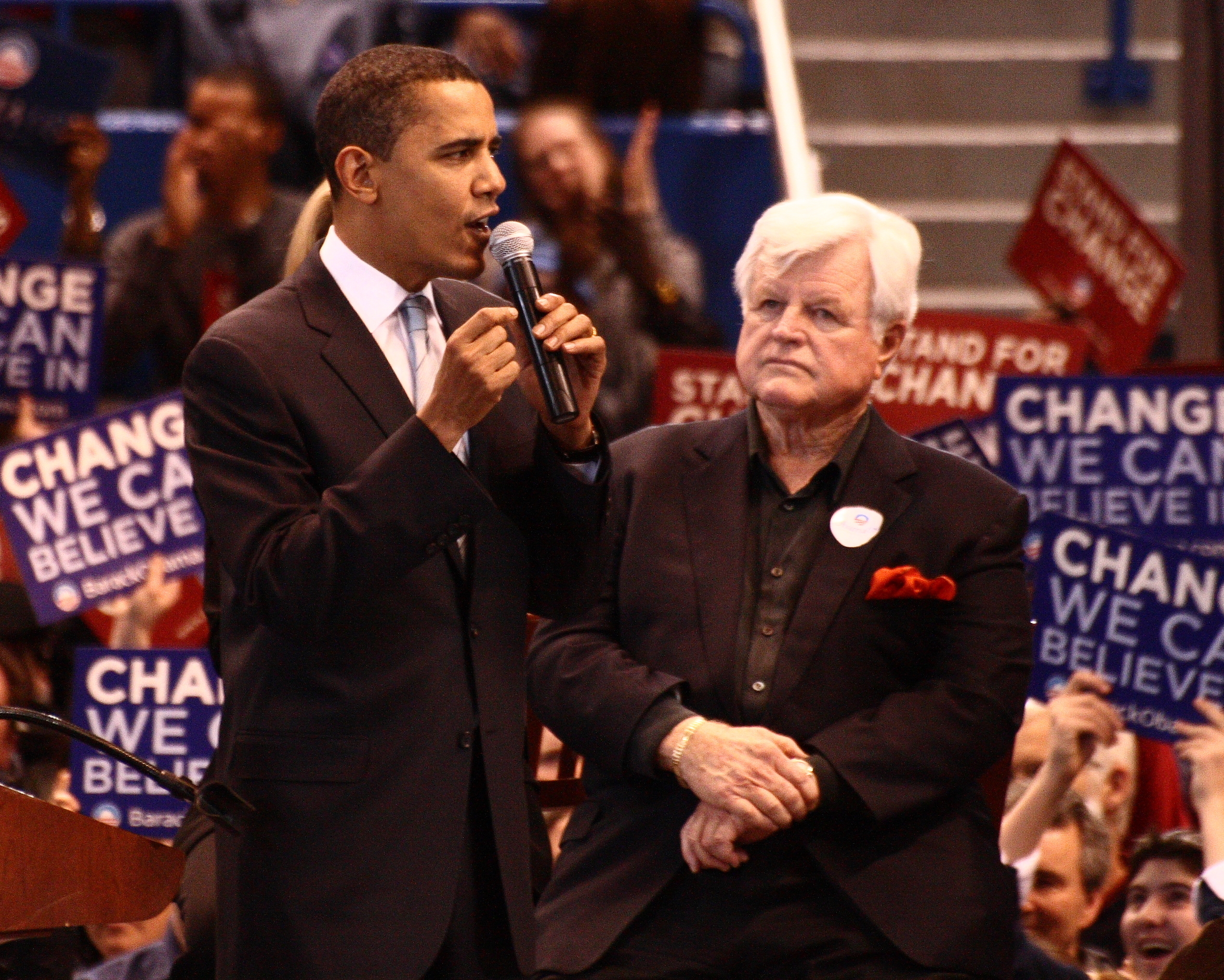
Obama with Ted Kennedy at a rally in Hartford, Connecticut, the day before Super Tuesday

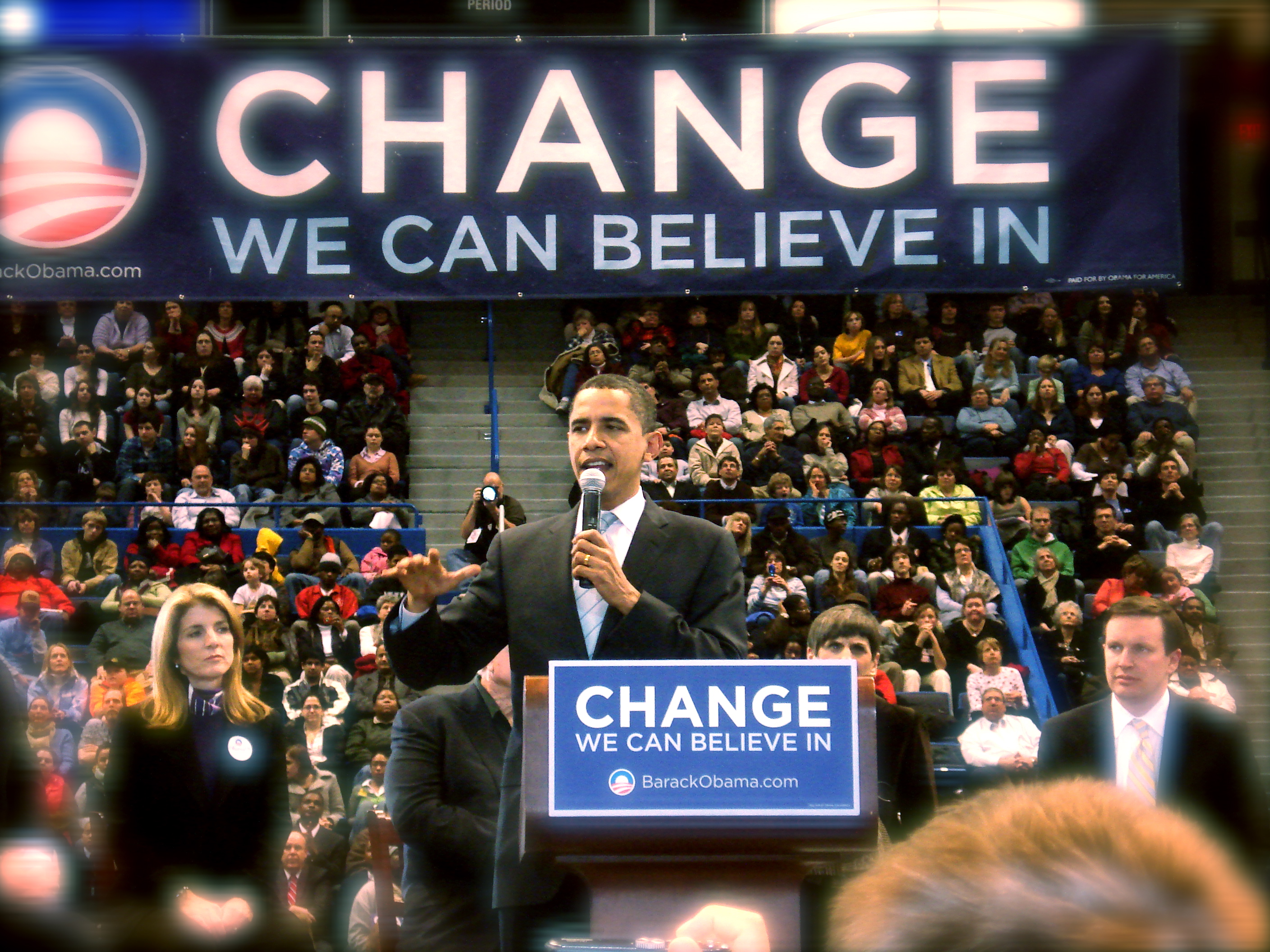
Barack Obama at a rally in Hartford, CT on February 4, 2008. Seated behind him are Caroline Kennedy, Congresswoman Rosa Delauro (D-CT) and Congressman Chris Murphy (D-CT).

After his win in South Carolina, Obama received the endorsement of Caroline Kennedy, daughter of former President John F. Kennedy, as well as Massachusetts Senator Ted Kennedy, the former President's brother. Ted Kennedy's endorsement was considered "the biggest Democratic endorsement Obama could possibly get short of Bill Clinton or Al Gore." In particular, it gave the possibility of improving Obama's support among unions, Hispanics, and traditional base Democrats, all demographics that Clinton had been stronger in to this point. Obama won 13 of 22 states on Super Tuesday (February 5, 2008): Alabama, Alaska, Colorado, Connecticut, Delaware, Georgia, Idaho, Illinois, Kansas, Minnesota, Missouri, North Dakota, and Utah. His campaign claimed to have won more delegates.

=== More February contests ===
On February 9, Obama won the Louisiana primary, as well as caucuses in Nebraska and Washington State. He garnered 57 percent of the available delegates in Louisiana and 68 percent in both Nebraska and Washington. On the same day, he won caucuses in Virgin Islands with 92 percent of the popular vote. The next day, Obama took the Maine caucuses amid what one senior Maine Democratic official called an "incredible" turnout.

The "Potomac primary" took place on February 12. It included the District of Columbia, Maryland, and Virginia. There were 168 delegates up for grabs in the three primaries. Obama won all three, taking 75 percent of the popular vote in the District of Columbia, 60 percent in Maryland, and 64 percent in Virginia. "Today, the change we seek swept through Chesapeake and over the Potomac," Obama said at a rally in Madison, Wisconsin.

On February 18, Michelle Obama attracted criticism when during a campaign speech in Milwaukee, Wisconsin she said, "Let me tell you, for the first time in my adult life, I am really proud of my country. Not just because Barack is doing well, but I think people are hungry for change." Barack's response to the criticism was, "Statements like this are made, and people try to take it out of context and make a great big deal out of it, and that isn't at all what she meant. What she meant was, this is the first time that she's been proud of the politics of America," he said. "Because she's pretty cynical about the political process, and with good reason, and she's not alone. But she has seen large numbers of people get involved in the process, and she's encouraged."

Two more primaries followed on February 19: Wisconsin and Hawaii. Obama won both decisively, taking 58 percent of the vote in Wisconsin and 14 of the 20 available national delegates in Hawaii. On February 21, Obama was announced as the winner of the week-long Democrats Abroad contest. The Democratic presidential candidate defended himself and his wife February 24 against suggestions that they are insufficiently patriotic. Obama's campaign accused Hillary Clinton's team February 25 of circulating a photo of the Illinois senator donning traditional attire – clothing worn by area Muslims – as a goodwill gesture during an overseas trip. Barack Obama and Hillary Clinton argued with each other over negative campaigning, health care, and free trade February 26. Obama and John McCain engaged in a pointed exchange over Al-Qaeda in Iraq on February 27.

=== March primaries ===
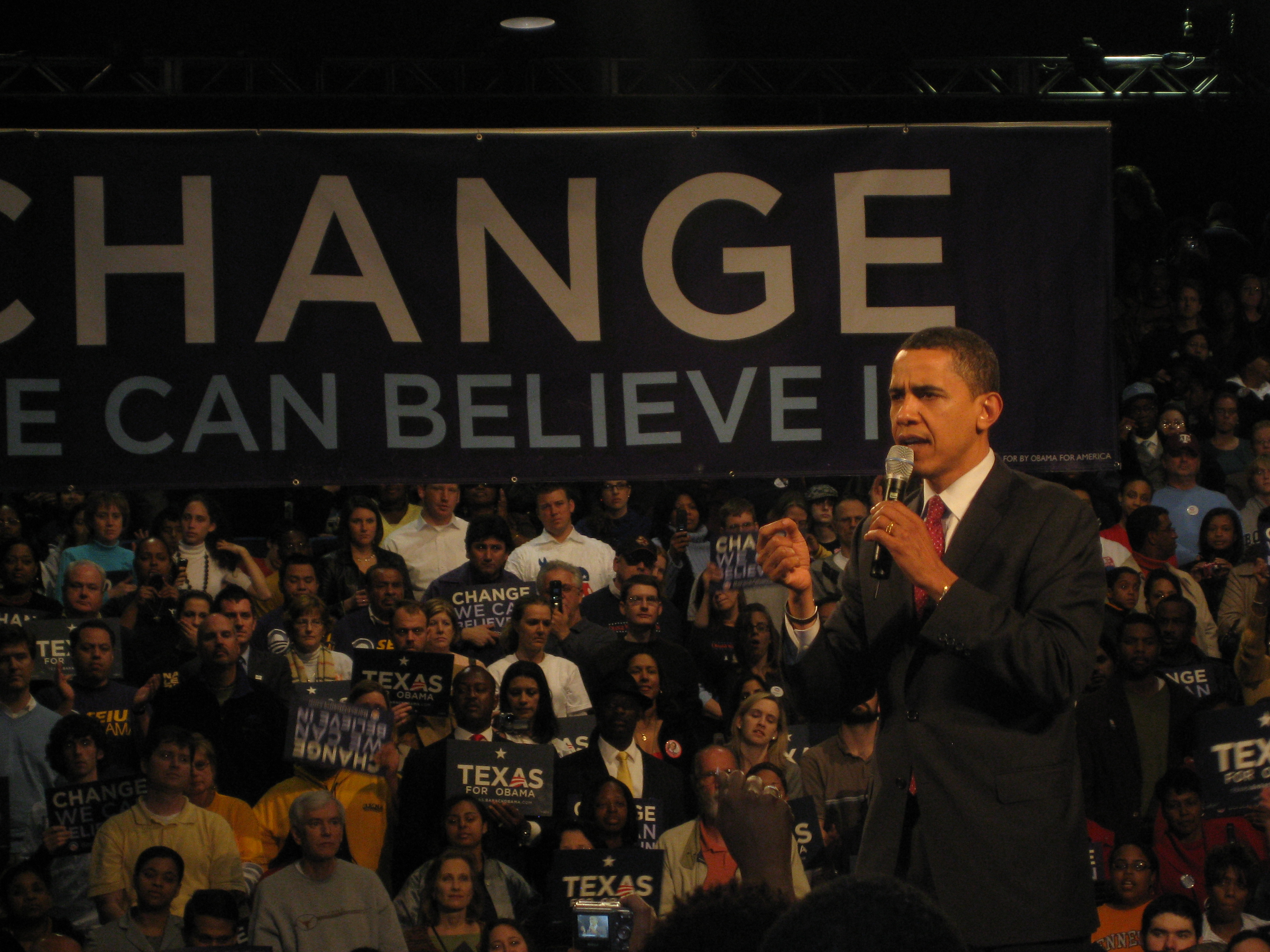
Obama campaigning in Houston on the eve of the Texas primaries and caucuses

Obama and Clinton were in a statistical dead heat in Texas, according to a poll released February 25, 2008. During Obama's sweep of February's post-Super Tuesday primaries and caucuses, the March 4 primaries of Texas and Ohio were seen as a firewall for the Clinton campaign. In early polls for these states, Clinton held double digit leads in polls for those states, but by the end of February Obama had started to erode Clinton's lead in her key demographics, and her lead had been reduced to single digits in some polls. In response to Obama's increases, Clinton's campaign began to increase their attacks on him, including an accusation of plagiarism due to similarities in Obama's campaign speeches and campaign speeches of Obama's campaign's national co-chair and Massachusetts governor, Deval Patrick, although Patrick specifically stated he told Obama to use it. During the February 21, CNN-Univision debate in Austin, Texas Obama responded to the accusation by saying, "The notion that I had plagiarized from somebody who's one of my national co-chairs, who gave me the line and suggested that I use it, I think is silly." Clinton received a round of boos from the crowd when she responded, "Lifting whole passages from someone else's speeches is not change you can believe in; it's change you can Xerox."

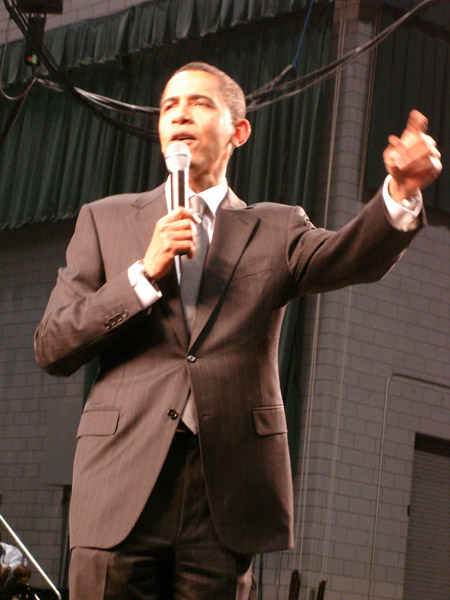
Barack Obama speaking at the Nutter Center, Wright State University, Dayton, Ohio, February 25, 2008

On February 25, 2008, during the hotly contested primaries in Texas and Ohio, Obama appeared at rallies in both Cincinnati and—for the first time in his career—in Dayton, Ohio. The noontime audience at the Fifth Third Arena at the University of Cincinnati was estimated at 13,000. That evening, in Fairborn, just outside Dayton, Obama spoke before a capacity audience estimated at over 11,000 at the Nutter Center, at Wright State University. Speaking for just under an hour, Obama charged the audience with an equal responsibility in "making things happen". According to the Dayton Daily News, "Sen. Barack Obama packed the Nutter Center like a rock star ... painting himself as a man who will cut through petty partisanship and bring real change to Washington."

In Ohio, as part of the campaign's self proclaimed goal to knock on a million doors the weekend immediately before the primary, Patrick and Kansas Governor Kathleen Sebelius spoke to Obama volunteers at volunteer rallies across the state on March 1 and 2, 2008. Obama, who had won the eleven contests in February after Super Tuesday, claimed victory in the Vermont primary and the Texas Democratic caucuses, on March 4, 2008, but lost the primaries in Texas, Ohio, and Rhode Island.

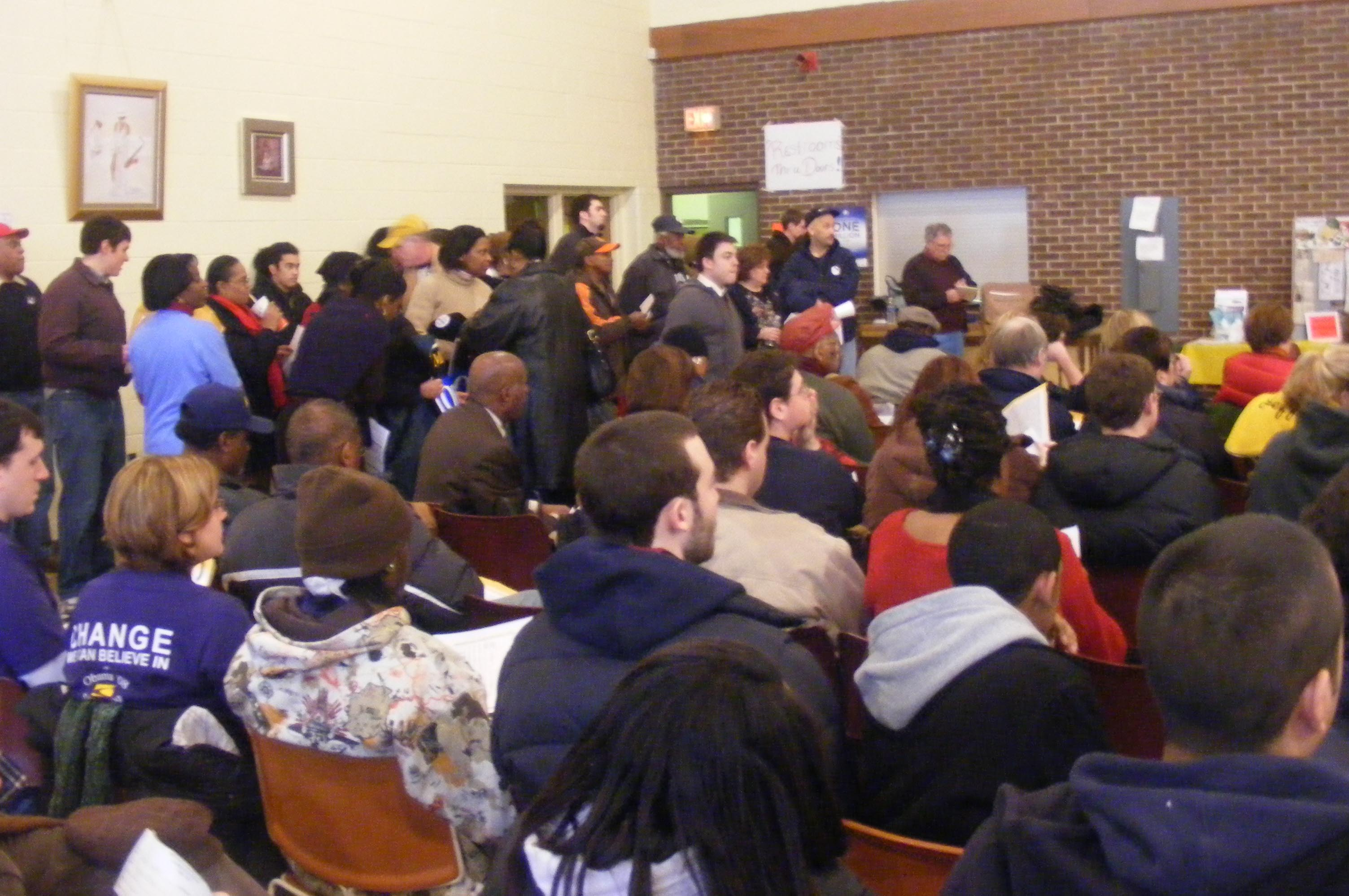
A portion of the Obama volunteers "staging" at the Mahoning Center in Youngstown, Ohio, the morning of March 1, 2008

On March 8, 2008, Obama won the Wyoming caucus by nineteen points. The Clinton camp continued to suggest that Obama would make a good vice presidential candidate for Clinton, and former President Bill Clinton made known his support of this as a "dream ticket" which would be an "almost unstoppable force". On March 10, Obama flatly rejected such suggestions. Obama noted that he, not Clinton, held the lead in pledged delegates and that he had won more of the popular vote than Clinton. "I don't know how somebody who is in second place is offering the vice presidency to somebody who is in first place", he said. He told supporters in Columbus, Mississippi, that Clinton's VP suggestion was an example of what he called "the old okey-doke", further stating that the Clinton camp was trying to "bamboozle" or "hoodwink" voters. Obama wondered aloud why the Clinton campaign believed him competent for the vice presidency, but said he was "not ready" to be president. Obama stated that the nomination process would have to be a choice between himself and Clinton, saying "I don't want anybody here thinking that 'Somehow, maybe I can get both'," by nominating Clinton as president and assuming he would be her running mate". Some suggested that it was a ploy by the Clinton campaign to denigrate Obama as less qualified for the presidency.

On March 11, 2008, Obama won the Mississippi primary. There, Obama won approximately 90 percent of the black vote, compared to Clinton's 70 percent majority of white voters. On March 11, 2008, David Axelrod demanded that Clinton sever ties with Geraldine Ferraro, a top Clinton fundraiser and 1984 Democratic vice-presidential nominee, who said publicly that Obama was a major presidential contender only because he is a black man. Obama widened his lead over Clinton in the overall delegate count when he was declared the winner of the March 4 Texas caucuses on March 12, 2008. Obama and Clinton would both statistically tie McCain in a general election matchup, according to a CNN/Opinion Research Corporation poll released March 18, 2008. The National Archives on March 19, 2008, released more than 11,000 pages of Clinton's schedule when she was first lady. Obama's campaign had pushed for release of the documents, arguing that their review was necessary to make a full evaluation of Clinton's experience as first lady. Obama and his wife, Michelle Obama, released their tax returns from 2000 to 2006 on his campaign web site March 26, 2008, and he challenged Clinton to release hers.

New Mexico Governor Bill Richardson, a former 2008 Democratic candidate, endorsed Obama on March 21. Prominent Clinton advisor James Carville pointed out that the endorsement came during the week before Easter and likened Richardson's endorsement to Judas Iscariot's biblical betrayal of Jesus Christ. Richardson had served as former President Bill Clinton's ambassador to the United Nations and Secretary of Energy. Amid controversy, a Clinton spokesman said that he would apologize had he made the comment but Carville declined to do so, further calling Richardson's decision an "egregious act". Richardson responded by refusing to "get in the gutter" with Carville and said that certain people around Clinton feel a "sense of entitlement to the presidency".

On March 20, 2008, Obama gave a preview of his strategy in a potential general election campaign against McCain. Obama blasted McCain for backing tax cuts for the wealthy without corresponding spending cuts and for his support of the Iraq war, which Obama blamed for high gasoline prices. "John McCain seems determined to carry out a third Bush term", Obama said. He added that McCain once opposed what Obama called the "irresponsible" Bush tax cuts, but now wants to make them permanent. He also asserted that McCain wants a "permanent occupation in Iraq".

=== Pennsylvania ===
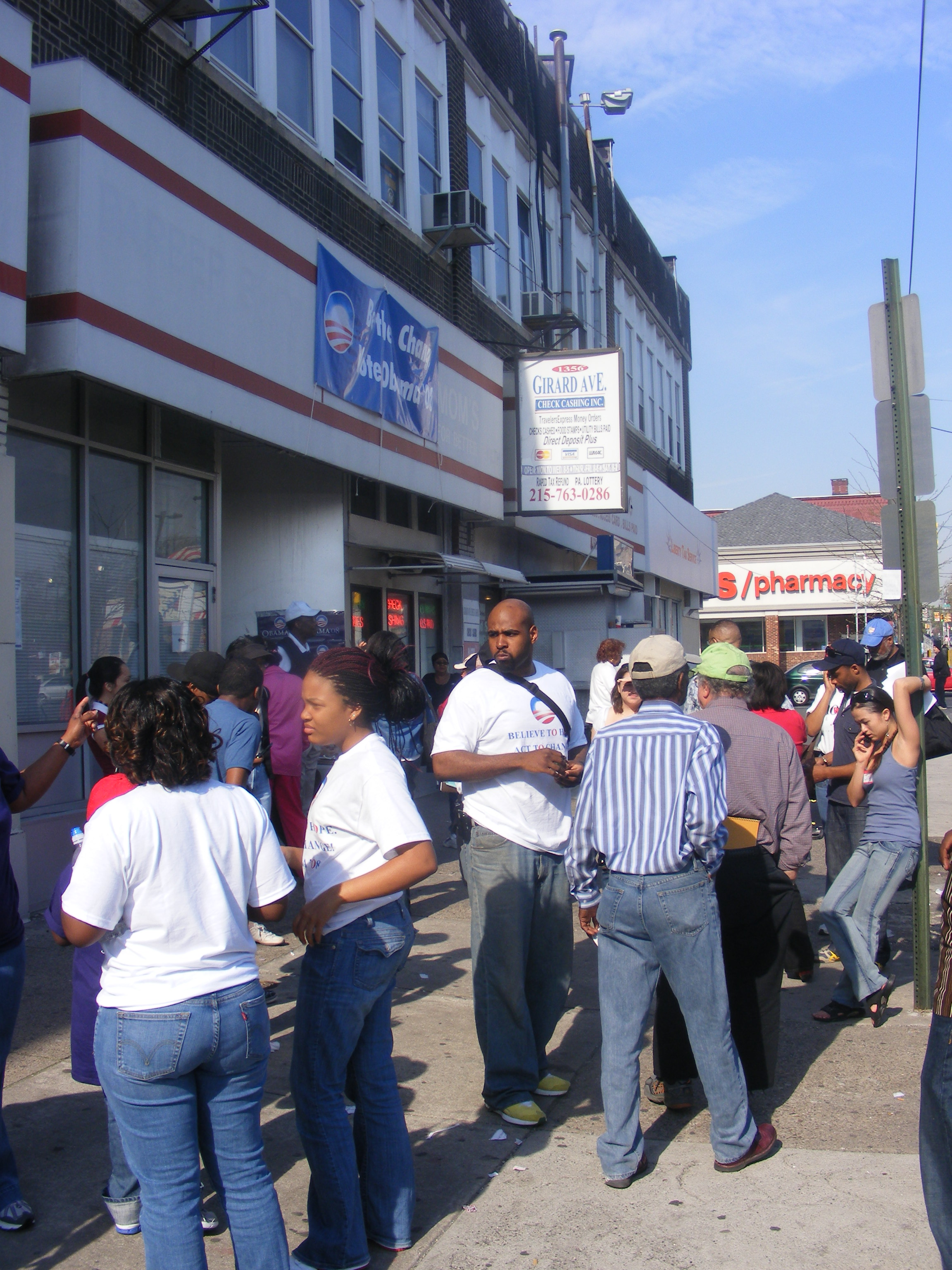
Volunteers in line Saturday morning, April 19, 2008 at the Obama campaign office in North Philadelphia. (Girard Ave. & Broad St.)

After Obama's win in Mississippi on March 11, 2008, the campaign turned its attention to Pennsylvania. Mid March polls by Rasmussen Reports, Franklin & Marshall College Poll, Quinnipiac University Polling Institute and Public Policy Polling had Obama trailing Clinton in Pennsylvania by 12 to 16 points. Dozens of campaign offices were opened around the state, including 8 in Philadelphia. By the beginning of April, polls of Pennsylvanians showed Obama trailing Clinton by an average of 5 points.

Speaking about small-town Pennsylvania at a private April 6 fundraising event in Kentfield, CA, a small suburb of San Francisco located in neighboring Marin County, his remarks would be widely criticized after they were reported:

You go into these small towns in Pennsylvania, and like a lot of small towns in the Midwest, the jobs have been gone now for 25 years and nothing's replaced them. And they fell through the Clinton Administration, and the Bush Administration, and each successive administration has said that somehow these communities are gonna regenerate and they have not. And it's not surprising, then, they get bitter, they cling to guns or religion or antipathy to people who aren't like them or anti-immigrant sentiment or anti-trade sentiment as a way to explain their frustrations.

Hillary Clinton described the remarks as "elitist, out of touch, and frankly patronizing." Noting he had not chosen his words well, Obama subsequently explained his remarks, "Lately there has been a little typical sort of political flare-up, because I said something that everybody knows is true, which is that there are a whole bunch of folks in small towns in Pennsylvania, in towns right here in Indiana, in my hometown in Illinois, who are bitter." Obama had addressed similar themes in a 2004 interview with Charlie Rose, and his strategists countered that Bill Clinton had made similar comments in 1991.

Just hours prior Obama's remarks in San Francisco, he spoke in Silicon Valley at another private event, and expressed a much more nuanced understanding of the second amendment and rural America. He stated,

We need sensible gun laws. I just got back from Montana where just about everyone has guns. In that culture, fathers and sons bond over hunting. You can't take that away from rural America. But the inner city is different, and we should tighten the laws on gun purchases and close the loopholes in gun show sales to unscrupulous buyers. The gun control people and the right to bear arms people are talking past each other about disconnected topics.

That Obama's comments in San Francisco made wide media play but not the ones he spoke in Silicon Valley became a source of speculation about the media and its political coverage.

On Friday, April 18, 2008, Obama spoke in Independence Park in Philadelphia, Pennsylvania, to a crowd of 35,000, the largest audience yet drawn during the campaign. The crowd was nearly twice what had been projected and spilled over into nearby streets. The next day, Obama conducted a whistle stop train tour from Philadelphia to Harrisburg, drawing a crowd of 6,000 at a stop in Wynnewood and 3,000 at a stop in Paoli.

The last big event in the final week of the campaign was the April 16 debate on ABC-TV. Many pundits gave the edge to Hillary Clinton, though many were critical of moderators Charles Gibson and George Stephanopoulos. A two-month-old controversy gained more exposure when Stephanopoulos questioned Obama during the debate about Obama's contacts with Weather Underground founder Bill Ayers.

Polls during the debate week showed the momentum that had cut Clinton's lead by half had stalled. Despite being outspent by three to one, Clinton would win the April 22 primary election with 54.6 percent of the vote, a solid nine-point margin over Obama's 45.4 percent. Although Clinton remained behind in delegates, the press soon ran cover stories about Obama's apparent trouble connecting with less educated whites and Catholics.

=== Indiana and North Carolina ===
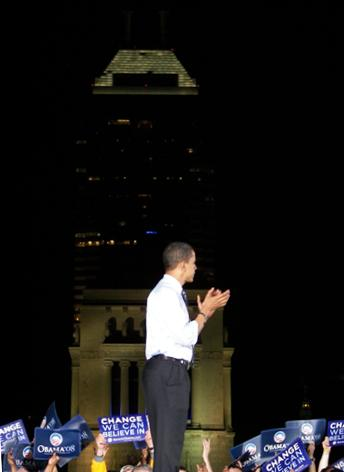
On May 5, Obama campaigned in Downtown Indianapolis at the Indiana World War Memorial Plaza, drawing a crowd of 21,000.

After Clinton's victory in Pennsylvania, the campaigns focused on the May 6 primaries in Indiana and North Carolina. 115 delegates were at stake in North Carolina, and 72 in Indiana. Polling suggested a close race in Indiana, while Obama enjoyed the advantage in North Carolina thanks in part to the state's large African-American population – a demographic from which Obama was receiving strong support throughout the primary season. Indiana's demographic makeup appeared to favor Clinton, as the state was predominantly white, rural, and culturally conservative. Clinton won states like Ohio and Pennsylvania largely because of just such a voter base. However, there were positive signs for Obama as well.

Obama got a boost in Indiana when the former head of the state's Democratic party, Joe Andrew, endorsed him. Andrew, a superdelegate, also previously served as the chairman of the Democratic National Committee from 1999 to 2001, a position he was appointed to by former President Bill Clinton. Andrew had come out behind Hillary Clinton's candidacy when she announced in 2007, and he explained that his defection to Obama was an attempt to end the protracted primary fight. He said that the Democrats were helping presumptive Republican nominee John McCain and "doing his [McCain's] work for him."

Obama won in North Carolina, capturing 56 percent of the vote, while Hillary Clinton finished with 42 percent, according to CNN. The Indiana race was much closer than expected, with Clinton, winning a 51 percent to 49 percent victory. These races were seen as Clinton's last chance to make a comeback in the nomination fight. As the results came in, ABC political analyst and former top Bill Clinton aide George Stephanopoulos declared the Democratic race "over," and NBC Washington Bureau Chief Tim Russert said, "We now know who the Democratic nominee will be." The day after these primaries, it appeared that superdelegates and party leaders were beginning to coalesce around Obama. He added four superdelegate endorsements to Clinton's one, and former Democratic presidential candidate George McGovern switched his support from Clinton to Obama.

=== West Virginia ===
In the days leading up to the May 13 West Virginia primary, Obama took the lead in committed superdelegates. He picked up seven endorsements from superdelegates the week after the May 6 primaries. Clinton won West Virginia by a 41-percentage-point margin, and told supporters that she was "more determined than ever to carry on in this campaign."

=== Kentucky and Oregon ===
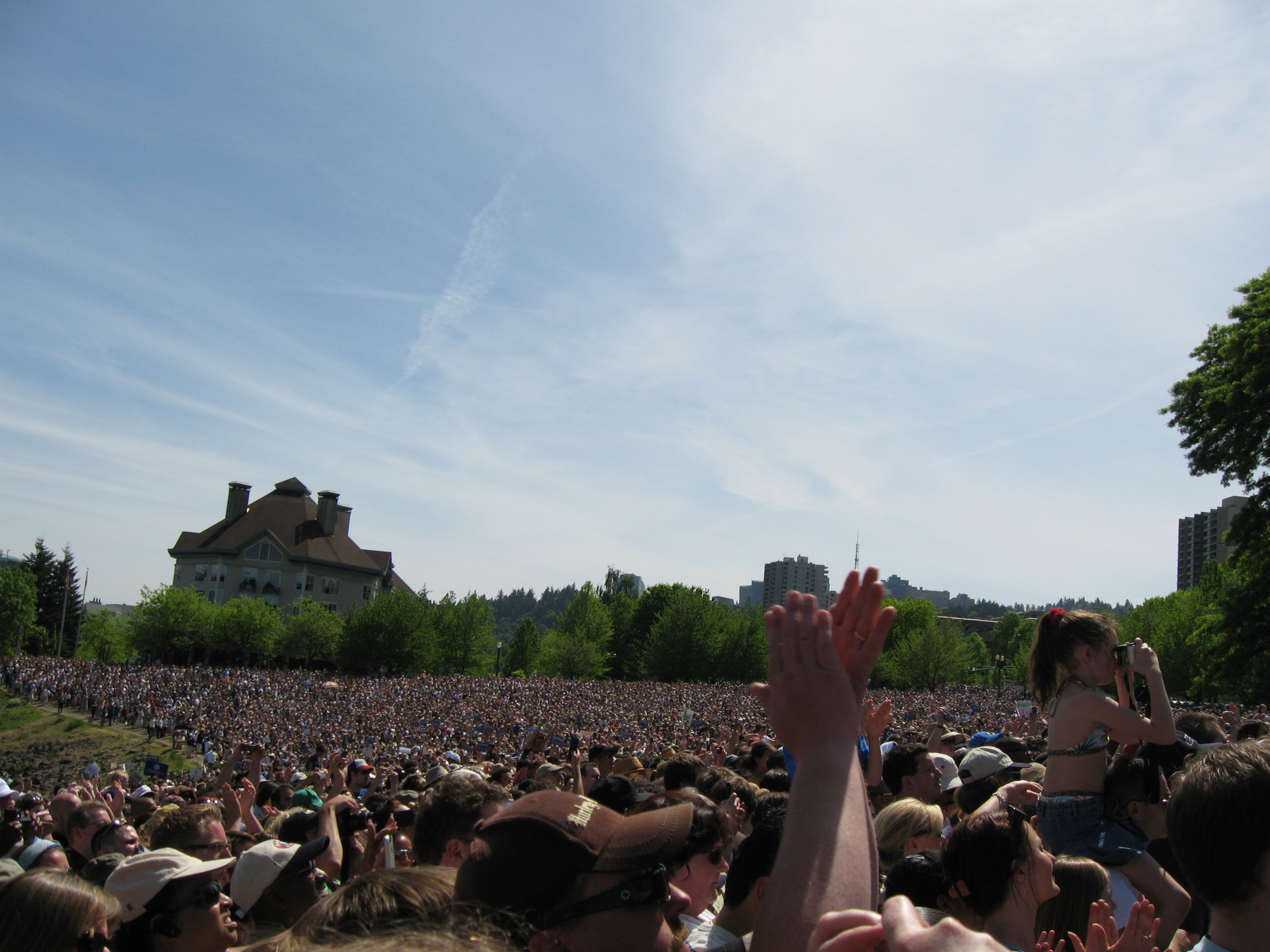
On May 18, Obama drew a crowd of 75,000 people in Portland, Oregon.

Obama continued to add to his superdelegate lead in the week before the May 20 Kentucky and Oregon primaries, and former Democratic candidate John Edwards endorsed him on May 14. As Obama's chance at becoming the nominee increased, he decided to focus much of his attention on general election battleground states. He planned to watch the Kentucky and Oregon results in Iowa, and he scheduled an appearance in Florida for later that week.

While campaigning in Oregon, Obama drew a crowd of 75,000, his largest crowd of the campaign season.

Obama won Oregon, 59 percent to Clinton's 41 percent, but lost Kentucky by a margin of 35 percent. Delegates accrued in these two contests gave him an absolute majority among pledged delegates.

=== Montana and South Dakota – wrapping up the nomination ===
After a Clinton victory on June 1 in the Puerto Rico primary, only one more day of primaries remained. June 3 saw the final votes of the primary season in Montana, which Obama won by 58-40 percent, and South Dakota, which Clinton won by 55-45 percent. Throughout the course of the day, a flood of superdelegates endorsed Obama, putting him over the top in terms of delegates needed to clinch the nomination. While campaigning in Montana in May, Obama was adopted as an honorary member of the Crow Nation and given the names "One Who Helps People Throughout the Land" and "Black Eagle".

On June 7, Clinton formally ended her candidacy and endorsed Obama, making him the party's presumptive nominee.

On July 6, 2008, during an interview with Fox News, a microphone picked up Jesse Jackson whispering to a fellow guest: "See, Barack's been talking down to black people ... I want to cut his nuts off." Jackson was expressing his disappointment in Obama's Father's Day speech chastisement of Black fathers. Only a portion of Jackson's comments were released on video. A spokesman for Fox News stated that Jackson had "referred to blacks with the N-word" in his comments about Obama; Fox News did not release the entire video or a complete transcript of his comments. Jesse Jackson, Jr. issued a statement that said "Reverend Jackson is my dad, and I'll always love him. . .I thoroughly reject and repudiate his ugly rhetoric. He should keep hope alive and any personal attacks and insults to himself." Jackson, Jr. took the statements very seriously because he had worked so hard as the National co-chair of the Obama presidential campaign. Subsequent to his Fox News interview, Jackson, Sr. apologized and reiterated his support for Obama.

=== Potential role of superdelegates ===
After the February 12 primary, the potential role of superdelegates in deciding the Democratic nomination was heavily discussed. In particular, the possibility of one candidate gaining more pledged delegates from primary and caucus wins, but losing the nomination to the other due to the decisions of superdelegates, made some Democratic leaders uncomfortable. The Clinton camp, behind in pledged delegates, advocated that superdelegates exercise their own judgment in deciding which candidate to back, while the Obama camp, ahead in pledged delegates, advocated that superdelegates follow the will of the voters and back whichever candidate had the most pledged delegates. Some party leaders, such as Speaker of the House Nancy Pelosi, argued for the latter interpretation, while others such as Democratic National Committee chair Howard Dean argued for the former. Dean also said party leaders would not force a deal, but "let the voters vote."

African American superdelegates previously pledged to Clinton, found themselves under pressure to switch to supporting Obama's candidacy; one example being John Lewis, a noted leader of the Civil Rights Movement, marcher in the Selma to Montgomery marches, US Representative from Georgia, and superdelegate, who formally switched endorsements to Obama on February 27, 2008; Representative Jesse Jackson, Jr. suggested that those staying with Clinton might face Democratic primary challenges in the future. MoveOn.org started an Internet petition to urge superdelegates to "let the voters decide between Clinton and Obama, then support the people's choice."

While Clinton was viewed as having an institutional advantage in amassing superdelegates by virtue of her fifteen years of national prominence in party politics, Obama had heavily outspent Clinton in previous contributions to superdelegates through their political action committees.

Speculation that Barack Obama had amassed about fifty additional superdelegates, removing Clinton's final advantage in the race, was reported on the eve of the March 4 primaries and caucuses; with the Clinton victory in most of that night's contests, the Obama camp chose not to release those names as expected the next day.

After Obama's large victory in North Carolina and close second in Indiana on May 6, he took the lead in committed superdelegates. The results in those two states made Obama the clear front-runner for the nomination, and he picked up endorsements from 26 superdelegates in the week after those primaries.

=== Primary voting, delegate count, and voter demographics ===
2008 Democratic presidential primaries delegate count As of June 10, 2008
Candidate	Actual pledged delegates^{1} (3,253 of 3,909 total)	Predicted pledged delegates^{2} (3,409 of 3,909 total)	Estimated superdelegates^{2} (694 of 825 total)	Estimated total delegates^{2} (4,103 of 4,934 total; 2,118 needed to win)
Barack Obama	1,661	1,763	438	2,201
Hillary Clinton	1,592	1,640	256	1,896
John Edwards	–	6	–	6
Color key	1st place Candidate has withdrawn his/her campaign			
Sources:^{1} "Primary Season Election Results". The New York Times. June 26, 2008. Archived from the original on June 26, 2008.^{2} "Election Center 2008 Primaries and Caucuses: Results: Democratic Scorecard". CNN. August 20, 2008.

Pledged Delegate margins by state. Obama won the delegate count in the darkest purple states by the largest margins, while Clinton won the delegate count in the darkest green states by the largest margins. They tied in Missouri, New Hampshire, and Guam

Popular Vote margins by state. Obama won the popular vote in the darkest purple states by the largest margins, while Clinton won the popular vote in the darkest green states by the largest margins

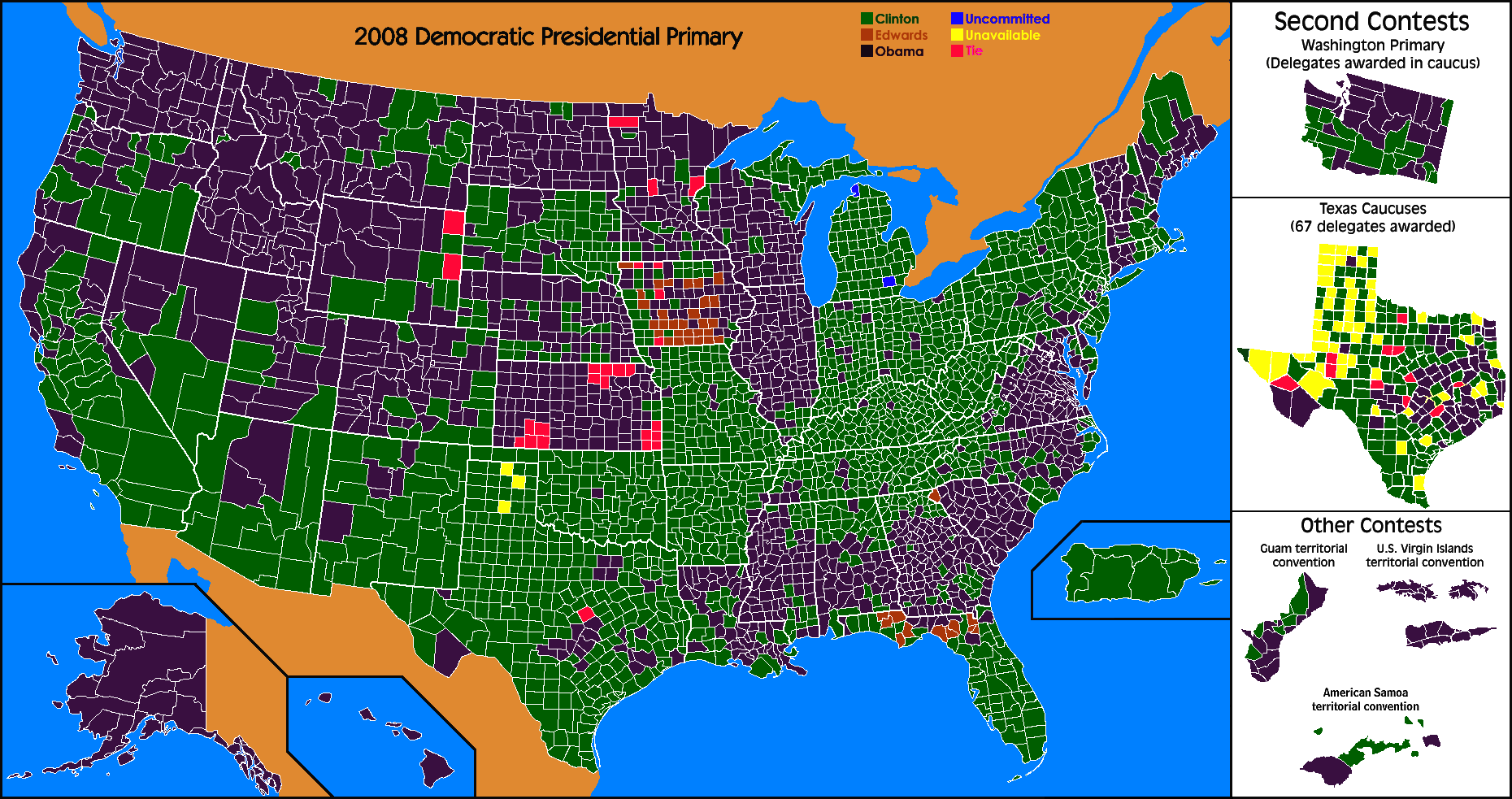
Popular Vote margins by county. Obama won the counties colored purple, Clinton won the counties colored green. Edwards won the counties colored orange, and pink counties were a delegate tie

=== Democratic National Convention ===
On August 27, Obama was awarded the Democratic presidential nomination by acclamation at the 2008 Democratic National Convention in Denver, Colorado.

== Controversies, allegations, and rumors during the primary campaign ==
=== Religion, citizenship, and loyalty ===
Various criticisms were made during the campaign concerning Obama's religious background and heritage, both by political opponents and by some members of the media.

In 2004, conservative columnist Andy Martin issued a press release alleging that Obama had "sought to misrepresent his heritage," indirectly triggering one of the first viral emails spreading false rumors about Obama's background.

The issue lay fallow for almost three years, but picked up again in late 2006, as the announcement of Obama's presidential candidacy approached. In October, a conservative blog, Infidel Bloggers Alliance, reposted Martin's press release in response to a question about Obama's heritage. Then, on December 26, conservative activist Ted Sampley, co-founder of Vietnam Veterans Against John Kerry, posted a column suggesting Obama was a secret Muslim, heavily quoting Martin's original press release. Shortly afterward, many chain e-mails began circulating claiming that Obama was a hypothetical "Manchurian Candidate". According to Hayes, one of these emails was forwarded to Snopes within hours of Sampley's story. Hayes believes that the email was likely a slightly altered version of the Sampley article, which was in turn heavily based on Martin's 2004 press release. Martin told Hayes that he got numerous calls once the emails began circulating. When the callers asked him if he wrote the release, Martin replied, "They are all my children."

In January 2007, two of the Obama campaign's first hires were opposition researchers, immediately assigned to debunk these e-mails.

On January 17, 2007, the day after Obama announced his candidacy, the Internet magazine Insight on the News published an article claiming that Clinton campaign staff had told them that Obama had attended a Muslim seminary as a child in Indonesia and that they were planning to use that information against him during the upcoming primary election campaign. The Clinton campaign quickly denounced the allegation. Investigations by CNN, ABC and others showed that Obama had not attended an Islamic school in Indonesia as Insight on the News had claimed. Obama for his first three years abroad attended St. Francis Assisi Catholic School, and in his last year he transferred to State Elementary School Menteng Besuki, an Indonesian public school for children of all faiths. A series of Chicago Tribune reports found that "[w]hen Obama attended 4th grade in 1971, Muslim children spent two hours a week studying Islam, and Christian children spent those two hours learning about the Christian religion." The series also stated: "In fact, Obama's religious upbringing in Indonesia depended more on the conventions of the schools he attended than on any decision by him, his mother or his stepfather. When he was at a Catholic school for three years, he prayed as a Catholic. When he was at a public school for a year, he learned about Islam." In May 2008 Insight on the News ceased publication.

In February 2008, a photo of Obama dressed in a turban and other local clothing while on a 2006 visit to an ethnic Somali community in Kenya appeared on the Drudge Report, which attributed it to a Clinton staffer upset at Obama getting more favorable coverage in the media than Clinton. The photo was interpreted as suggesting Muslim garb, and the Obama campaign accused the Clinton campaign of "shameful, offensive fear-mongering". A spokesman for Clinton replied that the release of the photo had not been sanctioned by the campaign—but added that "We have over 700 people on this campaign, and I'm not in a position to know what each one of them may or may not have done."

E-mails and flyers repeating allegations about Obama and other candidates were distributed to voters in Iowa and South Carolina just before they went to vote for presidential candidates. In Iowa, Obama told his supporters: "You have e-mails saying that I'm a Muslim plant that's trying to take over America. If you get this e-mail from someone you know, set the record straight." Sen. Clinton's campaign fired at least two campaign volunteers for forwarding related e-mails about Obama.

Obama's campaign organization responded with a letter from Christian leaders vouching for his Christian faith, as well as with appeals to supporters to help correct any misunderstanding. From November 2007 to January 2008, as part of a drive to promote awareness of his Christian faith, Obama gave interviews to Pat Robertson's Christian Broadcasting Network, to Christianity Today and to the religious website Beliefnet.com. Nevertheless, the false belief that Obama is a Muslim has persisted in some key demographics and is among the most frequently cited reasons for opposition to Obama in public polling. In polls taken in March and April 2008, between 10 and 15 percent of respondents believed Obama was Muslim.

While it campaigned in Kentucky in May 2008, the Obama campaign mailed out a flyer featuring Obama's Christianity.

=== Pledge of Allegiance ===
Another accusation is that Obama refuses to say the Pledge of Allegiance. This is based on a Time magazine picture of Obama listening to the U.S. National Anthem with his hands at his sides while the others on stage have their right hands over their hearts. He does, in fact, say the Pledge and sometimes led the Senate in doing so.

=== Obama's name ===
Some conservative opponents of Obama featured his middle name "Hussein" and the similarity of his last name with "Osama" to suggest that he has Muslim heritage or possible associations with terrorists, or to question his loyalty to the United States (both "Barack" and "Hussein" are names of Semitic origin that mean, respectively, to bless/blessing and good/handsome). In February 2008, the Tennessee Republican Party circulated a memo titled "Anti-Semites for Obama" that featured his middle name and showed a picture of him in African clothes while on a trip to Africa. A website, ExposeObama.com, sent out emails in early 2008 that included messages such as "President Barack Hussein Obama ... the scariest four words in the English language!" In April 2008 a church in the small town of Jonesville, South Carolina posted a message on its sign which said, "Obama, Osama—humm, are they brothers." The next day Roger Byrd, the pastor, removed the sign after receiving "so much negative comments from throughout the country." Those incidents attracted nationwide media coverage, and were generally condemned by the other candidates' official campaigns and by the major political parties.

=== Impact of Rev. Jeremiah Wright ===
In March 2008, a controversy broke out concerning Obama's 20-year relationship to his former pastor Jeremiah Wright. ABC News found and excerpted clips from racially and politically charged sermons by Rev. Wright, including his assertion that the United States brought on the 9/11 attacks with its own terrorism and his assertion that "[t]he government lied about inventing the HIV virus as a means of genocide against people of color." Some of Wright's statements were widely criticized as anti-American. After negative media coverage and a drop in the polls, Obama responded by condemning Wright's remarks, ending his relationship with the campaign and delivering a speech entitled "A More Perfect Union" at the Constitution Center in Philadelphia, Pennsylvania. In the speech, Obama rejected some of Wright's comments, but refused to disown the man himself, noting his lifelong ministry to the poor and past service as a US Marine. The speech, which sought to place Wright's anger in a larger historical context, was well received by liberal sources and some conservatives, but other conservatives and supporters of Hillary Clinton continued to question the implications of Obama's long relationship with Wright.

The story gained headlines again in late April with several public appearances by Rev. Wright. He appeared on the Bill Moyers show on PBS on April 25, spoke to the NAACP in Detroit on April 27 and addressed the media before a symposium at the National Press Club on April 28. In Detroit, Wright "also defended Obama and lashed out at the news media for running excerpts of his heated sermons, media pundits and those who have tried to connect him to Islam because of his full name—Barack Hussein Obama." At the Press Club, Wright said that Obama "had to distance himself from me, because he's a politician." He also suggested that Obama is not a regular attendee at church, and reiterated his earlier views on terrorism, HIV, and other issues. Obama held a press conference on April 29 in which he went further than he had in his Pennsylvania speech, appearing to disown the pastor himself rather than just his controversial remarks. Obama said he was "outraged" and "saddened" by Wright's comments, calling them "divisive and destructive." He said of Wright, "the man I saw yesterday was not the man I met 20 years ago." Obama stated, "Whatever relationship I had with Reverend Wright has changed as a consequence of this," he added.

Obama subsequently resigned his membership in the Trinity United Church of Christ after comments made during a guest sermon at the church by Catholic priest and long-term Obama friend, Michael Pfleger. During the sermon, Pfleger mocked Hillary Clinton and said that she felt "entitled" to be the Democratic nominee for President.

=== NAFTA controversy ===
In February 2008, a Canadian diplomatic memo surfaced, which alleged that Obama's economic advisor Austan Goolsbee had met with Canadian consular officials in Chicago and told them to disregard Obama's campaign rhetoric regarding the North American Free Trade Agreement (NAFTA), a charge the Obama campaign later denied.

Ian Brodie (Chief of Staff in Stephen Harper's Prime Minister's Office), during the media lockup for the February 26, 2008, budget, stopped to chat with several journalists and was surrounded by a group from CTV. The conversation turned to the pledges to renegotiate NAFTA made by the two Democratic contenders, Obama and Clinton. Brodie, apparently seeking to play down the potential impact on Canada, told the reporters that the threat was not serious and that someone from Clinton's campaign had even contacted Canadian diplomats to tell them not to worry because the NAFTA threats were mostly political posturing. The Canadian Press news agency quoted that source as saying that Brodie said that someone from Clinton's campaign called and was "telling the embassy to take it with a grain of salt". The Clinton campaign denied it. "We flatly deny the report," said Clinton spokesperson Phil Singer. "We did not sanction nor would we ever sanction anyone to say any such a thing. We give the Canadian government blanket immunity to reveal the name of anyone in the Clinton campaign think they heard from."

The story was followed by CTV's Washington bureau chief, Tom Clark, who reported that Obama's campaign, not Clinton's, had reassured Canadian diplomats. Clark cited unnamed Canadian sources in his initial report. Media later reported the source as Canadian Ambassador Michael Wilson. There was no explanation at the time for why Brodie was said to have referred to the Clinton campaign, but the news report was about the Obama campaign. Robert Hurst, president of CTV News, declined to comment.

The Prime Minister's communications director, Sandra Buckler, said that Brodie "does not recall" discussing the issue. On March 4, 2008, Harper initially denied that Brodie was a source of the leak—but he appeared to be referring to a diplomatic memo that described the key conversation between an adviser to Obama and Canada's consul-general in Chicago, Georges Rioux. Harper did not appear to be distinguishing between the two leaks later in the day. Harper asked the top civil servant, Clerk of the Privy Council Kevin Lynch, to call in an internal security team, with the help of Foreign Affairs. Members of the opposition asserted that an internal inquiry was unlikely to look seriously at Harper's own high-level political aides and appointees, such as Brodie or Wilson, Canada's ambassador to Washington.

On March 10, 2008, Canadian MP Navdeep Bains called on Canadian Ambassador to the United States Michael Wilson to step down as Canada's ambassador to Washington while the leaks were investigated. Wilson publicly acknowledged that he spoke to CTV reporter Tom Clark, who first reported the leaks before the story aired, but refused to discuss what was said.

=== Passport issues ===
There were three separate incidents involving Obama's State Department passport file in 2008. Although these occurred over a three-month span, Obama was notified only on March 20, as upper levels of the State Department themselves first became aware of the breaches. On March 21, 2008, the United States Department of State revealed that Obama's passport file was improperly accessed three times in 2008. Three contract employees are accused in the wrongdoing. One, who works for The Analysis Corporation (TAC), accessed Obama and McCain's records and was disciplined. The two other workers, who worked for Stanley, Inc., each accessed Obama's file on separate occasions and were fired. An unauthorized access of Hillary Clinton's file was also made in mid-2007, but was considered a training error and unrelated to the other instances. John O. Brennan, president and CEO of Analysis, is a consultant to the Barack Obama campaign and contributed $2,300 to the Obama campaign in January 2008. Brennan was a former senior CIA official and former interim director of the National Counterterrorism Center. The chairman of Stanley Inc., Philip Nolan, is a Clinton supporter and contributor; his company had contracts with the United States Department of State since 1992 and was awarded a $570 million contract to continue providing support for passport processing.

== Effect of the Internet ==
=== Social networking sites ===
Many commentators noted Obama's strong support on social networking sites such as MySpace and Facebook.com. An Internet consulting site, tracking each candidate's online performance, measured Obama as the candidate that connected the most with potential voters via the Internet.

Chris Hughes, a Facebook co-founder and coordinator of online organizing within the Barack Obama presidential campaign, called the on-line surge backing Obama "unprecedented".

One group on Facebook, "Barack Obama (One Million Strong for Barack)", had 894,913 members as of November 5, 2008. Obama's politician page reached more than one million supporters as of June 17, 2008. On February 2, 2007, Obama attended a rally at George Mason University organized by "Students for Barack Obama", a group that began on Facebook, with several thousand in attendance. Citizens from other countries also registered Facebook groups in support of Obama, including Canada and several European countries.

Obama's official website itself incorporated networking elements which allowed supporters to create their own profiles and blogs, as well as to chat and plan grassroots events. My.BarackObama.com is a social networking website created by the campaign. It was first launched on February 11, 2007, and was billed as "a MySpace for his supporters". It was built and designed by Internet technology and political strategist firm Blue State Digital and Chris Hughes.

The site grew to over 70,000 registered users, and the Obama campaign credited the online social networking tool with increasing fundraising and event turnout. Other presidential candidates subsequently created their own social networking websites, such as McCain's "McCainSpace".

The bulk of My.BarackObama.com's activity took place in group and event organization, where members first created or joined on-line groups which shared common email lists and blogs. These groups were then used to plan offline events, ranging from casual "meet ups" to large fundraising events, with those who signed up for fundraising events via My.BarackObama.com having the option of fulfilling their fundraising promise in advance through online payment. More than 100,000 individual donors contributed to the $25 million raised by the Obama for America campaign in the first quarter of 2007; over $6 million of that amount was raised through on-line channels.

=== Viral videos ===
The Obama primary campaign has received publicity from the introduction of several high-profile music videos concerning the senator. The first was an off-topic parody song portraying a fictional love between Obama and a provocatively dressed young woman nicknamed "Obama Girl", entitled I Got a Crush... on Obama, first appearing on June 13, 2007. The second video was Yes We Can, after the ubiquitous Obama campaign slogan, itself originally a long-standing union chant in the US. It was released on February 2, 2008, and was a straightforward, star-studded endorsement by a range of actors, musicians, and other celebrities, led by Grammy-winner will.i.am of The Black Eyed Peas, singing the actual words of an Obama speech after the New Hampshire primary. The video was generating over a million views on YouTube a day after its release. By March 27, 2008, the song had been viewed over 17 million times on YouTube and other sites.

The video of Obama's speech A More Perfect Union also "went viral", reaching over 1.3 million views on YouTube within a day of the speech's delivery. Links to the speech were among the most widely shared on Facebook, and by March 27, the speech had been viewed nearly 3.4 million times.

During a time when Obama was receiving negative attention from the Wright controversy and other issues, "The Empire Strikes Barack" was released, a video that featured Barack Obama as Luke Skywalker, rallying from attacks by Hillary Clinton, portrayed as Darth Vader.

== Political positions ==
Obama has taken positions on many national, political, economic and social issues, either through public comments or his senatorial voting record.

One such position is Obama's stance on health care. Obama has repeatedly said that he wants to see that every American has the option of having affordable health care as good as every U. S. Senator has. He has proposed a major overhaul of the nation's health care system, aimed at covering the nearly 45 million uninsured Americans, reducing premium costs for everyone else, and breaking what he asserted was "the stranglehold" that the biggest drug and insurance companies have on the health care market.

== Opinion polling ==
After Obama's interview on Meet the Press, opinion polling organizations added his name to surveyed lists of Democratic candidates. The first such poll (November 2006) ranked Obama in second place with 17 percent support among Democrats after Hillary Clinton (D-NY) who placed first with 28 percent of the responses. A Zogby Poll released on January 18, 2007, showed Obama leading the Democratic contenders in the first primary state of New Hampshire with 23 percent of New Hampshire Democrats supporting Obama. Clinton and John Edwards were tied for second place with 19 percent each. A Washington Post/ABC News poll on February 26–27, 2007 placed Obama in second place with 24 percent among likely Democratic primary voters, with Hillary Clinton garnering 36 percent as the leader.

Opinion polls taken in April 2007 differ widely from each other: Obama was listed in third place nationwide, 24 percent behind Hillary Clinton and 2 percent behind John Edwards. In an April 30, 2007 Rasmussen Reports Poll, Barack Obama led the poll for the Democratic nomination for first time with 32 percent support. By June however, Clinton was winning all the major national polls by double digits except one that showed Obama with a one-point lead, and by July, all major national polls showed Obama trailing Clinton by double digits.

Polling analysts are expected to take note of whether opinion polling statistics regarding Obama prove to be accurate, or are ultimately subject to the so-called "Bradley effect" observed in some previous American elections. This continued to be a concern in some earlier primary states, but as the season progressed Obama showed electoral success with white voters in states like Virginia and Wisconsin.

In a poll by the University of Iowa in July and August 2007 of Iowa Republicans, Obama received the third-highest percentage, with 7 percent of the vote—more than Republican candidates Mike Huckabee, Sam Brownback, and to-be nominee John McCain combined. Polls by The Washington Post and ABC News indicated that Republicans and independents were more likely than Democrats to answer that Obama would be the Democrats' best chance to win the election.

At the end of March 2008, Obama became the first candidate to open a double-digit lead in his national Gallup daily tracking poll results since Super Tuesday, when his competitor Hillary Clinton had a similar margin. On March 30, the poll showed Obama at 52 percent and Clinton at 42 percent. The Rassmussen Reports poll, taken during the same time frame, also showed an Obama advantage of five points. Another late-March poll found Obama maintaining his positive rating and limiting his negative rating better than his chief rival, Clinton. The NBC News and The Wall Street Journal poll showed Obama losing two points of positive rating and gaining four points of negative rating, while Clinton lost eight points of positive rating and gained five points of negative rating. A Newsweek poll taken on April 16–17 showed Obama leading Clinton 54 to 35 percent among Democrats and Democratic-leaning registered voters. The Gallup daily tracking poll showed Obama's lead over Clinton in the same group peaking at 51 to 40 percent on April 14 (results based on interviews April 11–13), then closing, and on April 19 (results based on interviews April 16–18) Clinton gained a lead of 46 to 45 percent, the first time Obama had not led since March 18–20. The next day Obama showed a lead of 47 to 45 percent over Clinton. The next day the Obama lead over Clinton increased to 49 percent over 42 percent.

== Endorsements ==
Chicago Mayor Richard M. Daley endorsed Obama hours after his announcement, abandoning his tradition of staying neutral in Democratic primaries. A day later, Obama traveled to Ames, Iowa where he was endorsed by Iowa Attorney General Tom Miller and State Treasurer Michael Fitzgerald. Just days before the crucial New York Democratic primary, Obama won the endorsement of the Young Democrats Club of Pelham, a key endorsement considering 16 percent of the club supported Hillary Clinton. Perhaps Obama's biggest celebrity endorsement is talk show host Oprah Winfrey, who has occasionally joined Obama on the campaign trail and hosted a fundraiser at her Santa Barbara, CA estate. After his win in South Carolina Obama received the endorsement of Caroline Kennedy, the daughter of President John F. Kennedy, and Ted Kennedy, his brother.

For the first time in its ten-year history, MoveOn.org endorsed a presidential candidate when Obama received 70 percent of an online ballot the organization held of its members. On February 3, 2008, another member from the Kennedy family, First Lady of California Maria Shriver, announced her endorsement for Obama. On February 26, former Democratic candidate Chris Dodd endorsed Obama, followed on March 21 by another former Democratic candidate, then-New Mexico governor and retired United Nations ambassador Bill Richardson. Richardson served under President Bill Clinton as Secretary of Energy and as a United Nations ambassador. Former President Jimmy Carter stated that he supports Obama for president. On May 14, former Democratic presidential candidate John Edwards endorsed Obama, hinting that he believed the race was over and that it was time to unite behind one candidate. On May 19, President pro tempore of the United States Senate Sen. Robert Byrd (D-WV) endorsed Obama. The 90-year-old Senate legend lauded Obama as a "shining young statesman" a "noble-hearted patriot", and a "humble Christian." In particular, Byrd said that his shared opposition to the Iraq War with Obama was a key factor in his decision. On June 7, 2008, Sen. Hillary Clinton endorsed Sen. Obama after conceding her bid for the presidency and even adopted his slogan "Yes We Can" into her concession speech. On June 16, 2008, Al Gore endorsed Obama in a speech given in Michigan, stating "take it from me, elections matter." Gore also endorsed Obama on his website, algore.com, and appears on Obama's website, offering an official endorsement. On October 19, 2008, during a Meet The Press interview, former Secretary of State Colin Powell endorsed Obama.

== Fundraising ==
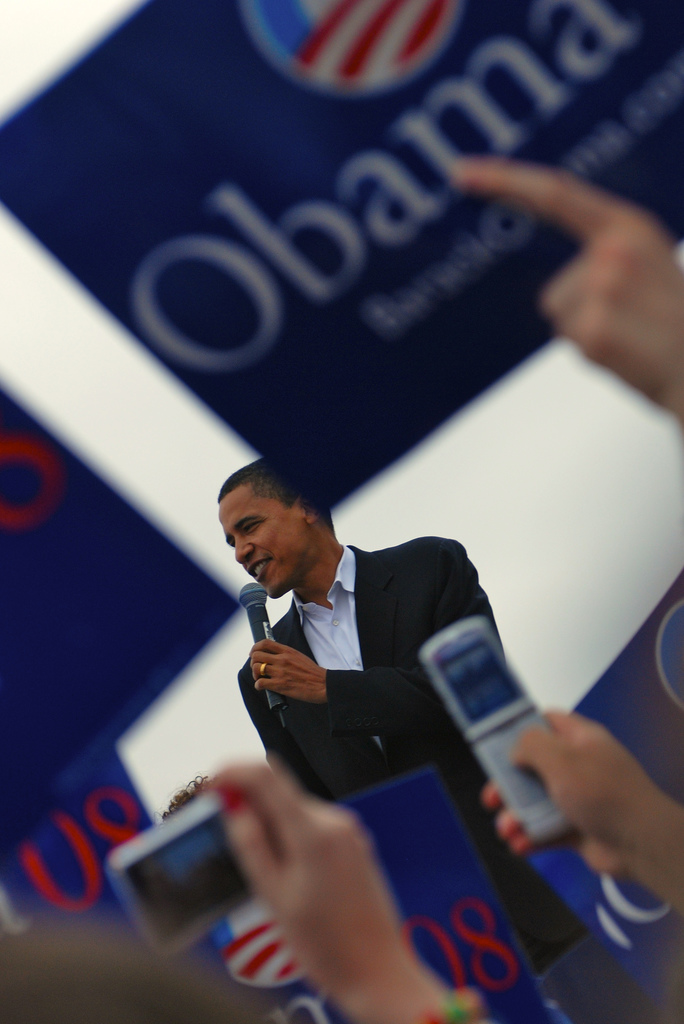
Obama rallying support in Austin, Texas, February 2007

Hyatt board member Penny Pritzker served as the national finance chair of the campaign; Pritzker served on the finance committee for Obama's 2004 Senate run. Obama has said he will not accept donations from federal lobbyists or political action committees during the campaign. While he started to collect private donations for a general election account, Obama asked the Federal Election Commission if he could later return the money if he decided to take public funds. In response, the FEC allowed presidential candidates to take contributions for a general election campaign even if they later decided to accept public money.

Alan D. Solomont, who led a group that raised $35 million for John Kerry in 2004, signed on with the campaign, saying Obama "is the sort of person America wants in the White House right now." Other fundraisers that joined the campaign included David Geffen, Jeffrey Katzenberg, and Mark Gorenberg.

Obama's fundraising prowess early on matched that of Hillary Clinton's and, financially speaking, stayed competitive with her. On April 4, 2007, Obama's campaign announced that they had raised $25 million in the first quarter of 2007, coming close to Hillary Clinton's $26 million in first quarter contributions. Over 100,000 people donated to the campaign, and $6.9 million was raised through the Internet. $23.5 million of Obama's first quarter funds can be used in the primary, the highest of any candidate.

Obama's fundraising skills were affirmed again in the second quarter of 2007, when his campaign received $32.5 million in donations: $5.5 million more than his nearest rival, Hillary Clinton, whose campaign raised around $27 million. Obama's 258,000 individual donors revealed his wide grassroots appeal and success raising funds via the Internet. Altogether Obama's campaign raised US$58 million during the first half of 2007, topping all other candidates and exceeding previous records for the first six months of any year before an election year.

For the third quarter of 2007, which typically sees lower numbers than the rest of the year, Obama raised $20 million, still a large amount but bested by Clinton, who led all candidates with $27 million raised. Obama's campaign reported adding 108,000 new donors through in the quarter, for a total of 365,000 individual contributors in the first nine months.

In the fourth quarter of 2007, Obama raised $23.5 million, while Clinton raised $27.3 million. By January 2008, Obama had received over 800,000 donations from over 600,000 individual donors.

The Obama campaign raised $32 million in the month of January 2008 alone, from over 250,000 separate supporters. When it was disclosed that Hillary Clinton loaned $5 million of her own money to her campaign, Obama's supporters donated over $6.5 million in less than 24 hours. When the Clinton campaign reported that it had raised over $10 million in the five days after Super Tuesday, the Obama campaign reported raising "well more" than that.

Candidate financial disclosures released after the Wisconsin and Hawaii primaries raised Barack Obama's estimated January take to $37 million, about $17 million more than the second-placed candidate Hillary Clinton. Much of her fundraising was furthermore ineligible for primary-contest spending, and her campaign is projected to have ended the month in debt by over eight million dollars, one-quarter of that being unpaid fees to consultant Mark Penn. In February, the Obama campaign surpassed the one million donor mark, a first for a competitive primary campaign in the United States and raised $55 million, setting a record for political fundraising in one month. Of the $55 million raised in February $45 million of it was contributed over the Internet—without Obama hosting a single fund-raiser.

According to reports filed with the FEC and news from the Boston Herald, by the end of the first quarter of 2008, the campaign had raised more money ($133,549,000) than it had raised in all of 2007 (103,802,537). By the end of March, Obama had raised a total of over $235 million during the course of his campaign.

== General election ==
On June 3, 2008, after the Montana and South Dakota primaries, Barack Obama secured enough delegates to clinch the nomination of the Democratic party for president of the United States. His opponent, Republican party nominee John McCain, passed the delegate threshold to become the presumptive nominee much earlier, on March 4. On June 7, Obama's remaining opponent in the quest for the Democratic nomination, Hillary Clinton, conceded defeat at a rally in Washington and urged supporters to back Obama.

== See also ==
- Deadheads for Obama, a reunion concert of three former members of the Grateful Dead musical group in San Francisco.
- Electoral history of Barack Obama
- Republican and conservative support for Barack Obama in 2008
- Sí Se Puede Cambiar, a song and music video created in support of Obama
