= Edith S. Childs =

American politician (born 1949)

Member of the Greenwood County Council
- Succeeded by: Teresa Griffin

Personal details
- Born: 1949 (age 76–77) South Carolina, US
- Party: Democratic

Edith S. Childs (born 1949) is an American politician who served on the Greenwood, South Carolina, county council. President Barack Obama has credited her with coining his campaign slogan: "Fired up! Ready to go!"

== Background ==
Childs was born in 1949, in South Carolina. She attended Brewer High School in Greenwood, where she studied health; and graduated in 1967. After retiring as a licensed practical nurse she became local activist in her community. She started an anonymous hotline in Greenwood County to help seniors who were being preyed on by criminals and feared retribution if they called police. After retiring as a licensed practical nurse, she studied criminal justice and became a private investigator.

== Political career ==
In 1994, Childs ran for an at-large seat on the Greenwood School District 50 board of trustees. She served on the school board until 1998. In 1999, she ran for and won a seat on the Greenwood County Council, representing District 1.

Much of her efforts have centered on establishing after school programs for the community's youth, providing holiday meals for the unemployed, obtaining funding for a new rec center and providing school supplies for underprivileged youth.

In March 2022, Childs announced her decision not to run for re-election to Greenwood County Council. She was succeeded by Democrat Teresa Griffin.

=== Controversy ===
In July 2013, the South Carolina ethics commission leveled a fine against Childs for what it found to be inappropriate spending of "in district" funds. The commission found that she used $100 to make personal donations to nonprofits outside Greenwood County. One of the contributions was $50 paid to put an advertisement in the program for a local beauty pageant.

== 2008 Presidential primary ==
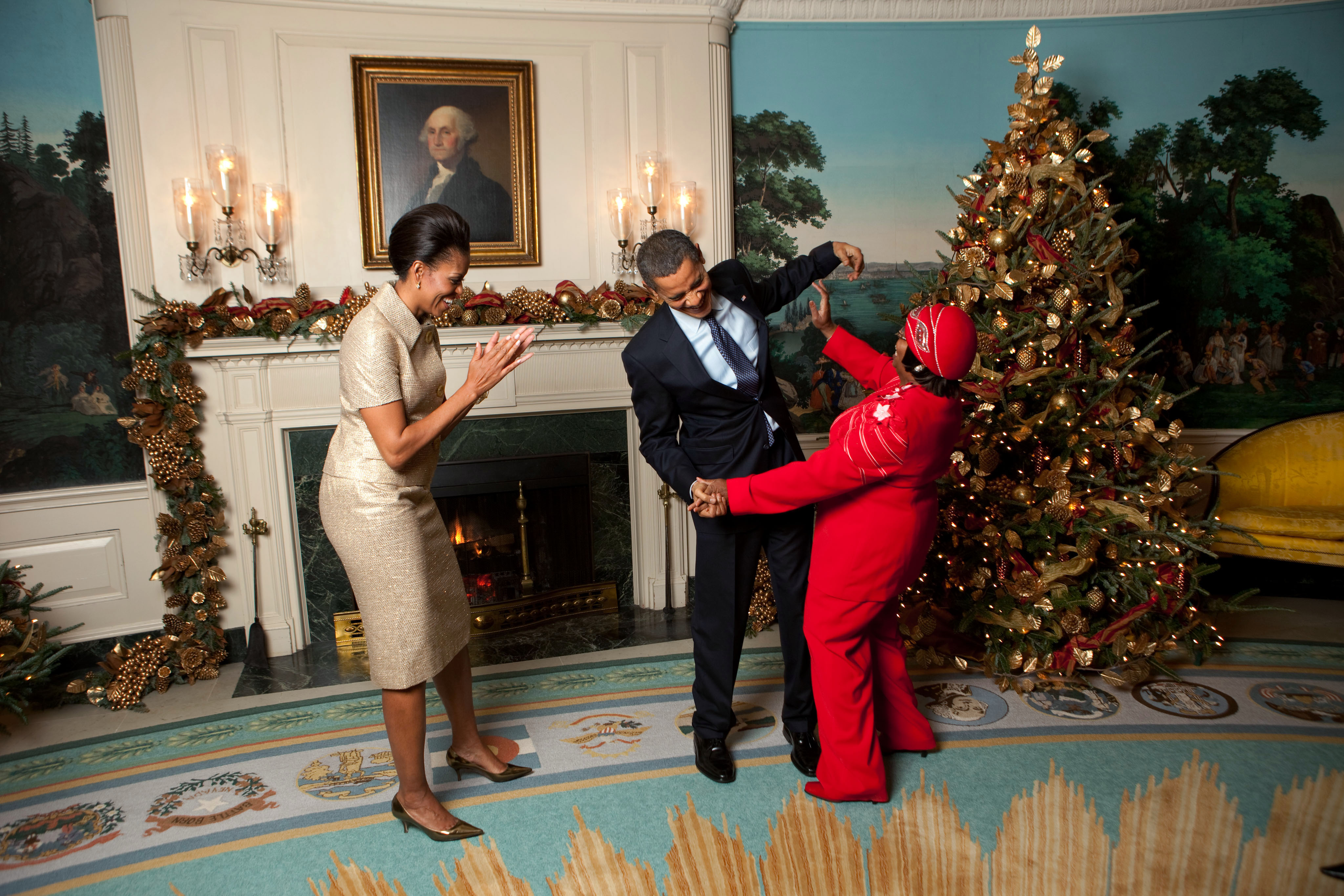
President Barack Obama and First Lady Michelle Obama greet Childs at a holiday party in 2009.

In June 2007, then-Senator and presidential hopeful Barack Obama visited the small town of Greenwood, South Carolina (population 29,000) as part of his campaign efforts. When he arrived at the town's civic center, late at night and in a driving rain, he was surprised to find a room of only 30 supporters. Childs, noticing the look on the candidate's face, yelled out to those assembled, "Fired up!" The room responded, "Fired up!" Obama, surprised by the enthusiasm, turned around to see Childs as she continued, "Ready to go!", to which the room again responded, "Ready to go!" Soon after the campaign stop in Greenwood, the same chant was repeated at a larger Obama rally in Aiken, South Carolina. (Note: see the Aiken video here:) Before long, volunteers were carrying signs and wearing shirts printed with the slogan. The national press picked up on the craze; CNN interviewed her in Greenwood, and the Los Angeles Times and The Washington Post also interviewed her. She flew to New York to appear on CBS. When a Japanese reporter wrote a story on her, in Japanese, the president of Greenwood's Fujifilm plant translated it for her. In December 2009, almost a year after he assumed office, President Obama invited Childs to the White House for the first holiday celebration hosted by the Obamas. She has been described by Valerie Jarrett as a "symbol of the power in each American to change our country".

== 2012 Presidential primary ==
Childs was chosen by her party to be part of the South Carolina delegation to the 2012 Democratic National Convention. There she led the 'fired up" chant again, but this time in front of 20,000 delegates and their guests and a national TV audience.
