= Talking past each other =

Social phenomena

"Talking past each other" is an English phrase sometimes used to describe the situation where two or more people talk about different subjects, while believing that they are talking about the same thing.

David Horton wrote that when characters in fiction 'talk past each other,' the effect is to expose "an unbridgeable gulf between their respective perceptions and intentions. The result is an exchange, but never an interchange, of words in fragmented and cramped utterances whose subtext often reveals more than their surface meaning." His usage of single quotes around the phrase indicates the colloquial nature of it.

The phrase might be used in widely varying contexts. For example, a book written in 1973, referred to certain dawn-to-dusk discussions of physics between Albert Einstein and David Hilbert in 1917, which they continued in writing, and Felix Klein notes that they "talked past each other, as happens not infrequently between simultaneously producing mathematicians."

== See also ==
- Essentially contested concept – Problem in philosophy
- Semantic change – Evolution of a word's meaning
- Contronym – Word that has two opposing meanings
- Irrelevant conclusion – Type of informal fallacy
