= Hillary Clinton presidential campaign developments, 2007 =

Hillary Rodham Clinton began developing her first campaign for the presidency in 2007, as part of the United States presidential election, 2008.

== Early opposition from two sides ==
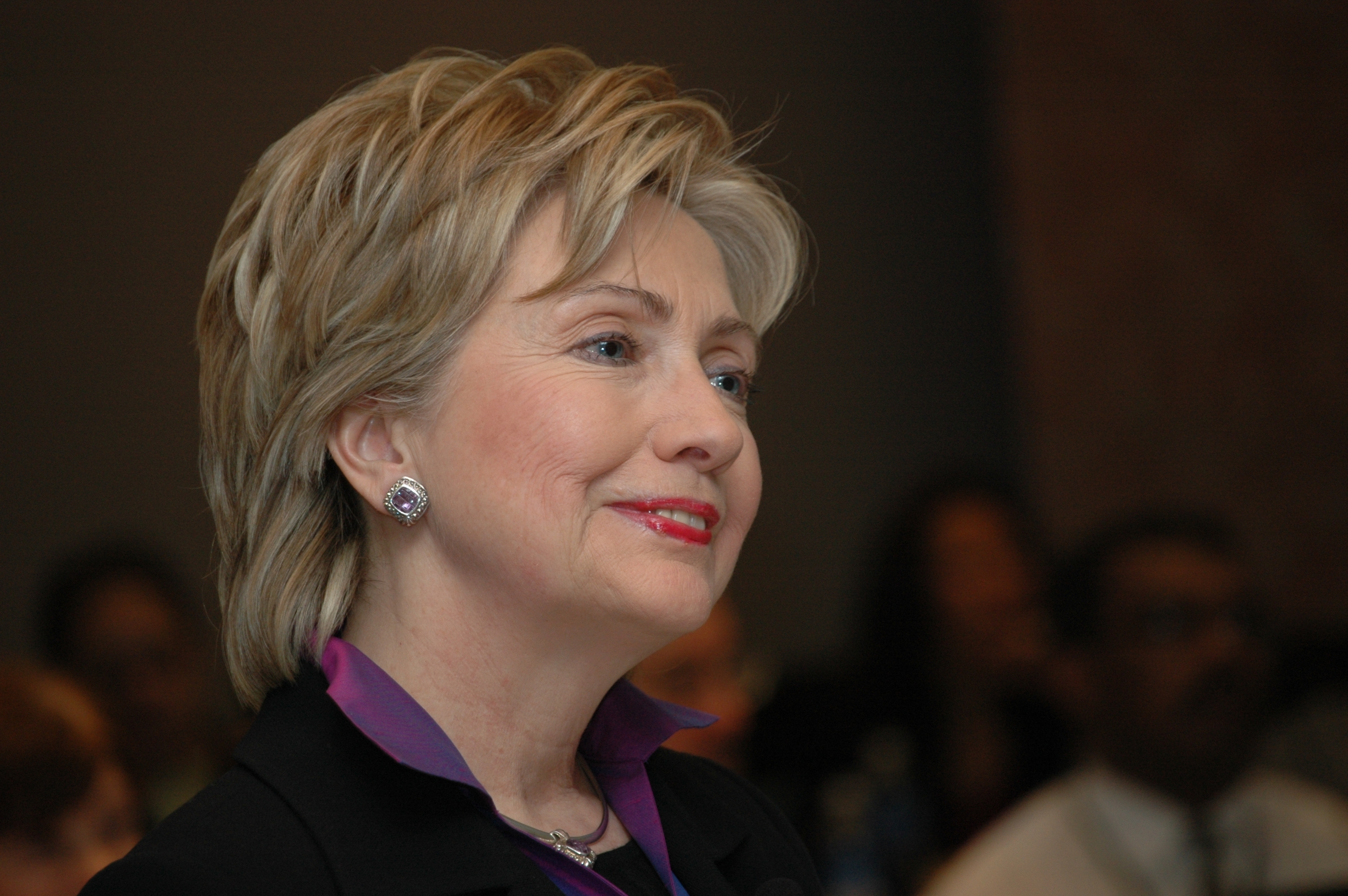
Clinton at Gallaudet University for the SEIU union forum in late January 2007

In February 2007, the Los Angeles Times reported that several anti-Clinton organizations, including Stop Her Now and Stop Hillary PAC, were preparing "swiftboating" style attacks against her, with venues to include a documentary film, numerous books, and websites. A top Rudy Giuliani donor, Richard Collins, who has also supported George W. Bush for several years, was central in establishing "Stop Her Now."

CNN reported that 320,000 users joined the Facebook group "Stop Hillary Clinton: (One Million Strong AGAINST Hillary)". The news blog, Politico gave the membership number as 418,000 members. This group was the largest group for or against a presidential candidate on Facebook; The Politico argued that this happened because "Clinton has had a polarizing effect."

Former Bill Clinton fundraiser and ally David Geffen spoke out against Hillary Clinton in an interview with Maureen Dowd. Geffen stated that Clinton "was overproduced and overscripted." He also stated that, "I don't think anybody believes that in the last six years, all of a sudden Bill Clinton has become a different person [...] Everybody in politics lies, but they do it with such ease, it's troubling." The Clinton campaign responded by stating, "While Senator Obama was denouncing slash and burn politics yesterday, his campaign's finance chair was viciously and personally attacking Senator Clinton and her husband. If Senator Obama is indeed sincere about his repeated claims to change the tone of our politics, he should immediately denounce these remarks, remove Mr. Geffen from his campaign and return his money. While Democrats should engage in a vigorous debate on the issues, there is no place in our party or our politics for the kind of personal insults made by Senator Obama's principal fundraiser."

== Accent ==
While speaking from the pulpit of the First Baptist Church in Selma, Alabama, on March 4, 2007, as part of ceremonies honoring the anniversary of the Selma to Montgomery marches of 1965, Clinton used a broad Southern Drawl during parts of her talk and used speech patterns common to the Southern United States. A Clinton aide pointed out she lived in the Southern United States for 17 years, which could explain the southern accent, and other defenders of Clinton pointed out that the most commonly circulated audio and video clips of her "Southern" speech focused on a segment in which she was reciting the lyrics of a James Cleveland hymn and trying to reproduce its original cadences. On April 20, 2007, while speaking her own words to the annual convention of the National Action Network, she once again temporarily adopted this accent. On April 27, 2007, while speaking at a campaign event in Greenville, South Carolina, Clinton said that she had split her life among three parts of the country and that her sometimes-Southern accent was a virtue. She joked, "I think America is ready for a multilingual president."

== Discussion of Iraq War (first debate) ==
On April 26, 2007, she appeared with seven other Democratic candidates at the first debate of the campaign, held at South Carolina State University in Orangeburg, South Carolina, and broadcast on MSNBC. Of her initial Senate vote to approve the U.S. role in the Iraq War, she stated, "If I knew then what I know now, I would not have voted that way." She further stated, "If this president does not get us out of Iraq, when I'm president I will."

== Threat ==
On May 4, 2007, a Louisiana State University student was arrested and held on charges of planning an attack against Clinton during a Baton Rouge appearance.

== Polling trends ==
All opinion polls in April 2007 showed Clinton as the Democratic frontrunner, however with different margins: Obama was listed in third place nationwide with 17% and John Edwards in second place with 19% behind Clinton with 41% according to an Angus-Reid poll, whereas Clinton was listed in first place with 34% and Obama in second place with 29%, ahead of Edwards with only 15% in a Rasmussen-Reports poll. By May 2007, polls were showing the race even tighter, with Rasmussen Reports showing Obama pulling ahead of Clinton 32% to 30%. But on May 24, 2007, a CBS News/NY Times poll showed Clinton, with 46%, 22 points ahead of Obama, with 24%, and 32 points ahead of Edwards, with 14%. Clinton held her lead over the summer; in September a CNN poll showed her leading Obama 46% to 23%, and in October the same poll showed her commanding majority Democratic support, with 51% compared to Obama's 21% and Edwards' 15%.

On May 4, 2007, a Gallup Poll report showed that since the beginning of the year, her favorable-unfavorable ratio had declined from 58% favorable, 40% unfavorable to 45% favorable, 52% unfavorable.

== Campaign song ==
In June 2007, Clinton spoofed the much-talked-about closing scene of "Made in America", the series finale of The Sopranos, with the subject being the voting for her campaign song. The parody shows her entering a diner to Journey's "Don't Stop Believin'", followed by Bill entering but not getting the onion rings he really wants, while daughter Chelsea is unable to parallel park her car. Sopranos cast member Vince Curatola also appears in the skit, mimicking "Man in Members Only" but with his signature Johnny Sack malevolent glare. The screen then goes black.

The campaign song selected was Céline Dion's "You and I", which garnered political criticism from Republicans for being "outsourced" to a Canadian singer; the song was written initially for use in an Air Canada commercial.

== Viral videos ==
Besides the Sopranos spoof, other popular viral videos played a role in the campaign. In March 2007, "Hillary 1984" spliced footage of Clinton into the legendary "1984" Apple Computer television commercial, ending with a plug for Barack Obama's candidacy. In June 2007 Obama was the beneficiary of the very popular "I Got a Crush on Obama" music video, as an attractive young woman suggestively sang his praises. In July 2007 singer and actress Taryn Southern wrote and performed in an answer music video, "Hott4Hill", that earned national media attention for its sexually ambiguous declaration of support for Hillary Clinton's presidential bid. In both cases, the videos were created and produced independently of the Obama and Clinton campaigns. In December 2007 satirical site 23/6 produced two videos "against" Clinton by a purported "SwiftKids for Truth" that made fun of viral videos and negative ads in general. In January 2008, the Clinton campaign disseminated a video targeting the 18- to 29-year-old demographic in hopes of attracting voters away from Obama. According to a Newsweek blogger, Andrew Romano, the ad was created by actual young supporters instead of high-paid media consultants.

== First campaign trip with Bill ==
In early July 2007, Bill Clinton "served as an opening act" for Hillary during a three-day tour. It was the "first joint public campaign appearance for the couple since Hillary Clinton announced her bid for the White House in January."

== Later debates ==
Following the July 12, 2007, Democratic candidates debate at an NAACP convention, a live microphone caught Clinton discussing in private with third-in-the-polls fellow candidate John Edwards how to get future debates limited to fewer candidates: "We've got to cut the number . . . They're not serious."

== Release of First Lady records ==
In July 2007, watchdog group Judicial Watch sued the National Archives over the slow release of documents covering her career as First Lady. Almost 2 million pages of documents held at the Clinton Library had yet to be released from those years, with less than 1 percent having been released. Federal archivists stated that the process is slow due to the need to perform redactions due to the law, and likely would extend past the 2008 presidential election. Clinton had said at the time of the library's opening in 2004 that "everything's going to be available." Political consultants said that the unreleased documents might be a rich source for opposition research against Clinton.

This issue intensified with the October 30, 2007, Democratic debate at Drexel University, where Hillary Clinton came under fire about it from MSNBC moderator Tim Russert and from Democratic opponents. Russert displayed a document signed by President Clinton that specifically requested that certain records and communications involving her not be made public until 2012. When Russert asked Hillary Clinton whether she would lift the presidential order, Hillary Clinton responded by saying, "That's not my decision to make." A concurrent Newsweek investigation stated that Bill Clinton had requested the archivists hold back a large variety of documents. A few days later, Bill Clinton vigorously defended his wife's responses, saying that Russert's question was "breathtakingly misleading" and that Newsweek's article was off the mark, saying, "She was incidental to the letter, it was done five years ago, it was a letter to speed up presidential releases, not to slow them down." Factcheck.org subsequently concluded that Russert's claim was incorrect, that Bill Clinton had released White House records earlier and in greater numbers than his two immediate predecessors, and that there was not much Hillary Clinton could do to speed up the release of records involving her.
However, on March 6, 2008, Federal archivists at the Clinton Presidential Library blocked the release of hundreds of pages of White House papers on pardons that the former president approved, including clemency for fugitive commodities trader Marc Rich, based on guidance provided by Bill Clinton.

== Fears of backlash ==
An August 12, 2007, article described concerns that a Clinton candidacy could lead to a backlash due to fears that she might prove "polarizing." The article states, "A strategist with close ties to leaders in Congress said Democratic Senate candidates in competitive races would be strongly urged to distance themselves from Clinton." According to an online poll, "half of likely voters nationwide said they would never vote for New York Sen. Hillary Clinton."

An October 10, 2007, article in The Hill made the opposite argument stating that Clinton was "not polarizing and highly electable. You didn't misread that headline. It is contrary to all current conventional wisdom. It is also true – supported not only by recent national polling data but by most polls all year long. Susan Estrich, on p.66 of her 2005 book, The Case for Hillary Clinton argues, "Hillary Clinton is not polarizing; her competence is accepted."

== Unveiling of health care plan ==
On September 17, 2007, Clinton revealed her new American Health Choices Plan, an "individual mandate" universal health care plan that would require health care coverage for all individuals. Clinton explained individuals can keep their current employer-based coverage, or choose an expanded version of Medicare or federal employee health plans. The projected cost of the plan is $110 billion annually and will require all employers to cover their employees' health insurance or contribute to the costs of their employees' health insurance coverage; tax credits will be provided to companies with fewer than 25 employees to help cover costs. She proposed to pay for the plan by cutting government medical costs and by not extending the Bush tax cuts to those making over $250,000 a year.

Clinton emphasized that this was not a reprise of the failed 1993 Clinton health care plan, saying it reflected her experiences and now involved no new government bureaucracy, but Republican opponents disagreed and immediately dubbed it "Hillarycare 2.0". However, many of the health care industry groups that had opposed and funded attacks upon the 1993 plan, were now contributors to Clinton campaigns. Meanwhile, Elizabeth Edwards, wife of fellow Democratic candidate John Edwards, said it was too imitative of Edwards' plan, which had come out seven months earlier.

== $5,000 for every baby ==
In September 2007, Clinton suggested that every newborn baby receive $5,000 upon reaching their 18th birthday. Clinton said that with this money, "they will be able to access it to go to college or maybe they will be able to make that downpayment on their first home". In October 2007, Clinton withdrew this proposal and according to USA Today stated that "it was just an idea and not a policy proposal".

== Advertisement on care for 9/11 workers ==
On October 4, 2007, Clinton's campaign began airing television advertisements in Iowa and New Hampshire. The advertisement dealt with Clinton's legislative efforts to address the Ground Zero illness issues of clean-up workers at "the Pile" site of the former World Trade Center. The ad, filmed in black-and-white, shows an earnest-looking Clinton wearing a paper mask. The voiceover says, "She stood by Ground Zero workers who sacrificed their health after so many sacrificed their lives, and kept standing 'til the administration took action." The ad referred to Clinton's Congressional effort to secure additional funding and medical care for workers who have suffered Ground Zero illnesses, such as cancer and sarcoidosis.

== Debate performance in Philadelphia ==
During the course of the 2007 Democratic debates Clinton had established a reputation, even amongst her ideological opponents such as Rich Lowry, as a very solid debater who never made mistakes. However, at the October 30, 2007, MSNBC Democratic debate at Drexel University in Philadelphia, Clinton was the subject of two hours of near-continuous attacks from her Democratic rivals as well as pointed questioning from moderator Tim Russert. This was not unexpected, as leading up to the debate, Clinton had assumed a wide lead in many polls, rival Barack Obama had indicated that he was now going to be more aggressive in pointing out differences between himself and Clinton, and another leading rival John Edwards had also been increasing his statements against Clinton. Adam Nagourney of The New York Times called it "the most eagerly anticipated forum of this year."

In the debate, Clinton suffered her possible first major campaign setback when she engaged in what reporters for The Washington Post termed "a rare night of fumbles," including statements that Jake Tapper of ABC News termed "obfuscatory and less than forthright," making for what Roger Simon of Politico called "the worst performance of her entire campaign" in which "for two hours she dodged and weaved, parsed and stonewalled." Clinton refused to commit to a position on Social Security, Illegal Immigration, the war in Iraq and the New York Governor Eliot Spitzer's bill to deliver driver's licenses to illegal immigrants. Her response on the last issue brought the most criticism, with opponent Senator Christopher Dodd and Edwards immediately saying she had contradicted herself, an assessment echoed by Margaret Carlson of Bloomberg News, who wrote that "In the course of two minutes, she gave two different answers while trying to give none at all."

Clinton's own supporters conceded that her performance had not been very good. The following day, however, the Clinton campaign assembled and released a short video entitled "The Politics of Pile On", which showed her debate opponents mentioning her by name over and over. Furthermore, during a November 1 speech at her alma mater Wellesley College, she said that "In so many ways, this all-women's college prepared me to compete in the all-boys' club of presidential politics." This, combined with comments made by some supporters, including remarks by Clinton campaign manager Mark Penn against moderator Russert, led pundits to believe she was playing the "gender card". This in turn led to another round of criticism of Clinton, who had previously stressed her toughness as being one of her strengths as a potential president; Obama pointed out that he had never complained that attacks on him were due to his being African-American. On November 2, Clinton issued a clarification, stating "I don't think they're picking on me because I'm a woman, I think they're picking on me because I'm winning.". Meanwhile, the Edwards campaign assembled and released a video of Clinton's contradictory debate remarks entitled "The Politics of Parsing", which Daily Kos termed "devastating". A CNN/Opinion Research Corporation national poll in the wake of the debate and its attendant publicity found Clinton with a reduced but still substantial lead over Obama and Edwards, while an NBC/Wall Street Journal national poll found her lead to be unaffected; a WNBC-TV/Marist poll found her lead slipping in first primary state New Hampshire. A week after the debate, Clinton said, "I wasn't at my best the other night. We've had a bunch of debates and I wouldn't rank that up in my very top list," but defended her desire to give nuanced responses to questions and reiterated that gender was not an issue in terms of being subjected to political attacks.

== Prompted Queries ==
On November 12, 2007, The New York Times reported that "At two campaign events in Iowa this year, aides to Senator Hillary Rodham Clinton encouraged audience members to ask her specific questions, a tactic that drew criticism from an opponent for the Democratic presidential nomination and led her yesterday to promise that it would not happen again." In response, Clinton remarked, 'It was news to me [...] and neither I nor my campaign approve of that, and it will certainly not be tolerated.'"

== Las Vegas debate ==
At the next Democratic debate at University of Nevada, Las Vegas, on November 15, Clinton rebounded to previous form, aggressively combating Obama's and Edwards' attacks. Democratic strategist Garry South said, "To the degree she might have been stumbling in the last debate, she regained her footing tonight," while ABC News said, "After her roughest two weeks on the presidential campaign trail, [Clinton] showed up on a debate stage in Las Vegas ... with a new aggressive game plan and appeared to successfully get her campaign ship back on course." Her answer to the previously troublesome question of supporting driver's licenses for illegal immigrants was now given in one word: "No."

== New Hampshire campaign office hostage-taking ==
On November 30, 2007, a man identified as 47-year-old Leeland Eisenberg, armed with road flares strapped to his chest which he claimed were a bomb, entered a Clinton presidential campaign office in Rochester, New Hampshire. He took hostage the six people in it, and requested to speak to Clinton, believing she could assist him in gaining psychiatric help. Two hostages were released early on, a woman and her infant. Two subsequent hostages were released by Eisenberg during the first 90 minutes of the crisis and the final two Clinton staffers managed to escape the building on their own accord after more than five hours of being held against their will. The standoff ended with Eisenberg's surrender about six hours after the incident began.

At the time of the event, Clinton was in the Washington D.C. area, scheduled to speak at a Democratic National Committee meeting in Vienna, Virginia; she canceled her appearances at public events for the remainder of the day. That evening she flew to Rochester in order to meet with and comfort the hostages, and praised the law enforcement officials who handled the situation, and vow not to change her campaign style due to the incident.

== December 2007: A tightening contest ==
By early December 2007, the race between her and Obama had tightened up, especially in the early caucus and primary states of Iowa, New Hampshire, and South Carolina. With real voting less than a month away, Clinton brought into Iowa her daughter Chelsea and a very rare campaign appearance from her 88-year-old mother Dorothy Rodham. Veteran political observers such as Bloomberg News' Al Hunt reported that "things are tense in Hillaryland these days," that the camps of Clinton and her husband were at odds, and that the campaign's "plan A" of being the dominating, inevitable, establishment candidate was at risk of failing.

On December 13, 2007, Bill Shaheen, co-chairman of the Clinton campaign in New Hampshire, resigned his position after saying that Obama's admission of past drug use would hurt his chances in a general election matchup: "The Republicans are not going to give up without a fight ... and one of the things they're certainly going to jump on is his drug use ... It'll be, 'When was the last time? Did you ever give drugs to anyone? Did you sell them to anyone?' There are so many openings for Republican dirty tricks. It's hard to overcome." Shaheen, husband of former Governor of New Hampshire Jeanne Shaheen, apologized for his comments. In addition he indicated that "they were not authorized by the campaign in any way." The final Democratic debate before the caucuses was held the same day by The Des Moines Register; it was peaceful and polite among all candidates there.

The two most influential newspaper endorsements for the early states were split: Clinton gain the endorsement of The Des Moines Register, which had endorsed Edwards in 2004, while Obama gained the endorsement of the circulated-in-New Hampshire Boston Globe. Bill Clinton assumed a more central role in his wife's campaign, trying to focus the day-to-day message on her being a "change" agent, while sometimes getting her campaign into further difficulties with his public statements.

By mid-month, prompted by continued high negative ratings in polls, Clinton staged an explicit "likability" drive, using testimonials from friends and constituents on the campaign trail and on a new "The Hillary I Know" website. When the close proximity of the first contests to the holidays led to many candidates putting out Christmas videos – allowing them to keep presenting their message but in a more appropriate setting — Clinton chose one that showed her wrapping various "gifts" she would give the country, such as "universal health care" and "bring troops home", with a bit of humor added when she momentarily could not locate "universal pre-K". It was one of the most issue-oriented of the candidate holiday videos.
