= 2008 United States presidential election in Washington =

2008 United States presidential election in Washington may refer to:

- 2008 United States presidential election in Washington (state)
- 2008 United States presidential election in Washington, D.C.
