= January–August 2016 statewide opinion polling for the 2016 United States presidential election =

Statewide polls for the 2016 United States presidential election are as follows. The polls listed here, by state, are from January 1 to August 31, 2016, and provide early data on opinion polling between a possible Republican candidate against a possible Democratic candidate.

Note some states had not conducted polling yet or no updated polls were present from January 1 to August 31, 2016.

== Alabama ==
9 electoral votes
(Republican in 2008) 60%–39%
(Republican in 2012) 61%–38%

Poll source	Date administered	Democrat	%	Republican	%	Lead margin	Sample size	Margin of error
News-5/Strategy Poll	July 19, 2016	Hillary Clinton	33%	Donald Trump	57%	24	4,100	± 2.0%

== Alaska ==
3 electoral votes
(Republican in 2008) 59%–38%
(Republican in 2012) 55%–41%

Poll source	Date administered	Democrat	%	Republican	%	Lead margin	Sample size	Margin of error
Ivan Moore Research	June 16–20, 2016	Hillary Clinton	41%	Donald Trump	45%	4	670	?
Alaska Dispatch News/Ivan Moore Research	January 2016	Hillary Clinton	44.1%	Donald Trump	49.3%	5.2	651	?
Alaska Dispatch News/Ivan Moore Research	January 2016	Hillary Clinton	37.5%	Ted Cruz	56.9%	19.4	651	?
Alaska Dispatch News/Ivan Moore Research	January 2016	Hillary Clinton	37.9%	Marco Rubio	56.7%	18.8	651	?

Four-way race

Poll source	Date administered	Democrat	%	Republican	%	Libertarian	%	Green Party	%	Lead margin	Sample size	Margin of error
Moore Information	August 27–29, 2016	Hillary Clinton	29%	Donald Trump	39%	Gary Johnson	10%	Jill Stein	4%	10	500	± 4%
Ivan Moore Research	June 16–20, 2016	Hillary Clinton	30%	Donald Trump	39%	Gary Johnson	16%	Jill Stein	6%	9	670	?

== Arizona ==
11 electoral votes
(Republican in 2008) 53%–45%
(Republican in 2012) 53%–44%

Poll source	Date administered	Democrat	%	Republican	%	Lead margin	Sample size	Margin of error
Public Policy Polling	August 26–28, 2016	Hillary Clinton	43%	Donald Trump	46%	3	837	± 3.4%
CNN/ORC	August 18–23, 2016	Hillary Clinton	44%	Donald Trump	49%	5	809	± 3.5%
Public Policy Polling	June 22–23, 2016	Hillary Clinton	40%	Donald Trump	44%	4	691	± 3.7%
OH Predictive Insights	June 20, 2016	Hillary Clinton	47%	Donald Trump	42%	5	1,060	± 3.01%
Greenberg Quinlan Rosner	June 11–20, 2016	Hillary Clinton	39%	Donald Trump	45%	6	300	± 5.66%
Public Policy Polling	May 13–15, 2016	Hillary Clinton	41%	Donald Trump	45%	4	896	± 3.3%
Public Policy Polling	May 13–15, 2016	Bernie Sanders	45%	Donald Trump	44%	1	896	± 3.3%
Behavior Research Center	April 4–11, 2016	Hillary Clinton	42%	Donald Trump	35%	7	564	± 4.2%
Behavior Research Center	April 4–11, 2016	Hillary Clinton	38%	Ted Cruz	43%	5	564	± 4.2%
Behavior Research Center	April 4–11, 2016	Hillary Clinton	32%	John Kasich	44%	12	564	± 4.2%
Behavior Research Center	April 4–11, 2016	Bernie Sanders	54%	Donald Trump	33%	21	564	± 4.2%
Behavior Research Center	April 4–11, 2016	Bernie Sanders	48%	Ted Cruz	34%	14	564	± 4.2%
Behavior Research Center	April 4–11, 2016	Bernie Sanders	47%	John Kasich	33%	14	564	± 4.2%
Merrill Poll/WestGroup	March 7–11, 2016	Hillary Clinton	38%	Donald Trump	38%	Tied	701	± 3.7%
Merrill Poll/WestGroup	March 7–11, 2016	Hillary Clinton	35%	Ted Cruz	41%	6	701	± 3.7%
Merrill Poll/WestGroup	March 7–11, 2016	Bernie Sanders	39%	Donald Trump	36%	3	701	± 3.7%

Four-way race

Poll source	Date administered	Democrat	%	Republican	%	Libertarian	%	Green	%	Lead margin	Sample size	Margin of error
Arizona Republic/Morrison/Cronkite News	August 17–31, 2016	Hillary Clinton	35%	Donald Trump	34%	Gary Johnson	7%	Jill Stein	2%	1	704	± 3.3%
OH Predictive Insights	August 25–27, 2016	Hillary Clinton	40%	Donald Trump	39%	Gary Johnson	7%	Jill Stein	1%	1	728	±3.63%
CNN/ORC	August 18–23, 2016	Hillary Clinton	38%	Donald Trump	45%	Gary Johnson	12%	Jill Stein	4%	7	809	± 3.5%
CBS News/YouGov	August 2–5, 2016	Hillary Clinton	42%	Donald Trump	44%	Gary Johnson	5%	Jill Stein	2%	2	1,095	± 4.8%
OH Predictive Insights	August 1, 2016	Hillary Clinton	45%	Donald Trump	43%	Gary Johnson	4%	Jill Stein	1%	2	996	±3.0%
Integrated Web Strategy	July 29, 2016	Hillary Clinton	41%	Donald Trump	49%	Gary Johnson	3%	Jill Stein	1%	8	679	± 3.76%
Public Policy Polling	May 13–15, 2016	Hillary Clinton	38%	Donald Trump	40%	Gary Johnson	6%	Jill Stein	2%	2	896	± 3.3%
Public Policy Polling	May 13–15, 2016	Bernie Sanders	42%	Donald Trump	39%	Gary Johnson	6%	Jill Stein	2%	3	896	± 3.3%

== Arkansas ==
6 electoral votes
(Republican in 2008) 59%–39%
(Republican in 2012) 61%–37%

Three-way race

Poll source	Date administered	Democrat	%	Republican	%	Independent/ Third-party candidate	%	Lead margin	Sample size	Margin of error
Talk Business/Hendrix College	June 21, 2016	Hillary Clinton	36%	Donald Trump	47%	Gary Johnson	8%	11	751	± 3.6%

== California ==
55 electoral votes
(Democratic in 2008) 61%–37%
(Democratic in 2012) 60%–37%

Poll source	Date administered	Democrat	%	Republican	%	Lead margin	Sample size	Margin of error
Field Research	June 8 – July 2, 2016	Hillary Clinton	58%	Donald Trump	28%	30	956	± 3.2%
SurveyMonkey/USC/Los Angeles Times	June 7–10, 2016	Hillary Clinton	59%	Donald Trump	32%	27	1,553	± 3%
CBS News/YouGov	May 31 – June 3, 2016	Hillary Clinton	48%	Donald Trump	33%	15	1,187	± 3.9%
CBS News/YouGov	May 31 – June 3, 2016	Bernie Sanders	55%	Donald Trump	32%	23	1,187	± 3.9%
USC/Los Angeles Times	May 19–31, 2016	Hillary Clinton	56%	Donald Trump	30%	26	1,500	± 2.9%
NBC News/Wall Street Journal/Marist College	May 29–31, 2016	Hillary Clinton	55%	Donald Trump	31%	24	1,833	± 2.3%
NBC News/Wall Street Journal/Marist College	May 29–31, 2016	Bernie Sanders	62%	Donald Trump	28%	34	1,833	± 2.3%
Field Research	May 26–31, 2016	Hillary Clinton	53%	Donald Trump	34%	19	1,002	± 3.2%
Field Research	May 26–31, 2016	Bernie Sanders	60%	Donald Trump	31%	29	1,002	± 3.2%
SurveyUSA/KABC/SCNG	May 19–22, 2016	Hillary Clinton	52%	Donald Trump	38%	14	1,383	± 2.7%
Public Policy Institute of California	May 13–22, 2016	Hillary Clinton	49%	Donald Trump	39%	10	1,704	± 4.3%
Public Policy Institute of California	May 13–22, 2016	Bernie Sanders	53%	Donald Trump	36%	17	1,704	± 4.3%
SurveyUSA/KABC/SCNG	April 27–30, 2016	Hillary Clinton	56%	Donald Trump	34%	22	1,683	± 2.4%
SurveyUSA/KABC/SCNG	April 27–30, 2016	Hillary Clinton	57%	Ted Cruz	29%	28	1,683	± 2.4%
SurveyUSA/KABC/SCNG	April 27–30, 2016	Hillary Clinton	53%	John Kasich	34%	19	1,683	± 2.4%
SurveyUSA	March 30 – April 3, 2016	Hillary Clinton	60%	Donald Trump	26%	34	1,507	± 2.6%
SurveyUSA	March 30 – April 3, 2016	Hillary Clinton	57%	Ted Cruz	32%	25	1,507	± 2.6%
SurveyUSA	March 30 – April 3, 2016	Hillary Clinton	56%	John Kasich	33%	23	1,507	± 2.6%
SurveyUSA	March 30 – April 3, 2016	Bernie Sanders	63%	Donald Trump	24%	39	1,507	± 2.6%
SurveyUSA	March 30 – April 3, 2016	Bernie Sanders	61%	Ted Cruz	26%	35	1,507	± 2.6%
SurveyUSA	March 30 – April 3, 2016	Bernie Sanders	57%	John Kasich	28%	29	1,507	± 2.6%
Field Research	March 24 – April 4, 2016	Hillary Clinton	59%	Donald Trump	31%	28	1,400	± 3.2%
Field Research	March 24 – April 4, 2016	Hillary Clinton	55%	Ted Cruz	32%	23	1,400	± 3.2%
USC Dornsife College/LA Times	March 16–23, 2016	Hillary Clinton	59%	Donald Trump	28%	31	1,503	± %
USC Dornsife College/LA Times	March 16–23, 2016	Hillary Clinton	59%	Ted Cruz	31%	28	1,503	± %
USC Dornsife College/LA Times	March 16–23, 2016	Hillary Clinton	54%	John Kasich	35%	19	1,503	± %

Three-way race

Poll source	Date administered	Democrat	%	Republican	%	Independent/ Third-party candidate	%	Lead margin	Sample size	Margin of error
Field Research	June 8 – July 2, 2016	Hillary Clinton	50%	Donald Trump	26%	Gary Johnson	10%	24	495	± 4.4%
Hoover Institution/YouGov	May 4–16, 2016	Hillary Clinton	45%	Donald Trump	33%	Gary Johnson	4%	12	1,196	± 3.97%

Four-way race

Poll source	Date administered	Democrat	%	Republican	%	Libertarian	%	Green	%	Lead margin	Sample size	Margin of error
Public Policy Institute of California	July 10–19, 2016	Hillary Clinton	46%	Donald Trump	30%	Gary Johnson	7%	Jill Stein	6%	16	1,703	± 3.5%
SurveyMonkey/USC/Los Angeles Times	June 7–10, 2016	Hillary Clinton	51%	Donald Trump	27%	Gary Johnson	7%	Jill Stein	6%	24	1,553	± 3%

== Colorado ==
9 electoral votes
(Democratic in 2008) 54%–45%
(Democratic in 2012) 51%–46%

Two-way race

Poll source	Date administered	Democrat	%	Republican	%	Lead margin	Sample size	Margin of error
Quinnipiac University	August 9–16, 2016	Hillary Clinton	49%	Donald Trump	39%	10	830	± 3.4%
NBC News/Wall Street Journal/Marist	August 4–10, 2016	Hillary Clinton	46%	Donald Trump	32%	14	899	± 3.3%
Fox News	July 9–12, 2016	Hillary Clinton	44%	Donald Trump	34%	10	600	± 4%
NBC News/Wall Street Journal/Marist	July 5–11, 2016	Hillary Clinton	43%	Donald Trump	35%	8	794	± 3.5%
Harper	July 7–9, 2016	Hillary Clinton	45%	Donald Trump	38%	7	500	± 4.38%
Gravis Marketing	July 7–8, 2016	Hillary Clinton	43%	Donald Trump	41%	2	1,313	± 2.7%

Four-way race

Poll source	Date administered	Democrat	%	Republican	%	Libertarian	%	Green	%	Lead margin	Sample size	Margin of error
Magellan Strategies	August 29–31, 2016	Hillary Clinton	41%	Donald Trump	36%	Gary Johnson	13%	Jill Stein	3%	5	500	± 4.38%
Quinnipiac University	August 9–16, 2016	Hillary Clinton	41%	Donald Trump	33%	Gary Johnson	16%	Jill Stein	7%	8	830	± 3.4%
NBC News/Wall Street Journal/Marist	August 4–10, 2016	Hillary Clinton	41%	Donald Trump	29%	Gary Johnson	15%	Jill Stein	6%	12	899	± 3.3%
Fox News	July 9–12, 2016	Hillary Clinton	37%	Donald Trump	28%	Gary Johnson	13%	Jill Stein	6%	9	600	± 4%
Monmouth University	July 7–12, 2016	Hillary Clinton	48%	Donald Trump	35%	Gary Johnson	5%	Jill Stein	3%	13	404	± 4.9%
NBC News/Wall Street Journal/Marist	July 5–11, 2016	Hillary Clinton	39%	Donald Trump	33%	Gary Johnson	13%	Jill Stein	4%	6	794	± 3.5%
Gravis Marketing	July 7–8, 2016	Hillary Clinton	39%	Donald Trump	38%	Gary Johnson	9%	Jill Stein	4%	1	1,313	± 2.7%
CBS News/YouGov	June 21–24, 2016	Hillary Clinton	40%	Donald Trump	39%	Gary Johnson	4%	Jill Stein	1%	1	996	± 4.3%

== Connecticut ==
7 electoral votes
(Democratic in 2008) 61%–38%
(Democratic in 2012) 58%–41%

Poll source	Date administered	Democrat	%	Republican	%	Lead margin	Sample size	Margin of error
Quinnipiac University	June 1–5, 2016	Hillary Clinton	45%	Donald Trump	38%	7	1,330	± 2.7%
Quinnipiac University	June 1–5, 2016	Bernie Sanders	54%	Donald Trump	35%	19	1,330	± 2.7%
Emerson College	April 10–11, 2016	Hillary Clinton	48%	Donald Trump	40%	8	1,043	± 3%
Emerson College	April 10–11, 2016	Hillary Clinton	52%	Ted Cruz	31%	21	1,043	± 3%
Emerson College	April 10–11, 2016	Hillary Clinton	38%	John Kasich	49%	11	1,043	± 3%
Emerson College	April 10–11, 2016	Bernie Sanders	49%	Donald Trump	40%	9	1,043	± 3%
Emerson College	April 10–11, 2016	Bernie Sanders	55%	Ted Cruz	30%	25	1,043	± 3%
Emerson College	April 10–11, 2016	Bernie Sanders	40%	John Kasich	48%	8	1,043	± 3%

Four-way race

Poll source	Date administered	Democrat	%	Republican	%	Libertarian	%	Green	%	Lead margin	Sample size	Margin of error
Quinnipiac University	June 1–5, 2016	Hillary Clinton	41%	Donald Trump	36%	Gary Johnson	6%	Jill Stein	3%	5	1,330	± 2.7%

== Delaware ==
3 electoral votes
(Democratic in 2008) 62%–37%
(Democratic in 2012) 59%–40%

Three-way race

Poll source	Date administered	Democrat	%	Republican	%	Libertarian	%	Lead margin	Sample size	Margin of error
Fairleigh Dickinson University	July 20–24, 2016	Hillary Clinton	42%	Donald Trump	32%	Gary Johnson	9%	10	715	± 4.1%

== District of Columbia ==
3 electoral votes
(Democratic in 2008) 92%–7%
(Democratic in 2012) 91%–7%

No polling was conducted in 2016

== Florida ==
29 electoral votes
(Democratic in 2008) 51%–48%
(Democratic in 2012) 50%–49%

== Georgia ==
16 electoral votes
(Republican in 2008) 52%–47%
(Republican in 2012) 53%–45%

Poll source	Date administered	Democrat	%	Republican	%	Lead margin	Sample size	Margin of error
Atlanta Journal-Constitution	August 1–4, 2016	Hillary Clinton	44%	Donald Trump	40%	4	847	± 4.0%
Public Policy Polling	May 27–30, 2016	Hillary Clinton	40%	Donald Trump	49%	9	724	± 3.6%
Public Policy Polling	May 27–30, 2016	Bernie Sanders	40%	Donald Trump	48%	8	724	± 3.6%
Fox 5/Opinion Savvy	May 15, 2016	Hillary Clinton	41%	Donald Trump	44%	3	587	± 4.0%
Atlanta Journal-Constitution	May 9–12, 2016	Hillary Clinton	41%	Donald Trump	45%	4	822	± 4.26%
Atlanta Journal-Constitution	May 9–12, 2016	Bernie Sanders	47%	Donald Trump	42%	5	822	± 4.26%
Landmark/RosettaStone	May 5, 2016	Hillary Clinton	41%	Donald Trump	42%	1	570	± 4.1%
Lake Research Partners	March 31 – April 3, 2016	Hillary Clinton	50%	Donald Trump	37%	13	400	± 4.9%
Lake Research Partners	March 31 – April 3, 2016	Hillary Clinton	47%	Ted Cruz	40%	7	400	± 4.9%
SurveyUSA	February 22–23, 2016	Hillary Clinton	41%	Donald Trump	50%	9	1,261	± 2.8%
SurveyUSA	February 22–23, 2016	Hillary Clinton	43%	Marco Rubio	50%	7	1,261	± 2.8%
SurveyUSA	February 22–23, 2016	Hillary Clinton	42%	Ted Cruz	49%	7	1,261	± 2.8%
SurveyUSA	February 22–23, 2016	Bernie Sanders	41%	Donald Trump	49%	8	1,261	± 2.8%
SurveyUSA	February 22–23, 2016	Bernie Sanders	41%	Marco Rubio	49%	8	1,261	± 2.8%
SurveyUSA	February 22–23, 2016	Bernie Sanders	42%	Ted Cruz	48%	6	1,261	± 2.8%

Three-way race

Poll source	Date administered	Democrat	%	Republican	%	Libertarian	%	Lead margin	Sample size	Margin of error
Opinion Savvy/Fox 5 Atlanta	August 17, 2016	Hillary Clinton	43%	Donald Trump	43%	Gary Johnson	11%	Tied	730	± 3.6%

Four-way race

Poll source	Date administered	Democrat	%	Republican	%	Libertarian	%	Green	%	Lead margin	Sample size	Margin of error
CBS News/YouGov	August 10–12, 2016	Hillary Clinton	41%	Donald Trump	45%	Gary Johnson	5%	Jill Stein	1%	4	988	± 4.3%
JMC Analytics	August 6–7, 2016	Hillary Clinton	44%	Donald Trump	37%	Gary Johnson	7%	Jill Stein	1%	7	615	± 4.0%
Atlanta Journal-Constitution	August 1–4, 2016	Hillary Clinton	41%	Donald Trump	38%	Gary Johnson	11%	Jill Stein	2%	3	847	± 4.0%
Landmark/RosettaStone	August 1, 2016	Hillary Clinton	46%	Donald Trump	46%	Gary Johnson	4%	Jill Stein	1%	Tied	787	± 3.5%
SurveyUSA	July 29–31, 2016	Hillary Clinton	42%	Donald Trump	46%	Gary Johnson	5%	Jill Stein	2%	4	628	± 4%
Landmark/RosettaStone	July 24, 2016	Hillary Clinton	44%	Donald Trump	46%	Gary Johnson	5%	Jill Stein	3%	2	500	± 4.4%
Public Policy Polling	May 27–30, 2016	Hillary Clinton	38%	Donald Trump	45%	Gary Johnson	6%	Jill Stein	2%	7	724	± 3.6%
Public Policy Polling	May 27–30, 2016	Bernie Sanders	36%	Donald Trump	46%	Gary Johnson	5%	Jill Stein	1%	10	724	± 3.6%

== Idaho ==
4 electoral votes
(Republican in 2008) 61%–36%
(Republican in 2012) 64%–32%

Poll source	Date administered	Democrat	%	Republican	%	Lead margin	Sample size	Margin of error
Dan Jones & Associates	May 18 – June 4, 2016	Hillary Clinton	32%	Donald Trump	49%	17	603	± 3.99%
Dan Jones & Associates	May 18 – June 4, 2016	Bernie Sanders	43%	Donald Trump	46%	3	603	± 3.99%

Four-way race

Poll source	Date administered	Democrat	%	Republican	%	Libertarian	%	Green Party	%	Lead margin	Sample size	Margin of error
Dan Jones & Associates	August 18–31, 2016	Hillary Clinton	23%	Donald Trump	44%	Gary Johnson	13%	Jill Stein	2%	21	602	± 4.0%
Dan Jones & Associates	July 5–16, 2016	Hillary Clinton	23%	Donald Trump	44%	Gary Johnson	5%	Jill Stein	3%	21	601	± 4.0%

== Illinois ==
20 electoral votes
(Democratic in 2008) 62%–37%
(Democratic in 2012) 58%–41%

Poll source	Date administered	Democrat	%	Republican	%	Lead margin	Sample size	Margin of error
Normington, Petts and Associates	August 1–4, 2016	Hillary Clinton	51%	Donald Trump	32%	19	800	± 3.5%
NBC News/WSJ/Marist	March 4–10, 2016	Hillary Clinton	57%	Donald Trump	32%	25	1,968	± 2.2%
NBC News/WSJ/Marist	March 4–10, 2016	Hillary Clinton	51%	Ted Cruz	40%	11	1,968	± 2.2%
NBC News/WSJ/Marist	March 4–10, 2016	Bernie Sanders	60%	Donald Trump	30%	30	1,968	± 2.2%
NBC News/WSJ/Marist	March 4–10, 2016	Bernie Sanders	55%	Ted Cruz	35%	20	1,968	± 2.2%

Three-way race

Poll source	Date administered	Democrat	%	Republican	%	Independent/ Third-party candidate	%	Lead margin	Sample size	Margin of error
The Illinois Observer	June 7, 2016	Hillary Clinton	48%	Donald Trump	30%	Gary Johnson	6%	18	732	?
Capitol Fax/We Ask America	June 5–6, 2016	Hillary Clinton	47%	Donald Trump	35%	Gary Johnson	7%	12	1,231 RV	± 3%

Four-way race

Poll source	Date administered	Democrat	%	Republican	%	Libertarian	%	Green Party	%	Lead margin	Sample size	Margin of error
Victory Research	July 14–16, 2016	Hillary Clinton	51%	Donald Trump	34%	Gary Johnson	7%	Jill Stein	7%	17	1,200	± 2.83%
Basswood Research	July 11–12, 2016	Hillary Clinton	46%	Donald Trump	33%	Gary Johnson	5%	Jill Stein	3%	13	800	± 3.5%

== Indiana ==
11 electoral votes
(Democratic in 2008) 50%–49%
(Republican in 2012) 54%–44%

Poll source	Date administered	Democrat	%	Republican	%	Lead margin	Sample size	Margin of error
Tarrance Group	July 20–21, 2016	Hillary Clinton	36%	Donald Trump	50%	14	503	± 4.4%
Bellwether	May 11–15, 2016	Hillary Clinton	31%	Donald Trump	40%	9	600	± 4.0%
NBC News/Wall Street Journal/Marist	April 26–28, 2016	Hillary Clinton	41%	Donald Trump	48%	7	2,149	± 2.1%
NBC News/Wall Street Journal/Marist	April 26–28, 2016	Hillary Clinton	43%	Ted Cruz	50%	7	2,149	± 2.1%
NBC News/Wall Street Journal/Marist	April 26–28, 2016	Hillary Clinton	37%	John Kasich	56%	19	2,149	± 2.1%
NBC News/Wall Street Journal/Marist	April 26–28, 2016	Bernie Sanders	46%	Donald Trump	47%	1	2,149	± 2.1%
NBC News/Wall Street Journal/Marist	April 26–28, 2016	Bernie Sanders	48%	Ted Cruz	45%	3	2,149	± 2.1%
NBC News/Wall Street Journal/Marist	April 26–28, 2016	Bernie Sanders	46%	John Kasich	47%	1	2,149	± 2.1%
POS /Howey Politics Indiana/WTHR Channel 13	April 18–21, 2016	Hillary Clinton	39%	Donald Trump	47%	8	500	± 4.0%
POS /Howey Politics Indiana/WTHR Channel 13	April 18–21, 2016	Hillary Clinton	36%	Ted Cruz	53%	17	500	± 4.0%

Three-way race

Poll source	Date administered	Democrat	%	Republican	%	Independent/ Third-party candidate	%	Lead margin	Sample size	Margin of error
Monmouth University	August 13–16, 2016	Hillary Clinton	36%	Donald Trump	47%	Gary Johnson	10%	11	403	± 4.9%

== Iowa ==
6 electoral votes
(Democratic in 2008) 54%–44%
(Democratic in 2012) 52%–46%

Poll source	Date administered	Democrat	%	Republican	%	Lead margin	Sample size	Margin of error
Public Policy Polling	August 30–31, 2016	Hillary Clinton	45%	Donald Trump	43%	2	827	± 3.4%
Quinnipiac University	August 9–16, 2016	Hillary Clinton	47%	Donald Trump	44%	3	846	± 3.4%
Suffolk University	August 8–10, 2016	Hillary Clinton	40%	Donald Trump	41%	1	500	± 4.4%
NBC News/Wall Street Journal/Marist	August 3–7, 2016	Hillary Clinton	41%	Donald Trump	37%	4	899	± 3.1%
NBC News/Wall Street Journal/Marist	July 5–10, 2016	Hillary Clinton	42%	Donald Trump	39%	3	822	± 3.4%
Gravis Marketing	July 7–8, 2016	Hillary Clinton	42%	Donald Trump	40%	2	1,318	± 2.7%
Loras College	June 24–28, 2016	Hillary Clinton	48%	Donald Trump	34%	14	600	± 4%
Public Policy Polling	June 22–23, 2016	Hillary Clinton	41%	Donald Trump	39%	2	897	± 3.3%
Public Policy Polling	June 9–10, 2016	Hillary Clinton	44%	Donald Trump	41%	3	630	± 3.9%
Public Policy Polling	January 8–10, 2016	Hillary Clinton	40%	Jeb Bush	43%	3	1,901	± 2.3%
Public Policy Polling	January 8–10, 2016	Hillary Clinton	42%	Ben Carson	46%	4	1,901	± 2.3%
Public Policy Polling	January 8–10, 2016	Hillary Clinton	42%	Ted Cruz	45%	3	1,901	± 2.3%
Public Policy Polling	January 8–10, 2016	Hillary Clinton	41%	Marco Rubio	46%	5	1,901	± 2.3%
Public Policy Polling	January 8–10, 2016	Hillary Clinton	42%	Donald Trump	42%	Tied	1,901	± 2.3%
Public Policy Polling	January 8–10, 2016	Bernie Sanders	47%	Jeb Bush	39%	8	1,901	± 2.3%
Public Policy Polling	January 8–10, 2016	Bernie Sanders	44%	Ben Carson	40%	4	1,901	± 2.3%
Public Policy Polling	January 8–10, 2016	Bernie Sanders	45%	Ted Cruz	42%	3	1,901	± 2.3%
Public Policy Polling	January 8–10, 2016	Bernie Sanders	43%	Marco Rubio	42%	1	1,901	± 2.3%
Public Policy Polling	January 8–10, 2016	Bernie Sanders	47%	Donald Trump	42%	5	1,901	± 2.3%
NBC News/Wall Street Journal/Marist	January 2–7, 2016	Hillary Clinton	48%	Donald Trump	40%	8	1,470	± 2.6%
NBC News/Wall Street Journal/Marist	January 2–7, 2016	Hillary Clinton	43%	Ted Cruz	47%	4	1,470	± 2.6%
NBC News/Wall Street Journal/Marist	January 2–7, 2016	Hillary Clinton	42%	Marco Rubio	47%	5	1,470	± 2.6%
NBC News/Wall Street Journal/Marist	January 2–7, 2016	Bernie Sanders	51%	Donald Trump	38%	13	1,470	± 2.6%
NBC News/Wall Street Journal/Marist	January 2–7, 2016	Bernie Sanders	47%	Ted Cruz	42%	5	1,470	± 2.6%
NBC News/Wall Street Journal/Marist	January 2–7, 2016	Bernie Sanders	44%	Marco Rubio	44%	Tied	1,470	± 2.6%

Four-way race

Poll source	Date administered	Democrat	%	Republican	%	Libertarian	%	Green	%	Lead margin	Sample size	Margin of error
Emerson College	August 31 – September 1, 2016	Hillary Clinton	39%	Donald Trump	44%	Gary Johnson	8%	Jill Stein	1%	5	600	± 3.9%
CBS News/YouGov	August 17–19, 2016	Hillary Clinton	40%	Donald Trump	40%	Gary Johnson	7%	Jill Stein	2%	Tied	987	± 4%
Quinnipiac University	August 9–16, 2016	Hillary Clinton	41%	Donald Trump	39%	Gary Johnson	12%	Jill Stein	3%	2	846	± 3.4%
Suffolk University	August 8–10, 2016	Hillary Clinton	36%	Donald Trump	37%	Gary Johnson	6%	Jill Stein	3%	1	500	± 4.4%
NBC News/Wall Street Journal/Marist	August 3–7, 2016	Hillary Clinton	35%	Donald Trump	35%	Gary Johnson	12%	Jill Stein	6%	Tied	899	± 3.1%
CBS News/YouGov	July 13–15, 2016	Hillary Clinton	39%	Donald Trump	40%	Gary Johnson	3%	Jill Stein	2%	1	998	± 4.8%
Monmouth University	July 8–11, 2016	Hillary Clinton	42%	Donald Trump	44%	Gary Johnson	6%	Jill Stein	1%	2	401	± 4.9%
NBC News/Wall Street Journal/Marist	July 5–10, 2016	Hillary Clinton	37%	Donald Trump	37%	Gary Johnson	7%	Jill Stein	4%	Tied	822	± 3.4%
Gravis Marketing	July 7–8, 2016	Hillary Clinton	39%	Donald Trump	37%	Gary Johnson	8%	Jill Stein	2%	2	1,318	± 2.7%
Loras College	June 24–28, 2016	Hillary Clinton	44%	Donald Trump	31%	Gary Johnson	6%	Jill Stein	2%	13	600	± 4.0%

== Kansas ==
6 electoral votes
(Republican in 2008) 56%–42%
(Republican in 2012) 60%–38%

Poll source	Date administered	Democrat	%	Republican	%	Lead margin	Sample size	Margin of error
John Zogby Strategies	June 4–6, 2016	Hillary Clinton	43%	Donald Trump	36%	7	433	± 4.7%
Fort Hays State University	February 19–26, 2016	Hillary Clinton	36%	Donald Trump	46%	10	440	± 5.0%
Fort Hays State University	February 19–26, 2016	Hillary Clinton	35%	Ted Cruz	49%	14	440	± 5.0%
Fort Hays State University	February 19–26, 2016	Hillary Clinton	32%	Marco Rubio	51%	19	440	± 5.0%
Fort Hays State University	February 19–26, 2016	Bernie Sanders	43%	Donald Trump	42%	1	440	± 5.0%
Fort Hays State University	February 19–26, 2016	Bernie Sanders	38%	Ted Cruz	44%	6	440	± 5.0%
Fort Hays State University	February 19–26, 2016	Bernie Sanders	36%	Marco Rubio	46%	10	440	± 5.0%

Three-way race

Poll source	Date administered	Democrat	%	Republican	%	Libertarian	%	Lead margin	Sample size	Margin of error
SurveyUSA/KSN News	August 9, 2016	Hillary Clinton	39%	Donald Trump	44%	Gary Johnson	8%	5	566	±4.2%
Fort Hays State University	July 11–21, 2016	Hillary Clinton	27%	Donald Trump	44%	Gary Johnson	7%	17	542	±4.4%
SurveyUSA/KSN News	July 8–11, 2016	Hillary Clinton	36%	Donald Trump	47%	Gary Johnson	8%	11	559	± 4.2%

Four-way race

Poll source	Date administered	Democrat	%	Republican	%	Libertarian	%	Green	%	Lead margin	Sample size	Margin of error
Remington Research Group	August 22–23, 2016	Hillary Clinton	37%	Donald Trump	44%	Gary Johnson	8%	Jill Stein	2%	7	7,769	± 1.5%

== Kentucky ==
8 electoral votes
(Republican in 2008) 57%–41%
(Republican in 2012) 60%–38%

Poll source	Date administered	Democrat	%	Republican	%	Lead margin	Sample size	Margin of error
Bellwether	August 2–4, 2016	Hillary Clinton	25%	Donald Trump	41%	16	508	± 4.0%
Bellwether	July 5–7, 2016	Hillary Clinton	28%	Donald Trump	34%	6	776	± 3%

Four-way race

Poll source	Date administered	Democrat	%	Republican	%	Libertarian	%	Green	%	Lead margin	Sample size	Margin of error
RunSwitch PR/Harper	July 31 – August 1, 2016	Hillary Clinton	36%	Donald Trump	49%	Gary Johnson	5%	Jill Stein	2%	13	500	± 4.4%

== Louisiana ==
8 electoral votes
(Republican in 2008) 59%–40%
(Republican in 2012) 58%–41%

Two-way race

Poll source	Date administered	Democrat	%	Republican	%	Lead margin	Sample size	Margin of error
JMC Analytics and Polling	May 5–6, 2016	Hillary Clinton	36%	Donald Trump	52%	16	624	± 3.9%
JMC Analytics and Polling	May 5–6, 2016	Bernie Sanders	32%	Donald Trump	55%	23	624	± 3.9%

== Maine ==
4 electoral votes (Statewide vote worth 2 EVs; 1st and 2nd congressional districts worth 1 EV each)
(Democratic in 2008) 58%–40%
(Democratic in 2012) 56%–41%

Poll source	Date administered	Democrat	%	Republican	%	Lead margin	Sample size	Margin of error
Univ. of N.H./PPH/Maine Sunday Telegram	June 15–21, 2016	Hillary Clinton	42%	Donald Trump	35%	7	475	± 4.5%
Bangor Daily News	March 3–4, 2016	Hillary Clinton	43%	Donald Trump	34%	9	610 RV	± 3%
Bangor Daily News	March 3–4, 2016	Bernie Sanders	57%	Donald Trump	31%	26	610 RV	± 3%

== Maryland ==
10 electoral votes
(Democratic in 2008) 62%–36%
(Democratic in 2012) 62%–36%

Poll source	Date administered	Democrat	%	Republican	%	Lead margin	Sample size	Margin of error
Public Policy Polling	April 15–17, 2016	Hillary Clinton	61%	Donald Trump	28%	33	879	± 3.3%
Public Policy Polling	April 15–17, 2016	Hillary Clinton	58%	Ted Cruz	24%	34	879	± 3.3%
Public Policy Polling	April 15–17, 2016	Hillary Clinton	54%	John Kasich	33%	21	879	± 3.3%
Public Policy Polling	April 15–17, 2016	Bernie Sanders	60%	Donald Trump	29%	31	879	± 3.3%
Public Policy Polling	April 15–17, 2016	Bernie Sanders	62%	Ted Cruz	24%	38	879	± 3.3%
Public Policy Polling	April 15–17, 2016	Bernie Sanders	52%	John Kasich	32%	20	879	± 3.3%
NBC4/Marist	April 5–9, 2016	Hillary Clinton	63%	Donald Trump	27%	36	2,563	± 1.9%
NBC4/Marist	April 5–9, 2016	Hillary Clinton	60%	Ted Cruz	31%	29	2,563	± 1.9%
NBC4/Marist	April 5–9, 2016	Hillary Clinton	55%	John Kasich	38%	17	2,563	± 1.9%
NBC4/Marist	April 5–9, 2016	Bernie Sanders	65%	Donald Trump	26%	39	2,563	± 1.9%
NBC4/Marist	April 5–9, 2016	Bernie Sanders	63%	Ted Cruz	28%	35	2,563	± 1.9%
NBC4/Marist	April 5–9, 2016	Bernie Sanders	55%	John Kasich	36%	19	2,563	± 1.9%
Washington Post/University of Maryland	March 30 – April 4, 2016	Hillary Clinton	63%	Donald Trump	28%	35	1,503	± N/A%

Four-way race

Poll source	Date administered	Democrat	%	Republican	%	Libertarian	%	Green	%	Lead margin	Sample size	Margin of error
OpinionWorks	August 18–30, 2016	Hillary Clinton	54%	Donald Trump	25%	Gary Johnson	6%	Jill Stein	2%	29	754	± 3.6%

== Massachusetts ==
11 electoral votes
(Democratic in 2008) 62%–36%
(Democratic in 2012) 61%–38%

Poll source	Date administered	Democrat	%	Republican	%	Lead margin	Sample size	Margin of error
Boston Globe/Suffolk University	May 2–5, 2016	Hillary Clinton	55%	Donald Trump	31%	24	500	± 4.4%
Western New England University	April 1–10, 2016	Hillary Clinton	62%	Donald Trump	26%	36	497	± 4.0%
Western New England University	April 1–10, 2016	Hillary Clinton	63%	Ted Cruz	30%	33	497	± 4.0%
Western New England University	April 1–10, 2016	Bernie Sanders	70%	Donald Trump	23%	47	497	± 4.0%
Western New England University	April 1–10, 2016	Bernie Sanders	71%	Ted Cruz	24%	47	497	± 4.0%

== Michigan ==
16 electoral votes
(Democratic in 2008) 57%–41%
(Democratic in 2012) 54%–45%

Poll source	Date administered	Democrat	%	Republican	%	Lead margin	Sample size	Margin of error
Fox 2 Detroit/Mitchell Poll	August 9–10, 2016	Hillary Clinton	49%	Donald Trump	39%	10	1,314	± 2.7%
EPIC-MRA	July 30 – August 4, 2016	Hillary Clinton	46%	Donald Trump	36%	10	600	± 4%
Mitchell Research	July 5–11, 2016	Hillary Clinton	40%	Donald Trump	34%	6	600	± 4.0%
Gravis Marketing	July 7–8, 2016	Hillary Clinton	48%	Donald Trump	41%	7	1,562	± 2.4%
Greenberg Quinlan Rosner	June 11–20, 2016	Hillary Clinton	50%	Donald Trump	39%	11	300	± 5.66%
Detroit News/WDIV-TV	May 24–26, 2016	Hillary Clinton	43%	Donald Trump	39%	4	600	± 4%
Detroit News/WDIV-TV	May 24–26, 2016	Bernie Sanders	52%	Donald Trump	33%	19	600	± 4%
SurveyUSA	March 23–24, 2016	Hillary Clinton	49%	Donald Trump	38%	11	904	± 3.3%
SurveyUSA	March 23–24, 2016	Hillary Clinton	49%	Ted Cruz	39%	10	904	± 3.3%
SurveyUSA	March 23–24, 2016	Hillary Clinton	41%	John Kasich	46%	5	904	± 3.3%
SurveyUSA	March 23–24, 2016	Bernie Sanders	55%	Donald Trump	36%	19	904	± 3.3%
SurveyUSA	March 23–24, 2016	Bernie Sanders	56%	Ted Cruz	35%	21	904	± 3.3%
SurveyUSA	March 23–24, 2016	Bernie Sanders	47%	John Kasich	42%	5	904	± 3.3%
SurveyUSA	March 23–24, 2016	Hillary Clinton	48%	Mitt Romney	35%	13	904	± 3.3%
SurveyUSA	March 23–24, 2016	Hillary Clinton	48%	Paul Ryan	38%	10	904	± 3.3%
EPIC-MRA	March 19–22, 2016	Hillary Clinton	47%	Donald Trump	37%	10	600	± 4%
NBC News/Wall Street Journal/Marist	March 1–3, 2016	Hillary Clinton	52%	Donald Trump	36%	16	2,229	± 2.1%
NBC News/Wall Street Journal/Marist	March 1–3, 2016	Hillary Clinton	48%	Ted Cruz	41%	7	2,229	± 2.1%
NBC News/Wall Street Journal/Marist	March 1–3, 2016	Bernie Sanders	56%	Donald Trump	34%	22	2,229	± 2.1%
NBC News/Wall Street Journal/Marist	March 1–3, 2016	Bernie Sanders	54%	Ted Cruz	36%	18	2,229	± 2.1%
Marketing Resource Group	February 22–27, 2016	Hillary Clinton	44%	Donald Trump	39%	5	600	± 4%
Marketing Resource Group	February 22–27, 2016	Hillary Clinton	44%	Ted Cruz	39%	5	600	± 4%
Marketing Resource Group	February 22–27, 2016	Hillary Clinton	41%	Marco Rubio	43%	2%	600	± 4%
EPIC-MRA	January 23–26, 2016	Hillary Clinton	43%	Donald Trump	41%	2	600	± 4%

Three-way race

Poll source	Date administered	Democrat	%	Republican	%	Independent/ Third-party candidate	%	Lead margin	Sample size	Margin of error
Greenberg Quinlan Rosner	June 11–20, 2016	Hillary Clinton	48%	Donald Trump	33%	Gary Johnson	12%	15	300	± 5.66%
Detroit News/WDIV-TV	May 24–26, 2016	Hillary Clinton	37%	Donald Trump	33%	Gary Johnson	12%	4	600	± 4%

Four-way race

Poll source	Date administered	Democrat	%	Republican	%	Libertarian	%	Green	%	Lead margin	Sample size	Margin of error
Emerson College	August 25–28, 2016	Hillary Clinton	45%	Donald Trump	40%	Gary Johnson	7%	Jill Stein	3%	5	800	± 3.4%
Suffolk University	August 22–24, 2016	Hillary Clinton	44%	Donald Trump	37%	Gary Johnson	5%	Jill Stein	3%	7	500	± 4.4%
Fox 2 Detroit/Mitchell Poll	August 9–10, 2016	Hillary Clinton	44%	Donald Trump	33%	Gary Johnson	9%	Jill Stein	5%	11	1,314	± 2.7%
EPIC-MRA	July 30 – August 4, 2016	Hillary Clinton	43%	Donald Trump	32%	Gary Johnson	8%	Jill Stein	3%	11	600	± 4%
The Detroit News/WDIV-TV	July 30 – August 1, 2016	Hillary Clinton	41%	Donald Trump	32%	Gary Johnson	8%	Jill Stein	3%	9	600	± 4.0%
CBS News/YouGov	July 13–15, 2016	Hillary Clinton	42%	Donald Trump	39%	Gary Johnson	5%	Jill Stein	2%	3	1,201	± 4.1%
Marketing Resource Group	July 11–15, 2016	Hillary Clinton	34%	Donald Trump	29%	Gary Johnson	3%	Jill Stein	2%	5	800	± 3.46%
Gravis Marketing	July 7–8, 2016	Hillary Clinton	37%	Donald Trump	34%	Gary Johnson	2%	Jill Stein	1%	3	1,562	± 2.4%

== Minnesota ==
10 electoral votes
(Democratic in 2008) 54%–44%
(Democratic in 2012) 53%–45%

Poll source	Date administered	Democrat	%	Republican	%	Lead margin	Sample size	Margin of error
Star Tribune	April 25–27, 2016	Hillary Clinton	48%	Donald Trump	35%	13	800	± 3.5%
Star Tribune	April 25–27, 2016	Hillary Clinton	49%	Ted Cruz	40%	9	800	± 3.5%
Star Tribune	April 25–27, 2016	Bernie Sanders	53%	Donald Trump	38%	15	800	± 3.5%
Star Tribune	April 25–27, 2016	Bernie Sanders	50%	Ted Cruz	36%	14	800	± 3.5%
Star Tribune/Mason-Dixon	January 18–20, 2016	Hillary Clinton	43%	Donald Trump	38%	5	800	± 3.5%
Star Tribune/Mason-Dixon	January 18–20, 2016	Hillary Clinton	43%	Ted Cruz	45%	2	800	± 3.5%
Star Tribune/Mason-Dixon	January 18–20, 2016	Hillary Clinton	40%	Marco Rubio	49%	9	800	± 3.5%
Star Tribune/Mason-Dixon	January 18–20, 2016	Bernie Sanders	53%	Donald Trump	37%	16	800	± 3.5%

== Missouri ==
10 electoral votes
(Republican in 2008) 49.4%–49.2%
(Republican in 2012) 53%–44%

Poll source	Date administered	Democrat	%	Republican	%	Lead margin	Sample size	Margin of error
Public Policy Polling	August 26–27, 2016	Hillary Clinton	41%	Donald Trump	47%	6	1,055	± 3.0%
Public Policy Polling	August 8–9, 2016	Hillary Clinton	42%	Donald Trump	45%	3	947	± 3.2%
Public Policy Polling	July 11–12, 2016	Hillary Clinton	40%	Donald Trump	50%	10	959	± 3.2%
Missouri Scout	May 20–21, 2016	Hillary Clinton	40%	Donald Trump	46%	6	1301	± 2.8%
DFM Research	March 17–24, 2016	Hillary Clinton	42%	Donald Trump	40%	2	674	± 3.8%
Fort Hayes State University	March 3–10, 2016	Bernie Sanders	37%	Marco Rubio	43%	6	475	± 4.6%
Fort Hayes State University	March 3–10, 2016	Hillary Clinton	31%	Marco Rubio	49%	18	475	± 4.6%
Fort Hayes State University	March 3–10, 2016	Bernie Sanders	36%	Ted Cruz	45%	9	475	± 4.6%
Fort Hayes State University	March 3–10, 2016	Hillary Clinton	34%	Ted Cruz	51%	17	475	± 4.6%
Fort Hayes State University	March 3–10, 2016	Bernie Sanders	43%	Donald Trump	40%	3	475	± 4.6%
Fort Hayes State University	March 3–10, 2016	Hillary Clinton	38%	Donald Trump	43%	5	475	± 4.6%

Three-way race

Poll source	Date administered	Democrat	%	Republican	%	Libertarian	%	Lead margin	Sample size	Margin of error
Monmouth University	August 19–22, 2016	Hillary Clinton	43%	Donald Trump	44%	Gary Johnson	8%	1	401	± 4.9%
SurveyUSA/KSDK	July 20–24, 2016	Hillary Clinton	37%	Donald Trump	47%	Gary Johnson	8%	10	1,943	± 2.3%

Four-way race

Poll source	Date administered	Democrat	%	Republican	%	Libertarian	%	Green	%	Lead margin	Sample size	Margin of error
Remington Research Group	August 5–6, 2016	Hillary Clinton	42%	Donald Trump	44%	Gary Johnson	5%	Jill Stein	2%	2	1,280	± 3%
St. Louis/Post-Dispatch	July 23–24, 2016	Hillary Clinton	41%	Donald Trump	40%	Gary Johnson	9%	Jill Stein	1%	1	625	± 4%
Public Policy Polling	July 11–12, 2016	Hillary Clinton	36%	Donald Trump	46%	Gary Johnson	7%	Jill Stein	1%	10	959	± 3.2%

== Nevada ==
6 electoral votes
(Democratic in 2008) 55%–43%
(Democratic in 2012) 52%–46%

Two-way race

Poll source	Date administered	Democrat	%	Republican	%	Lead margin	Sample size	Margin of error
Greenberg Quinlan Rosner	June 11–20, 2016	Hillary Clinton	45%	Donald Trump	47%	2	300	± 5.66%
TargetPoint/Just Win Strategies	June 14–18, 2016	Hillary Clinton	46%	Donald Trump	45%	1	200	?
Gravis Marketing	May 24–25, 2016	Hillary Clinton	42%	Donald Trump	47%	5	1 637	± 2%

Three-way

Poll source	Date administered	Democrat	%	Republican	%	Libertarian	%	Lead margin	Sample size	Margin of error
Suffolk	August 15–17, 2016	Hillary Clinton	44%	Donald Trump	42%	Gary Johnson	5%	2	500	± 4.4%
KTNV/Rasmussen Reports	July 29–31, 2016	Hillary Clinton	41%	Donald Trump	40%	Gary Johnson	10%	1	750	± 4%
KTNV/Rasmussen Reports	July 22–24, 2016	Hillary Clinton	38%	Donald Trump	43%	Gary Johnson	8%	5	750	± 4%
Monmouth University	July 7–10, 2016	Hillary Clinton	45%	Donald Trump	41%	Gary Johnson	5%	4	408	± 4.9%
Greenberg Quinlan Rosner	June 11–20, 2016	Hillary Clinton	44%	Donald Trump	44%	Gary Johnson	9%	Tied	300	± 5.66%
Gravis Marketing	May 24–25, 2016	Hillary Clinton	41%	Donald Trump	44%	Gary Johnson	8%	3	1 637	± 2%

Four-way race

Poll source	Date administered	Democrat	%	Republican	%	Libertarian	%	Green	%	Lead margin	Sample size	Margin of error
CBS News/YouGov	August 2–5, 2016	Hillary Clinton	43%	Donald Trump	41%	Gary Johnson	4%	Jill Stein	3%	2	993	± 4.6%

Five-way race

Poll source	Date administered	Democrat	%	Republican	%	Libertarian	%	IAPN	%	Unaffiliated	%	Lead margin	Sample size	Margin of error
Suffolk University	August 15–17, 2016	Hillary Clinton	43.8%	Donald Trump	41.6%	Gary Johnson	4.8%	Darrell Castle	1%	Rocky De La Fuente	1%	2.2	500	± 4.4%

== New Hampshire ==
4 electoral votes
(Democratic in 2008) 54%–45%
(Democratic in 2012) 52%–46%

Poll source	Date administered	Democrat	%	Republican	%	Lead margin	Sample size	Margin of error
Public Policy Polling	August 30–31, 2016	Hillary Clinton	46%	Donald Trump	41%	5	585	± 4.1%
Public Policy Polling	August 26–28, 2016	Hillary Clinton	46%	Donald Trump	40%	6	977	± 3.1%
WMUR/University of New Hampshire	August 20–28, 2016	Hillary Clinton	45%	Donald Trump	36%	9	433	± 4.7%
Public Policy Polling	August 5–7, 2016	Hillary Clinton	50%	Donald Trump	37%	13	802	± 3.5%
MassINC/WBUR	July 29 – August 1, 2016	Hillary Clinton	51%	Donald Trump	34%	17	609	± 4%
NH Journal	July 19–21, 2016	Hillary Clinton	39%	Donald Trump	48%	9	1,166	± 5.1%
WMUR/University of New Hampshire	July 9–18, 2016	Hillary Clinton	39%	Donald Trump	37%	2	469	± 4.5%
American Research Group	June 24–28, 2016	Hillary Clinton	47%	Donald Trump	42%	5	533	± 4.2%
Public Policy Polling	June 22–23, 2016	Hillary Clinton	43%	Donald Trump	39%	4	578	± 4.1%
Greenberg Quinlan Rosner	June 11–20, 2016	Hillary Clinton	51%	Donald Trump	47%	4	300	± 5.66%
TargetPoint/Just Win Strategies	June 14–18, 2016	Hillary Clinton	44%	Donald Trump	40%	4	200	?
Boston Herald/Franklin Pierce University	May 25–28, 2016	Hillary Clinton	44%	Donald Trump	44%	Tied	405	± 4.9%
MassINC/WBUR	May 12–15, 2016	Hillary Clinton	44%	Donald Trump	42%	2	501	± 4.4%
MassINC/WBUR	May 12–15, 2016	Bernie Sanders	54%	Donald Trump	38%	16	501	± 4.4%
WMUR/University of New Hampshire	April 7–17, 2016	Hillary Clinton	50%	Donald Trump	31%	19	553	± 4.2%
WMUR/University of New Hampshire	April 7–17, 2016	Hillary Clinton	48%	Ted Cruz	34%	14	553	± 4.2%
WMUR/University of New Hampshire	April 7–17, 2016	Hillary Clinton	36%	John Kasich	50%	14	553	± 4.2%
WMUR/University of New Hampshire	April 7–17, 2016	Bernie Sanders	58%	Donald Trump	31%	27	553	± 4.2%
WMUR/University of New Hampshire	April 7–17, 2016	Bernie Sanders	61%	Ted Cruz	30%	31	553	± 4.2%
WMUR/University of New Hampshire	April 7–17, 2016	Bernie Sanders	50%	John Kasich	44%	6	553	± 4.2%
Dartmouth College	April 11–15, 2016	Hillary Clinton	34%	Donald Trump	29%	5	362	± 5.15%
Dartmouth College	April 11–15, 2016	Hillary Clinton	34%	Ted Cruz	33%	1	362	± 5.15%
Dartmouth College	April 11–15, 2016	Hillary Clinton	26%	John Kasich	53%	27	362	± 5.15%
Dartmouth College	April 11–15, 2016	Bernie Sanders	49%	Donald Trump	28%	21	362	± 5.15%
Dartmouth College	April 11–15, 2016	Bernie Sanders	48%	Ted Cruz	26%	22	362	± 5.15%
Dartmouth College	April 11–15, 2016	Bernie Sanders	39%	John Kasich	44%	5	362	± 5.15%
WMUR/University of New Hampshire	February 20–28, 2016	Bernie Sanders	55%	Donald Trump	34%	21	628	± 3.9%
WMUR/University of New Hampshire	February 20–28, 2016	Bernie Sanders	60%	Ted Cruz	28%	32	628	± 3.9%
WMUR/University of New Hampshire	February 20–28, 2016	Bernie Sanders	54%	Marco Rubio	35%	19	628	± 3.9%
WMUR/University of New Hampshire	February 20–28, 2016	Bernie Sanders	48%	John Kasich	40%	8	628	± 3.9%
WMUR/University of New Hampshire	February 20–28, 2016	Hillary Clinton	47%	Donald Trump	39%	8	628	± 3.9%
WMUR/University of New Hampshire	February 20–28, 2016	Hillary Clinton	46%	Ted Cruz	35%	11	628	± 3.9%
WMUR/University of New Hampshire	February 20–28, 2016	Hillary Clinton	45%	Marco Rubio	43%	2	628	± 3.9%
WMUR/University of New Hampshire	February 20–28, 2016	Hillary Clinton	37%	John Kasich	47%	10	628	± 3.9%
UMass Lowell/7News	February 5–7, 2016	Hillary Clinton	45%	Donald Trump	40%	5	1,411	± 2.99%
UMass Lowell/7News	February 5–7, 2016	Hillary Clinton	45%	Ted Cruz	40%	5	1,411	± 2.99%
UMass Lowell/7News	February 5–7, 2016	Hillary Clinton	40%	Marco Rubio	44%	4	1,411	± 2.99%
UMass Lowell/7News	February 5–7, 2016	Bernie Sanders	55%	Donald Trump	34%	21	1,411	± 2.99%
UMass Lowell/7News	February 5–7, 2016	Bernie Sanders	56%	Ted Cruz	31%	25	1,411	± 2.99%
UMass Lowell/7News	February 5–7, 2016	Bernie Sanders	54%	Marco Rubio	34%	20	1,411	± 2.99%
UMass Lowell/7News	February 4–6, 2016	Hillary Clinton	45%	Donald Trump	39%	6	1,413	± 2.97%
UMass Lowell/7News	February 4–6, 2016	Hillary Clinton	45%	Ted Cruz	39%	6	1,413	± 2.97%
UMass Lowell/7News	February 4–6, 2016	Hillary Clinton	40%	Marco Rubio	45%	5	1,413	± 2.97%
UMass Lowell/7News	February 4–6, 2016	Bernie Sanders	55%	Donald Trump	33%	22	1,413	± 2.97%
UMass Lowell/7News	February 4–6, 2016	Bernie Sanders	57%	Ted Cruz	30%	27	1,413	± 2.97%
UMass Lowell/7News	February 4–6, 2016	Bernie Sanders	55%	Marco Rubio	35%	20	1,413	± 2.97%
UMass Lowell/7News	February 3–5, 2016	Hillary Clinton	46%	Donald Trump	39%	7	1,421	± 2.90%
UMass Lowell/7News	February 3–5, 2016	Hillary Clinton	46%	Ted Cruz	39%	7	1,421	± 2.90%
UMass Lowell/7News	February 3–5, 2016	Hillary Clinton	42%	Marco Rubio	43%	1	1,421	± 2.90%
UMass Lowell/7News	February 3–5, 2016	Bernie Sanders	54%	Donald Trump	34%	20	1,421	± 2.90%
UMass Lowell/7News	February 3–5, 2016	Bernie Sanders	57%	Ted Cruz	30%	27	1,421	± 2.90%
UMass Lowell/7News	February 3–5, 2016	Bernie Sanders	54%	Marco Rubio	35%	19	1,421	± 2.90%
UMass Lowell/7News	February 2–4, 2016	Hillary Clinton	44%	Donald Trump	40%	4	1,417	± 2.89%
UMass Lowell/7News	February 2–4, 2016	Hillary Clinton	44%	Ted Cruz	41%	3	1,417	± 2.89%
UMass Lowell/7News	February 2–4, 2016	Hillary Clinton	41%	Marco Rubio	44%	3	1,417	± 2.89%
UMass Lowell/7News	February 2–4, 2016	Bernie Sanders	54%	Donald Trump	34%	20	1,417	± 2.89%
UMass Lowell/7News	February 2–4, 2016	Bernie Sanders	54%	Ted Cruz	33%	21	1,417	± 2.89%
UMass Lowell/7News	February 2–4, 2016	Bernie Sanders	51%	Marco Rubio	37%	14	1,417	± 2.89%
CNN/WMUR	January 13–18, 2016	Bernie Sanders	57%	Donald Trump	34%	23	903	± 3.4%
CNN/WMUR	January 13–18, 2016	Bernie Sanders	56%	Ted Cruz	33%	23	903	± 3.4%
CNN/WMUR	January 13–18, 2016	Bernie Sanders	55%	Marco Rubio	37%	18	903	± 3.4%
CNN/WMUR	January 13–18, 2016	Bernie Sanders	57%	Chris Christie	34%	23	903	± 3.4%
CNN/WMUR	January 13–18, 2016	Bernie Sanders	54%	John Kasich	33%	21	903	± 3.4%
CNN/WMUR	January 13–18, 2016	Hillary Clinton	48%	Donald Trump	39%	9	903	± 3.4%
CNN/WMUR	January 13–18, 2016	Hillary Clinton	47%	Ted Cruz	41%	6	903	± 3.4%
CNN/WMUR	January 13–18, 2016	Hillary Clinton	44%	Marco Rubio	45%	1	903	± 3.4%
CNN/WMUR	January 13–18, 2016	Hillary Clinton	45%	Chris Christie	42%	3	903	± 3.4%
CNN/WMUR	January 13–18, 2016	Hillary Clinton	43%	John Kasich	43%	Tied	903	± 3.4%
NBC News/Wall Street Journal/Marist	January 2–7, 2016	Hillary Clinton	45%	Donald Trump	44%	1	957	± 3.2%
NBC News/Wall Street Journal/Marist	January 2–7, 2016	Hillary Clinton	44%	Ted Cruz	48%	4	957	± 3.2%
NBC News/Wall Street Journal/Marist	January 2–7, 2016	Hillary Clinton	40%	Marco Rubio	52%	12	957	± 3.2%
NBC News/Wall Street Journal/Marist	January 2–7, 2016	Bernie Sanders	56%	Donald Trump	37%	19	957	± 3.2%
NBC News/Wall Street Journal/Marist	January 2–7, 2016	Bernie Sanders	55%	Ted Cruz	36%	19	957	± 3.2%
NBC News/Wall Street Journal/Marist	January 2–7, 2016	Bernie Sanders	50%	Marco Rubio	41%	9	957	± 3.2%
Public Policy Polling	January 4–6, 2016	Hillary Clinton	46%	Jeb Bush	40%	6	1,036	± 3%
Public Policy Polling	January 4–6, 2016	Hillary Clinton	50%	Ben Carson	39%	11	1,036	± 3%
Public Policy Polling	January 4–6, 2016	Hillary Clinton	48%	Ted Cruz	40%	8	1,036	± 3%
Public Policy Polling	January 4–6, 2016	Hillary Clinton	45%	Marco Rubio	42%	3	1,036	± 3%
Public Policy Polling	January 4–6, 2016	Hillary Clinton	50%	Donald Trump	36%	14	1,036	± 3%
Public Policy Polling	January 4–6, 2016	Bernie Sanders	50%	Jeb Bush	38%	12	1,036	± 3%
Public Policy Polling	January 4–6, 2016	Bernie Sanders	53%	Ben Carson	34%	19	1,036	± 3%
Public Policy Polling	January 4–6, 2016	Bernie Sanders	55%	Ted Cruz	35%	20	1,036	± 3%
Public Policy Polling	January 4–6, 2016	Bernie Sanders	51%	Marco Rubio	37%	14	1,036	± 3%
Public Policy Polling	January 4–6, 2016	Bernie Sanders	54%	Donald Trump	34%	20	1,036	± 3%

Three-way race

Poll source	Date administered	Democrat	%	Republican	%	Independent/ Third-party candidate	%	Lead margin	Sample size	Margin of error
Greenberg Quinlan Rosner	June 11–20, 2016	Hillary Clinton	41%	Donald Trump	41%	Gary Johnson	10%	Tied	300	± 5.66%
MassInc/WBUR	May 12–15, 2016	Hillary Clinton	37%	Donald Trump	33%	Mitt Romney	21%	4	501	± 4.4%
WMUR/University of New Hampshire	April 7–17, 2016	Hillary Clinton	44%	Ted Cruz	22%	Donald Trump	19%	22	553	± 4.2%
Public Policy Polling	January 4–6, 2016	Hillary Clinton	47%	Ted Cruz	28%	Donald Trump	18%	19	1,036	± 3%
Public Policy Polling	January 4–6, 2016	Hillary Clinton	43%	Marco Rubio	29%	Donald Trump	20%	14	1,036	± 3%

Four-way race

Poll source	Date administered	Democrat	%	Republican	%	Libertarian	%	Green	%	Lead margin	Sample size	Margin of error
WMUR/University of New Hampshire	August 20–28, 2016	Hillary Clinton	43%	Donald Trump	32%	Gary Johnson	12%	Jill Stein	4%	11	433	± 4.7%
CBS News/YouGov	August 10–12, 2016	Hillary Clinton	45%	Donald Trump	36%	Gary Johnson	5%	Jill Stein	3%	9	990	± 4.3%
Vox Populi	August 7–8, 2016	Hillary Clinton	41%	Donald Trump	31%	Gary Johnson	11%	Jill Stein	3%	10	820	± 3.4%
MassInc/WBUR	July 29 – August 1, 2016	Hillary Clinton	47%	Donald Trump	32%	Gary Johnson	8%	Jill Stein	3%	15	609	± 4%
WMUR/University of New Hampshire	July 9–18, 2016	Hillary Clinton	37%	Donald Trump	37%	Gary Johnson	10%	Jill Stein	5%	Tied	469	± 4.2%

== New Jersey ==
14 electoral votes
(Democratic in 2008) 57%–42%
(Democratic in 2012) 58%–41%

Poll source	Date administered	Democrat	%	Republican	%	Lead margin	Sample size	Margin of error
Fairleigh Dickinson University	June 22–26, 2016	Hillary Clinton	52%	Donald Trump	31%	21	712	± 3.8%
CBS News/YouGov	May 31 – June 3, 2016	Hillary Clinton	49%	Donald Trump	34%	15	1,194	± 3.8%
CBS News/YouGov	May 31 – June 3, 2016	Bernie Sanders	52%	Donald Trump	34%	18	1,194	± 3.8%
Monmouth University	May 23–27, 2016	Hillary Clinton	38%	Donald Trump	34%	4	806	± 3.7%
Fairleigh Dickinson University	May 18–22, 2016	Hillary Clinton	48%	Donald Trump	37%	11	702	± 3.9%
Fairleigh Dickinson University	May 18–22, 2016	Bernie Sanders	57%	Donald Trump	33%	24	702	± 3.9%
Quinnipiac University	May 10–16, 2016	Hillary Clinton	45%	Donald Trump	38%	7	1,989	± 2.2%
Quinnipiac University	May 10–16, 2016	Bernie Sanders	49%	Donald Trump	37%	12	1,989	± 2.2%
Rutgers	April 1–8, 2016	Hillary Clinton	50%	Donald Trump	36%	14	738	± 4.0%
Rutgers	April 1–8, 2016	Hillary Clinton	50%	Ted Cruz	35%	15	738	± 4.0%
Rutgers	April 1–8, 2016	Hillary Clinton	43%	John Kasich	43%	Tied	738	± 4.0%
Rutgers	April 1–8, 2016	Bernie Sanders	55%	Donald Trump	34%	21	738	± 4.0%
Fairleigh Dickinson University	February 24–28, 2016	Hillary Clinton	52%	Donald Trump	36%	16	694	± 3.9%
Fairleigh Dickinson University	February 24–28, 2016	Bernie Sanders	51%	Donald Trump	36%	15	694	± 3.9%

Three-way race

Poll source	Date administered	Democrat	%	Republican	%	Independent/ Third-party candidate	%	Lead margin	Sample size	Margin of error
Fairleigh Dickinson University	June 22–26, 2016	Hillary Clinton	44%	Donald Trump	32%	Gary Johnson	9%	12	712	± 3.8%

Four-way race

Poll source	Date administered	Democrat	%	Republican	%	Libertarian	%	Green	%	Lead margin	Sample size	Margin of error
Monmouth University	May 23–27, 2016	Hillary Clinton	37%	Donald Trump	31%	Gary Johnson	5%	Jill Stein	4%	6	806	± 3.7%

== New Mexico ==
5 electoral votes
(Democratic in 2008) 57%–42%
(Democratic in 2012) 53%–43%

Three-way race

Poll source	Date administered	Democrat	%	Republican	%	Libertarian	%	Lead margin	Sample size	Margin of error
Public Policy Polling	May 13–15, 2016	Hillary Clinton	41%	Donald Trump	33%	Gary Johnson	14%	8	802	± 3.5%

Four-way race

Poll source	Date administered	Democrat	%	Republican	%	Libertarian	%	Green	%	Lead margin	Sample size	Margin of error
Public Policy Polling	August 19–21, 2016	Hillary Clinton	40%	Donald Trump	31%	Gary Johnson	16%	Jill Stein	4%	9	1,103	± 3%

== New York ==
29 electoral votes
(Democratic in 2008) 63%–36%
(Democratic in 2012) 63%–35%

Poll source	Date administered	Democrat	%	Republican	%	Lead margin	Sample size	Margin of error
Siena College	August 7–10, 2016	Hillary Clinton	57%	Donald Trump	27%	30	717	± 4.3%
Gravis Marketing	August 4–8, 2016	Hillary Clinton	53%	Donald Trump	36%	17	1,717	±2.4%
Quinnipiac University	July 13–17, 2016	Hillary Clinton	47%	Donald Trump	35%	12	1,104	± 3%
Siena College	June 22–28, 2016	Hillary Clinton	54%	Donald Trump	31%	23	803	± 4.0%
Siena College	May 22–26, 2016	Hillary Clinton	52%	Donald Trump	31%	21	825	± 3.9%
Siena College	April 24–27, 2016	Hillary Clinton	56%	Donald Trump	30%	26	802	± 4.1%
Emerson College	April 15–17, 2016	Hillary Clinton	55%	Donald Trump	36%	19	1,047	± 2.95%
Emerson College	April 15–17, 2016	Hillary Clinton	59%	Ted Cruz	28%	31	1,047	± 2.95%
Emerson College	April 15–17, 2016	Hillary Clinton	49%	John Kasich	39%	10	1,047	± 2.95%
Emerson College	April 15–17, 2016	Bernie Sanders	51%	Donald Trump	37%	14	1,047	± 2.95%
Emerson College	April 15–17, 2016	Bernie Sanders	58%	Ted Cruz	27%	31	1,047	± 2.95%
Public Policy Polling	April 7–10, 2016	Hillary Clinton	55%	Donald Trump	35%	20	1,403	± 2.6%
Public Policy Polling	April 7–10, 2016	Hillary Clinton	56%	Ted Cruz	30%	26	1,403	± 2.6%
Public Policy Polling	April 7–10, 2016	Hillary Clinton	50%	John Kasich	36%	14	1,403	± 2.6%
Public Policy Polling	April 7–10, 2016	Bernie Sanders	58%	Donald Trump	33%	25	1,403	± 2.6%
Public Policy Polling	April 7–10, 2016	Bernie Sanders	59%	Ted Cruz	27%	32	1,403	± 2.6%
Public Policy Polling	April 7–10, 2016	Bernie Sanders	54%	John Kasich	35%	19	1,403	± 2.6%
NBC News/Wall Street Journal/Marist	April 6–10, 2016	Hillary Clinton	61%	Donald Trump	32%	29	1,987	± 2.2%
NBC News/Wall Street Journal/Marist	April 6–10, 2016	Hillary Clinton	61%	Ted Cruz	31%	30	1,987	± 2.2%
NBC News/Wall Street Journal/Marist	April 6–10, 2016	Hillary Clinton	53%	John Kasich	38%	15	1,987	± 2.2%
NBC News/Wall Street Journal/Marist	April 6–10, 2016	Bernie Sanders	64%	Donald Trump	31%	33	1,987	± 2.2%
NBC News/Wall Street Journal/Marist	April 6–10, 2016	Bernie Sanders	65%	Ted Cruz	28%	37	1,987	± 2.2%
NBC News/Wall Street Journal/Marist	April 6–10, 2016	Bernie Sanders	57%	John Kasich	35%	22	1,987	± 2.2%
NY1/Baruch College	April 5–10, 2016	Hillary Clinton	51%	Donald Trump	35%	16	1,306	± 2.9%
NY1/Baruch College	April 5–10, 2016	Bernie Sanders	54%	Donald Trump	32%	22	1,306	± 2.9%
Emerson College	April 6–7, 2016	Hillary Clinton	54%	Donald Trump	36%	18	864	± 3.3%
Emerson College	April 6–7, 2016	Hillary Clinton	58%	Ted Cruz	30%	28	864	± 3.3%
Emerson College	April 6–7, 2016	Hillary Clinton	48%	John Kasich	41%	7	864	± 3.3%
Emerson College	April 6–7, 2016	Bernie Sanders	51%	Donald Trump	38%	13	864	± 3.3%
Emerson College	April 6–7, 2016	Bernie Sanders	56%	Ted Cruz	29%	27	864	± 3.3%
Fox News	April 4–7, 2016	Hillary Clinton	53%	Donald Trump	37%	16	1,403	± 2.5%
Fox News	April 4–7, 2016	Bernie Sanders	54%	Donald Trump	35%	19	1,403	± 2.5%
Quinnipiac University	March 22–29, 2016	Hillary Clinton	53%	Donald Trump	33%	20	1,667	± 2.4%
Quinnipiac University	March 22–29, 2016	Hillary Clinton	53%	Ted Cruz	32%	21	1,667	± 2.4%
Quinnipiac University	March 22–29, 2016	Hillary Clinton	46%	John Kasich	41%	5	1,667	± 2.4%
Quinnipiac University	March 22–29, 2016	Bernie Sanders	56%	Donald Trump	32%	24	1,667	± 2.4%
Quinnipiac University	March 22–29, 2016	Bernie Sanders	56%	Ted Cruz	28%	28	1,667	± 2.4%
Quinnipiac University	March 22–29, 2016	Bernie Sanders	47%	John Kasich	37%	10	1,667	± 2.4%
Emerson College	March 14–16, 2016	Hillary Clinton	55%	Donald Trump	36%	19	768	± 3.5%
Emerson College	March 14–16, 2016	Hillary Clinton	61%	Ted Cruz	30%	31	768	± 3.5%
Emerson College	March 14–16, 2016	Bernie Sanders	53%	Donald Trump	36%	17	768	± 3.5%
Siena College	February 28 – March 3, 2016	Hillary Clinton	56%	Marco Rubio	35%	21	800	± 4.1%
Siena College	February 28 – March 3, 2016	Hillary Clinton	58%	Ted Cruz	33%	25	800	± 4.1%
Siena College	February 28 – March 3, 2016	Hillary Clinton	57%	Donald Trump	34%	23	800	± 4.1%
Siena College	February 28 – March 3, 2016	Hillary Clinton	49%	John Kasich	42%	7	800	± 4.1%
Siena College	February 28 – March 3, 2016	Bernie Sanders	58%	Marco Rubio	32%	26	800	± 4.1%
Siena College	February 28 – March 3, 2016	Bernie Sanders	63%	Ted Cruz	26%	37	800	± 4.1%
Siena College	February 28 – March 3, 2016	Bernie Sanders	57%	Donald Trump	33%	24	800	± 4.1%
Siena College	February 28 – March 3, 2016	Bernie Sanders	54%	John Kasich	35%	19	800	± 4.1%
Siena College	January 31 – February 3, 2016	Hillary Clinton	54%	Marco Rubio	37%	17	930	± 3.8%
Siena College	January 31 – February 3, 2016	Hillary Clinton	57%	Ted Cruz	34%	23	930	± 3.8%
Siena College	January 31 – February 3, 2016	Hillary Clinton	57%	Donald Trump	32%	25	930	± 3.8%
Siena College	January 31 – February 3, 2016	Hillary Clinton	57%	Jeb Bush	33%	24	930	± 3.8%
Siena College	January 31 – February 3, 2016	Hillary Clinton	57%	John Kasich	31%	26	930	± 3.8%
Siena College	January 31 – February 3, 2016	Hillary Clinton	55%	Chris Christie	36%	19	930	± 3.8%
Siena College	January 31 – February 3, 2016	Bernie Sanders	56%	Marco Rubio	34%	22	930	± 3.8%
Siena College	January 31 – February 3, 2016	Bernie Sanders	60%	Ted Cruz	30%	30	930	± 3.8%
Siena College	January 31 – February 3, 2016	Bernie Sanders	63%	Donald Trump	30%	33	930	± 3.8%
Siena College	January 31 – February 3, 2016	Bernie Sanders	61%	Jeb Bush	30%	31	930	± 3.8%
Siena College	January 31 – February 3, 2016	Bernie Sanders	59%	John Kasich	29%	30	930	± 3.8%
Siena College	January 31 – February 3, 2016	Bernie Sanders	58%	Chris Christie	35%	23	930	± 3.8%

Three-way race

Poll source	Date administered	Democrat	%	Republican	%	Independent/ Third-party candidate	%	Lead margin	Sample size	Margin of error
Siena College	February 28 – March 3, 2016	Hillary Clinton	42%	Donald Trump	25%	Michael Bloomberg	26%	16	800	± 4.1%
Siena College	February 28 – March 3, 2016	Bernie Sanders	42%	Donald Trump	24%	Michael Bloomberg	28%	14	800	± 4.1%

Four-way race

Poll source	Date administered	Democrat	%	Republican	%	Libertarian Independence	%	Green	%	Lead margin	Sample size	Margin of error
Emerson College	August 28–30, 2016	Hillary Clinton	52%	Donald Trump	34%	Gary Johnson	8%	Jill Stein	3%	18	800	± 3.4%
Siena College	August 7–10, 2016	Hillary Clinton	50%	Donald Trump	25%	Gary Johnson	9%	Jill Stein	6%	25	717	± 4.3%
Gravis Marketing	August 4–8, 2016	Hillary Clinton	48%	Donald Trump	34%	Gary Johnson	6%	Jill Stein	4%	14	1,717	±2.4%
Quinnipiac University	July 13–17, 2016	Hillary Clinton	45%	Donald Trump	33%	Gary Johnson	6%	Jill Stein	4%	12	1,104	± 3%

== North Carolina ==
15 electoral votes
(Democratic in 2008) 50%–49%
(Republican in 2012) 50%–48%

Poll source	Date administered	Democrat	%	Republican	%	Lead margin	Sample size	Margin of error
Quinnipiac University	August 29 – September 7, 2016	Hillary Clinton	47%	Donald Trump	43%	4	751	± 3.6%
Public Policy Polling	August 26–27, 2016	Hillary Clinton	45%	Donald Trump	44%	1	1,177	
CNN/ORC	August 18–23, 2016	Hillary Clinton	48%	Donald Trump	47%	1	803	± 3.5%
Gravis Marketing	August 15–17, 2016	Hillary Clinton	44%	Donald Trump	43%	1	723	± 3.6%
NBC News/Wall Street Journal/Marist	August 4–10, 2016	Hillary Clinton	48%	Donald Trump	39%	9	921	± 3.2%
Public Policy Polling	August 5–7, 2016	Hillary Clinton	47%	Donald Trump	46%	1	830	± 3.4%
NBC News/Wall Street Journal/Marist	July 5–11, 2016	Hillary Clinton	44%	Donald Trump	38%	6	907	± 3.3%
Public Policy Polling	June 20–21, 2016	Hillary Clinton	46%	Donald Trump	48%	2	942	± 3.2%
Greenberg Quinlan Rosner	June 11–20, 2016	Hillary Clinton	51%	Donald Trump	41%	10	300	± 5.66%
Public Policy Polling	May 20–22, 2016	Hillary Clinton	43%	Donald Trump	47%	4	928	3.2%
Public Policy Polling	May 20–22, 2016	Bernie Sanders	48%	Donald Trump	44%	4	928	3.2%
Civitas	April 23–26, 2016	Hillary Clinton	49%	Donald Trump	37%	12	600	4.0%
Civitas	April 23–26, 2016	Bernie Sanders	54%	Donald Trump	35%	19	600	4.0%
Civitas	April 23–26, 2016	Hillary Clinton	46%	Ted Cruz	40%	6	600	4.0%
Civitas	April 23–26, 2016	Bernie Sanders	52%	Ted Cruz	36%	16	600	4.0%
Public Policy Polling	April 22–24, 2016	Hillary Clinton	44%	Donald Trump	44%	Tied	960	3.2
Public Policy Polling	April 22–24, 2016	Hillary Clinton	45%	Ted Cruz	40%	5	960	3.2
Public Policy Polling	April 22–24, 2016	Hillary Clinton	39%	John Kasich	46%	7	960	3.2
Public Policy Polling	April 22–24, 2016	Bernie Sanders	46%	Donald Trump	43%	3	960	3.2
Public Policy Polling	April 22–24, 2016	Bernie Sanders	46%	Ted Cruz	38%	8	960	3.2
Public Policy Polling	April 22–24, 2016	Bernie Sanders	41%	John Kasich	43%	2	960	3.2
Elon University	April 10–15, 2016	Hillary Clinton	45%	Donald Trump	39%	6	621	3.96
Elon University	April 10–15, 2016	Hillary Clinton	41%	Ted Cruz	44%	3	621	3.96
Elon University	April 10–15, 2016	Bernie Sanders	51%	Donald Trump	38%	13	621	3.96
Elon University	April 10–15, 2016	Bernie Sanders	49%	Ted Cruz	39%	10	621	3.96
Public Policy Polling	March 18–20, 2016	Hillary Clinton	44%	Donald Trump	42%	2	843	3.4
Public Policy Polling	March 18–20, 2016	Hillary Clinton	45%	Ted Cruz	42%	3	843	3.4
Public Policy Polling	March 18–20, 2016	Hillary Clinton	41%	John Kasich	49%	8	843	3.4
Public Policy Polling	March 18–20, 2016	Bernie Sanders	48%	Donald Trump	41%	7	843	3.4
Public Policy Polling	March 18–20, 2016	Bernie Sanders	45%	Ted Cruz	42%	3	843	3.4
Public Policy Polling	March 18–20, 2016	Bernie Sanders	41%	John Kasich	44%	3	843	3.4
Elon University	February 15–19, 2016	Hillary Clinton	47%	Donald Trump	41%	6	1,530	2.51
Elon University	February 15–19, 2016	Hillary Clinton	46%	Ted Cruz	46%	Tied	1,530	2.51
Elon University	February 15–19, 2016	Hillary Clinton	45%	Marco Rubio	48%	3	1,530	2.51
Elon University	February 15–19, 2016	Bernie Sanders	48%	Donald Trump	40%	8	1,530	2.51
Elon University	February 15–19, 2016	Bernie Sanders	47%	Ted Cruz	43%	4	1,530	2.51
Elon University	February 15–19, 2016	Bernie Sanders	43%	Marco Rubio	46%	3	1,530	2.51
SurveyUSA	February 14–16, 2016	Hillary Clinton	43%	Donald Trump	45%	2	1,250	2.8%
SurveyUSA	February 14–16, 2016	Hillary Clinton	43%	Ted Cruz	48%	5	1,250	2.8%
SurveyUSA	February 14–16, 2016	Hillary Clinton	42%	Marco Rubio	49%	7	1,250	2.8%
SurveyUSA	February 14–16, 2016	Bernie Sanders	44%	Donald Trump	44%	Tied	1,250	2.8%
SurveyUSA	February 14–16, 2016	Bernie Sanders	46%	Ted Cruz	42%	4	1,250	2.8%
SurveyUSA	February 14–16, 2016	Bernie Sanders	45%	Marco Rubio	44%	1	1,250	2.8%
Public Policy Polling	February 14–16, 2016	Hillary Clinton	42%	Jeb Bush	44%	2	1,291	2.7%
Public Policy Polling	February 14–16, 2016	Hillary Clinton	43%	Ted Cruz	46%	3	1,291	2.7%
Public Policy Polling	February 14–16, 2016	Hillary Clinton	40%	Marco Rubio	49%	9	1,291	2.7%
Public Policy Polling	February 14–16, 2016	Hillary Clinton	43%	Donald Trump	44%	1	1,291	2.7%
Public Policy Polling	February 14–16, 2016	Bernie Sanders	43%	Jeb Bush	42%	1	1,291	2.7%
Public Policy Polling	February 14–16, 2016	Bernie Sanders	43%	Ted Cruz	43%	Tied	1,291	2.7%
Public Policy Polling	February 14–16, 2016	Bernie Sanders	41%	Marco Rubio	45%	4	1,291	2.7%
Public Policy Polling	February 14–16, 2016	Bernie Sanders	44%	Donald Trump	42%	2	1,291	2.7%
Public Policy Polling	January 18–19, 2016	Hillary Clinton	43%	Jeb Bush	45%	2	948	3.2%
Public Policy Polling	January 18–19, 2016	Hillary Clinton	44%	Ben Carson	47%	3	948	3.2%
Public Policy Polling	January 18–19, 2016	Hillary Clinton	43%	Ted Cruz	46%	3	948	3.2%
Public Policy Polling	January 18–19, 2016	Hillary Clinton	42%	Marco Rubio	47%	5	948	3.2%
Public Policy Polling	January 18–19, 2016	Hillary Clinton	43%	Donald Trump	45%	2	948	3.2%
Public Policy Polling	January 18–19, 2016	Bernie Sanders	41%	Jeb Bush	42%	1	948	3.2%
Public Policy Polling	January 18–19, 2016	Bernie Sanders	40%	Ben Carson	44%	4	948	3.2%
Public Policy Polling	January 18–19, 2016	Bernie Sanders	38%	Ted Cruz	43%	5	948	3.2%
Public Policy Polling	January 18–19, 2016	Bernie Sanders	39%	Marco Rubio	43%	4	948	3.2%
Public Policy Polling	January 18–19, 2016	Bernie Sanders	43%	Donald Trump	44%	1	948	3.2%

Three-way race

Poll source	Date administered	Democrat	%	Republican	%	Independent/ Third-party candidate	%	Lead margin	Sample size	Margin of error
Quinnipiac University	August 29 – September 7, 2016	Hillary Clinton	42%	Donald Trump	38%	Gary Johnson	15%	4	751	± 3.6%
Monmouth University	August 20–23, 2016	Hillary Clinton	44%	Donald Trump	42%	Gary Johnson	7%	2	401	± 4.9%
CNN/ORC	August 18–23, 2016	Hillary Clinton	45%	Donald Trump	45%	Gary Johnson	9%	Tied	803	± 3.5%
Civitas/SurveyUSA	July 31 – August 2, 2016	Hillary Clinton	42%	Donald Trump	46%	Gary Johnson	6%	4	400	± 5.0%
Civitas	June 21–23, 2016	Hillary Clinton	42%	Donald Trump	40%	Gary Johnson	6%	2	600	± 4.0%
Greenberg Quinlan Rosner	June 11–20, 2016	Hillary Clinton	48%	Donald Trump	38%	Gary Johnson	8%	10	300	± 5.66%
Civitas	May 21–23, 2016	Hillary Clinton	36%	Donald Trump	39%	Gary Johnson	8%	3	600	± 4.0%
Public Policy Polling	February 14–16, 2016	Hillary Clinton	37%	Donald Trump	39%	Michael Bloomberg	14%	2	1,291	± 2.7%
Public Policy Polling	February 14–16, 2016	Bernie Sanders	34%	Donald Trump	40%	Michael Bloomberg	16%	6	1,291	± 2.7%
Public Policy Polling	January 18–19, 2016	Hillary Clinton	40%	Donald Trump	41%	Michael Bloomberg	10%	1	948	3.2%
Public Policy Polling	January 18–19, 2016	Hillary Clinton	40%	Donald Trump	42%	Jim Webb	7%	2	948	3.2%

Four-way race

Poll source	Date administered	Democrat	%	Republican	%	Libertarian	%	Green	%	Lead margin	Sample size	Margin of error
CBS News/YouGov	August 30 – September 2, 2016	Hillary Clinton	46%	Donald Trump	42%	Gary Johnson	4%	Jill Stein	2%	4	1,088	± 4%
Emerson College	August 27–29, 2016	Hillary Clinton	43%	Donald Trump	45%	Gary Johnson	8%	Jill Stein	2%	2	800	± 3.4%
Gravis Marketing	August 15–17, 2016	Hillary Clinton	38%	Donald Trump	39%	Gary Johnson	10%	Jill Stein	2%	1	723	± 3.6%
NBC News/Wall Street Journal/Marist	August 4–10, 2016	Hillary Clinton	45%	Donald Trump	36%	Gary Johnson	9%	Jill Stein	2%	9	921	± 3.2%
Public Policy Polling	August 5–7, 2016	Hillary Clinton	43%	Donald Trump	41%	Gary Johnson	7%	Jill Stein	2%	2	830	± 3.4%
NBC News/Wall Street Journal/Marist	July 5–11, 2016	Hillary Clinton	42%	Donald Trump	36%	Gary Johnson	7%	Jill Stein	2%	6	907	± 3.3%
CBS News/YouGov	June 21–24, 2016	Hillary Clinton	44%	Donald Trump	42%	Gary Johnson	2%	Jill Stein	1%	2	988	± 4%
Public Policy Polling	June 20–21, 2016	Hillary Clinton	43%	Donald Trump	43%	Gary Johnson	4%	Jill Stein	2%	Tied	947	± 3.2%
Public Policy Polling	May 20–22, 2016	Hillary Clinton	41%	Donald Trump	43%	Gary Johnson	3%	Jill Stein	2%	2	928	3.2%
Public Policy Polling	May 20–22, 2016	Bernie Sanders	43%	Donald Trump	40%	Gary Johnson	3%	Jill Stein	2%	3	928	3.2%

== Ohio ==
18 electoral votes
(Democratic in 2008) 51%–47%
(Democratic in 2012) 51%–48%

Poll source	Date administered	Democrat	%	Republican	%	Lead margin	Sample size	Margin of error
Quinnipiac University	August 29 – September 7, 2016	Hillary Clinton	45%	Donald Trump	46%	1	775	± 3.5%
Public Policy Polling	August 26–27, 2016	Hillary Clinton	46%	Donald Trump	42%	4	1,134	± 2.9%
OnMessage	August 13–17, 2016	Hillary Clinton	45%	Donald Trump	45%	Tied	600	± 4.0%
NBC News/Wall Street Journal/Marist	August 3–7, 2016	Hillary Clinton	43%	Donald Trump	38%	5	889	± 3.1%
Quinnipiac University	July 30 – August 7, 2016	Hillary Clinton	49%	Donald Trump	45%	4	812	± 3.4%
Public Policy Polling	July 22–24, 2016	Hillary Clinton	45%	Donald Trump	45%	Tied	1,334	± 2.7%
Suffolk University	July 18–20, 2016	Hillary Clinton	44%	Donald Trump	44%	Tied	500	± 4.4%
Quinnipiac University	June 30 – July 11, 2016	Hillary Clinton	41%	Donald Trump	41%	Tied	955	± 3.2%
NBC News/Wall Street Journal/Marist	July 5–10, 2016	Hillary Clinton	39%	Donald Trump	39%	Tied	848	± 3.4%
Gravis Marketing/One America News	June 27–28, 2016	Hillary Clinton	46%	Donald Trump	47%	1	1,270	± 2.8%
Public Policy Polling	June 22–23, 2016	Hillary Clinton	44%	Donald Trump	40%	4	708	± 3.7%
Greenberg Quinlan Rosner	June 11–20, 2016	Hillary Clinton	47%	Donald Trump	48%	1	300	± 5.66%
Quinnipiac University	June 8–19, 2016	Hillary Clinton	40%	Donald Trump	40%	Tied	971	± 3.1%
Quinnipiac University	June 8–19, 2016	Bernie Sanders	48%	Donald Trump	38%	10	971	± 3.1%
Zogby Analytics	May 18–22, 2016	Hillary Clinton	45%	Donald Trump	39%	6	679	± 3.8%
CBS News/YouGov	May 16–19, 2016	Hillary Clinton	44%	Donald Trump	39%	5	992	± 3.7%
CBS News/YouGov	May 16–19, 2016	Bernie Sanders	48%	Donald Trump	39%	9	992	± 3.7%
Quinnipiac University	April 27 – May 8, 2016	Hillary Clinton	39%	Donald Trump	43%	4	1,042	± 3.0%
Quinnipiac University	April 27 – May 8, 2016	Bernie Sanders	44%	Donald Trump	42%	2	1,042	± 3.0%
Public Policy Polling	April 26–27, 2016	Hillary Clinton	45%	Donald Trump	42%	3	799	3.2%
Public Policy Polling	April 26–27, 2016	Hillary Clinton	44%	Ted Cruz	35%	9	799	3.2%
Public Policy Polling	April 26–27, 2016	Hillary Clinton	41%	John Kasich	43%	2	799	3.2%
Public Policy Polling	April 26–27, 2016	Bernie Sanders	45%	Donald Trump	41%	4	799	3.2%
Public Policy Polling	April 26–27, 2016	Bernie Sanders	44%	Ted Cruz	35%	9	799	3.2%
Public Policy Polling	April 26–27, 2016	Bernie Sanders	37%	John Kasich	47%	10	799	3.2%
NBC News/Wall Street Journal/Marist	March 4–10, 2016	Hillary Clinton	48%	Donald Trump	42%	6	2,052	± 2.2%
NBC News/Wall Street Journal/Marist	March 4–10, 2016	Hillary Clinton	45%	Ted Cruz	47%	2	2,052	± 2.2%
NBC News/Wall Street Journal/Marist	March 4–10, 2016	Hillary Clinton	36%	John Kasich	57%	21	2,052	± 2.2%
NBC News/Wall Street Journal/Marist	March 4–10, 2016	Bernie Sanders	50%	Donald Trump	41%	9	2,052	± 2.2%
NBC News/Wall Street Journal/Marist	March 4–10, 2016	Bernie Sanders	45%	Ted Cruz	44%	1	2,052	± 2.2%
Public Policy Polling	March 4–6, 2016	Hillary Clinton	45%	Ted Cruz	40%	5	1,248	2.8%
Public Policy Polling	March 4–6, 2016	Hillary Clinton	37%	John Kasich	52%	15	1,248	2.8%
Public Policy Polling	March 4–6, 2016	Hillary Clinton	44%	Marco Rubio	41%	3	1,248	2.8%
Public Policy Polling	March 4–6, 2016	Hillary Clinton	45%	Donald Trump	40%	5	1,248	2.8%
Public Policy Polling	March 4–6, 2016	Bernie Sanders	44%	Ted Cruz	38%	6	1,248	2.8%
Public Policy Polling	March 4–6, 2016	Bernie Sanders	34%	John Kasich	54%	20	1,248	2.8%
Public Policy Polling	March 4–6, 2016	Bernie Sanders	42%	Marco Rubio	38%	4	1,248	2.8%
Public Policy Polling	March 4–6, 2016	Bernie Sanders	44%	Donald Trump	40%	4	1,248	2.8%
CNN/ORC	March 2–6, 2016	Hillary Clinton	50%	Donald Trump	43%	7	884	3.5%
CNN/ORC	March 2–6, 2016	Hillary Clinton	48%	Marco Rubio	46%	2	884	3.5%
CNN/ORC	March 2–6, 2016	Hillary Clinton	51%	Ted Cruz	42%	9	884	3.5%
Quinnipiac University	February 16–20, 2016	Hillary Clinton	43%	Ted Cruz	46%	3	1,539	2.5%
Quinnipiac University	February 16–20, 2016	Hillary Clinton	37%	John Kasich	54%	17	1,539	2.5%
Quinnipiac University	February 16–20, 2016	Hillary Clinton	42%	Marco Rubio	47%	5	1,539	2.5%
Quinnipiac University	February 16–20, 2016	Hillary Clinton	42%	Donald Trump	44%	2	1,539	2.5%
Quinnipiac University	February 16–20, 2016	Bernie Sanders	44%	Ted Cruz	42%	2	1,539	2.5%
Quinnipiac University	February 16–20, 2016	Bernie Sanders	35%	John Kasich	54%	19	1,539	2.5%
Quinnipiac University	February 16–20, 2016	Bernie Sanders	42%	Marco Rubio	44%	2	1,539	2.5%
Quinnipiac University	February 16–20, 2016	Bernie Sanders	44%	Donald Trump	44%	Tied	1,539	2.5%

Three-way race

Poll source	Date administered	Democrat	%	Republican	%	Independent/ Third-party candidate	%	Lead margin	Sample size	Margin of error
Greenberg Quinlan Rosner	June 11–20, 2016	Hillary Clinton	41%	Donald Trump	41%	Gary Johnson	14%	Tied	300	± 5.66%
Public Policy Polling	March 4–6, 2016	Hillary Clinton	37%	Donald Trump	37%	Michael Bloomberg	15%	Tied	1,248	± 2.8%
Public Policy Polling	March 4–6, 2016	Bernie Sanders	38%	Donald Trump	37%	Michael Bloomberg	13%	1	1,248	± 2.8%
Quinnipiac University	February 16–20, 2016	Bernie Sanders	37%	Ted Cruz	37%	Michael Bloomberg	11%	Tied	1,539	± 2.5%
Quinnipiac University	February 16–20, 2016	Bernie Sanders	35%	Donald Trump	38%	Michael Bloomberg	13%	3	1,539	± 2.5%

Four-way race

Poll source	Date administered	Democrat	%	Republican	%	Libertarian	%	Green	%	Lead margin	Sample size	Margin of error
Quinnipiac University	August 29 – September 7, 2016	Hillary Clinton	37%	Donald Trump	41%	Gary Johnson	14%	Jill Stein	4%	4	775	± 3.5%
Emerson College	August 25–27, 2016	Hillary Clinton	43%	Donald Trump	43%	Gary Johnson	10%	Jill Stein	2%	Tied	800	± 3.4%
Monmouth University	August 18–21, 2016	Hillary Clinton	43%	Donald Trump	39%	Gary Johnson	10%	Jill Stein	<1%	4	402	± 4.9%
CBS News/YouGov	August 17–19, 2016	Hillary Clinton	46%	Donald Trump	40%	Gary Johnson	6%	Jill Stein	2%	6	997	± 3.9%
OnMessage	August 13–17, 2016	Hillary Clinton	42%	Donald Trump	42%	Gary Johnson	8%	Jill Stein	2%	Tied	600	± 4.0%
NBC News/Wall Street Journal/Marist	August 3–7, 2016	Hillary Clinton	39%	Donald Trump	35%	Gary Johnson	12%	Jill Stein	4%	4	889	± 3.1%
Quinnipiac University	July 30 – August 7, 2016	Hillary Clinton	44%	Donald Trump	42%	Gary Johnson	8%	Jill Stein	3%	2	812	± 3.4%
Public Policy Polling	July 22–24, 2016	Hillary Clinton	39%	Donald Trump	42%	Gary Johnson	6%	Jill Stein	2%	3	1,334	± 2.7%
Suffolk University	July 18–20, 2016	Hillary Clinton	43%	Donald Trump	39%	Gary Johnson	5%	Jill Stein	1%	4	500	± 4.4%
CBS News/YouGov	July 13–15, 2016	Hillary Clinton	44%	Donald Trump	40%	Gary Johnson	5%	Jill Stein	3%	4	1,104	± 3.5%
Quinnipiac University	June 30 – July 11, 2016	Hillary Clinton	36%	Donald Trump	37%	Gary Johnson	7%	Jill Stein	6%	1	955	± 3.2%
NBC News/Wall Street Journal/Marist	July 5–10, 2016	Hillary Clinton	38%	Donald Trump	35%	Gary Johnson	9%	Jill Stein	3%	3	848	± 3.4%
Quinnipiac University	June 8–19, 2016	Hillary Clinton	38%	Donald Trump	36%	Gary Johnson	8%	Jill Stein	3%	2	971	± 3.1%

== Oklahoma ==
7 electoral votes
(Republican in 2008) 66%–34%
(Republican in 2012) 67%–33%

Three-way race

Poll source	Date administered	Democrat	%	Republican	%	Independent/ Third-party candidate	%	Lead margin	Sample size	Margin of error
SoonerPoll	July 20–25, 2016	Hillary Clinton	29%	Donald Trump	53%	Gary Johnson	7%	24	298	± 4.91%
Cole Hargrave	May 2–4, 2016	Hillary Clinton	28%	Donald Trump	48%	Gary Johnson	6%	20	500	± 4.3%

== Oregon ==
7 electoral votes
(Democratic in 2008) 57%–40%
(Democratic in 2012) 54%–42%

Poll source	Date administered	Democrat	%	Republican	%	Lead margin	Sample size	Margin of error
Portland Tribune/iCitizen	June 23–27, 2016	Hillary Clinton	46%	Donald Trump	32%	14	555	± 4.0%
Clout Research	May 10–13, 2016	Hillary Clinton	42%	Donald Trump	44%	2	657	± 3.82%
DHM Research	May 6–9, 2016	Hillary Clinton	43%	Donald Trump	32%	11	901	± 3.3%

Four-way race

Poll source	Date administered	Democrat	%	Republican	%	Libertarian	%	Green	%	Lead margin	Sample size	Margin of error
Clout Research	July 9–13, 2016	Hillary Clinton	43%	Donald Trump	40%	Gary Johnson	6%	Jill Stein	3%	3	701	± 3.7%

== Pennsylvania ==
20 electoral votes
(Democratic in 2008) 54%–44%
(Democratic in 2012) 52%–47%

Poll source	Date administered	Democrat	%	Republican	%	Lead margin	Sample size	Margin of error
Quinnipiac University	August 29 – September 7, 2016	Hillary Clinton	48%	Donald Trump	43%	5	778	± 3.5%
Public Policy Polling	August 30–31, 2016	Hillary Clinton	47%	Donald Trump	42%	5	814	± 3.4%
GBA Strategies	August 21–28, 2016	Hillary Clinton	48%	Donald Trump	43%	5	1,200	± 4.4%
Public Policy Polling	August 26–27, 2016	Hillary Clinton	48%	Donald Trump	43%	5	1,194	± %
Franklin & Marshall College	August 25–29, 2016	Hillary Clinton	47%	Donald Trump	40%	7	496	± 5.6%
NBC News/Wall Street Journal/Marist	August 3–7, 2016	Hillary Clinton	48%	Donald Trump	37%	11	834	± 3.1%
Quinnipiac University	July 30 – August 7, 2016	Hillary Clinton	52%	Donald Trump	42%	10	815	± 3.4%
Susquehanna/ABC27 News	July 31 – August 4, 2016	Hillary Clinton	47%	Donald Trump	37%	10	772	± 3.53%
Franklin & Marshall College	July 29 – August 2, 2016	Hillary Clinton	49%	Donald Trump	38%	11	389	± 6.3%
Public Policy Polling	July 29–31, 2016	Hillary Clinton	49%	Donald Trump	45%	4	1,505	± 2.5%
Suffolk University	July 25–27, 2016	Hillary Clinton	50%	Donald Trump	41%	9	500	± 4.4%
Quinnipiac University	June 30 – July 11, 2016	Hillary Clinton	41%	Donald Trump	43%	2	982	± 3.1%
NBC News/Wall Street Journal/Marist	July 5–10, 2016	Hillary Clinton	45%	Donald Trump	36%	9	829	± 3.4%
Gravis Marketing/One America News Network	June 27–28, 2016	Hillary Clinton	48%	Donald Trump	47%	1	1,958	± 2.2%
Public Policy Polling	June 22–23, 2016	Hillary Clinton	46%	Donald Trump	42%	4	980	± 3.1%
Quinnipiac University	June 8–19, 2016	Hillary Clinton	42%	Donald Trump	41%	1	950	± 3.2%
Quinnipiac University	June 8–19, 2016	Bernie Sanders	47%	Donald Trump	40%	7	950	± 3.2%
Public Policy Polling	June 3–5, 2016	Hillary Clinton	44%	Donald Trump	44%	Tied	1,106	± 3.0%
Public Policy Polling	June 3–5, 2016	Bernie Sanders	51%	Donald Trump	39%	12	1,106	± 3.0%
Quinnipiac University	April 27 – May 8, 2016	Hillary Clinton	43%	Donald Trump	42%	1	1,077	± 3.0%
Quinnipiac University	April 27 – May 8, 2016	Bernie Sanders	47%	Donald Trump	41%	6	1,077	± 3.0%
NBC News/Wall Street Journal/Marist	April 18–20, 2016	Hillary Clinton	54%	Donald Trump	39%	15	2,606	± 1.9%
NBC News/Wall Street Journal/Marist	April 18–20, 2016	Hillary Clinton	52%	Ted Cruz	41%	11	2,606	± 1.9%
NBC News/Wall Street Journal/Marist	April 18–20, 2016	Hillary Clinton	45%	John Kasich	48%	3	2,606	± 1.9%
NBC News/Wall Street Journal/Marist	April 18–20, 2016	Bernie Sanders	57%	Donald Trump	37%	20	2,606	± 1.9%
NBC News/Wall Street Journal/Marist	April 18–20, 2016	Bernie Sanders	58%	Ted Cruz	36%	22	2,606	± 1.9%
NBC News/Wall Street Journal/Marist	April 18–20, 2016	Bernie Sanders	50%	John Kasich	44%	6	2,606	± 1.9%
Fox News	April 4–7, 2016	Hillary Clinton	44%	Donald Trump	44%	Tied	1,607	± 2.5%
Quinnipiac University	March 30 – April 4, 2016	Hillary Clinton	45%	Donald Trump	42%	3	1,737	± 2.4%
Quinnipiac University	March 30 – April 4, 2016	Hillary Clinton	43%	Ted Cruz	43%	Tied	1,737	± 2.4%
Quinnipiac University	March 30 – April 4, 2016	Hillary Clinton	35%	John Kasich	51%	16	1,737	± 2.4%
Quinnipiac University	March 30 – April 4, 2016	Bernie Sanders	48%	Donald Trump	40%	8	1,737	± 2.4%
Quinnipiac University	March 30 – April 4, 2016	Bernie Sanders	46%	Ted Cruz	38%	8	1,737	± 2.4%
Quinnipiac University	March 30 – April 4, 2016	Bernie Sanders	40%	John Kasich	46%	6	1,737	± 2.4%
Franklin & Marshall College	March 14–20, 2016	Hillary Clinton	46%	Donald Trump	33%	13	828	± 3.3%
Franklin & Marshall College	March 14–20, 2016	Hillary Clinton	45%	Ted Cruz	35%	10	828	± 3.3%
Mercyhurst University	March 1–11, 2016	Hillary Clinton	43%	Donald Trump	35%	8	421	± 4.8%
Mercyhurst University	March 1–11, 2016	Hillary Clinton	45%	Ted Cruz	42%	3	421	± 4.8%
Mercyhurst University	March 1–11, 2016	Hillary Clinton	36%	John Kasich	49%	13	421	± 4.8%
Mercyhurst University	March 1–11, 2016	Hillary Clinton	39%	Marco Rubio	47%	8	421	± 4.8%
Mercyhurst University	March 1–11, 2016	Bernie Sanders	49%	Donald Trump	37%	12	421	± 4.8%
Mercyhurst University	March 1–11, 2016	Bernie Sanders	48%	Ted Cruz	40%	8	421	± 4.8%
Mercyhurst University	March 1–11, 2016	Bernie Sanders	42%	John Kasich	46%	4	421	± 4.8%
Mercyhurst University	March 1–11, 2016	Bernie Sanders	41%	Marco Rubio	46%	5	421	± 4.8%
Harper Polling	March 1–2, 2016	Hillary Clinton	45%	Donald Trump	40%	5	662	± 3.75%
Harper Polling	March 1–2, 2016	Hillary Clinton	46%	Marco Rubio	40%	6	662	± 3.75%
Harper Polling	March 1–2, 2016	Hillary Clinton	48%	Ted Cruz	37%	11	662	± 3.75%

Three-way race

Poll source	Date administered	Democrat	%	Republican	%	Libertarian	%	Lead margin	Sample size	Margin of error
GBA Strategies	August 21–28, 2016	Hillary Clinton	46%	Donald Trump	40%	Gary Johnson	10%	6	1,200	± 4.4%
Greenberg Quinlan Rosner	June 11–20, 2016	Hillary Clinton	45%	Donald Trump	36%	Gary Johnson	13%	9	300	± 5.66%

Four-way race

Poll source	Date administered	Democrat	%	Republican	%	Libertarian	%	Green	%	Lead margin	Sample size	Margin of error
Quinnipiac University	August 29 – September 7, 2016	Hillary Clinton	44%	Donald Trump	39%	Gary Johnson	9%	Jill Stein	3%	5	778	± 3.5%
CBS News/YouGov	August 30 – September 2, 2016	Hillary Clinton	45%	Donald Trump	37%	Gary Johnson	6%	Jill Stein	2%	8	1,091	± 4.1%
Monmouth University	August 26–29, 2016	Hillary Clinton	48%	Donald Trump	40%	Gary Johnson	6%	Jill Stein	1%	8	402	± 4.9%
Franklin & Marshall College	August 25–29, 2016	Hillary Clinton	41%	Donald Trump	38%	Gary Johnson	7%	Jill Stein	2%	3	736	± 4.6%
Emerson College	August 25–28, 2016	Hillary Clinton	46%	Donald Trump	43%	Gary Johnson	7%	Jill Stein	2%	3	800	± 3.4%
NBC News/Wall Street Journal/Marist	August 3–7, 2016	Hillary Clinton	45%	Donald Trump	36%	Gary Johnson	9%	Jill Stein	3%	9	834	± 3.1%
Quinnipiac University	July 30 – August 7, 2016	Hillary Clinton	48%	Donald Trump	39%	Gary Johnson	7%	Jill Stein	3%	9	815	± 3.4%
Susquehanna/ABC27 News	July 31 – August 4, 2016	Hillary Clinton	46%	Donald Trump	37%	Gary Johnson	7%	Jill Stein	3%	9	772	± 3.53%
Franklin & Marshall College	July 29 – August 2, 2016	Hillary Clinton	47%	Donald Trump	34%	Gary Johnson	7%	Jill Stein	3%	13	496	± 6.1%
Public Policy Polling	July 29–31, 2016	Hillary Clinton	45%	Donald Trump	42%	Gary Johnson	4%	Jill Stein	2%	3	1,505	± 2.5%
Suffolk University	July 25–27, 2016	Hillary Clinton	46%	Donald Trump	37%	Gary Johnson	5%	Jill Stein	3%	9	500	± 4.4%
Quinnipiac University	June 30 – July 11, 2016	Hillary Clinton	34%	Donald Trump	40%	Gary Johnson	9%	Jill Stein	3%	6	982	± 3.1%
NBC News/Wall Street Journal/Marist	July 5–10, 2016	Hillary Clinton	43%	Donald Trump	35%	Gary Johnson	8%	Jill Stein	2%	8	829	± 3.4%
Quinnipiac University	June 8–19, 2016	Hillary Clinton	39%	Donald Trump	36%	Gary Johnson	9%	Jill Stein	4%	3	950	± 3.2%
Public Policy Polling	June 3–5, 2016	Hillary Clinton	41%	Donald Trump	40%	Gary Johnson	6%	Jill Stein	3%	1	1,106	± 3.0%
Public Policy Polling	June 3–5, 2016	Bernie Sanders	45%	Donald Trump	36%	Gary Johnson	5%	Jill Stein	1%	9	1,106	± 3.0%

== South Carolina ==
9 electoral votes
(Republican in 2008) 54%–45%
(Republican in 2012) 55%–44%

Poll source	Date administered	Democrat	%	Republican	%	Lead margin	Sample size	Margin of error
Feldman	August 18–21, 2016	Hillary Clinton	43%	Donald Trump	45%	2	600	± 4%
Gravis Marketing	August 15–17, 2016	Hillary Clinton	42%	Donald Trump	46%	4	768	± 3.5%

Four-way race

Poll source	Date administered	Democrat	%	Republican	%	Libertarian	%	Green	%	Lead margin	Sample size	Margin of error
First Tuesday Strategies	August 30 – September 2, 2016	Hillary Clinton	38%	Donald Trump	50%	Gary Johnson	3%	Jill Stein	1%	12	775	± 3.5%
Feldman	August 18–21, 2016	Hillary Clinton	39%	Donald Trump	39%	Gary Johnson	5%	Jill Stein	1%	Tied	600	± 4%
Gravis Marketing	August 15–17, 2016	Hillary Clinton	37%	Donald Trump	41%	Gary Johnson	7%	Jill Stein	3%	4	768	± 3.5%
Public Policy Polling	August 9–10, 2016	Hillary Clinton	39%	Donald Trump	41%	Gary Johnson	5%	Jill Stein	2%	2	1,290	± 2.7%

== Tennessee ==
11 electoral votes
(Republican in 2008) 57%–42%
(Republican in 2012) 59%–39%

Poll source	Date administered	Democrat	%	Republican	%	Lead margin	Sample size	Margin of error
iCitizen	July 25–27, 2016	Hillary Clinton	33%	Donald Trump	49%	16	655	± N/A%
Vanderbilt University/PSRA	April 25 – May 11, 2016	Hillary Clinton	35%	Donald Trump	44%	9	1,001	± 4.2%
Vanderbilt University/PSRA	April 25 – May 11, 2016	Hillary Clinton	34%	Ted Cruz	44%	10	1,001	± 4.2%

== Texas ==
38 electoral votes
(Republican in 2008) 55%–44%
(Republican in 2012) 57%–41%

Poll source	Date administered	Democrat	%	Republican	%	Lead margin	Sample size	Margin of error
Public Policy Polling	August 12–14, 2016	Hillary Clinton	44%	Donald Trump	50%	6	944	± 3.2%
KTVT-CBS 11/Dixie Strategies Poll	August 8–9, 2016	Hillary Clinton	35%	Donald Trump	46%	11	1,018	± 3.1%
Texas Tribune/YouGov	June 10–19, 2016	Hillary Clinton	33%	Donald Trump	41%	8	1,200	± 2.83%
SurveyUSA	February 21–22, 2016	Hillary Clinton	44%	Donald Trump	47%	3	1,289	± 3%
SurveyUSA	February 21–22, 2016	Bernie Sanders	44%	Donald Trump	47%	3	1,289	± 3%
SurveyUSA	February 21–22, 2016	Hillary Clinton	42%	Ted Cruz	50%	8	1,289	± 3%
SurveyUSA	February 21–22, 2016	Bernie Sanders	41%	Ted Cruz	50%	9	1,289	± 3%
SurveyUSA	February 21–22, 2016	Hillary Clinton	41%	Marco Rubio	51%	10	1,289	± 3%
SurveyUSA	February 21–22, 2016	Bernie Sanders	40%	Marco Rubio	50%	10	1,289	± 3%

Three-way race

Poll source	Date administered	Democrat	%	Republican	%	Libertarian	%	Lead margin	Sample size	Margin of error
Texas Tribune/YouGov	June 10–20, 2016	Hillary Clinton	32%	Donald Trump	39%	Gary Johnson	7%	7	1,200	± 2.83%
Leland Beatty	June 13–14, 2016	Hillary Clinton	30%	Donald Trump	37%	Gary Johnson	3%	7	998	± 3.1%

Five-way race

Poll source	Date administered	Democrat	%	Republican	%	Libertarian	%	Green	%	Independent	%	Lead margin	Sample size	Margin of error
Public Policy Polling	August 12–14, 2016	Hillary Clinton	38%	Donald Trump	44%	Gary Johnson	6%	Jill Stein	2%	Evan McMullin	0%	6	944	± 3.2%

== Utah ==
6 electoral votes
(Republican in 2008) 62%–34%
(Republican in 2012) 73%–25%

Poll source	Date administered	Democrat	%	Republican	%	Lead margin	Sample size	Margin of error
Public Policy Polling	August 19–21, 2016	Hillary Clinton	33%	Donald Trump	53%	20	1,018	± 3.1%
Gravis Marketing	May 31 – June 1, 2016	Hillary Clinton	29%	Donald Trump	36%	7	1,519	± 2.5%
Dan Jones & Associates	May 2–10, 2016	Hillary Clinton	30%	Donald Trump	43%	13	588	± 4.04%
Dan Jones & Associates	May 2–10, 2016	Bernie Sanders	37%	Donald Trump	43%	6	588	± 4.04%
Dan Jones & Associates	March 23 – April 5, 2016	Hillary Clinton	38%	Donald Trump	38%	Tied	600	± 4.0%
Dan Jones & Associates	March 23 – April 5, 2016	Hillary Clinton	26%	Ted Cruz	67%	41	600	± 4.0%
Dan Jones & Associates	March 23 – April 5, 2016	Hillary Clinton	23%	John Kasich	68%	45	600	± 4.0%
Dan Jones & Associates	March 23 – April 5, 2016	Bernie Sanders	49%	Donald Trump	35%	14	600	± 4.0%
Dan Jones & Associates	March 23 – April 5, 2016	Bernie Sanders	32%	Ted Cruz	63%	31	600	± 4.0%
Dan Jones & Associates	March 23 – April 5, 2016	Bernie Sanders	30%	John Kasich	64%	34	600	± 4.0%
Dan Jones & Associates	March 8–15, 2016	Hillary Clinton	38%	Donald Trump	36%	2	500	± 4.38%
Dan Jones & Associates	March 8–15, 2016	Hillary Clinton	32%	Ted Cruz	60%	28	500	± 4.38%
Dan Jones & Associates	March 8–15, 2016	Hillary Clinton	29%	John Kasich	59%	30	500	± 4.38%
Dan Jones & Associates	March 8–15, 2016	Bernie Sanders	48%	Donald Trump	37%	11	500	± 4.38%
Dan Jones & Associates	March 8–15, 2016	Bernie Sanders	39%	Ted Cruz	53%	14	500	± 4.38%
Dan Jones & Associates	March 8–15, 2016	Bernie Sanders	35%	John Kasich	54%	19	500	± 4.38%

Three-way race

Poll source	Date administered	Democrat	%	Republican	%	Libertarian	%	Lead margin	Sample size	Margin of error
SurveyUSA/Salt Lake Tribune	June 2–8, 2016	Hillary Clinton	35%	Donald Trump	35%	Gary Johnson	13%	Tied	1,238	± 2.8%
SurveyUSA/Salt Lake Tribune	June 2–8, 2016	Bernie Sanders	37%	Donald Trump	35%	Gary Johnson	12%	2	1,238	± 2.8%
Gravis Marketing	May 31 – June 1, 2016	Hillary Clinton	26%	Donald Trump	29%	Gary Johnson	16%	3	1,519	± 2.5%

Four-way race

Poll source	Date administered	Democrat	%	Republican	%	Libertarian	%	Green	%	Lead margin	Sample size	Margin of error
Dan Jones & Associates	July 18 – August 4, 2016	Hillary Clinton	25%	Donald Trump	37%	Gary Johnson	16%	Jill Stein	1%	12	858	± 3.34%
Dan Jones & Associates	June 8–17, 2016	Hillary Clinton	27%	Donald Trump	36%	Gary Johnson	10%	Jill Stein	2%	9	614	± 3.95%

Six-way race

Poll source	Date administered	Democrat	%	Republican	%	Libertarian	%	Green	%	Constitution	%	Independent	%	Lead margin	Sample size	Margin of error
Public Policy Polling	August 19–21, 2016	Hillary Clinton	24%	Donald Trump	39%	Gary Johnson	12%	Jill Stein	5%	Darrell Castle	2%	Evan McMullin	9%	15	1,018	± 3.1%

== Vermont ==
3 electoral votes
(Democratic in 2008) 67%–30%
(Democratic in 2012) 67%–31%

Three-way race

Poll source	Date administered	Democrat	%	Republican	%	Libertarian	%	Lead margin	Sample size	Margin of error
VPR	July 11–23, 2016	Hillary Clinton	39%	Donald Trump	17%	Gary Johnson	5%	22	637	±3.9%
FM3 Research	June 27 – July 1, 2016	Hillary Clinton	39%	Donald Trump	24%	Gary Johnson	10%	15	600	± ?%

== Virginia ==
13 electoral votes
(Democratic in 2008) 53%–46%
(Democratic in 2012) 51%–47%

Poll source	Date administered	Democrat	%	Republican	%	Lead margin	Sample size	Margin of error
Hampton University	August 24–28, 2016	Hillary Clinton	43%	Donald Trump	41%	2	801	± 4.7%
Roanoke College	August 7–17, 2016	Hillary Clinton	55%	Donald Trump	36%	19	803	± 3.5%
Quinnipiac University	August 9–16, 2016	Hillary Clinton	50%	Donald Trump	38%	12	808	± 3.5%
Washington Post	August 11–14, 2016	Hillary Clinton	51%	Donald Trump	43%	8	707	± 4.5%
NBC News/Wall Street Journal/Marist	August 4–10, 2016	Hillary Clinton	46%	Donald Trump	33%	13	897	± 3.3%
RABA Research	July 26–27, 2016	Hillary Clinton	42%	Donald Trump	46%	4	655	± 3.8%
Fox News	July 9–12, 2016	Hillary Clinton	44%	Donald Trump	37%	7	601	± 4.0%
NBC News/Wall Street Journal/Marist	July 5–11, 2016	Hillary Clinton	44%	Donald Trump	35%	9	876	± 3.3%
Hampton University	July 6–10, 2016	Hillary Clinton	39%	Donald Trump	39%	Tied	805	± 4.6%
Public Policy Polling	June 13–15, 2016	Hillary Clinton	48%	Donald Trump	45%	3	1,032	± 3.1%
Gravis Marketing	May 24, 2016	Hillary Clinton	45%	Donald Trump	41%	4	1,728	± 2%
Roanoke College	May 9–17, 2016	Hillary Clinton	38%	Donald Trump	38%	Tied	610	± 4.0%
Christopher Newport University	March 23 – April 3, 2016	Hillary Clinton	44%	Donald Trump	35%	9	1,167	± 3.1%
Roanoke College	January 18–26, 2016	Hillary Clinton	52%	Donald Trump	35%	17	524	± 4.3%
Roanoke College	January 18–26, 2016	Hillary Clinton	46%	Marco Rubio	43%	3	524	± 4.3%
Roanoke College	January 18–26, 2016	Hillary Clinton	45%	Ted Cruz	41%	4	524	± 4.3%
Roanoke College	January 18–26, 2016	Bernie Sanders	55%	Donald Trump	33%	22	524	± 4.3%
Roanoke College	January 18–26, 2016	Bernie Sanders	48%	Marco Rubio	38%	10	524	± 4.3%
Roanoke College	January 18–26, 2016	Bernie Sanders	49%	Ted Cruz	37%	12	524	± 4.3%

Three-way race

Poll source	Date administered	Democrat	%	Republican	%	Independent/ Third-party candidate	%	Lead margin	Sample size	Margin of error
CBS News/YouGov	August 2–5, 2016	Hillary Clinton	49%	Donald Trump	37%	Gary Johnson	7%	12	1,181	± 3.7%
Gravis Marketing	May 24, 2016	Hillary Clinton	44%	Donald Trump	38%	Gary Johnson	6%	6	1,728	± 2%

Four-way race

Poll source	Date administered	Democrat	%	Republican	%	Libertarian	%	Green	%	Lead margin	Sample size	Margin of error
Emerson College	August 30 – September 1, 2016	Hillary Clinton	44%	Donald Trump	43%	Gary Johnson	11%	Jill Stein	3%	1	800	± 3.4%
Roanoke College	August 7–17, 2016	Hillary Clinton	48%	Donald Trump	32%	Gary Johnson	8%	Jill Stein	3%	16	803	± 3.5%
Quinnipiac University	August 9–16, 2016	Hillary Clinton	45%	Donald Trump	34%	Gary Johnson	11%	Jill Stein	5%	11	808	± 3.5%
Washington Post	August 11–14, 2016	Hillary Clinton	46%	Donald Trump	39%	Gary Johnson	9%	Jill Stein	3%	7	707	± 4.5%
NBC News/Wall Street Journal/Marist	August 4–10, 2016	Hillary Clinton	43%	Donald Trump	31%	Gary Johnson	9%	Jill Stein	5%	12	897	± 3.3%
Fox News	July 9–12, 2016	Hillary Clinton	39%	Donald Trump	34%	Gary Johnson	10%	Jill Stein	4%	5	601	± 4.0%
NBC News/Wall Street Journal/Marist	July 5–11, 2016	Hillary Clinton	41%	Donald Trump	34%	Gary Johnson	10%	Jill Stein	2%	7	876	± 3.3%
Public Policy Polling	June 13–15, 2016	Hillary Clinton	42%	Donald Trump	39%	Gary Johnson	6%	Jill Stein	2%	3	1,032	± 3.1%

== Washington ==
12 electoral votes
(Democratic in 2008) 57%–40%
(Democratic in 2012) 56%–41%

Four-way race

Poll source	Date administered	Democrat	%	Republican	%	Libertarian	%	Green	%	Lead margin	Sample size	Margin of error
Elway Poll	August 9–13, 2016	Hillary Clinton	43%	Donald Trump	24%	Gary Johnson	7%	Jill Stein	4%	19	500	± 4.5%

== West Virginia ==
5 electoral votes
(Republican in 2008) 56%–43%
(Republican in 2012) 62%–36%

Poll source	Date administered	Democrat	%	Republican	%	Lead margin	Sample size	Margin of error
Public Policy Polling	April 29 – May 1, 2016	Hillary Clinton	30%	Donald Trump	57%	27	1,201	± 2.8%
Public Policy Polling	April 29 – May 1, 2016	Hillary Clinton	31%	Ted Cruz	44%	13	1,201	± 2.8%
Public Policy Polling	April 29 – May 1, 2016	Hillary Clinton	27%	John Kasich	52%	25	1,201	± 2.8%
Public Policy Polling	April 29 – May 1, 2016	Bernie Sanders	35%	Donald Trump	56%	21	1,201	± 2.8%
Public Policy Polling	April 29 – May 1, 2016	Bernie Sanders	39%	Ted Cruz	40%	1	1,201	± 2.8%
Public Policy Polling	April 29 – May 1, 2016	Bernie Sanders	31%	John Kasich	48%	17	1,201	± 2.8%

Four-way race

Poll source	Date administered	Democrat	%	Republican	%	Libertarian	%	Green Party	%	Lead margin	Sample size	Margin of error
Repass Research	August 9–28, 2016	Hillary Clinton	31%	Donald Trump	49%	Gary Johnson	10%	Jill Stein	4%	18	386	4.7%

== Wisconsin ==
10 electoral votes
(Democratic in 2008) 56%–42%
(Democratic in 2012) 53%–46%

Poll source	Date administered	Democrat	%	Republican	%	Lead margin	Sample size	Margin of error
Public Policy Polling	August 26–27, 2016	Hillary Clinton	48%	Donald Trump	41%	7	1,054	
Marquette University	August 25–28, 2016	Hillary Clinton	45%	Donald Trump	42%	3	615	± 5.0%
Marquette University	August 4–7, 2016	Hillary Clinton	46%	Donald Trump	36%	10	805	± 4.6%
Marquette University	July 7–10, 2016	Hillary Clinton	45%	Donald Trump	41%	4	629	± 4.5%
Public Policy Polling	June 22–23, 2016	Hillary Clinton	47%	Donald Trump	39%	8	843	± 3.4%
Greenberg Quinlan Rosner	June 11–20, 2016	Hillary Clinton	47%	Donald Trump	36%	11	300	± 5.66%
Marquette University	June 9–12, 2016	Hillary Clinton	46%	Donald Trump	37%	9	666	± 4.9%
Marquette University	June 9–12, 2016	Bernie Sanders	57%	Donald Trump	33%	24	666	± 4.9%
Public Opinion Strategies	May 10–12, 2016	Hillary Clinton	43%	Donald Trump	31%	12	600	± 4.0%
St. Norbert College/WPR/WPT	April 12–15, 2016	Hillary Clinton	46%	Donald Trump	34%	12	616	± 4%
St. Norbert College/WPR/WPT	April 12–15, 2016	Hillary Clinton	45%	Ted Cruz	44%	1	616	± 4%
St. Norbert College/WPR/WPT	April 12–15, 2016	Bernie Sanders	52%	Donald Trump	33%	19	616	± 4%
St. Norbert College/WPR/WPT	April 12–15, 2016	Bernie Sanders	50%	Ted Cruz	40%	10	616	± 4%
Emerson College	March 30 – April 3, 2016	Hillary Clinton	47%	Donald Trump	37%	10	1,198	± 2.8%
Emerson College	March 30 – April 3, 2016	Hillary Clinton	46%	Ted Cruz	43%	3	1,198	± 2.8%
Emerson College	March 30 – April 3, 2016	Hillary Clinton	38%	John Kasich	52%	14	1,198	± 2.8%
Emerson College	March 30 – April 3, 2016	Bernie Sanders	51%	Donald Trump	37%	14	1,198	± 2.8%
Emerson College	March 30 – April 3, 2016	Bernie Sanders	50%	Ted Cruz	41%	9	1,198	± 2.8%
Fox News	March 28–30, 2016	Hillary Clinton	49%	Donald Trump	35%	14	1,602	± 2.5%
Marquette University	March 24–28, 2016	Hillary Clinton	47%	Donald Trump	37%	10	1,405	± 3.3%
Marquette University	March 24–28, 2016	Hillary Clinton	44%	Ted Cruz	44%	Tied	1,405	± 3.3%
Marquette University	March 24–28, 2016	Hillary Clinton	39%	John Kasich	48%	9	1,405	± 3.3%
Marquette University	March 24–28, 2016	Bernie Sanders	54%	Donald Trump	35%	19	1,405	± 3.3%
Marquette University	March 24–28, 2016	Bernie Sanders	52%	Ted Cruz	39%	13	1,405	± 3.3%
Marquette University	March 24–28, 2016	Bernie Sanders	46%	John Kasich	44%	2	1,405	± 3.3%
Emerson College	March 20–22, 2016	Hillary Clinton	47%	Donald Trump	38%	9	922	± 3.2%
Emerson College	March 20–22, 2016	Hillary Clinton	46%	Ted Cruz	45%	1	922	± 3.2%
Emerson College	March 20–22, 2016	Bernie Sanders	47%	Donald Trump	39%	9	922	± 3.2%
Marquette University	February 18–21, 2016	Hillary Clinton	47%	Donald Trump	37%	10	802	± 4.5%
Marquette University	February 18–21, 2016	Hillary Clinton	43%	Ted Cruz	43%	Tied	802	± 4.5%
Marquette University	February 18–21, 2016	Hillary Clinton	44%	Marco Rubio	43%	1	802	± 4.5%
Marquette University	February 18–21, 2016	Bernie Sanders	54%	Donald Trump	34%	20	802	± 4.5%
Marquette University	February 18–21, 2016	Bernie Sanders	53%	Ted Cruz	35%	18	802	± 4.5%
Marquette University	February 18–21, 2016	Bernie Sanders	53%	Marco Rubio	35%	18	802	± 4.5%
Marquette University	January 21–24, 2016	Hillary Clinton	47%	Donald Trump	38%	9	806	± 4.0%
Marquette University	January 21–24, 2016	Hillary Clinton	45%	Marco Rubio	44%	1	806	± 4.0%
Marquette University	January 21–24, 2016	Hillary Clinton	45%	Ted Cruz	44%	1	806	± 4.0%
Marquette University	January 21–24, 2016	Bernie Sanders	52%	Donald Trump	34%	18	806	± 4.0%
Marquette University	January 21–24, 2016	Bernie Sanders	49%	Marco Rubio	38%	11	806	± 4.0%
Marquette University	January 21–24, 2016	Bernie Sanders	50%	Ted Cruz	38%	12	806	± 4.0%

Three-way race

Poll source	Date administered	Democrat	%	Republican	%	Libertarian	%	Lead margin	Sample size	Margin of error
Greenberg Quinlan Rosner	June 11–20, 2016	Hillary Clinton	44%	Donald Trump	32%	Gary Johnson	16%	12	300	± 5.66%

Four-way race

Poll source	Date administered	Democrat	%	Republican	%	Libertarian	%	Green	%	Lead margin	Sample size	Margin of error
Monmouth University	August 27–30, 2016	Hillary Clinton	43%	Donald Trump	38%	Gary Johnson	7%	Jill Stein	3%	5	404	± 4.9%
Marquette University	August 25–28, 2016	Hillary Clinton	41%	Donald Trump	38%	Gary Johnson	10%	Jill Stein	4%	3	615	± 5.0%
Marquette University	August 4–7, 2016	Hillary Clinton	42%	Donald Trump	33%	Gary Johnson	10%	Jill Stein	4%	9	805	± 4.6%
Marquette University	July 7–10, 2016	Hillary Clinton	43%	Donald Trump	37%	Gary Johnson	8%	Jill Stein	2%	6	629	± 4.5%
CBS News/YouGov	June 21–24, 2016	Hillary Clinton	41%	Donald Trump	36%	Gary Johnson	3%	Jill Stein	2%	5	993	± 4.3%

== See also ==
- Pre-2016 statewide opinion polling for the 2016 United States presidential election
- Statewide opinion polling for the 2016 United States presidential election
