= 2008 Maryland Democratic presidential primary =

- February 12, 2008

Candidate	Barack Obama	Hillary Clinton
Home state	Illinois	New York
Delegate count	42	28
Popular vote	532,665	314,211
Percentage	60.66%	35.78%
- Primary results by county Obama: 40–50% 50–60% 60–70% 70–80% Clinton: 40–50% 50–60%

The 2008 Maryland Democratic presidential primary took place on February 12, 2008. Nicknamed the "Potomac Primary" or the "Chesapeake Primary" because the District of Columbia and Virginia also held their primaries that day (and all three border the Potomac River), a total of 70 delegates were up for grabs in Maryland. The winner in each of Maryland's eight congressional districts was awarded all of that district's delegates, totaling 46. Another 24 delegates were awarded to the statewide winner, Barack Obama. The 70 delegates represented Maryland at the Democratic National Convention in Denver, Colorado. Twenty-nine other unpledged delegates, known as superdelegates, also attended the convention and cast their votes as well.

By order of a judge, the polling places in the Maryland Democratic Primary were extended to 9:30 p.m. EST in order to compensate for voters who were delayed in traffic by inclement weather. The same day, an intense ice storm brought .25 inches-1 inch of ice accumulations across Maryland.

== Results ==
2008 Maryland Democratic Presidential Primary Results
Party	Candidate	Votes	Percentage	Delegates
Democratic	Barack Obama	532,665	60.66%	42
Democratic	Hillary Clinton	314,211	35.78%	28
Democratic	Uncommitted	11,417	1.30%	0
Democratic	John Edwards	10,506	1.20%	0
Democratic	Joe Biden	3,776	0.43%	0
Democratic	Bill Richardson	2,098	0.24%	0
Democratic	Dennis Kucinich	1,909	0.22%	0
Democratic	Mike Gravel	804	0.09%	0
Democratic	Christopher Dodd	788	0.09%	0
Totals		878,174	100.00%	70
Voter turnout		%		—

== Analysis ==
With its significant African American population and high concentration of highly educated and highly affluent white progressive/liberal professionals, Maryland was a state that was very favorable for Barack Obama coming out of Super Tuesday. According to exit polls, 53 percent of voters in the Maryland Democratic Primary were white and they opted for Clinton by a margin of 52-42 compared to the 37 percent of African American voters who backed Obama by a margin of 84-15. Hispanics/Latinos, which comprised 4 percent of the electorate, supported Clinton by a margin of 55-45. Obama swept all age groups, socioeconomic/income classes and educational attainment categories in Maryland as well. Of the 84 percent of self-identified Democrats who voted in the primary, 59 percent backed Obama while 40 percent supported Clinton; Independents, which made up 13 percent of the voters, also backed Obama by a 62-27 margin. Obama also won all ideological groups. Regarding religion, Obama won Protestants by a margin of 51-44 percent, other Christians by a margin of 74-21, other religions by a margin of 61-39, and atheists/agnostics by a margin of 62-37; Clinton won Roman Catholics by a margin of 48-45 and Jews by a margin of 60-40 percent.

Obama performed extremely well in the more urban parts of the state in and around Baltimore and the Washington, D.C. suburbs while Clinton performed strongly in the more rural parts of the state like the Eastern Shore and Western Maryland, which takes in parts of Appalachia.

Although Clinton received two big endorsements from Governor Martin O’Malley and U.S. Senator Barbara Mikulski, it was not enough to help her much in the state, as many of the demographics were largely in Barack Obama’s favor. Obama received the endorsement of junior senator Ben Cardin

2008 Maryland Democratic presidential primary
Demographic subgroup	Obama	Clinton	% of total vote
Total vote	61	36	100
Sex by race
White men	48	45	20
White women	38	56	33
Black men	86	11	15
Black women	82	17	22
Age
17–29 years old	64	33	14
30–44 years old	65	31	27
45–59 years old	58	38	36
60 and older	47	48	23
Marital status
Married	56	39	60
Single	61	36	40
Family income
Less than $50,000	60	36	23
$50,000 or more	57	39	77
College education
No college degree	60	36	43
College graduate	57	40	57
Which issue is the most important facing the country?
The economy	59	36	47
The war in Iraq	62	34	30
Health care	53	47	21

== See also ==
- 2008 Democratic Party presidential primaries
- 2008 Maryland Republican presidential primary
