= 2008 Virginia Republican presidential primary =

- February 12, 2008

Candidate	John McCain	Mike Huckabee
Home state	Arizona	Arkansas
Delegate count	60	0
Popular vote	244,829	199,003
Percentage	50.04%	40.67%
- County results John McCain Mike Huckabee

The 2008 Virginia Republican presidential primary took place on February 12, 2008. This was an open primary with 63 delegates (60 pledged delegates) at stake in a winner take all format. The District of Columbia and Maryland both held primaries on the same day, referred to as the "Potomac primary".

John McCain won the primary, receiving all of Virginia's delegates to the 2008 Republican National Convention.

== Results ==
Virginia Republican primary, February 12, 2008
Candidate	Votes	Percentage
John McCain	244,829	50.04%
Mike Huckabee	199,003	40.67%
Ron Paul	21,999	4.50%
Mitt Romney*	18,002	3.68%
Fred Thompson*	3,395	0.69%
Rudy Giuliani*	2,024	0.41%
Total:	489,252	100.0%

*Candidate suspended campaign prior to this primary

== See also ==
- 2008 Republican Party presidential primaries
- 2008 Virginia Democratic presidential primary
