= 2008 United States presidential election in the District of Columbia =

- November 4, 2008

Nominee	Barack Obama	John McCain
Party	Democratic	Republican
Home state	Illinois	Arizona
Running mate	Joe Biden	Sarah Palin
Electoral vote	3	0
Popular vote	245,800	17,367
Percentage	92.46%	6.53%

Obama
60–70%
70–80%
80–90%
90–100%
President before election
George W. Bush
Republican
Elected President
Barack Obama
Democratic

The 2008 United States presidential election in the District of Columbia took place on November 4, 2008, and was part of the 2008 United States presidential election. In D.C., voters chose three representatives, or electors to the Electoral College, who voted for president and vice president. Prior to the election, the nation's capital was considered to be a certain lock for Obama. Washington D.C. is fiercely Democratic and has voted for the Democratic candidate in every presidential election by large margins since 1964 when the District gained the right to electoral representation through the 23rd amendment.

The District of Columbia went to Democrat Barack Obama by a margin of 210,403 votes out of 225,224 votes cast, about 92% of the total vote. As of 2024, this remains the largest share of the popular vote ever won by any candidate in the District of Columbia since it was granted electoral votes in 1961. This was larger than John Kerry's in 2004, when he won the District with about 89% of the vote.

Obama received the largest vote share for a major party nominee in any jurisdiction since Franklin D. Roosevelt in the 1940 United States presidential election in Mississippi.

== Primaries ==
- 2008 District of Columbia Democratic primary
- 2008 District of Columbia Republican primary

== Campaign ==
=== Predictions ===
16 news organizations made state-by-state predictions of the election. Here are their last predictions before election day:

Source	Ranking
D.C. Political Report	Likely D
Cook Political Report	Solid D
The Takeaway	Solid D
Electoral-vote.com	Solid D
Washington Post	Solid D
Politico	Solid D
RealClearPolitics	Solid D
FiveThirtyEight	Solid D
CQ Politics	Solid D
The New York Times	Solid D
CNN	Safe D
NPR	Solid D
MSNBC	Solid D
Fox News	Likely D
Associated Press	Likely D
Rasmussen Reports	Safe D

== Results ==
2008 United States presidential election in the District of Columbia
Party	Candidate	Running mate	Votes	Percentage	Electoral votes
Democratic	Barack Obama	Joe Biden	245,800	92.46%	3
Republican	John McCain	Sarah Palin	17,367	6.53%	0
Independent	Ralph Nader	Matt Gonzalez	958	0.36%	0
Green	Cynthia McKinney	Rosa Clemente	590	0.22%	0
N/A	Write-ins	N/A	1,138	0.43%	0
Totals			265,853	100.00%	3
Voter turnout			53.51%		—

Bob Barr was certified as a write-in in the District of Columbia, but votes for him were not counted. Litigation is ongoing to have the votes counted.

=== By ward ===
Ward	Barack Obama Democratic		John McCain Republican		Other candidates Various parties		Margin		Total votes cast
Ward	#	%	#	%	#	%	#	%	Total votes cast
Ward 1	28,977	93.39%	1,599	5.15%	453	1.46%	27,378	88.24%	31,029
Ward 2	24,865	85.88%	3,619	12.50%	468	1.62%	21,246	73.38%	28,952
Ward 3	30,491	82.79%	5,737	15.58%	603	1.64%	24,754	67.21%	36,831
Ward 4	34,720	95.40%	1,395	3.83%	280	0.76%	33,325	91.57%	36,395
Ward 5	33,259	96.74%	887	2.58%	233	0.68%	32,372	94.16%	34,379
Ward 6	31,031	88.64%	3,518	10.05%	457	1.31%	27,513	78.59%	35,006
Ward 7	33,663	98.72%	312	0.91%	125	0.36%	33,351	97.81%	34,100
Ward 8	27,394	99.02%	210	0.76%	61	0.22%	27,184	98.26%	27,665
Total	244,400	92.46%	17,277	6.53%	2,680	1.01%	227,123	85.93%	264,357

== Electors ==
Technically the voters of D.C. cast their ballots for electors: representatives to the Electoral College. D.C. is allocated three electors. All candidates who appear on the ballot or qualify to receive write-in votes must submit a list of three electors, who pledge to vote for their candidate and their running mate. Whoever wins the majority of votes in the state is awarded all three electoral votes. Their chosen electors then vote for president and vice president. Although electors are pledged to their candidate and running mate, they are not obligated to vote for them. An elector who votes for someone other than their candidate is known as a faithless elector.

The electors of each state and the District of Columbia met on December 15, 2008, to cast their votes for president and vice president. The Electoral College itself never meets as one body. Instead the electors from each state and the District of Columbia met in their respective capitols.

The following were the members of the Electoral College from the state. All three were pledged to Barack Obama and Joe Biden:

- Muriel Bowser
- Jerry S. Cooper
- Vincent C. Gray

== See also ==
- United States presidential elections in the District of Columbia
