= Potomac primary =

American primary elections

Two states and one district held caucuses or primary elections in the Potomac primary, 2008. Purple represents contests for both parties (3).

The Potomac primary (named after the river that splits the region), also called Chesapeake Tuesday, the Beltway primary, and the Crabcake primary, is the confluence of three Democratic presidential primaries and three Republican presidential primaries that takes place after Super Tuesday in Maryland, Virginia, and the national capital of Washington, D.C.

== 2008 ==
=== Republican primaries ===
- 2008 District of Columbia Republican presidential primary
- 2008 Maryland Republican presidential primary
- 2008 Virginia Republican presidential primary

=== Democratic primaries ===
- 2008 District of Columbia Democratic presidential primary
- 2008 Maryland Democratic presidential primary
- 2008 Virginia Democratic presidential primary

=== Results ===
The results on both sides were fairly unsurprising according to opinion polling, with both John McCain and Barack Obama winning by substantial margins. For Obama, however, the race had been significant as a major source of delegates in the close Democratic race, with him garnering a net gain of 50 delegates.

== 2012 ==
=== Republican primaries ===
- 2012 District of Columbia Republican presidential primary
- 2012 United States presidential election in Maryland

=== Democratic primaries ===
President Barack Obama ran unopposed.

== 2016 ==
In the 2016 election, on both the Republican and Democratic sides, Maryland, Virginia and the District of Columbia held their primaries on three separate days. Virginia's 2016 primaries were part of Super Tuesday, while Maryland's took place on April 26. The Democrats of the District of Columbia held their primary on June 14, while the District's Republicans instead opted for a caucus, which took place on March 12.
