= 2008 Virginia Democratic presidential primary =

- February 12, 2008

Candidate	Barack Obama	Hillary Clinton
Home state	Illinois	New York
Delegate count	54	29
Popular vote	627,820	349,766
Percentage	63.66%	35.46%
- County and independent city results Obama: 40–50% 50–60% 60–70% 70–80% 80–90% Clinton: 40–50% 50–60% 60–70% 70–80% 80–90%

The 2008 Virginia Democratic presidential primary took place on February 12, 2008, an election day nicknamed the "Potomac Primary" because the District of Columbia and Maryland also held Democratic primaries. The Virginia Democratic primary was an open primary, and was competitive for the first time since 1988. Barack Obama won the primary, as he did the other Potomac contests that day.

== Candidates ==
Six national candidates appeared on the ballot in the Virginia primary. However, all but Obama and Hillary Clinton had withdrawn prior to the primary on February 12.

=== Remaining ===
- New York Senator Hillary Clinton
- Illinois Senator Barack Obama

=== Eliminated ===
- Former North Carolina Senator John Edwards Dropped out on January 30, 2008
- Ohio Representative Dennis Kucinich Dropped out on January 25, 2008
- New Mexico Governor Bill Richardson Dropped out on January 10, 2008
- Delaware Senator Joe Biden Dropped out on January 3, 2008

== Background ==
The prior week, Barack Obama had beaten Hillary Clinton in Nebraska (68%-32%), in Washington (68%-31%) and in Louisiana (57%-36%) by large margins.

The Clinton Campaign looked towards the primary in Virginia as well as those in Maryland and Washington, D.C. which were held on the same day. Though Hillary Clinton spent more resources in the Maryland Primary, she also campaigned in Virginia, particularly in Northern Virginia.

=== Strategy ===
The Barack Obama campaign divided Virginia into 4 regions in which to campaign: Northern Virginia, Richmond, Charlottesville, and the Tidewater region in the southeast. He was expected to do well with affluent and independent voters, as well as with African-American voters, who could total 25% of the vote on primary day.

The Hillary Clinton campaign said it would focus its efforts on Prince William and Loudoun counties, especially older white professional women, and also in the unemployment plagued Southwest Virginia.

== Polling ==
Barack Obama had a significant lead over Hillary Clinton in final polling throughout the state.

Final Polling
Pollster	Barack Obama	Hillary Clinton
Survey USA	60%	38%
Mason Dixon	53%	37%
InsiderAdvantage	52%	37%
Rasmussen	55%	37%

== Results ==
Key:	Withdrew prior to contest

Virginia Democratic presidential primary, 2008 99.95% of precincts reporting
Candidate	Votes	Percentage	National delegates
Barack Obama	627,820	63.66%	54
Hillary Clinton	349,766	35.46%	29
John Edwards	5,206	0.52%	0
Dennis Kucinich	1,625	0.16%	0
Bill Richardson	991	0.10%	0
Joe Biden	795	0.08%	0
Totals	986,203	100.00%	83

== Analysis ==
2008 Virginia Democratic presidential primary
Demographic subgroup	Obama	Clinton	% of total vote
White men	56	42	27
White women	45	54	35
Black men	93	7	13
Black women	85	15	17

== See also ==
- Democratic Party (United States) presidential primaries, 2008
- Virginia Republican primary, 2008
