= 2008 District of Columbia Democratic presidential primary =

- February 12, 2008

Candidate	Barack Obama	Hillary Clinton
Home state	Illinois	New York
Delegate count	12	3
Popular vote	93,386	29,470
Percentage	75.31%	23.77%
- Election results by ward Obama: 60–70% 70–80% 80–90%

The 2008 District of Columbia Democratic presidential primary took place on February 12, 2008, nicknamed the "Potomac Primary" because Maryland and Virginia, which border the Potomac River, also held Democratic primaries that day. Fifteen delegates were up for grabs in the District of Columbia Democratic Primary, including 10 delegates from the District of Columbia's municipal subdivisions (five delegates for Wards 1-4, and five delegates for Wards 5-8). An additional five delegates were awarded to the at-large winner, Barack Obama. These 15 delegates represented the District of Columbia at the Democratic National Convention in Denver, Colorado. A total of 24 unpledged delegates, known as superdelegates, also attended the convention and cast their votes as well.

Barack Obama received the endorsements of Mayor Adrian Fenty and former Mayor Marion Barry (both African Americans), while he and Hillary Clinton were both endorsed by various members on the District of Columbia City Council. Barack Obama won the District of Columbia, as he did the other Potomac contests that day. He earned 12 pledged delegates to Clinton's 3.

== Results ==
2008 District of Columbia Democratic Presidential Primary Results
Party	Candidate	Votes	Percentage	Delegates
Democratic	Barack Obama	93,386	75.31%	12
Democratic	Hillary Clinton	29,470	23.77%	3
Democratic	John Edwards	347	0.28%	0
Democratic	Uncommitted	339	0.27%	0
Democratic	Dennis Kucinich	193	0.16%	0
Democratic	Bill Richardson	145	0.12%	0
Democratic	Write-ins	114	0.09%	0
Totals		123,994	100.00%	15
Voter turnout		%		—

== Analysis ==
The District of Columbia is a city with a strong population of African Americans, a voting bloc that consistently backed Barack Obama nationwide. The District also includes highly educated upper-middle class professionals who tend to be relatively progressive, another segment of the population that often backed Obama.

== See also ==
- 2008 District of Columbia Republican presidential primary
