= 2008 District of Columbia Republican presidential primary =

- February 12, 2008

19 delegates to the Republican National Convention (16 pledged, 3 unpledged) All pledged delegates are awarded to the candidate receiving the most votes.

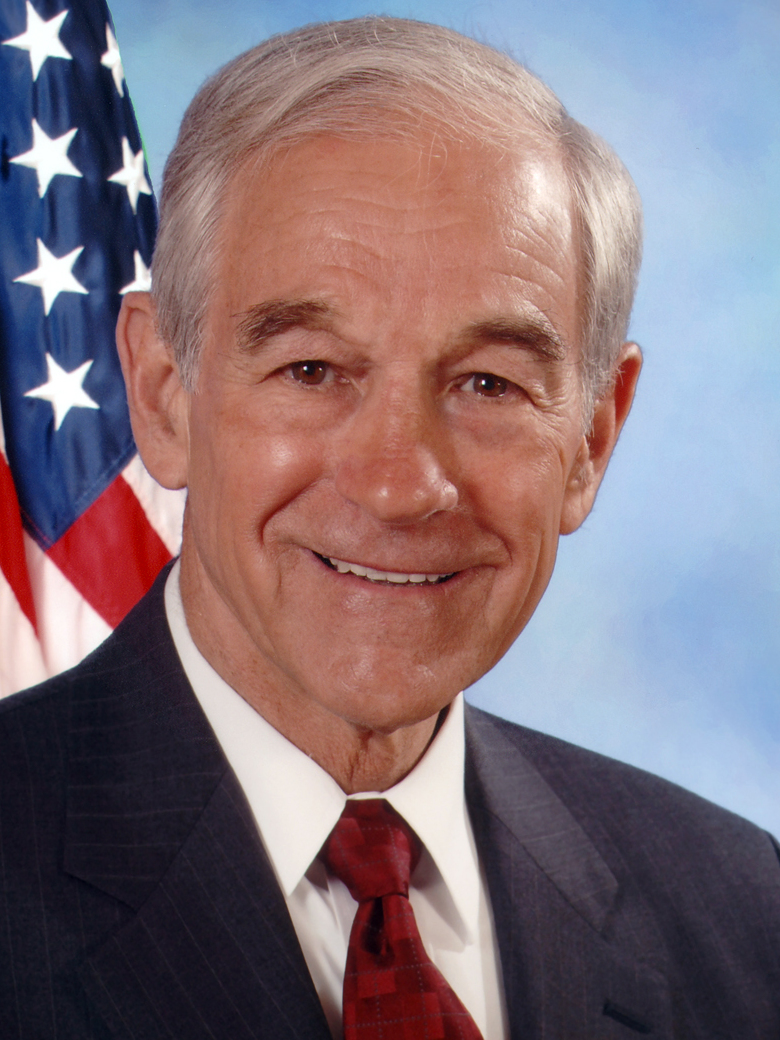

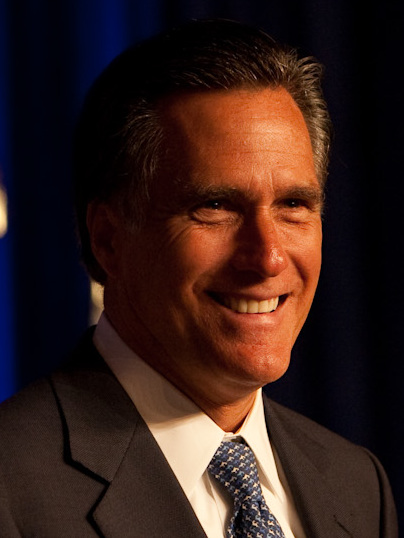
Candidate	John McCain	Mike Huckabee
Home state	Arizona	Arkansas
Delegate count	16	0
Popular vote	4,198	1,020
Percentage	67.59%	16.42%
Candidate	Ron Paul	Mitt Romney (withdrawn)
Home state	Texas	Massachusetts
Delegate count	0	0
Popular vote	494	398
Percentage	7.95%	6.41%
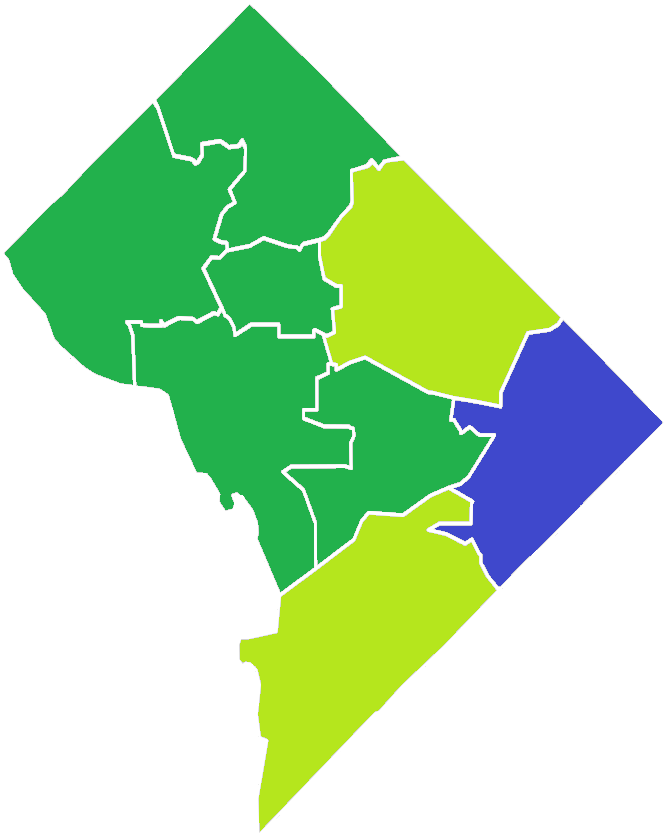
- Green for McCain Majority, Lime Green for McCain Plurality, Blue for Huckabee Plurality

The 2008 District of Columbia Republican presidential primary took place on February 12, 2008. Virginia and Maryland both held primaries on the same day, so the day's elections were collectively called "the Potomac primary". John McCain decisively won the primary, securing the votes of all 16 DC delegates to the 2008 Republican National Convention.

== Results ==
100% of precincts reporting
Candidate	Votes	Percentage	Delegates
John McCain	4,198	67.59%	16
Mike Huckabee	1,020	16.42%	0
Ron Paul	494	7.95%	0
Mitt Romney*	398	6.41%	0
Rudy Giuliani*	101	1.63%	0
Total	6,211	100%	16

*Candidate suspended campaign prior to this primary

Mike Huckabee received a plurality of votes in Ward 7. John McCain received a plurality of votes in Ward 5 and Ward 8 and a majority of votes in the other five wards.

== See also ==
- 2008 District of Columbia Democratic presidential primary
- 2008 Republican Party presidential primaries
