= Statewide opinion polling for the February 2008 Democratic Party presidential primaries =

This article is a collection of statewide public opinion polls that have been conducted relating to the February Democratic presidential primaries, 2008.

== Polling ==
=== Super Tuesday ===
See: Statewide opinion polling for the Super Tuesday Democratic Party presidential primaries, 2008.

=== District of Columbia ===
(Washington, D.C.) District of Columbia winner: Barack Obama
Format: Primary see: District of Columbia Democratic primary, 2008
Date: 12 February 2008
Delegates At Stake 15
Delegates Won To be determined

Poll source	Date	Highlights
Actual results	February 12, 2008	Obama 75%, Clinton 24%
Constituent Dynamics Sampling Size: 1,194; Margin of Error: ± 2.82%	February 7–8, 2008	Obama 63%, Clinton 27%, Undecided 10%

=== Hawaii ===
Hawaii winner: Barack Obama
Format: Caucus see: Hawaii Democratic caucuses, 2008
Date: 19 February 2008
Delegates At Stake 20
Delegates Won Barack Obama 20, Clinton 6

Poll source	Date	Highlights
Actual results	February 19, 2008	Obama 76%, Clinton 24%
Touch Tone Polls (Both districts combined) Sample Size: 775; Margin of Error: ± 5%	February 18, 2008	Obama 59%, Clinton 24%, Undecided 17%
Touch Tone Polls Sample Size: 676; Margin of Error: ± 3.7%	February 1, 2008	Obama 48.9%, Undecided 27.1%, Clinton 23.9%

=== Maine ===
Maine winner: Barack Obama
Format: Caucus see: Maine Democratic caucuses, 2008
Date: 10 February 2008
Delegates At Stake 24
Delegates Won To be determined
See also

Poll source	Date	Highlights
Actual results	February 10, 2008	Obama 59%, Clinton 40%
Critical Insights	April 20–27 April 2007	Clinton 39%, Obama 22%, Edwards 16%, Richardson 3%, Biden 1%, Kucinich 1%, Undecided 18%
American Research Group	2–6 February 2007	Clinton 41%, Obama 17%, Edwards 14%, Biden 2%, Dodd 2%, Vilsack 2%, Clark 1%, Kucinich 1%, Richardson 1%, undecided 20%

=== Maryland ===
Maryland winner: Barack Obama
Format: Primary see: Maryland Democratic primary, 2008
Date: 12 February 2008
Delegates At Stake 70
Delegates Won To be determined

Poll source	Date	Highlights
Actual results	February 12, 2008	Obama 61%, Clinton 36%
SurveyUSA Sampling Size: 774; Margin of Error: ±3.6%	February 9–10, 2008	Obama 55%, Clinton 32%, other 1%, uncommitted 6%, undecided 5%
American Research Group Sample Size: 600; Margin of Error: ± 4%	February 8–9, 2008	Obama 55%, Clinton 37%, someone else 2%, undecided 6%
Constituent Dynamics Sampling Size: 6,486; Margin of Error: ± 1.75%	February 7–8, 2008	Obama 53%, Clinton 38%, Undecided 11%
Mason-Dixon Sample Size: 400; Margin of Error: ± 5.0%	February 7–8, 2008	Obama 53%, Clinton 35%, other 2%, undecided 10%
SurveyUSA Sampling Size: 737; Margin of Error: ±3.7%	February 7–8, 2008	Obama 52%, Clinton 33%, other 2%, uncommitted 6%, undecided 7%
Rasmussen Reports Sampling Size: 925; Margin of Error: ±4%	February 6, 2008	Obama 57%, Hillary Clinton 31%, undecided 23%
Baltimore Sun Margin of Error: ±4.6%	January 6–9, 2008	Obama 39%, Clinton 26%, Edwards 12%, other 4%, undecided 12%
Washington Post	October 18–27, 2007	Clinton 48%, Obama 29%, Edwards 8%, Biden 3%, Richardson 2%, Kucinich 1%, other 3%, undecided 5%
OpinionWorks	August 24–26, 2007	Clinton 32%, Obama 18%, Edwards 10%, undecided 32%

=== Virginia ===
Virginia winner Barack Obama
Format: Primary see: Virginia Democratic primary, 2008
Date: February 12, 2008
Delegates At Stake 83
Delegates Won To be determined

Poll source	Date	Highlights
Actual results	February 12, 2008	Obama 64%, Clinton 35%
SurveyUSA Sample Size: 596; Margin of Error: ± 4%	February 9–10, 2008	Obama 60%, Clinton 38%, other 2%, undecided 1%
American Research Group Sample Size: 600; Margin of Error: ± 4%	February 8–9, 2008	Obama 56%, Clinton 38%, someone else 2%, undecided 4%
Constituent Dynamics Sampling Size: 6,596; Margin of Error: ± 1.48%	February 7–8, 2008	Obama 51%, Clinton 34%, Undecided 15%
SurveyUSA Sample Size: 588; Margin of Error: ± 4.1%	February 7–8, 2008	Obama 59%, Clinton 39%, other 1%, undecided 1%
Mason-Dixon Sample Size: 400; Margin of Error: ± 5,0%	February 7–8, 2008	Obama 53%, Clinton 37%
Rasmussen Reports Sampling Size: 719; Margin of Error: ±4%	February 6–7, 2008	Obama 55%, Clinton 37%, undecided 23%
InsiderAdvantage Sample Size: 501; Margin of Error: ± 4%	February 7, 2008	Obama 52%, Clinton 37%, other 1%, undecided 10%
SurveyUSA Sample Size: 369; Margin of Error: ± 5.1%		Obama 59%, Clinton 37%, other 2%, undecided 3%
Washington Post	October 4–8, 2007	Clinton 50%, Obama 25%, Edwards 11%
Elon University	February 18–22, 2007	Clinton 27%, Obama 13%, Edwards 4%, Richardson 1%, Dodd 1%, undecided 54%

=== Washington ===
(Washington (state)) Washington winner: Barack Obama
First Tier Precinct Caucuses: February 9, 2008
Delegates At Stake 78
Delegates Won 56

Poll source	Date	Highlights
Actual results	February 9, 2008	Obama 68%, Clinton 31%
Survey USA Sample Size: 575; Margin of Error: ± 4.2%	February 2–3, 2008	Obama 53%, Clinton 40%, undecided 7% (Obama had a 22-point lead over Clinton with those who will caucus.)
Strategic Vision	October 5–7, 2007	Clinton 48%, Obama 22%, Edwards 10%, Richardson 5%, Biden 3%, Dodd 1%, Kucinich 1%, undecided 10%
Survey USA	April 26 – May 3, 2007	Clinton 38%, Obama 30%, Edwards 19%, Richardson 4%, Other 5%, undecided 3%
Strategic Vision	6 November 2006	Clinton 32%, Gore 23%, Edwards 10%, Feingold 7%, Obama 6%, Clark 3%, Kerry 2%, Biden 1%, Richardson 1%, Bayh 1%, Rendell 1%, Vilsack 1%, Dodd 1%, undecided 11%

=== Wisconsin ===
Wisconsin winner: Barack Obama
Format: Primary see: Wisconsin Democratic primary, 2008
Date: February 19, 2008
Delegates at stake 74
Delegates won To be determined
See also

Poll source	Date	Highlights
Actual results	February 19, 2008	Obama 58%, Clinton 41%, other 1%
American Research Group Sample Size: 600 LV; Margin of Error: ± 4%	February 17–18, 2008	Obama 52%, Clinton 42%, other 1%, undecided 5% ‡
Public Policy Polling Sample Size: 822 LV; Margin of Error: ± 3.4%	February 16–17, 2008	Obama 53%, Clinton 40%, undecided 7% ‡
American Research Group Sample Size: 600 LV; Margin of Error: ± 4%	February 15–16, 2008	Clinton 49%, Obama 43%, other 1%, undecided 7% ‡
Research 2000 Sample Size: 600 LV; Margin of Error: ± 5%	February 13–14, 2008	Obama 47%, Clinton 42%, undecided 11% ‡
Rasmussen Reports Sample Size: 855 LV; Margin of Error: ± 4%	February 13, 2008	Obama 47%, Clinton 43%, undecided 10% ‡
Public Policy Polling Sample Size: 642 LV; Margin of Error: ± 3.9%	February 11, 2008	Obama 50%, Clinton 39% ‡
Strategic Vision Sample Size: 800 LV; Margin of Error: ± 3%	February 8–10, 2008	Obama 45%, Clinton 41%, undecided 14% ‡
American Research Group Sample Size: 600; Margin of Error: ± 4%	February 6–7, 2008	Clinton 50%, Obama 41%, someone else 1%, undecided 8%
Strategic Vision	December 7–9, 2007	Clinton 36%, Obama 29%, Edwards 12%, Richardson 6%, Biden 5%, Dodd 1%, Kucinich 1%, undecided 10%
Strategic Vision	September 14–16, 2007	Clinton 44%, Obama 22%, Edwards 11%, Richardson 7%, Biden 3%, Dodd 1%, Kucinich 1%, undecided 11%
Strategic Vision	July 13–15, 2007	Clinton 40%, Obama 24%, Edwards 14%, Richardson 6%, Biden 3%, Dodd 1%, Kucinich 1%, undecided 11%
Strategic Vision (R)	May 4–6, 2007	Clinton 38%, Obama 25%, Edwards 17% Joe Biden 6%, Richardson 2%, Dodd 1%, Kucinich 1%, undecided 10%
Wisconsin Policy Research Institute	April 3–17, 2007	Clinton 33%, Obama 30%, Edwards, 18%, Richardson 2%, other 7%, undecided 10%
Strategic Vision (R)	28 February 2007	Clinton 36%, Obama 21%, Edwards 17%, Clark 5%, Biden 2%, Richardson 2%, Dodd 1%, Kucinich 1%, undecided 15%
Strategic Vision (R)	6 November 2006	Clinton 32%, Gore 28%, Edwards 12%, Obama 9%, Kerry 1%, Biden 1%, Clark 1%, Vilsack 1%, Bayh 1%, Rendell 1%, Richardson 1%, Dodd 1%, undecided 11%
