= 2008 United States presidential election in Wisconsin =

- November 4, 2008
- Turnout: 69.2% (▼3.7 pp)

Nominee	Barack Obama	John McCain
Party	Democratic	Republican
Home state	Illinois	Arizona
Running mate	Joe Biden	Sarah Palin
Electoral vote	10	0
Popular vote	1,677,211	1,262,393
Percentage	56.22%	42.31%

Obama
40–50%
50–60%
60–70%
70–80%
80–90%
90–100%
McCain
40–50%
50–60%
60–70%
70–80%
80–90%
90–100%
Tie/No Data
President before election
George W. Bush
Republican
Elected President
Barack Obama
Democratic

The 2008 United States presidential election in Wisconsin took place on November 4, 2008, as part of the 2008 United States presidential election in which all 50 states plus the District of Columbia participated. State voters chose 10 electors to represent them in the Electoral College via a popular vote pitting Democratic U.S. Senator from Illinois Barack Obama, and his running mate U.S. Senator from Delaware Joe Biden, against Republican challenger and U.S. Senator from Arizona John McCain and his running mate, Alaska Governor Sarah Palin.

Also on the ballot were four third parties: activist and former presidential candidate Ralph Nader ran as an independent with his running mate, President of the San Francisco Board of Supervisors Matt Gonzalez. The Libertarian Party nominated former Representative from Georgia Bob Barr for president and conservative author Wayne Allyn Root for vice president. Pastor Chuck Baldwin and attorney Darrell Castle were nominated by the right-wing Constitution Party, and the left-wing Green Party nominated former Representative from Georgia Cynthia McKinney and community organizer Rosa Clemente.

Wisconsin was won by Democratic nominee Barack Obama by a 13.91% margin of victory. Prior to the election, all 17 news organizations considered this a state Obama would win, or otherwise considered as a safe blue state, despite the extremely close margins of victory in the previous two presidential elections. Polling throughout the state began to show a sizable and widening lead for Democrat Barack Obama of neighboring Illinois over Republican John McCain of Arizona. Obama carried Wisconsin with over 56% of the vote, significantly improving upon John Kerry's very narrow margin of victory in 2004. Obama is the only candidate since 1988 to win the state with the majority of the vote, and the only candidate since 1996 to win by a margin of more than 1%, both of which he would go on to do again in 2012.

Whether measured by raw vote margin, percentage of total votes, or two-party percentage, Obama's victory remains the strongest performance for any candidate in the state since the landslide re-election of Democrat Lyndon B. Johnson in 1964. In fact, Obama carried two of three counties that voted for Barry Goldwater in that election and became the first Democrat since Franklin D. Roosevelt in 1936 to carry Waupaca County, and only the second Democratic nominee to carry that county since the Civil War. This is also the most recent election where Wisconsin was decided by double digits, the first time since 1936 that Wisconsin voted more Democratic than its neighboring state of Minnesota, as well as the last in which the Democratic candidate won a majority of counties in the state.

As of 2024, this is the last time that Barron, Brown, Burnett, Calumet, Chippewa, Clark, Iron, Jefferson, Kewaunee, Langlade, Manitowoc, Marathon, Marinette, Monroe, Oconto, Oneida, Outagamie, Pierce, Rusk, Shawano, Washburn, Waupaca, Waushara, and Wood counties voted Democratic.

== Primaries ==
- 2008 Wisconsin Republican presidential primary
- 2008 Wisconsin Democratic presidential primary

== Campaign ==
=== Predictions ===
There were 16 news organizations who made state-by-state predictions of the election. Here are their last predictions before election day:

Source	Ranking
D.C. Political Report	Likely D
Cook Political Report	Solid D
The Takeaway	Solid D
Electoral-vote.com	Solid D
Washington Post	Solid D
Politico	Solid D
RealClearPolitics	Solid D
FiveThirtyEight	Solid D
CQ Politics	Solid D
The New York Times	Lean D
CNN	Lean D
NPR	Solid D
MSNBC	Solid D
Fox News	Likely D
Associated Press	Likely D
Rasmussen Reports	Safe D

=== Polling ===
Pre-election polling early on showed a tight race. However, after May 18, Obama swept every single poll. Since September 21, Obama won every poll with at least 49% of the vote. The final 3 polls averaged Obama leading 53% to 40%.

=== Fundraising ===
John McCain raised a total of $1,728,185 in the state. Barack Obama raised $4,862,486.

=== Advertising and visits ===
Obama and his interest groups spent $13,586,634. McCain and his interest groups spent $9,240,899. Each ticket visited the state 7 times.

== Analysis ==
Having voted for the Democratic presidential nominees by comfortable margins in 1988, 1992, and 1996, but extremely narrow margins in 2000 and 2004, Wisconsin was originally considered to be a swing state in 2008. However, Obama took a wide lead in the polls in Wisconsin in the final weeks before the election and many pundits and news organizations labeled the state as a safe blue state.

Obama won Wisconsin by a comfortable 13.91% margin of victory. Obama carried the heavily Democratic cities of Milwaukee and Madison by large margins, winning above two-thirds of the vote, along with some traditionally Republican cities like Green Bay and Appleton. In Dane County, he won almost 73% of the vote, and carried 67.3% in Milwaukee County. This was consistent with Obama's pattern of strong performances in the states bordering Illinois. Obama's best performance, at 86.81%, was in the small county of Menominee, which is 87% Native American. The state's Republican base essentially melted; John McCain only carried 13 of the state's 72 counties, a devastating defeat. McCain did best in the Milwaukee suburbs like Waukesha and Ozaukee counties, with his best performance in Washington County where he received 64.14% of the vote. He only won five counties in the Northern part of the state, all of which by rather narrow margins.

== Results ==
2008 United States presidential election in Wisconsin
Party	Candidate	Running mate	Votes	Percentage	Electoral votes
Democratic	Barack Obama	Joe Biden	1,677,211	56.22%	10
Republican	John McCain	Sarah Palin	1,262,393	42.31%	0
Independent	Ralph Nader	Matt Gonzalez	17,605	0.59%	0
Libertarian	Bob Barr	Wayne Allyn Root	8,858	0.30%	0
Write-ins			6,521	0.22%	0
Independent (Note: Ran as the national Constitution Party nominee, listed as an independent on the ballot)	Chuck Baldwin	Darrell Castle	5,072	0.17%	0
Green	Cynthia McKinney	Rosa Clemente	4,216	0.14%	0
Independent (Note: Ran as a national nominee of the We the People Foundation, listed as an independent on the ballot)	Jeffrey Wamboldt		764	0.03%	0
Independent (Note: Ran as the national Socialist Party USA nominee, listed as an independent on the ballot)	Brian Moore	Stewart Alexander	540	0.02%	0
Independent (Note: Ran as the national Party for Socialism and Liberation nominee, listed as an independent on the ballot)	Gloria La Riva		237	0.01%	0
Totals			2,983,417	100.00%	10
Voter turnout (Voting age population)					70.8%

=== By county ===
County	Barack Obama Democratic		John McCain Republican		Various candidates Other parties		Margin		Total votes cast
County	#	%	#	%	#	%	#	%	Total votes cast
Adams	5,806	58.14%	3,974	39.80%	206	2.06%	1,832	18.34%	9,986
Ashland	5,818	67.86%	2,634	30.72%	122	1.42%	3,184	37.14%	8,574
Barron	12,078	52.77%	10,457	45.69%	351	1.54%	1,621	7.08%	22,886
Bayfield	5,972	63.08%	3,365	35.54%	131	1.38%	2,607	27.54%	9,468
Brown	67,269	53.92%	55,854	44.77%	1,631	1.31%	11,415	9.15%	124,754
Buffalo	3,949	56.41%	2,923	41.76%	128	1.83%	1,026	14.65%	7,000
Burnett	4,337	49.92%	4,200	48.34%	151	1.74%	137	1.58%	8,688
Calumet	13,295	50.22%	12,722	48.05%	457	1.73%	573	2.17%	26,474
Chippewa	16,239	53.72%	13,492	44.63%	500	1.65%	2,747	9.09%	30,231
Clark	7,454	52.54%	6,383	44.99%	350	2.47%	1,071	7.55%	14,187
Columbia	16,661	56.92%	12,193	41.65%	418	1.43%	4,468	15.27%	29,272
Crawford	4,987	62.49%	2,830	35.46%	164	2.05%	2,157	27.03%	7,981
Dane	205,984	72.80%	73,065	25.82%	3,890	1.37%	132,919	46.98%	282,939
Dodge	19,183	44.80%	23,015	53.74%	625	1.46%	-3,832	-8.94%	42,823
Door	10,142	58.02%	7,112	40.68%	227	1.30%	3,030	17.34%	17,481
Douglas	15,830	65.78%	7,835	32.56%	401	1.66%	7,995	33.22%	24,066
Dunn	13,002	56.56%	9,566	41.61%	421	1.83%	3,436	14.95%	22,989
Eau Claire	33,146	60.25%	20,959	38.10%	905	1.65%	12,187	22.15%	55,010
Florence	1,134	42.23%	1,512	56.31%	39	1.46%	-378	-14.08%	2,685
Fond du Lac	23,463	44.84%	28,164	53.83%	696	1.33%	-4,701	-8.99%	52,323
Forest	2,673	57.08%	1,963	41.92%	47	1.00%	710	15.16%	4,683
Grant	14,875	61.16%	9,068	37.29%	377	1.55%	5,807	23.87%	24,320
Green	11,502	62.06%	6,730	36.31%	302	1.63%	4,772	25.75%	18,534
Green Lake	4,000	41.95%	5,393	56.55%	143	1.50%	-1,393	-14.60%	9,536
Iowa	7,987	66.73%	3,829	31.99%	153	1.28%	4,158	34.74%	11,969
Iron	1,914	55.77%	1,464	42.66%	54	1.57%	450	13.11%	3,432
Jackson	5,572	60.23%	3,552	38.40%	127	1.37%	2,020	21.83%	9,251
Jefferson	21,448	49.69%	21,096	48.87%	622	1.44%	352	0.82%	43,166
Juneau	6,186	53.65%	5,148	44.65%	196	1.70%	1,038	9.00%	11,530
Kenosha	45,836	58.18%	31,609	40.12%	1,344	1.70%	14,227	18.06%	78,789
Kewaunee	5,902	54.71%	4,711	43.67%	174	1.62%	1,191	11.04%	10,787
La Crosse	38,524	60.94%	23,701	37.49%	993	1.57%	14,823	23.45%	63,218
Lafayette	4,732	60.43%	2,984	38.10%	115	1.47%	1,748	22.33%	7,831
Langlade	5,182	49.82%	5,081	48.85%	139	1.33%	101	0.97%	10,402
Lincoln	8,424	55.17%	6,519	42.70%	325	2.13%	1,905	12.47%	15,268
Manitowoc	22,428	52.88%	19,234	45.35%	752	1.77%	3,194	7.53%	42,414
Marathon	36,367	53.53%	30,345	44.66%	1,228	1.81%	6,022	8.87%	67,940
Marinette	11,195	52.67%	9,726	45.76%	334	1.57%	1,469	6.91%	21,255
Marquette	4,068	51.85%	3,654	46.57%	124	1.58%	414	5.28%	7,846
Menominee	1,257	86.81%	185	12.78%	6	0.41%	1,072	74.03%	1,448
Milwaukee	319,819	67.30%	149,445	31.45%	5,928	1.25%	170,374	35.85%	475,192
Monroe	10,198	53.25%	8,666	45.25%	288	1.50%	1,532	8.00%	19,152
Oconto	9,927	52.34%	8,755	46.16%	286	1.50%	1,172	6.18%	18,968
Oneida	11,907	54.30%	9,630	43.92%	390	1.78%	2,277	10.38%	21,927
Outagamie	50,294	54.93%	39,677	43.33%	1,592	1.74%	10,617	11.60%	91,563
Ozaukee	20,579	38.56%	32,172	60.29%	614	1.15%	-11,593	-21.73%	53,365
Pepin	2,102	55.74%	1,616	42.85%	53	1.41%	486	12.89%	3,771
Pierce	11,803	53.39%	9,812	44.38%	492	2.23%	1,991	9.01%	22,107
Polk	10,876	48.03%	11,282	49.83%	485	2.14%	-406	-1.80%	22,643
Portage	24,817	62.95%	13,810	35.03%	795	2.02%	11,007	27.92%	39,422
Price	4,559	55.64%	3,461	42.24%	174	2.12%	1,098	13.40%	8,194
Racine	53,408	53.07%	45,954	45.66%	1,280	1.27%	7,454	7.41%	100,642
Richland	5,041	59.66%	3,298	39.03%	111	1.31%	1,743	20.63%	8,450
Rock	50,529	63.82%	27,364	34.56%	1,276	1.62%	23,165	29.26%	79,169
Rusk	3,855	53.01%	3,253	44.73%	164	2.26%	602	8.28%	7,272
St. Croix	21,177	47.25%	22,837	50.95%	807	1.80%	-1,660	-3.70%	44,821
Sauk	18,617	60.79%	11,562	37.75%	447	1.46%	7,055	23.04%	30,626
Sawyer	4,765	52.45%	4,199	46.22%	121	1.33%	566	6.23%	9,085
Shawano	10,259	51.07%	9,538	47.48%	292	1.45%	721	3.59%	20,089
Sheboygan	30,395	48.94%	30,801	49.59%	911	1.47%	-406	-0.65%	62,107
Taylor	4,563	48.82%	4,586	49.07%	197	2.11%	-23	-0.25%	9,346
Trempealeau	8,321	62.50%	4,808	36.11%	185	1.39%	3,513	26.39%	13,314
Vernon	8,463	60.13%	5,367	38.13%	245	1.74%	3,096	22.00%	14,075
Vilas	6,491	47.21%	7,055	51.31%	204	1.48%	-564	-4.10%	13,750
Walworth	24,177	47.95%	25,485	50.54%	760	1.51%	-1,308	-2.59%	50,422
Washburn	4,693	51.50%	4,303	47.22%	116	1.28%	390	4.28%	9,112
Washington	25,719	34.56%	47,729	64.14%	963	1.30%	-22,010	-29.58%	74,411
Waukesha	85,339	36.64%	145,152	62.32%	2,406	1.04%	-59,813	-25.68%	232,897
Waupaca	12,952	50.77%	12,232	47.95%	327	1.28%	720	2.82%	25,511
Waushara	5,868	49.52%	5,770	48.70%	211	1.78%	98	0.82%	11,849
Winnebago	48,167	54.94%	37,946	43.28%	1,564	1.78%	10,221	11.66%	87,677
Wood	21,710	55.59%	16,581	42.46%	761	1.95%	5,129	13.13%	39,052
Totals	1,677,211	56.22%	1,262,393	42.31%	43,813	1.47%	414,818	13.91%	2,983,417

Counties that flipped from Republican to Democratic

- Barron (largest city: Rice Lake)
- Brown (largest city: Green Bay)
- Burnett (largest village: Grantsburg)
- Calumet (largest city: Chilton)
- Chippewa (largest city: Chippewa Falls)
- Clark (largest city: Neillsville)
- Columbia (largest city: Portage)
- Door (largest city: Sturgeon Bay)
- Forest (largest city: Crandon)
- Jefferson (largest city: Watertown)
- Juneau (largest city: Mauston)
- Kewaunee (largest city: Algoma)
- Langlade (largest city: Antigo)
- Lincoln (largest city: Merrill)
- Manitowoc (largest city: Manitowoc)
- Marathon (largest city: Wausau)
- Marinette (largest city: Marinette)
- Marquette (largest city: Montello)
- Monroe (largest city: Sparta)
- Oconto (largest city: Oconto)
- Oneida (largest city: Rhinelander)
- Outagamie (largest city: Appleton)
- Racine (largest city: Racine)
- Richland (largest city: Richland Center)
- Rusk (largest city: Ladysmith)
- Sawyer (largest city: Hayward)
- Shawano (largest city: Shawano)
- Washburn (largest city: Spooner)
- Waupaca (largest city: New London)
- Waushara (largest city: Berlin)
- Winnebago (largest city: Oshkosh)
- Wood (largest city: Marshfield)

=== By congressional district ===
Barack Obama swept the state, carrying seven of the state's eight congressional districts, including two districts held by Republicans.

District	McCain	Obama	Representative
1st	47.45%	51.40%	Paul Ryan
2nd	29.78%	69.00%	Tammy Baldwin
3rd	40.80%	57.76%	Ron Kind
4th	23.61%	75.39%	Gwen Moore
5th	57.73%	41.28%	Jim Sensenbrenner
6th	48.72%	49.91%	Tom Petri
7th	42.52%	55.91%	David Obey
8th	45.12%	53.59%	Steve Kagen

== Electors ==
Technically the voters of Wisconsin cast their ballots for electors: representatives to the Electoral College. Wisconsin is allocated 10 electors because it has 8 congressional districts and 2 senators. All candidates who appear on the ballot or qualify to receive write-in votes must submit a list of 10 electors, who pledge to vote for their candidate and his or her running mate. Whoever wins the majority of votes in the state is awarded all 10 electoral votes. Their chosen electors then vote for president and vice president. Although electors are pledged to their candidate and running mate, they are not obligated to vote for them.

The following were the members of the Electoral College from the state. All 10 were pledged to Barack Obama and Joe Biden:

1. Ray Rivera
2. Fred Risser
3. Rollie Hick
4. Polly Williams
5. Dean Palmer
6. Gordon Hintz
7. Christine Bremer-Muggli
8. Donsia Strong Hill
9. Jim Doyle
10. Joe Wineke

== See also ==
- United States presidential elections in Wisconsin
