= 2008 Wisconsin Republican presidential primary =

- February 19, 2008

40 pledged delegates to the Republican National Convention

Nominee	John McCain	Mike Huckabee
Home state	Arizona	Arkansas
Delegate count	34	6
Popular vote	224,755	151,707
Percentage	54.74%	36.95%
- County results John McCain Mike Huckabee

The 2008 Wisconsin Republican presidential primary was held on February 19, 2008. Polls in Wisconsin opened at 7:00 AM and closed 8:00 PM (local time) John McCain won the primary.

== Polls leading up to Primary ==
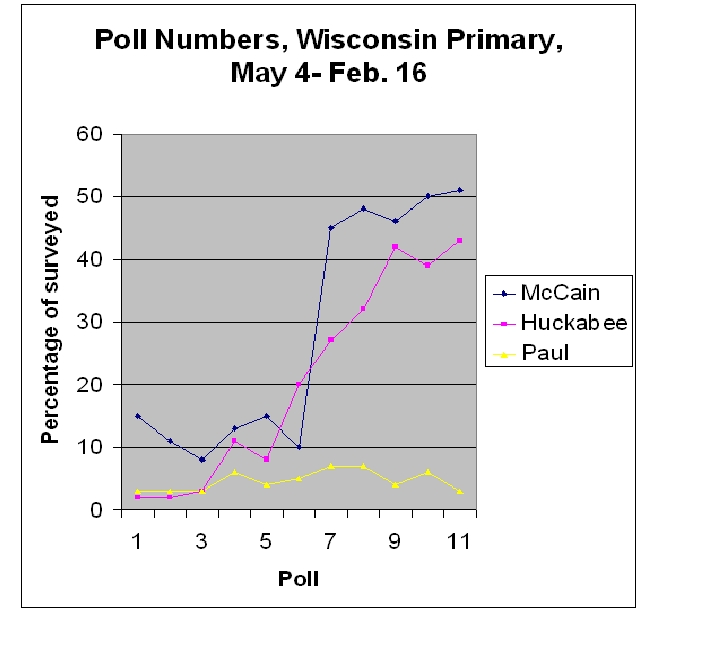

Last 3 Poll Averages

Candidate	ARG Poll Feb. 18	PPP Poll Feb. 17	ARG Poll Feb. 16
John McCain	51	50	46
Mike Huckabee	43	39	42
Ron Paul	3	6	4

== Results ==
Official Results

Candidate	Votes	Percentage	Delegates
John McCain	224,755	54.74%	34
Mike Huckabee	151,707	36.95%	6
Ron Paul	19,090	4.65%	0
Mitt Romney*	8,080	1.97%	0
Fred Thompson*	2,709	0.66%	0
Rudy Giuliani*	1,935	0.47%	0
Duncan Hunter*	799	0.19%	0
Tom Tancredo*	185	0.05%	0
Others	497	0.12%	0
Uninstructed Delegation	850	0.21%	0
Totals	402,699	100%	40

*Candidate stopped campaign before primary

== See also ==
- 2008 Republican Party presidential primaries
- 2008 Wisconsin Democratic presidential primary
