= Statewide opinion polling for the 2008 Super Tuesday Democratic Party presidential primaries =

This article is a collection of statewide public opinion polls that were conducted relating to the Super Tuesday Democratic presidential primaries, 2008.

== Polling ==
=== Alabama ===
Alabama winner: Barack Obama
Primary date: February 5, 2008
Delegates at stake 52
Delegates won to be determined
See also Alabama Democratic Presidential Preference

Poll source	Date	Highlights
Actual result (100% precincts reporting)	February 5, 2008	Obama 56%, Clinton 42%
InsiderAdvantage Sampling size: 408; Margin of error:	February 3, 2008	Obama 45%, Clinton 44%, other 3%, undecided 8%
Capital Survey Research Center Margin of error: 5.1± %	February 2, 2008	Obama 44.4%, Clinton 37.4%, other responses 18.2%
Rasmussen Reports Sampling size: 576; Margin of error: 4±%	January 31, 2008	Clinton 46%, Obama 41%, other 7%, undecided 6%
InsiderAdvantage Sampling size: 424; Margin of error: 5±%	January 31, 2008	Clinton 46%, Obama 40%, other 5%, undecided 9%
Survey USA Sampling size: 586; Margin of error: ± 4.1%	January 30–31, 2008	Obama 47%, Clinton 47%, other 5%, undecided 2%
Capital Survey Research Center Margin of error: ± 5%	January 30, 2008	Obama 40%, Clinton 35%, Edwards 9%, undecided 16%
Rasmussen Reports Sampling size: 649; Margin of error: ±4%	January 23, 2008	Clinton 43%, Obama 28%, John Edwards 16%, undecided 23%
Press Register/University of South Alabama Sampling size: 439; Margin of error: ±5%	January 7–15, 2008	Hillary Clinton 31%, Obama 28%, John Edwards 8%, undecided 33%
Capital Survey Research Center Margin of error: ± 6%	January 11, 2008	Obama 36%, Clinton 34%, Edwards 9%, other 1%, undecided 21%
Capital Survey Research Center Margin of error: ± 4.7%	November 19–20, 2007; November 26–27, 2007	Clinton 46%, Obama 25%, Edwards 6%
Capital Survey Research Center	August 14–16, 2007; September 17–19, 2007	Clinton 45%, Obama 24%, Edwards 9%, Al Gore 8%, other 3%, undecided 10%
American Research Group	July 30, 2007 – August 2, 2007	Clinton 38%, Edwards 19%, Obama 17%, Biden 4%, Richardson 4%, Dodd 1%, Kucinich 1%, Clark -, Gravel -, undecided 16%
Capital Survey Research Center	July 11–13, 2007; July 16–19, 2007	Clinton 33%, Obama 29%, Edwards 9%, Gore 6%
Mobile Register-University of South Alabama	April 16–19, 2007	Clinton 33%, Obama 25%, Edwards 12%, Gore 8%, Biden 1%, Kucinich 1%, Richardson 1%, Dodd <1%, undecided 19%
Capital Survey Research Center	February 19–22, 2007	Clinton 35%, Obama 19%, Edwards 9%, Gore 8%, other 8%, undecided 21%
American Research Group	February 8–13, 2007	Clinton 44%, Obama 13%, Edwards 11%, Clark 3%, Dodd 3%, Richardson 1%, Tom Vilsack 1%, undecided 23%
Capital Survey Research Center Poll	January 20, 2007	Clinton 27%, Obama 19%, Edwards 14%, Gore 11%

=== Arizona ===
Arizona winner: Hillary Clinton
Primary date: February 5, 2008
Delegates at stake 56
Delegates won to be determined
See also Arizona Democratic Presidential Preference

Poll source	Date	Highlights
Actual result (100% precincts reporting)	February 5, 2008	Clinton 51%, Obama 42%
Rasmussen Reports Sampling size: 537; Margin of error: ±4%	January 31, 2008	Clinton 46%, Obama 41%, other 12%, undecided 3%
Mason-Dixon Sampling size: 400; Margin of error: ±5%	January 30 – February 1, 2008	Clinton 43%, Obama 41%, undecided 13%
Behavior Research Center Margin of error: ±6.5%	January 20–24, 2008	Clinton 37%, Obama 27%, Edwards 15%, undecided 18%
Arizona State University Sampling size: 366; Margin of error: ±5.1%	January 17–20, 2008	Clinton 45%, Obama 24%, Edwards 9%, Kucinich 1%, undecided 21%
Cronkite/Eight Poll Margin of error: ± 6.8%	November 15–18, 2007	Clinton 41%, Obama 23%, Edwards 14%, Richardson 9%, undecided 13%
Rocky Mountain Poll	November 12–15, 2007	Clinton 44%, Obama 14%, Edwards 11%, Richardson 2%, Kucinich 1%, Biden -%, undecided 27%
American Research Group	October 5–9, 2007	Clinton 41%, Edwards 16%, Obama 14%, Richardson 7%, Biden 4%, Kucinich 2%, Dodd 2%, Gravel -, undecided 14%
American Research Group	July 23–26, 2007	Clinton 39%, Obama 25%, Richardson 9%, Edwards 8%, Biden 1%, Clark 1%, Kucinich 1%, Dodd -, Gravel -, undecided 16%
Rocky Mountain Poll	May 24–29, 2007	Clinton 26%, Obama 22%, Gore 13%, Richardson 7%, Edwards 7%, other 5%, undecided 20%
Cronkite/Eight Poll	April 19–22, 2007	Clinton 25%, Obama 20%, Edwards 18%, Gore 17%, undecided 20%
Cronkite/Eight Poll	27 February 2007	Clinton 28%, Obama 24%, Gore 16%, Edwards 14%, undecided 18%
American Research Group	8–13 February 2007	Clinton 33%, Obama 24%, Edwards 13%, Richardson 4%, Vilsack 3%, Clark 1%, Kucinich 1%, undecided 22%
Behavior Research Center/Rocky Mountain Poll	24 January 2007	Clinton 32%, Obama 18%, Edwards 15%, Gore 15%, Kerry 5%, Biden 3%, undecided 12%
Cronkite/Eight Poll	24 January 2007	Obama 29%, Clinton 23%, Edwards 15%, Gore 12%, undecided 21%

=== Arkansas ===
Arkansas winner: Hillary Clinton
Primary date: February 5, 2008
Delegates at stake 35
Delegates won to be determined
See also Arkansas Democratic Presidential Preference

Poll source	Date	Highlights
Actual result (100% precincts reporting)	February 5, 2008	Clinton 69%, Obama 27%
Global Strategy Group Sampling size: 608; Margin of error: ±4.4%	December 14, 2007	Clinton 57%, Obama 17%, Edwards 14%, Richardson 1%, undecided 11%
American Research Group	March 16–19, 2007	Clinton 49%, Obama 16%, Edwards 12%, Richardson 2%, Clark 8%, Biden 2%, Dodd 0%, Gravel 0%, Kucinich 0%, undecided 11%

=== California ===
California winner: Hillary Clinton
Primary date: February 5, 2008
Delegates at stake 370
Delegates won to be determined
See also Pollster

Poll source	Date	Highlights
Reuters/C-SPAN/Zogby Sampling size: 895; Margin of error: ±3.3%	February 3–4, 2008	Obama 49%, Clinton 36%, Gravel 1%, other 5%, undecided 9%
Survey USA Sampling size: 872; Margin of error: ±3.4%	February 3–4, 2008	Clinton 52%, Obama 42%, other 4%, undecided 2%
Survey USA Sampling size: 853; Margin of error: ±3.4%	February 2–3, 2008	Clinton 53%, Obama 41%, other 4%, undecided 2%
Reuters/C-SPAN/Zogby Sampling size: 967; Margin of error: ±3.2%	February 1–3, 2008	Obama 46%, Clinton 40%, Gravel 1%, other 5%, undecided 9%
Rasmussen Reports Sampling size: 798; Margin of error: ±4%	February 2, 2008	Obama 45%, Clinton 44%, undecided 5%
Reuters/C-SPAN/Zogby Sampling size: 1,141; Margin of error: ±2.9%	January 31 – February 2, 2008	Obama 45%, Clinton 41%, Gravel 1%, undecided 15%
Suffolk University Sampling size: 700	January 31 – February 1, 2008	Obama 39.8%, Clinton 38.6%, undecided 18.8%, refused 2.7%
Mason-Dixon Sampling size: 400; Margin of error: ±5%	January 30 – February 1, 2008	Clinton 45%, Obama 36%, undecided 16%
Field Sampling size: 511; Margin of error: ±4.5%	January 25 – February 1, 2008	Clinton 36%, Obama 34%, other 12%, undecided 18%
Rasmussen Reports Sampling size: 807; Margin of error: ±4%	January 29, 2008	Clinton 43%, Obama 40%, Edwards 9%, other 4%, undecided 4%
Survey USA Sampling size: 888; Margin of error: ±3.4%	January 27, 2008	Clinton 49%, Obama 38%, Edwards 9%, other 2%, undecided 2%
Politico/CNN/Los Angeles Times Sampling size: 690; Margin of error: ±4%	January 23–27, 2008	Clinton 49%, Obama 32%, Edwards 14%, undecided 4%
USA Today/Gallup Sampling size: 779; Margin of error: ±4%	January 23–26, 2008	Clinton 47%, Obama 35%, Edwards 10%, other 2%, undecided 6%
Public Policy Institute of California Sampling size: 543; Margin of error: ±4%	January 13–20, 2008	Clinton 43%, Obama 28%, Edwards 11%, Kucinich 5%, Richardson 1%, other 1%, undecided 11%
Field Sampling size: 377; Margin of error: ±5.2%	January 14–20, 2008	Clinton 39%, Obama 27%, Edwards 10%, other 4%, undecided 20%
Rasmussen Sampling size: 897; Margin of error: ±4%	January 14, 2008	Clinton 38%, Obama 33%, Edwards 12%, Kucinich 3%, undecided 13%
Survey USA Sampling size: 810; Margin of error: ±3.5%	January 11–13, 2008	Clinton 50%, Obama 35%, Edwards 10%, other 3%, undecided 2%
Politico/CNN/Los Angeles Times Sampling size: 384; Margin of error: ±5%	January 11–13, 2008	Clinton 47%, Obama 31%, Edwards 10%, undecided 6%
Field Research Corp. Sampling size: 457; Margin of error: ± 4.7%	December 10–17, 2007	Clinton 36%, Obama 22%, Edwards 13%, Richardson 3%, Biden 3%, Kucinich 2%, Dodd 1%, Gravel 0%, undecided 20%
Survey USA	December 14–16, 2007	Clinton 49%, Obama 30%, Edwards 14%, other 5%, undecided 3%
Public Policy Institute of California	November 27 – December 4, 2007	Clinton 44%, Obama 20%, Edwards 12%
Survey USA	November 30 – December 2, 2007	Clinton 50%, Obama 24%, Edwards 16%, other 7%, undecided 3%
Datamar	November 23–29, 2007	Clinton 54.0%, Obama 16.1%, Edwards 8.9%, Kucinich 4.9%, Richardson 4.8%, Biden 1.6%, Dodd 1.2%, undecided 8.5%
Survey USA	November 2–4, 2007	Clinton 53%, Obama 25%, Edwards 13%, other 6%, undecided 3%
The Field	October 11–21, 2007	Clinton 45%, Obama 20%, Edwards 11%, Richardson 4%, Kucinich 3%, Biden 3%, Dodd -%, Gravel -%, undecided 14%
Survey USA	October 12–14, 2007	Clinton 57%, Obama 20%, Edwards 13%, other 6%, undecided 6%
Survey and Policy Research Institute at San Jose State University	October 1–8, 2007	Clinton 42%, Obama 20%, Edwards 14%, other 5%
PPIC	September 4–11, 2007	Clinton 41%, Obama 23%, Edwards 14%, Richardson 3%, Kucinich 3%, Biden 2%, Dodd -%, Gravel -%, other 1%, undecided 13%
Survey USA	September 7–9, 2007	Clinton 51%, Obama 27%, Edwards 14%
The Field Poll	August 3–12, 2007	Clinton 49%, Obama 19%, Edwards 10%, Richardson 3%, Biden 3%, Kucinich 2%, Dodd 1%, Gravel 1%, undecided 12%
Survey USA	August 2–5, 2007	Clinton 51%, Obama 27%, Edwards 14%, other 6%, undecided 3%
American Research Group	July 30–2 August 2007	Clinton 35%, Obama 22%, Edwards 16%, Biden 5%, Richardson 5%, Dodd 1%, Kucinich 1%, Clark -, Gravel -, undecided 15%
Survey USA	June 29 – July 1, 2007	Clinton 49%, Obama 24%, Edwards 14%, other 9%, undecided 3%
San Jose State California Primary	June 18–22, 2007	Clinton 37%, Obama 15%, Edwards 15%, other 33%
Datamar	June 6–11, 2007	Clinton 36.9%, Obama 24.3%, Edwards 14.8%, Richardson 6.5%, Biden 4.5%, Kucinich 2.4%, Gravel .8%, Dodd 0%, undecided 9.9%
Survey USA	June 1–3, 2007	Clinton 46%, Obama 28%, Edwards 14%, other 8%, undecided 4%
American Research Group	May 4–8, 2007	Clinton 37%, Obama 28%, Edwards 15%, Richardson 3%, Biden 2%, Dodd 2%, Kucinich 2%, Clark -, Gravel -, undecided 11%
Survey USA	May 5–6, 2007	Clinton 48%, Obama 27%, Edwards 15%, other 7%, undecided 3%
Working Californians	April 9–12, 2007	Clinton 38%, Obama 19%, Edwards 17%, other/undecided 26%
Survey USA	March 30 – April 1, 2007	Clinton 43%, Obama 26%, Edwards 17%, Richardson 4%, other 4%, undecided 5%
The Field (without Gore)	March 20–21 March 2007	Clinton 41%, Obama 28%, Edwards 13%, Richardson 4%, Biden 3%, Kucinich 2%, Dodd 0%, undecided 9%
The Field (with Gore)	March 20–21 March 2007	Clinton 31%, Gore 25%, Obama 21%, Edwards 8%, Richardson 3%, Biden 2%, Kucinich 1%, Dodd 0%, undecided 9%
Survey USA	March 3–5, 2007	Clinton 44%, Obama 31%, Edwards 10%, Richardson 4%, other 5%, undecided 6%
Datamar	9–13 February 2007	Clinton 34.3%, Obama 23.6%, Edwards 16.2%, Richardson 7.2%, Kucinich 4.2%, Biden 3.9%, Dodd 0.8%, Gravel 0.3%, Vilsack 0.2%, undecided 9.2%
American Research Group	4–7 January 2007	Clinton 36%, Obama 33%, Edwards 6%, Kerry 4%, Clark 2%, Biden 1%, Kucinich 1%, Richardson 1%, Dodd 0%, undecided 16%

=== Colorado ===
Colorado winner: Obama
Primary date: February 5, 2008
Delegates at stake 55
Delegates won to be determined
See also Colorado Democratic Presidential Preference

Poll source	Date	Highlights
Mason-Dixon Margin of error: ± 3.5%	January 21–23, 2008	Obama 34%, Clinton 32%, Edwards 17%, undecided 14%
American Research Group	September 15–18, 2007	Clinton 36%, Obama 20%, Edwards 19%, Richardson 5%, Biden 3%, Dodd 1%, Kucinich 1%, Gravel -, undecided 15%
Ciruli Associates Poll	September 12–15, 2007	Clinton 29%, Obama 23%, Edwards 23%
American Research Group	July 15–18, 2007	Clinton 39%, Obama 22%, Edwards 10%, Richardson 8%, Biden 4%, Clark 1%, Kucinich 1%, Dodd 1%, Gravel -, undecided 14%
American Research Group	April 3, 2007	Clinton 34%, Obama 23%, Edwards 17%, Biden 6%, Kucinich 3%, Richardson 2%, Clark 2%, Dodd 0%, Gravel 0%, undecided 13%

=== Connecticut ===
Connecticut winner: Obama
Primary date: February 5, 2008
Delegates at stake 48
Delegates Won Barack Obama-26 Hillary Clinton-22
See also

Poll source	Date	Highlights
Survey USA Sampling size: 635; Margin of error: ±4%	February 2, 2008 – February 3, 2008	Obama 48%, Clinton 46%, other 3%, undecided 3%
American Research Group Sampling size: 600; Margin of error: ±4%	January 30, 2008 – January 31, 2008	Clinton 48%, Obama 35%, other 8%, undecided 10%
Survey USA Sampling size: 679; Margin of error: ±3.8%	January 30, 2008 – January 31, 2008	Obama 48%, Clinton 44%, other 4%, undecided 5%
Rasmussen Reports Sampling size: 899; Margin of error: ±3%	January 27, 2008	Clinton 40%,Obama 40%, Edwards 11%, other 3%, undecided 6%
CSRA Sampling size: 403; Margin of error: ±5%	January 9–17, 2008	Clinton 41%, Obama 27%, Edwards 9%
Quinnipiac University Sampling size: 385; Margin of error: ± 5%	November 1–5, 2007	Clinton 45%, Obama 18%, Edwards 7%, Dodd 5%, Biden 4%, Richardson 2%, Kucinich 2%, Gravel -, Other 1%, undecided 14%
Quinnipiac University	October 9–15, 2007	Clinton 42%, Obama 16%, Edwards 8%, Dodd 7%, Biden 3%, Richardson 2%, Kucinich 1%, Gravel -, other 2%, undecided 17%
Quinnipiac University	May 2–7, 2007	Clinton 28%, Obama 20%, Gore 13%, Edwards 8%, Dodd 6%, Biden 2%, Kucinich 1%, Richardson 1%, Clark -, Gravel -, other 2%, undecided 17%
Quinnipiac University	9–12 February 2007	Clinton 33%, Obama 21%, Gore 9%, Dodd 8%, Edwards 5%, Biden 2%, Kucinich 1%, Richardson 1%, Clark 1%, Vilsack 0%, undecided 16%
American Research Group	2–6 February 2007	Clinton 40%, Dodd 14%, Obama 10%, Edwards 8%, Biden 3%, Kucinich 3%, Richardson 2%, Clark 1%, Vilsack 1%, undecided 19%

=== Delaware ===
Delaware winner: Barack Obama
Primary date: February 5, 2008
Delegates at stake 15
Delegates Won Barack Obama-9 Hillary Clinton-6

Poll source	Date	Highlights
American Research Group Sampling size: 600; Margin of error: ±4.0%	January 31 – February 1, 2008	Clinton 44%, Obama 42%, other 4%, undecided 10%
Fairleigh Dickinson University	October 3–9, 2007	Clinton 41%, Biden 19%, Obama 17%, Edwards 7%, other 4%, don't know 12%
Fairleigh Dickinson University	March 1, 2007	Clinton 34%, Biden 21%, Obama 19%, Edwards 10%, other 5%, don't know 10%

=== Georgia ===
(Georgia (U.S. state)) Georgia winner: Barack Obama
Primary date: February 5, 2008
Delegates at stake 87
Delegates won to be determined
See also Strategic Vision PoliticalGeorgia Democratic Presidential Preference

Poll source	Date	Highlights
Rasmussen Reports Sampling size: 542; Margin of error: ±4%	February 2, 2008	Obama 52%, Clinton 37%, other/undecided 11%
Insider Advantage Sampling size: 342; Margin of error: ±5.5%	February 2, 2008	Obama 51.3%, Clinton 35.6%, other 4.7%, undecided 8.4%
Reuters/C-SPAN/Zogby Poll Sampling size: 864; Margin of error: ±3.4%	February 1–3, 2008	Obama 48%, Clinton 31%, Gravel 2%, other 10%, undecided 11%
Mason-Dixon Sampling size: 400; Margin of error: ±5%	January 30 – February 1, 2008	Obama 47%, Clinton 41%, undecided 10%
Reuters/C-SPAN/Zogby Sampling size: 940; Margin of error: ±3.3%	January 31 – February 2, 2008	Obama 48%, Clinton 28%, Gravel 1%, undecided 23%
Insider Advantage Sampling size: 301; Margin of error: ±6%	January 30, 2008	Obama 52%, Clinton 36%, other 4%, undecided 8%
Rasmussen Reports Sampling size: 571; Margin of error: ±4%	January 22, 2008	Obama 41%, Clinton 35%, Edwards 13%, undecided 11%
Mason Dixon/AJC Sampling size: 400; Margin of error: ±5%	January 7–10, 2008	Obama 36%, Clinton 33%, Edwards 14%
Insider Advantage Sampling size: 885; Margin of error: ± 4%	December 17–18, 2007	Obama 33%, Clinton 31%, Edwards 16%, Biden 4%, Richardson 2%, Dodd 0%, Kucinich 0%, Gravel 0%, undecided 14%
Strategic Vision (R)	December 7–9, 2007	Clinton 34%, Obama 27%, Edwards 12%, Richardson 5%, Biden 2%, Kucinich 1%, Dodd 1%, undecided 18%
Strategic Vision (R)	October 19–21, 2007	Clinton 40%, Obama 27%, Edwards 11%, Richardson 5%, Biden 3%, Kucinich 1%, Dodd 1%, undecided 12%
Strategic Vision (R)	September 7–9, 2007	Clinton 34%, Obama 25%, Edwards 13%, Richardson 8%, Biden 5%, Kucinich 1%, Dodd 1%, undecided 13%
American Research Group	2–6 August 2007	Clinton 35%, Obama 25%, Edwards 17%, Biden 3%, Kucinich 3%, Richardson 3%, Dodd 1%, Clark -, Gravel -, undecided 13%
Strategic Vision (R)	June 22–24, 2007	Clinton 29%, Obama 26%, Edwards 18%, Richardson 7%, Biden 4%, Dodd 1%, Kucinich 1%, undecided 14%
Strategic Vision (R)	11 April 2007	Clinton 25%, Obama 22%, Edwards 20%, Richardson 4%, Clark 3%, Biden 3%, Dodd 1%, Kucinich 1%, undecided 21%
Insider Advantage	March 27, 2007	Clinton 32%, Edwards 27%, Obama 18%, Richardson 2%, Dodd 1%, Biden 1%
Strategic Vision	28 February 2007	Clinton 28%, Obama 25%, Edwards 18%, Clark 5%, Biden 3%, Richardson 2%, Dodd 1%, Kucinich 1%, undecided 17%
Strategic Vision	17 January 2007	Clinton 27%, Obama 20%, Edwards 15%, Gore 11%, Clark 4%, Kerry 3%, Biden 6%, Richardson 1%, Ed Rendell 1%, Vilsack 1%, Dodd 1%, Kucinich 1%, undecided 13%

=== Idaho ===
Idaho winner: Barack Obama
Primary date: February 5, 2008
Delegates at stake 18
Delegates Won Barack Obama-15 Hillary Clinton-3

Poll source	Date	Highlights
Greg Smith & Associates	July 11–13, 2007	Obama 33%, Clinton 31%, Edwards 15%

=== Illinois ===
Illinois winner: Barack Obama
Primary date: February 5, 2008
Delegates at stake 153
Delegates won to be determined
See also

Poll source	Date	Highlights
American Research Group Sampling size: 600; Margin of error: ±4%	January 30–31, 2008	Obama 51%, Clinton 40%, other 1%, undecided 8%
Chicago Tribune/WGN-TV Sampling size: 500; Margin of error: ±4,4%	January 29–31, 2008	Obama 55%, Clinton 24%, undecided 20%
Rasmussen Reports Sampling size: 631; Margin of error: ±4%	January 29, 2008	Obama 60%, Clinton 24%, Edwards 11%, Some Other Candidate 3%, Not Sure 2%
Research 2000 Sampling size: 500; Margin of error: ±4.5%	January 21–24, 2008	Obama 51%, Clinton 22%, Edwards 15%, Kucinich 2%, undecided 10%
Chicago Tribune/WGN-TV Sampling size: 500; Margin of error: ±4.4%	December 9–13, 2007	Obama 50%, Clinton 25%, Edwards 7%, Richardson 2%, Biden 2%, Kucinich 2%, Dodd <1%, undecided 11%
American Research Group	July 6–9, 2007	Obama 37%, Clinton 33%, Edwards 10%, Richardson 4%, Biden 1%, Clark 1%, Dodd 1%, Kucinich 1%, Gravel -, undecided 12%
American Research Group	4–7 January 2007	Obama 36%, Clinton 30%, Edwards 5%, Biden 3%, Richardson 3%, Dodd 2%, Kerry 2%, Clark 1%, Kucinich 1%, undecided 16%

=== Kansas ===
Kansas winner: Barack Obama
Caucus date: (21 of 40 Delegates) February 5, 2008
Delegates at stake 21 of 40
Delegates won to be determined

Poll source	Date	Highlights
Research 2000	May 21–23, 2007	Clinton 27%, Obama 22%, Edwards 21%, Richardson 8%, Kucinich 2%, Biden 1%, Dodd 1%, Gravel 1%, undecided 17%

=== Massachusetts ===
Massachusetts winner: Hillary Clinton
Primary date: February 5, 2008
Delegates at stake 93
Delegates won to be determined
See also Massachusetts Democratic Presidential Preference

Poll source	Date	Highlights
Survey USA Sampling size: 651; Margin of error: ±3.9%	February 2–3, 2008	Clinton 56%, Obama 39%, other 3%, undecided 2%
Suffolk University Sampling size: 400; Margin of error: ±4.9%	February 1–3, 2008	Obama 46%, Clinton 44%, other/undecided 10%
Survey USA Sampling size: 575; Margin of error: ±4.1%	January 31, 2008	Clinton 57%, Obama 33%, other 7%, undecided 3%
Rasmussen Reports Sampling size: 1023; Margin of error: ±3%	January 28, 2008	Clinton 43%, Obama 37%, Edwards 11%, other 4%, undecided 5%
Western New England College Sampling size: 424; Margin of error: ±5%	January 20–26, 2008	Clinton 43%, Obama 15%, Edwards 8%, undecided 31%
Survey USA	January 22–23, 2008	Clinton 59%, Obama 22%, Edwards 11%, other/undecided 8%
Survey USA Sampling size: 539; Margin of error: ±4.3%	January 16, 2008	Clinton 56%, Obama 23%, Edwards 14%, other/undecided 7%
State House News Sampling size: 244; Margin of error: ±6.2%	January 9–12, 2008	Clinton 37%, Obama 25%, Edwards 14%, undecided 11%
Suffolk University	April 12–15, 2007	Clinton 32%, Edwards 19%, Obama 18%, Gore 13%, undecided 12%
American Research Group	2–6 February 2007	Clinton 35%, Obama 24%, Edwards 19%, Clark 2%, Kucinich 2%, Biden 1%, Dodd 1%, Richardson 1%, undecided 15%

=== Minnesota ===
Minnesota winner: Barack Obama
Primary date: February 5, 2008
Delegates at stake 72
Delegates won to be determined

Poll source	Date	Highlights
Minnesota Public Radio and Humphrey Institute Poll Sampling size: 478; Margin of error: ± 4.5%	January 18, 2008 – January 27, 2008	Clinton 40%, Obama 33%, Edwards 12%, other 2%, don't know/refused 13%
Star Tribune Minnesota Poll Sampling size: 802; Margin of error: ± 8%	September 18, 2007 – September 23, 2007	Clinton 47%, Obama 22%, Edwards 16%, Kucinich 2%, Richardson 2%, Biden 1%, Gravel <1%, Dodd 0%, other <1%, none/no preference 4%, don't know/refused 7%

=== Missouri ===
Missouri winner: Barack Obama
Primary date: February 5, 2008
Delegates at stake 72
Delegates won to be determined
See also

Poll source	Date	Highlights
Survey USA Sampling size: 671; Margin of error: ±3.9%	February 2–3, 2008	Clinton 54%, Obama 43%, other 3%, undecided 1%
Reuters/C-SPAN/Zogby Sampling size: 851; Margin of error: ±3.4%	February 1–3, 2008	Obama 47%, Clinton 42%, Gravel 1%, undecided 13%
Reuters/C-SPAN/Zogby Sampling size: 877; Margin of error: ±3.4%	January 31 – February 2, 2008	Clinton 45%, Obama 44%, Gravel 1%, undecided 13%
American Research Group Sampling size: 600; Margin of error: ±4.0%	January 31 – February 1, 2008	Obama 44%, Clinton 42%, other 5%, undecided 9%
Mason-Dixon Sampling size: 400; Margin of error: ±5%	January 30 – February 1, 2008	Clinton 47%, Obama 41%, undecided 10%
Rasmussen Reports Sampling size: 507; Margin of error: ±4.5%	January 31, 2008	Clinton 47%, Obama 38%, other 11%, undecided 4%
Survey USA Sampling size: 664; Margin of error: ±3.9%	January 30–31, 2008	Clinton 48%, Obama 44%, other 5%, undecided 2%
Rasmussen Reports Sampling size: 798; Margin of error: ±4%	January 24, 2008	Clinton 43%, Obama 24%, Edwards 18%, undecided 15%
Research 2000 Sampling size: 500; Margin of error: ±4.5%	January 21–24, 2008	Clinton 44%, Obama 31%, Edwards 18%, Kucinich 1%, undecided 6%
Research 2000 Sampling size: 500	November 16, 2007	Clinton 36%, Obama 21%, Edwards 20%, Biden 4%, Richardson 3%, Dodd 2%, Kucinich 1%, Gravel -, undecided 13%
American Research Group	August 2–6, 2007	Clinton 40%, Edwards 22%, Obama 15%, Biden 5%, Richardson 4%, Dodd 1%, Kucinich 1%, Clark -, Gravel -, undecided 12%
American Research Group	4–7 January 2007	Clinton 30%, Obama 18%, Edwards 17%, Vilsack 5%, Kerry 2%, Kucinich 2%, Richardson 2%, Clark 1%, undecided 23%

=== New Jersey ===
New Jersey winner: Hillary Clinton
Primary date: February 5, 2008
Delegates at stake 107
Delegates won to be determined
See also Strategic Vision PoliticalNew Jersey Democratic Presidential Preference

Poll source	Date	Highlights
Rasmussen Reports Sampling size: 835; Margin of error: ±3%	February 4, 2008	Clinton 49%, Obama 43%
Survey USA Sampling size: 706; Margin of error: ±3.8%	February 2–3, 2008	Clinton 52%, Obama 41%, other 4%, undecided 3%
Reuters/C-SPAN/Zogby Sampling size: 847; Margin of error: ±3.4%	February 1–3, 2008	Clinton 43%, Obama 43%, Gravel 2%, undecided 14%
Reuters/C-SPAN/Zogby Sampling size: 868; Margin of error: ±3.4%	January 31 – February 2, 2008	Clinton 43%, Obama 42%, Gravel 2%, undecided 14%
Mason-Dixon Sampling size: 400; Margin of error: ±5%	January 30 – February 1, 2008	Clinton 46%, Obama 39%, undecided 12%
Monmouth University/Gannett Sampling size: 718; Margin of error: ±3.5%	January 30 – February 1, 2008	Clinton 50%, Obama 36%, other/undecided 14%
Greenberg, Quinlan, Rosner Research Inc. Sampling size: 600; Margin of error: ±4%	January 30–31, 2008	Clinton 44%, Obama 38%, Edwards 3%, Biden 1%, Richardson 1%, Kucinich 1%, other 2%, undecided 11%
Survey USA Sampling size: 642; Margin of error: ±3.9%	January 30–31, 2008	Clinton 51%, Obama 39%, other/undecided 10%
Rasmussen Reports Sampling size: 785; Margin of error: ±4%	January 30, 2008	Clinton 49%, Obama 37%, other/undecided 12%
Quinnipiac University Sampling size: 464; Margin of error: ±4.6%	January 15–22, 2008	Clinton 49%, Obama 32%, Edwards 10%, Kucinich 1%, other 1%, don't know 7%
Monmouth/Gannett Sampling size: 475; Margin of error: ±4.5%	January 9–13, 2008	Clinton 42%, Obama 30%, Edwards 9%, Kucinich 2%, other 1%, don't know 17%
Research 2000/The Record Sampling size: 400; Margin of error: ±5%	January 9–10, 2008	Clinton 48%, Obama 23%, Edwards 11%, Kucinich 2%, Richardson 2%, Gravel 1%, undecided 13%
Quinnipiac University Sampling size: 387; Margin of error: ± 5%	December 5–9, 2007	Clinton 51%, Obama 17%, Edwards 7%, Biden 3%, Kucinich 2%, Richardson 1%, Gravel 1%, Dodd -%, other 2%, undecided 12%
Quinnipiac University	October 9–15, 2007	Clinton 46%, Obama 20%, Edwards 9%, Richardson 3%, Biden 2%, Kucinich 2%, Dodd 1%, Gravel -%, other 1%, undecided 14%
Monmouth University/Gannett New Jersey Poll	September 27–30, 2007	Clinton 42%, Obama 23%, Edwards 7%, Biden 2%, Kucinich 2%, Richardson 1%, Gore 1%, Dodd 0%, Gravel 0%, don't know 21%
Strategic Vision	September 28–30, 2007	Clinton 52%, Obama 21%, Edwards 7%, Richardson 5%, Biden 2%, Dodd 1%, Kucinich 1%, undecided 11%
Quinnipiac University	18–23 September 2007	Clinton 46%, Obama 15%, Gore 11%, Edwards 7%, Biden 3%, Richardson 1%, Kucinich 1%, Dodd -%, other 1%, undecided 12%
Strategic Vision	24–26 August 2007	Clinton 49%, Obama 22%, Edwards 8%, Richardson 5%, Biden 3%, Kucinich 1%, Dodd 1%, undecided 11%
Rutgers-Eagleton	2–7 August 2007	Clinton 45%, Obama 21%, Edwards 16%, Biden 4%, Richardson 1%, Kucinich 1%, Dodd 0%, Gravel 0%, other 1%, undecided 10%
Strategic Vision	July 13–15, 2007	Clinton 46%, Obama 20%, Edwards 10%, Richardson 7%, Biden 3%, Dodd 2%, Kucinich 1%, Gravel -, undecided 11%
Quinnipiac University (with Gore)	June 26 – July 2, 2007	Clinton 37%, Gore 18%, Obama 15%, Edwards 6%, Richardson 4%, Biden 2%, Dodd 1%, Gravel -, Kucinich -, other 2%, undecided 13%
Quinnipiac University (without Gore)	June 26 – July 2, 2007	Clinton 46%, Obama 19%, Edwards 8%, Richardson 4%, Biden 3%, Dodd 1%, Gravel -, Kucinich -, other 2%, undecided 15%
Strategic Vision (R)	April 25–27, 2007	Clinton 40%, Obama 23%, Edwards 12%, Biden 5%, Dodd 2%, Richardson 2%, Kucinich 1%, undecided 15%
Monmouth University	April 11–16, 2007	Clinton 41%, Obama 22%, Edwards 13%, Biden 3%, Richardson 2%, Dodd -, Kucinich -, VOL-Al Gore 1%, don't know 18%
American Research Group	March 29 – April 2, 2007	Clinton 37%, Obama 23%, Biden 9%, Edwards 9%, Richardson 6%, Dodd 2%, Kucinich 1%, Clark 0%, Gravel 0%, undecided 14%
Quinnipiac University	20–25 February 2007	Clinton 41%, Obama 19%, Gore 10%, Edwards 5%, Biden 3%, Clark 1%, Richardson 1%, Kucinich 1%, other 2%, wouldn't vote 2%, undecided 15%
Quinnipiac University	16–22 January 2007	Clinton 30%, Obama 16%, Gore 11%, Edwards 8%, Kerry 6%, Biden 6%, Clark 2%, Richardson 1%, other 2%, wouldn't vote 1%, undecided 17%

=== New Mexico ===
New Mexico winner: Hillary Clinton
Primary date: February 5, 2008
Delegates at stake 26
Delegates won to be determined
See also New Mexico Democratic Presidential Caucus Preference

Poll source	Date	Highlights
Actual result (99% precincts reporting)	February 5, 2008	Clinton 49%, Obama 48%, Edwards 2%, Richardson 1%
New Mexico State University Sampling size: 207; Margin of error: ±7%	January 22–31, 2008	Obama 48%, Clinton 42%, undecided 10%
New Mexico State University	April 3–7, 2007	Richardson 33%, Clinton 23%, Obama 19%, Edwards 18%
American Research Group	4–7 January 2007	Richardson 28%, Clinton 22%, Obama 17%, Edwards 12%, Clark 5%, Kucinich 3%, Biden 1%, Dodd 1%, Kerry 1%, Vilsack 1%, undecided 10%

=== New York ===
(New York (state)) New York winner: Hillary Clinton
Primary date: February 5, 2008
Delegates at stake 232
Delegates won to be determined
See also PollsterNew York Democratic Presidential Preference

Poll source	Date	Highlights
Actual result (100% precincts reporting)	February 5, 2008	Clinton 57%, Obama 40%, Edwards 1%
Rasmussen Reports Sampling size: 799; Margin of error: ±4%	January 31 – February 1, 2008	Clinton 52%, Obama 34%, other 8%, undecided 6%
WNBC/Marist College Sampling size: 660; Margin of error: ±4%	January 30–31, 2008	Clinton 54%, Obama 38%, undecided 8%
Survey USA Sampling size: 950; Margin of error: ±3,2%	January 30–31, 2008	Clinton 54%, Obama 38%, other/undecided 8%
Public Policy Polling (D) Sampling size: 837; Margin of error: ± 3.4%	January 29, 2008	Clinton 45%, Obama 33%, Edwards 10%, undecided 13%
USA Today/Gallup Sampling size: 426; Margin of error: ±5%	January 23–26, 2008	Clinton 56%, Obama 28%, Edwards 11%, undecided 5%
Quinnipiac University Sampling size: 544; Margin of error: ±4.2%	January 14–21, 2008	Clinton 51%, Obama 25%, Edwards 11%, Kucinich 2%, undecided 10%
Zogby Sampling size: 425; Margin of error: ±4.9%	January 19–20, 2008	Clinton 47%, Obama 26%, Edwards 9%, Kucinich 1%, Gravel <1%, other/undecided 16%
Rasmussen Reports Sampling size: 596; Margin of error: ±4%	January 16–17, 2008	Clinton 51%, Obama 30%, Edwards 10%, undecided 9%
WNBC/Marist College Sampling size: 426; Margin of error: ±5%	January 15–17, 2008	Clinton 47%, Obama 31%, Edwards 9%, Kucinich 3%, other 1%, undecided 7%
Siena College Sampling size: 311; Margin of error: ±5.6%	January 14–17, 2008	Clinton 48%, Obama 23%, Edwards 10%, undecided 19%
Survey USA Sampling size: 957; Margin of error: ±3.2%	January 9–10, 2008	Clinton 56%, Obama 29%, Edwards 8%, other/undecided 8%
Quinnipiac University Sampling size: 461; Margin of error: ± 4.6%	December 4–10, 2007	Clinton 55%, Obama 17%, Edwards 7%, Biden 2%, Kucinich 2%, Richardson 2%, Gravel -, Dodd -, other 1%, undecided 15%
Datamar	December 2–8, 2007	Clinton 44.5%, Edwards 13.0%, Obama 10.8%, Biden 4.4%, Richardson 3.9%, Kucinich 3.2%, Gravel 0.9%, Dodd 0.3%, undecided 18.9%
Datamar	November 1–4, 2007	Clinton 45.0%, Obama 14.1%, Edwards 9.3%, Biden 5.9%, Kucinich 3.5%, Richardson 2.9%, Dodd 1.7%, Gravel 0.3%, undecided 17.4%
Quinnipiac University	October 9–15, 2007	Clinton 49%, Obama 12%, Edwards 11%, Biden 2%, Kucinich 2%, Richardson 2%, Dodd 1%, Gravel -, other 2%, undecided 16%
Quinnipiac University	September 24–30, 2007	Clinton 47%, Obama 15%, Gore 9%, Edwards 7%, Biden 3%, Kucinich 2%, Richardson 1%, Dodd -, Gravel -, other 2%, undecided 12%
Siena College	July 24–28, 2007	Clinton 48%, Obama 14%, Gore 10%, Edwards 7%, Biden 3%, Kucinich 2%, Richardson 2%, Dodd 1%, undecided 13%
Siena College	June 18–21, 2007	Clinton 43%, Gore 19%, Obama 11%, Edwards 9%, other 18%
Quinnipiac University	June 12–17, 2007	Clinton 43%, Gore 19%, Obama 14%, Edwards 6%, Richardson 3%, Biden 1%, Kucinich 1%, Dodd -, Gravel -, other 2%, undecided 10%
Siena College	May 18–25, 2007	Clinton 42%, Gore 13%, Obama 13%, Edwards 7%, Kucinich 4%, Biden 3%, Richardson 3%, Dodd -, undecided 15%
Siena College	April 16–20, 2007	Clinton 39%, Obama 17%, Gore 12%, Edwards 11%, Richardson 4%, Biden 2%, Kucinich 1%, Dodd 0%, undecided 13%
NY1	April 4–7, 2007	Clinton 49%, Obama 17%, Edwards 11%, Biden 3%, Richardson 2%, Dodd 1%, Other 1%, undecided 14%
American Research Group	March 29 – April 2, 2007	Clinton 41%, Obama 20%, Edwards 16%, Biden 6%, Dodd 3%, Richardson 3%, Clark 0%, Gravel 0%, Kucinich 0%, undecided 12%
Quinnipiac University	29 March–April 1, 2007	Clinton 44%, Gore 14%, Obama 14%, Edwards 9%, Biden 1%, Kucinich 1%, Richardson 1%, Dodd 0%, Clark 0%, Gravel 0%, other 1%, undecided 13%
Siena College	26 March 2007	Clinton 43%, Gore 14%, Obama 11%, Edwards 7%, Richardson 4%, Kucinich 3%, Biden 1%, Dodd 0%, Unsure 17%
WNBC/Marist	20–22 March 2007	Clinton 44%, Gore 16%, Obama 14%, Edwards 9%, Biden 3%, Richardson 2%, Sharpton 1%, Dodd 1%, Clark <1%, Gravel <1%, Kucinich <1%, Dodd 0%, undecided 10%
Quinnipiac University	14 February 2007	Clinton 47%, Obama 16%, Gore 11%, Edwards 7%, Kucinich 1%, Dodd 1%, Clark 1%, Richardson 1%, Biden 1%

=== Oklahoma ===
Oklahoma winner: Hillary Clinton
Primary date: February 5, 2008
Delegates at stake 38
Delegates won to be determined
See also Oklahoma Democratic Presidential Preference

Poll source	Date	Highlights
KFOR/Survey USA Sampling size: 673; Margin of error: ±3.8%	February 2–3, 2008	Clinton 54%, Obama 27%, other 15%, undecided 3%
Tulsa-World/KOTV/Sooner Poll Sampling size: 426; Margin of error: 4.75%	January 27–30, 2008	Clinton 41%, Edwards 24%, Obama 17%, other 2%, don't know/refused 16%
KFOR/Survey USA Sampling size: 714; Margin of error: ±3.7%	January 27, 2008	Clinton 44%, Edwards 27%, Obama 19%, other 6%, undecided 3%
KFOR/Survey USA Sampling size: 650; Margin of error: 3.9%	January 11–13, 2008	Clinton 45%, Edwards 25%, Obama 19%, other 7%, undecided 4%
KWTV/TVPoll.com Sampling size: Margin of error: 2.24%	January 7, 2008	Clinton 33.7%, Edwards 28.5%, Obama 16.4%, other 5.4%, undecided 15.9%
Tulsa-World/KOTV/Sooner Poll Sampling size: 380; Margin of error: 5.03%	December 16–19, 2007	Clinton 34%, Edwards 25%, Obama 15%, Richardson 4%, Dodd 1%, Kucinich 1%, don't know/refused 20%
Tulsa-World/KOTV/Sooner Poll	April 27–30, 2007	John Edwards 29%, Clinton 29%, Obama 13%, Richardson 8%, Biden 3%, Dodd 1%, don't know/refused 17%
American Research Group	8–13 February 2007	Clinton 40%, Edwards 16%, Obama 15%, Biden 3%, Clark 2%, Richardson 2%, Vilsack 2%, Dodd 1%, Gravel 1%, Kucinich 1%, undecided 18%
Tulsa-World/KOTV/Sooner Poll	3 February 2007	Clinton 28%, Edwards 23%, Obama 14%

=== Tennessee ===
Tennessee winner: Hillary Clinton
Primary date: February 5, 2008
Delegates at stake 68
Delegates won to be determined

Poll source	Date	Highlights
Insider Advantage Sampling size: 485	February 2, 2008	Clinton 55.4%, Obama 34.6%, other 3.5%, undecided 6.5%
Rasmussen Reports Sampling size: 448	January 30, 2008	Clinton 49%, Obama 35%, other 16%, undecided 4%
Insider Advantage Sampling size: 463; Margin of error: ±4.5%	January 30, 2008	Clinton 59%, Obama 26%, other 7%, undecided 8%
WSMV/Crawford Johnson & Northcott Sampling size: 402; Margin of error: ±5%	January 28–29, 2008	Clinton 36%, Obama 31%, Edwards 7%, other 1%, undecided 25%
WSMV/Crawford, Johnson & Northcott Sampling size: 503; Margin of error: ±5%	January 19–21, 2008	Clinton 34%, Obama 20%, Edwards 16%, other 2%, undecided 28%
Insider Advantage (without Gore)	31 March–April 1, 2007	Clinton 35%, Edwards 20%, Obama 20%, undisclosed remaining percent 25%
Insider Advantage (with Gore)	31 March–April 1, 2007	Clinton 28%, Gore 25%, undisclosed remaining percent 47%

=== Utah ===
Utah winner: Obama
Primary date: February 5, 2008
Delegates at stake 23
Delegates won to be determined
See also Utah Democratic Presidential Preference

Poll source	Date	Highlights
Deseret Morning News/KSL-TV Margin of error: ±6.5%	January 30 – February 1, 2008	Obama 53%, Clinton 29%, other/undecided 18%
American Research Group	8–13 February 2007	Clinton 31%, Obama 18%, Vilsack 16%, Edwards 9%, Dodd 3%, Biden 2%, Clark 1%, Kucinich 1%, Richardson 1%, undecided 20%
