= 2008 Wisconsin Democratic presidential primary =

- February 19, 2008

92 Democratic National Convention delegates (74 pledged, 18 unpledged)

Candidate	Barack Obama	Hillary Clinton
Home state	Illinois	New York
Delegate count	42	32
Popular vote	646,851	453,954
Percentage	58.08%	40.76%
- County results Obama: 40–50% 50–60% 60–70% Clinton: 40–50% 50–60%

The 2008 Wisconsin Democratic presidential primary took place on February 19, 2008. 74 pledged delegates were at stake. The 2008 Hawaii Democratic presidential caucuses took place the same day.

The Wisconsin primary came after Senator Barack Obama had won the majority of delegates and votes in 8 straight primaries and caucuses; his wins in Wisconsin, and Hawaii extended his winning streak to 10 and reinforced his front-runner status.

In the days leading up to the primary the Hillary Clinton campaign ran television ads criticizing Obama on healthcare and for not agreeing to more candidate debates. This caused the Obama campaign to launch a response ad that mentioned the 18 debates already held and 2 more scheduled. The Clinton campaign also charged Obama using lines in a speech similar to words spoken by Massachusetts Governor and Obama friend Deval Patrick; Patrick responded by saying he and Obama often swap ideas, and that he had willingly shared lines without asking for credit to be given. Barack Obama was the winner.

== Polls ==
Polls taken throughout 2007 consistently put Hillary Clinton in the lead, but during February 2008 most polls showed Barack Obama with the advantage. A Rasmussen poll taken February 13 reported that almost one-fourth of those polled said there was a good chance they might change their mind. It also found that while Clinton was doing well among women, with a 10-point advantage over Obama, Obama was polling 23 points higher than her among men.

== Results ==
Key:	Withdrew prior to contest

2008 Wisconsin Democratic presidential primary
Candidate	Votes	Percentage	National delegates
Barack Obama	646,851	58.08%	42
Hillary Clinton	453,954	40.76%	32
John Edwards	6,693	0.60%	0
Dennis Kucinich	2,625	0.24%	0
Joe Biden	755	0.07%	0
Bill Richardson	528	0.05%	0
Mike Gravel	517	0.05%	0
Christopher Dodd	501	0.04%	0
Uninstructed	861	0.08%	0
Totals	1,113,285	100%	74

== Analysis ==
In the weeks and days leading up to the Wisconsin Democratic Primary, most pundits agreed that it was Hillary Clinton's chance to halt Obama's momentum after winning contests in Washington, Louisiana, Nebraska, Virginia, Maryland, Washington, D.C. following Super Tuesday.

Hillary Clinton enjoyed healthy leads among white voters in previous states and hoped that winning Wisconsin or at least the white vote would allow for a victory of sorts. However, CNN Exit Polls showed that Obama won the white vote (which comprised 87% of the electorate on primary day) 54%-45%. Also, other key Clinton constituencies showed Obama making significant strides such as the female vote which split 50%-50%, the 54-65 Age Group which voted for Obama 54%-45%.

After the victory in Wisconsin as well as Caucuses in Washington and a primary in Hawaii held on the same day gave Obama the momentum of winning 10 straight contests. The Pledged delegate standing after the Wisconsin Primary was Obama leading 1154-1011.

2008 Wisconsin Democratic presidential primary
Demographic subgroup	Obama	Clinton	% of total vote
Total vote	58	41	100
Sex
Male	61	35	43
Female	51	49	57
Age
18–64 years old	61	37	72
65 and older	39	60	28
Marital status
Married	53	45	63
Single	58	39	37
Family income
Less than $50,000	51	49	41
$50,000 or more	59	39	59
Religion
Protestant/Other Christian	57	43	32
Catholic	49	51	40
None	53	38	11
Education
High school graduate	44	52	25
Some college or associate degree	57	43	31
College graduate	59	41	22
Postgraduate study	64	32	20
Party affiliation
Democrat	50	49	64
Independent / Other	63	34	27
Political philosophy
Liberal	56	40	47
Moderate	54	46	40
Conservative	52	48	13
Which issue is the most important facing the country?
The economy	55	43	43
The war in Iraq	57	40	29
Health care	51	48	25
Candidate quality that matters most
Can bring about needed change	77	20	52
Cares about people like me	53	46	16
Has the right experience	5	95	24

== See also ==
- 2008 Democratic Party presidential primaries
- 2008 Wisconsin Republican presidential primary
